= James Gray (goldsmith) =

Scottish goldsmith

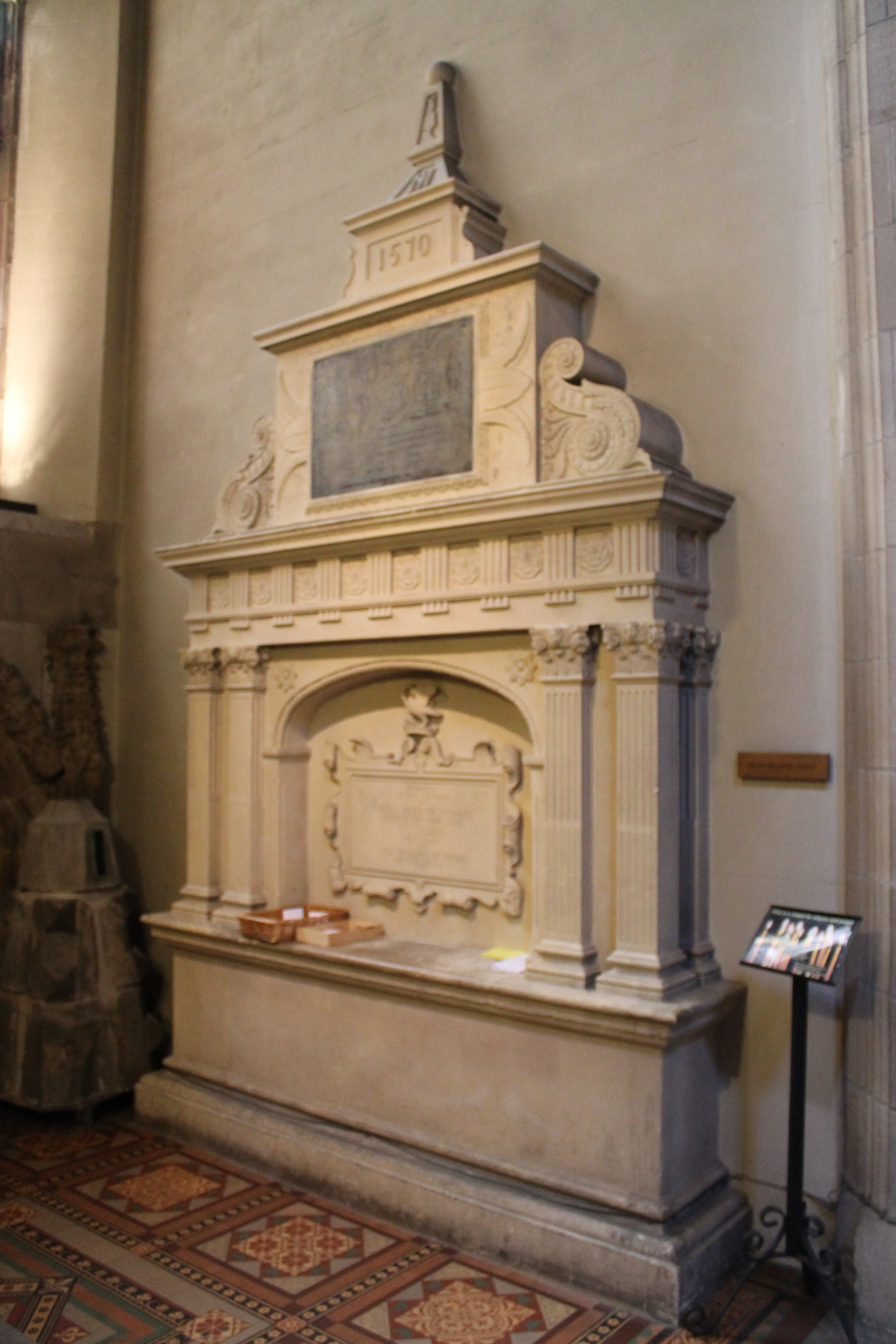
The reconstructed tomb of Regent Moray in St Giles' Cathedral

James Gray was a Scottish goldsmith working in Edinburgh during the reigns of Mary, Queen of Scots and James VI of Scotland. Gray is known for the "Galloway mazer", a gilt cup now held by the National Museums of Scotland. He also engraved the brass plate for the tomb of Regent Moray (died 1570) in St Giles, Edinburgh.

== Royal mint ==
Gray sold pearls to Mary, Queen of Scots and refashioned and mended a basin and laver for her. He also worked for the royal mint as a "sinker" or engraver of dies. His colleagues at the mint included James Mosman an assay master, David Forrest or Forret, General of the coin house, Andrew Henderson, warden, and John Balfour, comptroller warden.

Gray was appointed in March 1575, with other mint workers, to inspect base money coins, known as hardheads and placks, in order to weed out counterfeits, and good coins for recirculation were marked the heraldic heart and star motif of Regent Morton. Gray was in charge of the countermarking process. In January 1584, Gray gave up his position of "sinker of the irons" at the mint to Thomas Foulis.

== A Canongate goldsmith ==
He was a burgess of the Canongate. James Gray and the carpenter Andrew Mansioun were among the elders of the kirk of the Canongate in August 1567, and members of the Canongate burgh council in 1569.

Gray is noted as the maker of the "Galloway mazer". A mazer is a kind of cup with a wooden bowl and silver mounts. The Galloway mazer has a maple wood bowl and engraved silver-gilt mounts. It has the hallmarks of a stag for the Canongate and "IG" as the initials of the maker James Gray.

It was made for a wealthy couple, Archibald Stewart and Helen or Ellen Acheson. Stewart was a wealthy merchant and a younger brother of James Stewart of Doune. Acheson was a daughter of the goldsmith, coiner, and mining entrepreneur John Acheson, and widow of another wealthy merchant, William Birnie. In September 1569 Regent Moray granted them the custom duties of the "Newhaven of Preston" also known as Acheson's Haven.

The mazer has their initials "AS EA", and the inscription from Proverbs 22, "Ane good name is to be chosen above great riches, and loving favour is above silver and above most fyne golde, 1569". James Gray was likely a relative of the Achesons. An Isobel Gray (died 1565) was the wife of Alexander Acheson in Preston.

The mazer descended in the Stewart of Burray family to the Earls of Galloway. In 1954 the politician Jo Grimond spoke in the House of Commons that the mazer ought to be retained in Scotland, and it was purchased for the National Museums of Scotland with assistance from the Art Fund.

The earlier "Tulloch mazer" also has the "IG" and Canongate marks. The "print", the disc inside the bowl has the Tulloch arms, a Latin motto "HONORA DEUM ET TOTA ANIMA TUA", and the date 1557. It was once enamelled.

The brass used for Regent Moray's tomb was second-hand. Gray was paid £20 for engraving the inscription, which was composed by George Buchanan. The monument was built by the mason Murdoch Walker.

James Gray has been suggested as a possible maker of the Lennox jewel in the Royal Collection, along with the elder George Heriot and Michael Gilbert. The Lennox jewel is displayed at Holyrood Palace.
