= Archibald Stewart (merchant) =

Scottish merchant and Provost of Edinburgh

- Born: c. 1530; Scotland
- Died: c. 1584 (aged 53–54)
- Occupation: Merchant
- Known for: Gold cup made for him and his wife, now known as the "Galloway mazer"
- Spouse: Helen (or Ellen) Acheson (m. 1569)
- Children: None
- Relatives: James Stewart, 1st Lord Doune (brother), John Acheson (father in-law)

Archibald Stewart (c. 1530–1584) was a Scottish merchant and Provost of Edinburgh.

== Early life ==
He was a younger brother of James Stewart, 1st Lord Doune. In 1569 he married Helen or Ellen Acheson, a daughter of the goldsmith and mint official John Acheson. She was the widow of another Edinburgh merchant, William Birnie, and had a daughter Margaret Fraser from a previous marriage.

His step-daughter Margaret Fraser was married to Thomas Acheson, a master coiner in the Edinburgh mint. Birnie had been the richest merchant in Edinburgh.

== Career ==
In May 1569 Regent Moray granted them the goods of the elder William Birnie and his daughter Margaret. In September 1569 he granted the couple the customs of the "New Haven of Preston" known as Acheson's Haven.

The Canongate goldsmith James Gray made a cup for the couple, now known as the "Galloway mazer". It has their initials "AS EA". and the inscription, "Ane good mane is to be chosen above great riches, and loving favour is above silver and above most fyne golde, 1569".

During the Marian Civil War, Stewart and Helen Acheson lent money to William Kirkcaldy of Grange who held Edinburgh Castle for Mary, Queen of Scots, taking some of the jewels of Mary, Queen of Scots as security. The goldsmith James Mosman arranged the loans. Acheson and her servant came to the lodging of the English commander William Drury in Leith and received his obligation or IOU for the jewels.

== Provost of Edinburgh ==
Stewart was Provost of Edinburgh from 14 April 1578 to 6 October 1579. He replaced George Douglas of Parkhead. James Douglas, 4th Earl of Morton, had resigned the Regency and his followers were displaced from public offices.

As Provost, Stewart renewed a ban on Robin Hood plays. In May 1579 he conveyed the King's orders that the townspeople should send an armed force to Hamilton and Clydesdale against Lord John Hamilton and Claud Hamilton, and to demolish their houses. The Deacons of the crafts undertook to send 150 men to serve as soldiers at the siege of Hamilton, and tax money was raised to fund them.

James VI had been living at Stirling Castle, and towards the end of 1579 he was proclaimed an adult ruler and made a formal Entry to Edinburgh. As a gift to him, the town council commissioned a cupboard of silver plate from the goldsmiths Edward Hart, Thomas Annand, George Heriot, Adam Craig, and William Cokky. Alexander Clark of Balbirnie was Provost when the king's entry took place in October.

Archibald Stewart hosted a banquet in his house (the "Great Lodging" in the Canongate) for a departing French ambassador, Bertrand de Salignac de la Mothe-Fénelon, on 10 February 1583. Stewart owned the old lodging of Cardinal David Beaton in the Cowgate, which was used by the royal mint from 1581.

== Later life ==
Archibald Stewart died at Restalrig on 2 September 1584, a year before his wife. The money borrowed by William Kirkcaldy of Grange had not been repaid.

Helen Acheson died on 26 March 1586. They had a farm at Restalrig. She owned fishing rights at Inverspey. She also had an interest in a property, the "great lodging" in the Cowgate, and paid an "annualrent" from it to the lawyer John Shairp and his wife, Eufame Acheson. The lodging was the venue for a banquet for Danish ambassadors in 1590 at the coronation of Anna of Denmark. Her will includes the debt from 1573 for money loaned to William Kirkcaldy and also money owed to her by the English commander at the "lang siege", William Drury, who had collected the queen's jewels from Kirkcaldy's creditors.

They had no children. The mazer descended in the Stewart of Burray family to the Earls of Galloway. In 1954 the politician Jo Grimond spoke in the House of Commons that the mazer ought to be retained in Scotland, and it was purchased for the National Museums of Scotland with assistance from the Art Fund.
