= Mints of Scotland =

Penny of Henry of Scotland
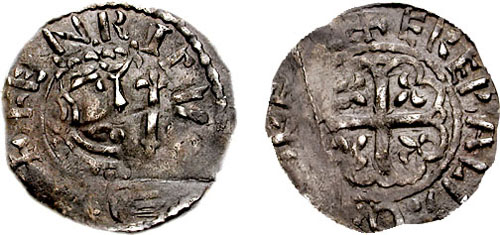
First side of the image: hENRICVS •[F RE?], crowned bust right, sceptre before
Second side of the image: +EREBALD: ON [C]OREB:, cross moline with fleur in each angle within tressure
AR 1,18 gm, 10h. Corbridge mint; moneyer: (H)erebald

The Scottish Mint was the Kingdom of Scotland's official maker of Scottish coinage. There were a number of mints in Scotland, for the production of the Scottish coinage with the most important mint being in the capital, Edinburgh, which was active from the reign of David I (1124–1153), and was the last to close, in the 19th century.

== History ==
=== Origins ===
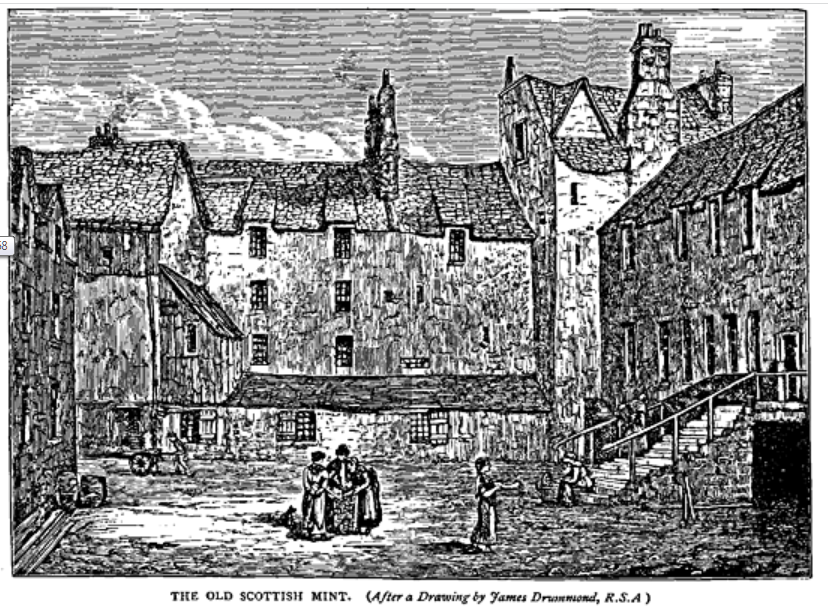
The Old Scottish Mint on the Cowgate

Carlisle was probably the first Scottish mint in 1136. According to Bateson, David I began to mint coins after capturing the city. Mints at Bamburgh and Corbridge in Northumberland, under the control of David's son Henry, Earl of Northumberland, later returned to English control. Under Alexander III (1249–1286) there were 16 mints. In the reign of James IV (1488–1513), the sole mint was located at Edinburgh. After this time, the only other active mint was at Stirling, where bawbees were minted under Queen Mary in 1544.

=== At Holyrood ===
Until 1559 a mint was in the grounds of the Palace of Holyroodhouse in Edinburgh. The buildings included a house for the Master Coiner, and another dwelling occupied by the goldsmith Adam Leys. David Forrest was Master or General of the mint in 1555. He employed an English technician or metallurgist called Meservy as master coiner. His work proved fraudulent and he was imprisoned in the Tolbooth.

=== Edinburgh castle ===
From 1559 the mint was located within the confines of Edinburgh Castle for security reasons after Protestants secured the coining irons during the Scottish Reformation. In 1562, building work at the new mint in the castle and at the Holyrood site was supervised by William MacDowall. In 1571, the principal officers of the mint were; David Forrest, General; Andrew Henderson, Warden; David Adamson, Counter-Warden; James Mosman, Assayer, and his replacement Thomas Acheson; James Gray, Sinker of the dies or coining irons; John Acheson, Master coiner.

=== Marian Civil War ===
In March 1568, William Drury, an English officer at Berwick-upon-Tweed, reported that English silver coins were being purchased with base metal Scottish coins (such as placks and bawbees), to be recoined at a profit at the Scottish mint.

During the Marian Civil War and "lang siege" of Edinburgh Castle, James Cockie minted silver coins in the castle, and Regent Morton coined equivalent pieces at Dalkeith Castle. According to the Diurnal of Occurrents coins minted with high silver content at this time were purchased at a premium in Leith and sent abroad. The mint in the castle ceased production when they realised they were being undercut. Morton alleged the castle coins were "adulterat and corrupt" although they were intended to pass as currency. Morton also revived the mint at Holyroodhouse in May 1573, ordering repairs to be made by William MacDowall and moving equipment stored in the palace's south tower to the old mint building.

=== Regent Morton ===
Regent Morton revalued copper or base "black money" coinage, using a countermark of a heart, some at three times its face value, and used this to pay for various building projects for the Crown, including the building of the half-moon battery at Edinburgh Castle. The countermark was made by the goldsmith James Gray, and can be seen on many placks and hardheads today. In 1575, Morton devalued the currency to its base value to the anger of those still holding it.

Regent Morton attempted to revive gold mining in Scotland, and in July 1576 a proclamation was issued, forbidding the sale of gold in Scotland except to the Master Coiner, John Acheson.

In 1598, the operation of the mint was entrusted to two Edinburgh financiers, the goldsmith Thomas Foulis and the textile merchant Robert Jousie. They undertook to pay £5,000 to the crown yearly during their six year contract.

== The mint in the Cowgate ==
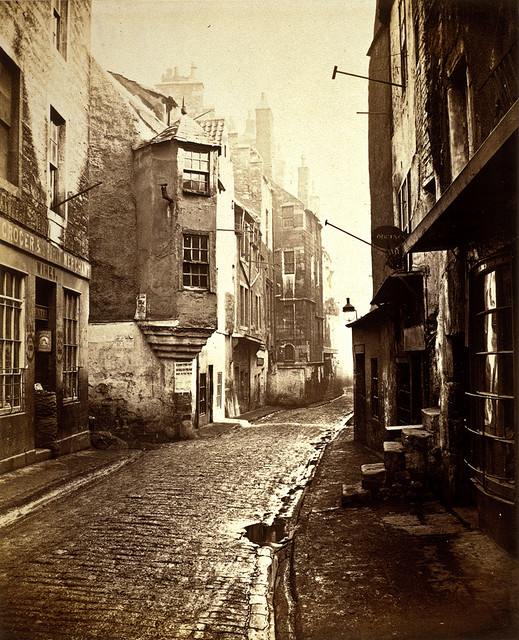
The mint in Edinburgh's Cowgate included Cardinal Beaton's lodging (demolished), with its turret.

From 1574 until 1707 the mint in Edinburgh was located on the Cowgate at the foot of South Grays Close, including Cardinal David Beaton's lodging. Some repairs to the buildings were carried out by the royal master of work William MacDowall in 1580. In 1581, an act of the Privy Council noted that the mint buildings beside Holyrood Palace were ruinous, and coins were to be minted at Archibald Stewart's house, the old Cardinal's lodging. The mint buildings and the Cardinal's lodging became the property of the mint master Thomas Acheson, who had a house in nearby Todrig's Wynd, and were demolished in 1877. The site is now commemorated by the street name "Coinyie House Close".

== Treaty of Union ==
Minting ceased in Scotland in 1709 when the Edinburgh Mint produced its last batch of coins at the end of the 1707–1710 Scottish recoinage, although it retained its permanent officials (though not other staff) for a further hundred years, until 1814. The mint was finally abolished in 1817 and sold in 1830. The title of 'Governor of the Mint of Scotland', which passed to the Chancellor of the Exchequer under the Coinage Act 1870, was finally abolished with the passing of the Coinage Act 1971.

== Mints ==
Scottish mints
	David I	earl Henry	Malcom IV	William	Alexander II	Alexander III	John; Baliol	Robert; Bruce	David II	Robert II	Robert III	James I	James II	James III	James IV	James V	Mary I
Aberdeen						x			x		x	x	x	x
Ayr						x
Bamborough		x
Berwick	x			x	x	x							x
Carlisle	x	x
Corbridge		x
Dumbarton											x
Dunbar				x		x
Dundee										x
Edinburgh	x			x		x			x	x	x	x	x	x	x	x	x
Forfar						x
Forres						x
Glasgow						x
Hamer	x
Inverness						x						x
Jedburgh			x
Kelso					x
Kinghorn						x
Lanark						x
Linlithgow												x	x
Montrose						x
Perth				x		x				x	x	x		x
Roxburgh	x		x	x	x	x
St Andrews						x	x
Stirling				x		x						x	x				x

== Bibliography ==
- Adam de Cardonnel (1786). Numismata Scotiæ Or, A Series of the Scottish Coinage, from the Reign of William the Lion to the Union. George Nicol, Edinburgh.
- Donald Bateson. Scottish Coins. Shire Publications Ltd., Bucks, 1987, ISBN 0-85263-847-7
- James Mackay – John Mussel (eds.): Coin Price Guide to British coins, Token Publishing Ltd, Axminster, Devon
- Ian Halley Stewart. The Scottish Coinage, Spink & Son, London, 1955
