= Alexander Clark of Balbirnie =

Scottish merchant and Provost of Edinburgh

Alexander Clark of Balbirnie (died 1591) was a Scottish merchant and Provost of Edinburgh. He was closely involved with English diplomacy.

Alexander Clark was Provost of Edinburgh in 1578 and from 1579 to 1584. His surname can also be written "Clerk" or "Clarke", the historian Michael Lynch uses "Clark". Balbirnie is now part of Glenrothes.

== Career ==
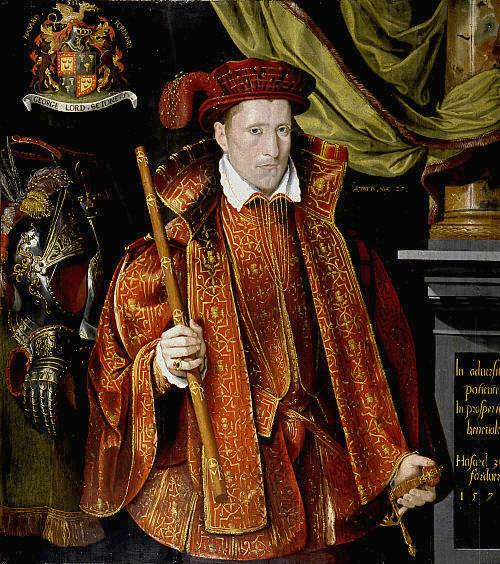
According to Clark, George Seton, 7th Lord Seton helped to plan a French invasion of England, starting at Lindisfarne

In November 1560 Clark was in Paris, an archer of the Scottish Guard, and a friend of the English ambassador Nicholas Throckmorton. He obtained permission to return to Scotland with a Scottish ambassador Lord Seton, and Throckmorton gave him a letter for William Cecil in London, recommending his services. Throckmorton advised secrecy in London and did not wish French diplomats to see Clark received at court by Elizabeth I. Throckmorton also wrote to Elizabeth, explaining that Clark could help her ally, the Protestant James Hamilton, 3rd Earl of Arran and was also in credit with the Catholic Lord Seton. He would be able to send her good intelligence on French initiatives in Scotland.

Clark wrote to Cecil on 1 January 1561 from Edinburgh. He said that Lord Seton had been invited to an audience in France with Francis, Duke of Guise and Cardinal of Lorraine and two military engineers or "devisers of forts". They had discussed a map of Lindisfarne or Holy Island near Berwick-upon-Tweed, with a clay model of the island with two forts intended to be garrisoned for France. The plan, according to Clark, was to capture the English fortress town of Berwick by next May. Clark was established in Edinburgh as a burgess and guild member in the 1560s with the help of the Earl of Moray. He became a friend of the English ambassador, Thomas Randolph.

In April 1565 he was one of the first to see Roman remains discovered at Inveresk near Musselburgh and described a hypocaust and carved stones to Thomas Randolph. Randolph sent a copy of an inscription, "APOLLONI GRANNO Q. L. SABINIANUS PROC. AUG" to Cecil. This "proud and blasphemous superscription" was first published by John Napier in 1593.

Later in April 1565, Clark sent Randolph a political newsletter. He opened with comments on Randolph's personal business, his debts and rent, and made a joke with nonsense words about Randolph's affection for Mary Beaton, a companion of Mary, Queen of Scots; "And as to your mistress Marie Beton, she is both darimpus and sclenbrunit, and you in like manner without contrebaxion or kylteperante, so you are both worth little money."

In September 1567 Clark lent Regent Moray £530 Scots on the security of a gold pendant enamelled in black with a long cabochon ruby from the jewels of Mary, Queen of Scots. He formed a partnership with another merchant, William Birnie, to sell the lead from the roof of Elgin Cathedral.

Clark loaned money to William Kirkcaldy of Grange secured on more of the queen's jewels. Grange used the money to pay the wages of the garrison of Edinburgh Castle during the "Lang Siege". After the castle surrendered, Clark delivered the jewels to Regent Morton. In that year, Clark corresponded with Regent Moray's widow, Agnes or Annas Keith about books she wished to purchase in Edinburgh. She had an account with Clark and borrowed money from his wife.

In February 1580, Clark was reimbursed £106 by the town's treasurer for a banquet he held for the king and the Privy Council. Robert Bowes heard of moves to replace Clark as Provost with Archibald Stewart in January 1581. In May 1581, Clark asked the Privy Council that if Kirkcaldy's heirs were ever restored to his lands, he should be paid.

On 8 June 1582 Clerk appeared before the Privy Council of Scotland at Stirling Castle and gave his oath with others of the burgh council that they would endeavour to recover 8,000 merks from the estate of the late Robert Reid, Bishop of Orkney and employ the money to found the University of Edinburgh. His election as Provost in October 1582 was disputed by the merchants and craftsmen in Edinburgh. The craftsmen preferred Clark. An English diplomat, Robert Bowes claimed the merchants backed another candidate who would support the English-leaning Ruthven regime.

As Provost of Edinburgh, Clark loaned money to James VI. In April 1584 the king's valet John Gibb delivered a royal jewel, a tablet or locket with a diamond and an emerald, to Clark, as a pledge for a loan of 6,000 merks. In October 1589 the next Provost John Arnot gave the jewel back to the king as a gift on his marriage. It was delivered by Clark's son-in-law John Provand to William Fairlie, who commissioned the goldsmith David Gilbert to refashion and upgrade it, and it was presented to Anne of Denmark during her Entry to Edinburgh in May 1590.

== Marriage and family ==
Clark married Marion Primrose, a daughter of the royal physician Gilbert Primrose. Their children included:

- Alexander Clerk
- James Clark or Clerk of Balbirnie
- Bathia Clark, who married John Provand of Caldhame. His first wife was Katherine Henrysoun.
- Magdalene Clark, who married Edward Bruce, 1st Lord Kinloss, and secondly, James Fullerton
