= Blyth Bridge =

Village in Scottish Borders, Scotland

Coordinates: 55.695°N 3.376°W

- Location within the Scottish Borders
- Population: 107
- OS grid reference: NT136455
- Council area: Scottish Borders
- Lieutenancy area: Peeblesshire
- Country: Scotland
- Sovereign state: United Kingdom
- Post town: WEST LINTON
- Postcode district: EH46
- Dialling code: 01721
- Police: Scotland
- Fire: Scottish
- Ambulance: Scottish
- UK Parliament: Dumfriesshire, Clydesdale and Tweeddale
- Scottish Parliament: Midlothian South, Tweeddale and Lauderdale

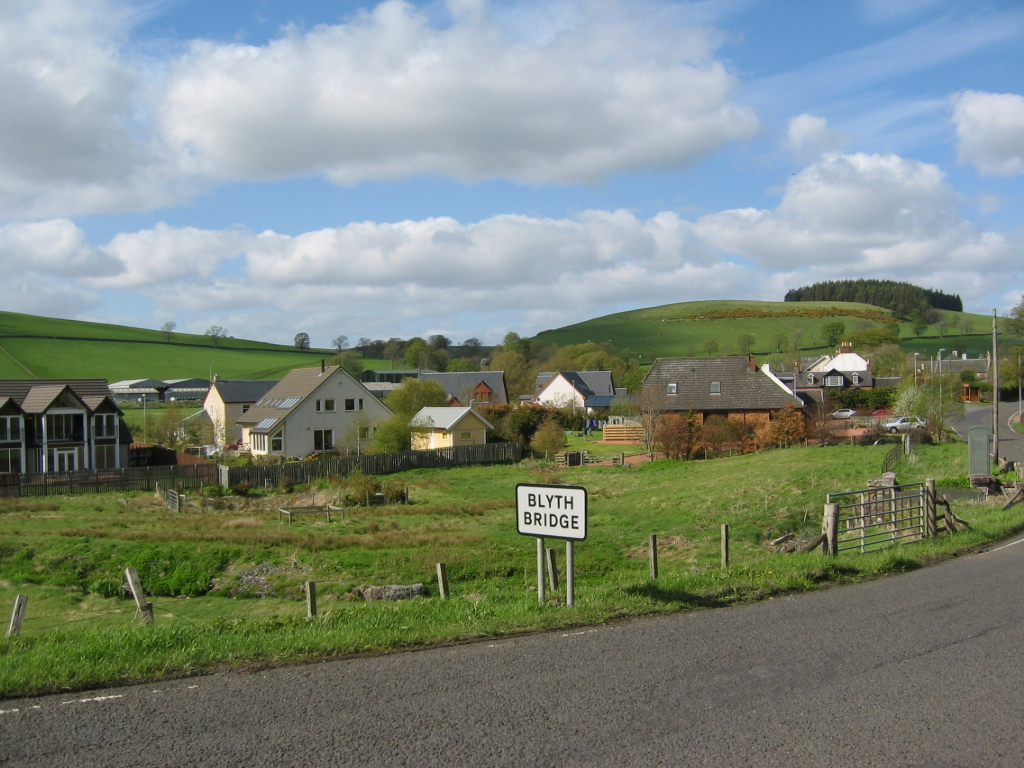
Blyth Bridge

Blyth Bridge is a small hamlet in the Scottish Borders area of Scotland, near to West Linton. The name stems from a bridge over the Tarth Water.

It is located in a bend on the A701 which goes from Moffat to Edinburgh, close to the junction with the East-West road the A72 which goes to Peebles.

Places nearby include the Lyne Water, Carlops, Romannobridge, and the Deepsyke Forest.

There is an aqueduct carrying a large water main which supplies Edinburgh and passes over Tarth Water.

There are a number of iron age forts on the hills nearby, and the historic Drochil Castle is a short distance away.

== Buildings ==
Much of the building stock in the village is modern. Two structures of interest are:

- Blyth Bridge War Memorial, c.1920, an unusual conical form 500m south of the village, freestanding on the edge of a field
- Scotston House, c.1755, an unusually slim Georgian villa laid out on an east-west axes, on higher ground 800m west of the village centre. This was built by Alexander Teller of Symington for his namesake son, and was sold in 1787 to Captain Aeneas Mackay of the East India Company. From around 1810 to 1905 it was owned by the Carmichaels of Skirling. Internal plasterwork was added by Alexander Morison of Edinburgh, 1757/8.

== Climate ==
Climate data for Blyth Bridge: 253 m (830 ft) 1991–2020 normals, extremes 1960–2006
Month	Jan	Feb	Mar	Apr	May	Jun	Jul	Aug	Sep	Oct	Nov	Dec	Year
Record high °C (°F)	13.0 (55.4)	14.4 (57.9)	17.8 (64.0)	24.4 (75.9)	26.0 (78.8)	27.7 (81.9)	28.4 (83.1)	28.5 (83.3)	25.5 (77.9)	19.4 (66.9)	15.4 (59.7)	12.6 (54.7)	28.5 (83.3)
Mean daily maximum °C (°F)	5.6 (42.1)	6.0 (42.8)	8.0 (46.4)	10.2 (50.4)	13.5 (56.3)	15.8 (60.4)	17.9 (64.2)	17.9 (64.2)	15.1 (59.2)	11.1 (52.0)	8.1 (46.6)	5.6 (42.1)	11.2 (52.2)
Daily mean °C (°F)	3.0 (37.4)	3.1 (37.6)	4.7 (40.5)	6.6 (43.9)	9.3 (48.7)	11.9 (53.4)	13.8 (56.8)	13.9 (57.0)	11.4 (52.5)	8.1 (46.6)	5.3 (41.5)	2.8 (37.0)	7.8 (46.1)
Mean daily minimum °C (°F)	0.3 (32.5)	0.3 (32.5)	1.4 (34.5)	2.8 (37.0)	5.1 (41.2)	7.9 (46.2)	9.7 (49.5)	9.8 (49.6)	7.7 (45.9)	4.9 (40.8)	2.4 (36.3)	0.0 (32.0)	4.4 (39.8)
Record low °C (°F)	−21.5 (−6.7)	−16.7 (1.9)	−17.7 (0.1)	−7.9 (17.8)	−4.4 (24.1)	−1.1 (30.0)	−0.1 (31.8)	1.0 (33.8)	−4.3 (24.3)	−7.5 (18.5)	−12.2 (10.0)	−16.3 (2.7)	−21.5 (−6.7)
Average precipitation mm (inches)	94.4 (3.72)	79.9 (3.15)	65.7 (2.59)	63.0 (2.48)	62.4 (2.46)	67.2 (2.65)	66.0 (2.60)	81.5 (3.21)	73.4 (2.89)	109.0 (4.29)	93.6 (3.69)	98.1 (3.86)	954.2 (37.59)
Average precipitation days	15.4	13.5	13.1	12.5	11.4	12.9	12.6	12.1	12.8	15.7	15.3	14.7	162
Source 1: Météo Climat
Source 2: KNMI (extremes)

== See also ==
- List of places in the Scottish Borders
- List of places in Scotland
