= Mendick =

Mendick may refer to:

- Danny Mendick, American baseball player
- Mendick Hill, a Marilyn near Tarth Water
