= John Huntar =

Businesspeople from Edinburgh

John Huntar (died 1579) was a Scottish farmer who kept livestock in Holyrood Park for Mary, Queen of Scots.

== Career ==
Huntar was a burgess of the Canongate, a district of Edinburgh which then had a separate administration. He became keeper of Holyrood Park during the regency of Mary of Guise and was paid a fee of £20 Scots. In 1559 and 1560 he built a house in the park, constructed a section of the park dyke, and employed masons and other labourers to repair boundaries, some of which had been destroyed by the villagers of Duddingston.

In 1563 he provided mutton to the royal household and bought and drove 77 cattle to Holyrood Park. 80 sheep were bought, and a barrel of tar and tallow was bought (to treat their feet). A would-be rustler, Thomas Bullerwell, was banished for stealing the Queen's sheep from the park in May 1563.

In 1564, Huntar provided meat to the royal household and 24 stones of wool worth £36-6s to the exchequer.

Huntar became the leaseholder of Holyrood Park on 20 March 1565, and was contracted to repair the boundary dykes and drainage ditches around the meadows. The lands included the Abbot's meadow and Grundles Myre, a marshy area extending towards Restalrig. In March 1567 Queen Mary upgraded his terms and he was to make improvements in Holyrood park, including planting broom to feed the sheep. Huntar, in return for the use of the land, supplied hay to the royal stables. He would be paid by the Comptroller of Scotland for his work.

Sheep belonging to "poor men of the town" were taken from the park in May 1571 during the Marian Civil War.

Hunter was married to Marion Cutler. After John Huntar's death, in January 1579 his heirs and executors made a claim against Alexander Durham, the "argentar" who managed the household expenses of Mary, Queen of Scots, saying he owed them £230 Scots for provisions sold by Huntar for the household between 6 February 1567 and Mary's abdication. Durham was said not to be liable, and also lived in Stirlingshire outside the remit of the Edinburgh commissary court. The executors were John Hart, James Hart, Thomas Hunter, Marion Cutler and her new husband Thomas Cherry.

A valley on Arthur's Seat is called Hunter's Bog. It is unclear if it is named after John Huntar.

=== Other contempories called John Hunter ===
There were contempories in Edinburgh of the same name, including the merchant John Hunter (died 1580) who became an Edinburgh burgess in December 1562, by right of his wife Margaret Aikman. In 1566, a tailor John Henderson was married to Margaret Hunter, the daughter of John Hunter, a Edinburgh burgess. A John Hunter associated with James Hart who contracted with John Acheson to work for the royal mint in 1559 may have been the same man as the keeper of Holyrood Park.

== James V and the royal flock ==
Mary's father, James V of Scotland kept sheep in Ettrick Forest, at Crawford Muir, and Thornton. Ettrick wool was stored in a loft in Selkirk, and then transported to Edinburgh and Leith. Robert Liddale was master of the flocks. The chronicle writer Robert Lindsay of Pitscottie claimed that Andrew Bell kept a royal flock of 10,000 in the formerly lawless Ettrick Forest. Wool from the royal steadings and farms was stored in the "foir loft" of the King's Wark at Leith in September 1537.

The English ambassador Ralph Sadler tried to encourage James V to close the monasteries and take their revenue so that he would not have to keep sheep like a mean subject. James replied that he had no sheep, he could depend on his god-father the King of France, and it was against reason to close abbeys that "stand these many years, and God's service maintained and kept in the same, and I might have anything I require of them." Sadler knew that James did farm sheep on his estates. After James' death 600 sheep were given to James Douglass of Drumlanrig.
