= David Forrest (mint official) =

David Forrest was a Scottish mint official, as the "General", and a supporter of the Scottish Reformation.

== Career ==
Forrest was treasurer to Haddington burgh council. He married Isobel Yule. Their eldest son, also called David, died in 1584. His name is sometimes spelled "Forres" or given as "Forrester".

John Knox mentions visiting Forrest at Haddington, East Lothian in 1546 while George Wishart was preaching in the town. During the war known as the Rough Wooing, Forrest offered some assistance to the English garrison at Haddington and may have been an "Assured Scot".

Mary of Guise appointed him General of the mint in 1554 and in 1556 an auditor of the exchequer. The General was a superior administrative officer. In 1555, Forrest employed an English technician or metallurgist called Meservy as master coiner. His work proved fraudulent and he was imprisoned in the Tolbooth.

According to Knox, Forrest was a moderate or temporiser who tried to prevent Protestants seizing the statue of St Giles carried in procession through Edinburgh on 1 September 1558.

Forrest went to England in November 1559. He returned to Scotland in 1561 and to his post at the mint, and was nominated by the General Assembly in 1560 and 1562 to be a minister of the kirk. He did not become a minister. In 1564, he was involved in payments made to John Huntar, who kept sheep for Mary, Queen of Scots, in Holyrood Park.

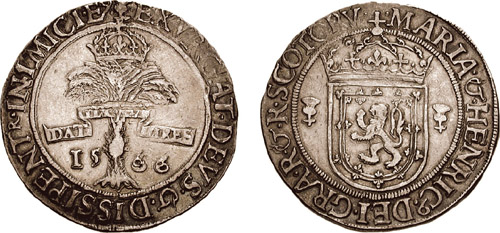
The 1566 silver rial of Mary, Queen of Scots

In December 1565, David Forrest, John Achesoun, and the officers of the mint were directed to coin a new "Marie ryall" worth 30 shillings, depicting a crowned palm tree, with a tortoise, called a "schell padocke" (a toad in a shell) climbing the trunk, with the motto "Dat Gloria Vires", with "Exurgat Deus et Dissipentur Inimici Eius" around the edge. On the other side the coin had the royal arms and an inscription for Mary and Lord Darnley, "Maria et Henricus Dei Gratia Regina et Rex Scotorum".

Forrest signed the audit of the exchequer accounts on 16 July 1567. After Mary, Queen of Scots, was captured at the battle of Carberry Hill, some of her silverware from Holyroodhouse Palace was sent to be minted into coins. Forrest signed receipts for silver plate at the mint on 14 August 1567.

Forrest also signed as a witness the band for mutual defence between William Kirkcaldy of Grange as Captain of Edinburgh Castle and Edinburgh town, represented by Simon Preston of Craigmillar, made on 8 May 1568. After the assassination of Regent Moray in January 1570, Forrest obtained a copy of a satirical pamphlet lampooning Knox and Moray which he gave to Alison Sandilands, the wife of John Cockburn of Ormiston. She gave it to John Knox. Richard Bannatyne noted the text in his Memoriales. During the Marian Civil War, Forrest received a bonus for working "in the time of trouble".

One of Forrest's books, John Calvin's Commentarii in Isaiam Prophetam (Geneva, 1551) is kept at the John Rylands Library. He signed the book on 17 July 1552.
