= John Provand =

Scottish merchant

John Provand (died 1610) was a Scottish merchant in 16th-century Edinburgh.

There was at this time a John Provand, Provost of the Collegiate Church of Abernethy, thought to be a different person.

Provand dealt in wool, cloth, and imported textiles, and had gained his rights to trade overseas from his first wife, Katherine Henryson, who remained involved in the family business. In 1577 a valuable cargo of his was seized by English sailors or pirates using a fly-boat of Rochester.

Perhaps during a trip to London to seek restitution for the loss of this cargo, Provand bought books and silk fabrics for the young James VI, who was at this time living at Stirling Castle. These included; John Cheke on Greek pronunciation, Petrus Ramus on logic, and Sebastian Münster's Cosmographia. On other occasions he sold Plutarch's Lives in two volumes and translations of the psalms by George Buchanan to the king's tutor Peter Young.

Provand supplied silver to the mint. In September and October 1580 with Robert Gourlay he supplied silver worth £78-7s-8d. Scots to the mint in Edinburgh to be coined. They were paid a further £2,123-7s-8d. outstanding for silver supplied.

When Regent Morton was arrested, Provand was asked about his meetings with him at Holyrood Palace. Provand said he had gone only to ask for a precept or warrant concerning wool which his wife had bought from him. Morton was to ask his tenants at Linton to carry the wool from Drochil to Edinburgh. When Morton was about to be executed on 2 June 1581, he was asked about the death of the Earl of Atholl in 1579 who was thought to have been poisoned, and it was suggested to him that John Provand had imported the poison.

The stock of the family business was listed after his first wife Katherine Henrysoun died in October 1583. Luxury textiles and other lines in their shop included plain and figured velvets, chamlets and taffeta, Scottish linen and Flemish linen, "Flanders Arras work" (patterned fabric rather than tapestry), embroidery silks, French pins, chamois leather, Flemish pewter, silk ribbons, velvet bonnets, and belts embroidered with counterfeit pearls for gentlewomen. It is probable that Morton's wool from the Scottish Borders was traded for Flanders goods. The will also lists money owing to Provand and his wife, and legacies to countless Henryson relations and their spouses, including the apothecary Alexander Barclay.

On 25 April 1584 the courtier John Gibb delivered a jewel, a tablet or locket with a diamond and an emerald, in a case, to the Provost of Edinburgh, Alexander Clark of Balbirnie, as a pledge for a loan of 6,000 merks or £4,000 Scots. In October 1589 the Provost John Arnot formally gave the jewel back to the king as a marriage gift. The jewel was delivered by Clark's son-in-law John Provand to William Fairlie, who commissioned the goldsmith David Gilbert to upgrade and refashion it for presentation to Anne of Denmark during her Entry to Edinburgh in May 1590.

At the Entry of Anne of Denmark, Provand was one of the town dignitaries appointed to hold up the canopy or paill over the queen.

During the North Berwick Witch Trials, Provand was said have been a frequent host of Ritchie Graham.

== Marriages ==
Provand married Katherine Henryson (died 1583). She seems to have been the widow of Thomas Henryson. Their daughter Isobel Henryson married the lawyer Oliver Colt.

Provand married secondly wife was Bathia Clark, a daughter of the Provost of Edinburgh and political intriguer Alexander Clark of Balbirnie and Marion Primrose. They obtained the lands of Caldhame and sold them to the schoolmaster Hercules Rollock in 1593. He had a son, also called John Provand.
