= Robert Gourlay (merchant) =

Scottish merchant (1530 – 1600)

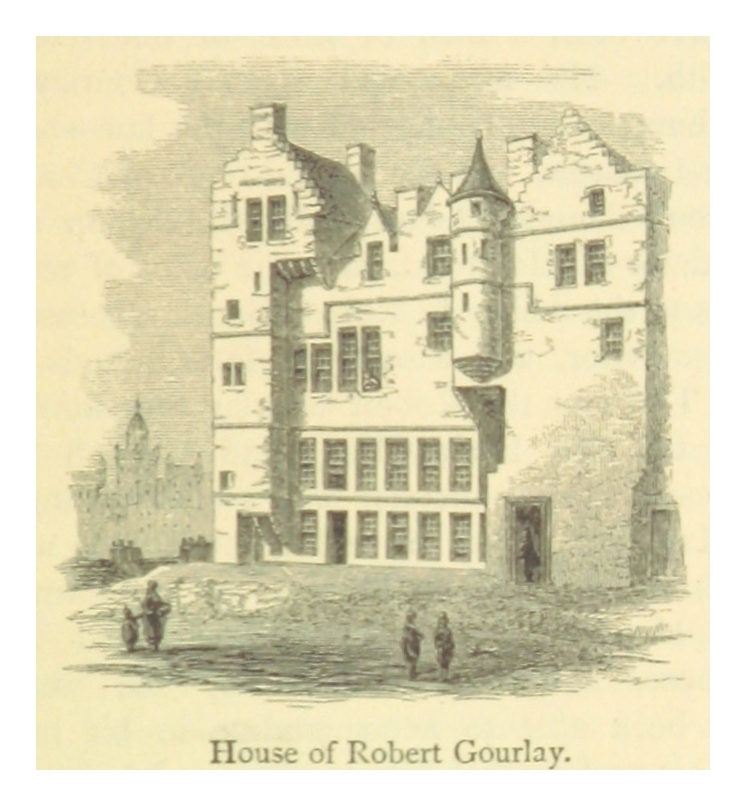
Robert Gourlay's house in Edinburgh before demolition

Robert Gourlay or Robin Gourlaw (c. 1530–c. 1600) was a wealthy Edinburgh merchant and Customer of Edinburgh who built a renowned house in Edinburgh (now demolished).

== Life ==
Robert Gourlay is first recorded in the employ of Regent Arran as a Groom of the Chamber and Wardrobe and was sometimes called the Regent's "chamber Child". The Regent bought clothes to wear and a horse to travel with, a measure of his importance in the household. In January 1552 he was called "Keeper of the Wardrobe". Another servant in the Wardrobe, the tailor Malcolm Gourlay was probably his older brother, or uncle.

In November 1570, as a merchant of Edinburgh, Gourlay supplied two hanks of gold thread to the Edinburgh tailor James Inglis and embroiderer John Young, for clothes for James VI of Scotland.

Regent Morton was a friend of Robert Gourlay, and allowed him to export grain, despite shortages. Gourlay was an elder of Edinburgh Kirk. In May 1574 the Kirk censured him for exporting grain and he was compelled to appear in St Giles Kirk at the "marriage place" wearing his best gown, which he was ordered to sell for the benefit of the poor. The Regent tried to insist to the minister James Lawson that Gourlay should not be punished, and publicly declared he had allowed Gourlay to export cereals despite the scarcity. The English ambassador in Edinburgh Henry Killigrew sent news of the incident to Francis Walsingham saying that it caused "some little grudging" and "unkindness" between the Kirk and Regent Morton. However, the historian Michael Lynch however suggests the affair did not cause a significant rift between Morton and the clergy.

As "Customar-General" of Edinburgh from 22 December 1573, Gourlay collected export and import customs and tolls due to the crown in Edinburgh. The National Records of Scotland has a number of receipts for payments made by Gourlay from the customs for the expenses of the royal household and Edinburgh Castle.

He was exempt from tax, and complained to the Privy Council of Scotland when he was made to contribute £30 Scots to the Burgh fund for the Entry of James VI into Edinburgh in 1579. In December 1582 he undertook to pay several royal debts to Edinburgh merchants totalling 550 French gold "crowns of the sun" out of the town's customs.

He also supplied silver to the mint. In September and October 1580 Robert Gourlay and Master John Provand supplied silver worth £78-7s-8d. Scots to the mint in Edinburgh to be coined. They were paid a further £2,123-7s-8d. outstanding for silver supplied by them.

Gourlay married Helen Cruik.

== Gourlay's house ==
The house was built on the Royal Mile on the south side of the Lawnmarket on lands and vacant lots, known as "waste", belonging to Gourlay and Helen Cruik and partly over an old lane called "Mauchan's Close". The earliest date marker on the house was "1569" carved in stone, the full inscription on the lintel reading "O Lord in The is Al My Traist 1569" (Oh Lord in Thee is All My Trust). In 1588 Robert's son John Gourlay built a new house abutting the south gable of the original. This bore the inscription "Spes Altera Vitae 1588".

James VI allowed the right of Robert Gourlay and Helen Cruik to have blocked Mauchan's close with a wall or "dyke" in 1588 and 1589. In later years the "Old Bank" or "Bank of Scotland" occupied the site until 1805. The entry became known as "Old Bank Close". The house was demolished in 1834.

In 1637 Robert Gourlay's grandson David Gourlay (d. 25 December 1644) sold the house to the lawyer Sir Thomas Hope of Craighall. Sir Thomas Hope bought the house for his son, Sir Thomas Hope of Kerse who lived there with his wife Helen Rae and their family until his death on 23 August 1644. It was then purchased by George Lockhart, Lord Carnwath.

The southern (1588) section of the building was the site of the first Bank of Scotland (founded in 1695) and remained here until 1805 when a custom-built bank was built to the north. This section of the building was also used as a printing press (over and above the printing of bank notes).

=== Guests and prisoners in Gourlay's house ===
Sir William Drury stayed in the house during the 'lang siege' of Edinburgh Castle in 1573. After the castle surrendered Sir William Kirkcaldy of Grange, his wife Margaret Learmonth, his brother, Alexander Home, 5th Lord Home, William Maitland of Lethington, his wife Mary Fleming the Lady Lethington, Henry Echlin of Pittadro, and the Countess of Argyll, Janet Cunningham were taken to the house as prisoners.

When Regent Morton was brought to Edinburgh (from Dumbarton Castle) for execution on 30 May 1581 he was imprisoned in Robert Gourlay's house for two days prior to his execution. The French ambassador Bertrand de Salignac de la Mothe-Fénelon lodged in the house in January 1583.

In June 1588 John Maxwell, 8th Lord Maxwell was held in the house as the prisoner of Sir William Stewart of Monkton. Monkton was killed by Francis Stewart, 5th Earl of Bothwell in Blackfriars Wynd a week later. During the uproar Maxwell tried to get away but was caught by the Provost of Edinburgh, John Arnot.

Colonel William Sempill, an agent of the Spanish empire, was to be held in the house in August 1588. He escaped on the first night from a window using a rope smuggled in by his mother. In another version of the escape story, Sempill's sister, Jean, Lady Ross, sent him three pies one of which contained a silk rope which Sempill used to escape while his guards were eating the other two pies. He reached the Grassmarket and evaded soldiers by pretending to be drunk.

The Earl of Huntly surrendered to Sir John Carmichael, captain of the king's guard, and Captain William Home at Terrisoul near Aberdeen, and was brought to Edinburgh to be warded in Robert Gourlay's house in May 1589. Colonel William Stewart was a prisoner in the house in July 1592.

James VI of Scotland found it convenient to lodge in the house on several occasions, rather than stay at Holyrood Palace. He was there on 3 April 1594.

=== Demolition ===
The house stood on Melbourne Place and was demolished for the construction of George IV Bridge. It was marked by a plaque on Lothian Regional Council on the site but this plaque was also lost on the demolition of that building in about 2005.
