= Murdoch Walker =

16th-century Scottish stonemason

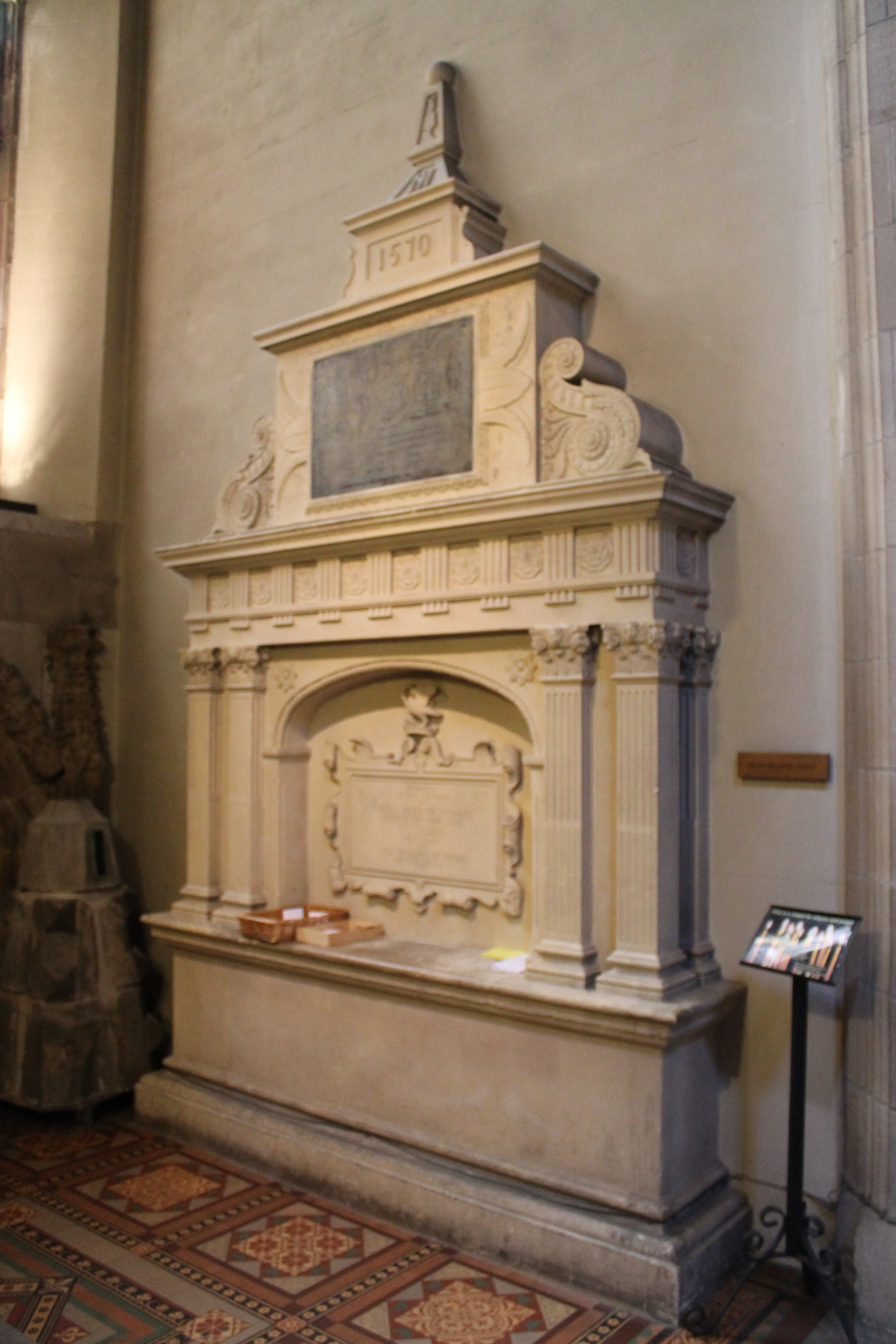
The restored monument for Regent Moray in St Giles Cathedral

Murdoch Walker (d. 1580) was a stonemason in 16th-century Edinburgh.

== Career ==
Murdoch Walker frequently worked on public buildings for Edinburgh's burgh council. In November 1560 he contracted to rebuild the hospital for poor bedesmen attached to Trinity College Kirk. He was to take down old buildings and repair the dyke or boundary wall.

The master of work for building the new hospital in November 1567 at Trinity College Kirk, Adam Fullarton, sold stones, lime, and sand in the Blackfriars kirk yard to the masons Thomas Jackson and Murdoch Walker.

In December 1565 a colleague in the Canongate, Andrew Hunter, named his son after him.

On 20 February 1570 Murdoch Walker and Jean Ryotel, a French master mason, were contracted to build a tomb in St Giles Kirk for Regent Moray. The contract was made between the two masons and John Wood on behalf of the Regent's widow, Agnes Keith, Countess of Moray, and written out by a notary Robert Ewyn. Ewyn, brother of the goldsmith Thomas Ewyn, was clerk to the Edinburgh incorporation of wrights and masons, and also a copyist of manuscript books. The tomb was to be built by the two masons over the Regent's grave in Saint Anthony's aisle, according to a "pattern and draft". A brass memorial plaque for the tomb, which cost £7, was engraved by a goldsmith, James Gray, for £20 Scots.

Walker was employed to mend the "west bulwark" at Leith in 1574 after storm damage. This was a pier extending the line of the Shore into the sea.

He died in July 1580.
