= William Birnie =

Scottish merchant (died 1568)

William Birnie or Birny (died 1568) was a Scottish merchant based in Edinburgh.

Birnie was one of the wealthiest merchants in Edinburgh.

Birnie married Helen or Ellen Acheson, a daughter of the goldsmith and mint official John Acheson. She had a daughter Margaret Fraser from a previous marriage. Margaret Fraser was married to Thomas Acheson, a master coiner in the Edinburgh mint. After Birnie's death, Helen Acheson married Archibald Stewart.

A family history gives a different and perhaps confused account of his marriage, relating that William Birnie married Margaret Fraser, a daughter of the laird of Philorth and Lord Saltoun, who had been a maid of honour to Mary, Queen of Scots. They had a son, the minister William Birnie, Minister of Ayr (1563-1619). After Birnie's death, Margaret Fraser was said to have married John Acheson.

By 1567 Birny had lent money to George Seton, 5th Lord Seton, accepting as security interests in lands which paid him a rental income, known as "fermes", including parts of Tranent and Seton in East Lothian.

With a business partner, Alexander Clark of Balbirnie, Birnie bought the lead from the roof of Elgin Cathedral in 1568 expecting a lucrative deal in scrap metal.

Birnie and Achesoun lent Regent Moray £700 Scots and held as security some of the jewels of Mary, Queen of Scots. These included some of the queen's "beltis and cousteris". The "couster", or in French a "cottouere" or "cotiere", was the gold chain that descended from a woman's girdle with its terminal pendant. One of these was described in Scots as, "ane belt with ane cowter of gold and ceyphres (ciphers) and roissis quheit and reid inamelit (roses enamelled white and red), contenand knoppis and intermiddis (entredeux) with cleik (clasp) and pandent 44 besyd the said pandent".

William Birnie died at Veere in October 1568. His factor at Veere, John Culper, held a large sum in cash, and a quantity of alum and madder used in the dyeing trade. Culper had acquired these materials in exchange for lead sent by Birnie. The £700 loaned to Regent Moray was not yet repaid when he died, and listed as an asset in his will.
