= Romannobridge =

Village in the Scottish Borders

Coordinates: 55°43′07″N 3°20′15″W

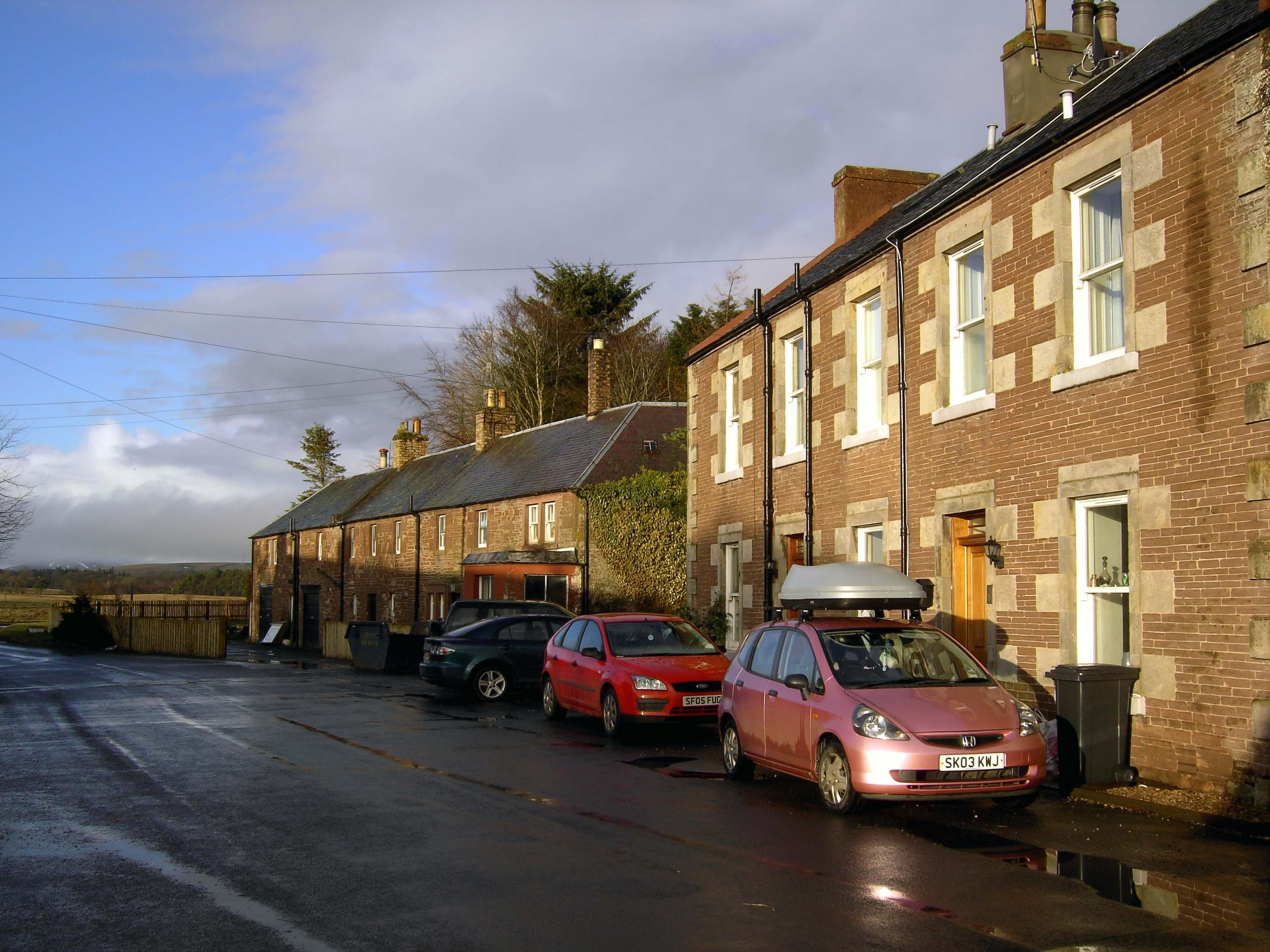
Romannobridge, February 2010

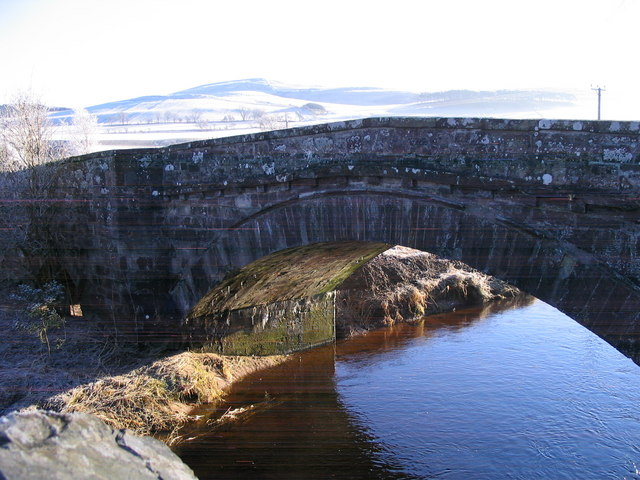
The namesake bridge

Romannobridge is a hamlet on the Lyne Water, on the A701, in the Scottish Borders.

Settlements nearby include West Linton, Halmyre, Dolphinton, Blyth Bridge, and Mountain Cross. The village is served by a community centre (the Newlands Centre), a small primary school (Newlands Primary) and a church (Kirkurd and Newlands Parish Church of Scotland).

The eponymous bridge itself was constructed in 1774. The large central arch is complemented by two small side arches set at higher level, which specifically address flood overflow.

Romannobridge is on the route of the main drovers' road for livestock headed to market in England, and is now a stop on the Cross Borders Drove Road long-distance path.

== See also ==
- List of places in the Scottish Borders
