= John Acheson (goldsmith) =

Scottish goldsmith, mining entrepreneur (1560–1581)

John Acheson (floruit 1554–1581) was a Scottish goldsmith, mining entrepreneur, and official of the mint.

== Career ==
He was the son of John Acheson, a denizen or burgess of Edinburgh, and Janet Fisher. This John Acheson, who had been appointed to collect a tax for Regent Arran with Hew Rig of Carberry in 1545, was killed at the battle of Pinkie in 1547. He had obtained lands at "Poikmyln" near Perth. Janet Fisher held these lands in 1566. She had to go to law over a portion of the land held from Scone Abbey, after new legislation was made about leases of church lands. Patrick Hepburn, Bishop of Moray, and Commendator of Scone tried to give the lands to his son Adam Hepburn.

Acheson was master coiner in Scottish mint, as was James Acheson, possibly his uncle. He was appointed as "sinkare", an engraver and die maker in the mint, in February 1555.

He lived in the Canongate of Edinburgh. This was a substantial house where the executor of Arbella Stuart, Thomas Fowler, was lodging in 1590 at the time of his death.

== The Scottish mint ==
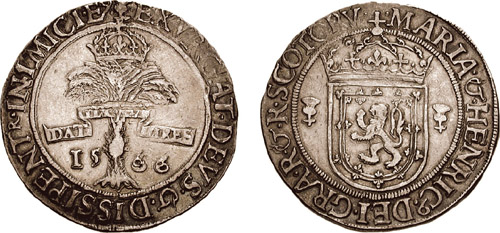
The 1566 silver rial of Mary, Queen of Scots

Acheson was in Paris in 1553 to engrave the portrait of Mary, Queen of Scots for coins. Acheson and his business partner John Aslowan received silver from the royal treasurer Robert Richardson, Prior of St Mary's Isle, to coin into testoons. In May 1559, Acheson was involved in minting a gold ducat of Mary, Queen of Scots and Francis II. He also made a contract with James Hart and John Hunter who would manage the work of refining silver.

In 1561, Acheson visited France to go to the queen and John Hart took his role at the mint. He wrote from Edinburgh to Mary in on April 1561, mentioning he had delivered her letters to Comptroller Villemore and others. The great and the poor in Scotland wished she would soon return. He had taken her letters to Hamilton to the Duke of Châtellerault.

In December 1565, David Forrest, Acheson, and the officers of the mint were directed to coin a new "Marie ryall" worth 30 shillings, depicting a crowned palm tree, with a tortoise, called a "schell padocke" (a toad in a shell) climbing the trunk, with the motto "Dat Gloria Vires", with "Exurgat Deus et Dissipentur Inimici Eius" around the edge. On the other side the coin had the royal arms and inscription for Mary and Lord Darnley, "Maria et Henricus Dei Gratia Regina et Rex Scotorum".

Mary Queen of Scots later used the emblem of the tortoise and the palm tree, with the same motto from Ovid, Tristia, V. 12, "Glory gives strength" in an embroidered panel among the Oxburgh Hall hangings. One source of the image may have been Hadrianus Junius, Emblemata (Antwerp, 1565). The image was used on a bed curtain.

Mary and Bothwell sent a font gifted by Elizabeth I at the baptism of Prince James to John Acheson in May 1567 to be made into coins before Carberry. The Confederate Lords arrived in Edinburgh and prevented this. Instead, on 10 July 1567, the Lords ordered her servant Servais de Condé to surrender silverware in his keeping for coining to Acheson. This included a silver gilt nef or ship for the queen's table.

In August 1567, Regent Moray ordered Acheson to coin a "James Ryall", depicting a crowned sword with the motto "Pro Me Si Merior in Me" and on the other side the royal arms with crowned letters "JR" for James VI, and the legend "Jacobus 6 Dei Gra Rex Scotorum."

During the Marian Civil War, in June 1572, conditions were agreed at Leith with Robert Richardson, as furnisher of the mint or "cunziehous" and Acheson to mint silver coins. In 1576, Regent Morton and John Acheson contracted with a Flemish metallurgist Abraham Peterson for the supply of refined silver. Peterson was also a business partner of the Flemish gold miner Cornelius de Vos, and became "melter of metal" in the mint in 1578.

In February 1580, Acheson was paid for riding to Stirling Castle, where the king had stayed over the previous decade, and back to Edinburgh eleven times, staying each time ten days or more.

John Acheson was confirmed as Master of the Mint in 1578. Other members of the Acheson family became officers of the mint, Thomas Acheson, master coiner, gave his name to groats worth eight pence minted in 1583. In 1597, John's son, James Acheson was master of the mint. He recommended a copper coinage of penny and two penny coins called placks, and these were minted using machinery to form the blanks. James Acheson mended two gilt ships or nefs for the king's table in 1602. He and Thomas Foulis made the dies for the coinage of 1605.

== Lead mines ==
John Acheson and his partner John Aslowan had a contract for lead mines in Glengonnar, or Leadhills, and Wanlock, granted by Mary, Queen of Scots in January 1562 allowing them to export lead ore to Flanders. In 1566, their rights were disputed by John Johnston, Robert Kerr, and John Gibson. Gibson had a contract for lead dating back to October 1560, which he had transferred to Johnston, James Lindsay and Aslowan. Johnston and Kerr were also factors for the Earl of Atholl, who had a tack or lease for lead mines, granted in 1565. The Privy Council found in favour of Johnston and Aslowan and their ‘ejection’ of Acheson.

== Marriage and children ==
John Acheson married Agnes Mason in 1568. Their children included:

- James Acheson, who became Master of the Mint, and married Mary Bowie. In 1598 James Acheson and an English man, Gavin Smith, received a patent for various new kind of pumps for draining mines and coal workings.
- Elene or Helen Acheson (d. 1584), who married the merchant William Birnie, and secondly, Archibald Stewart, Provost of Edinburgh. Their initials "AS EA" were engraved on the cup known as the "Galloway Mazer", now displayed at the National Museum of Scotland. In September 1569 Regent Moray granted them the customs of the "New haven of Preston" known as Acheson's Haven. Helen Acheson took several jewels of Mary, Queen of Scots as security for loans during the Marian Civil War.
- John Acheson

He is also said to have married Margaret Hamilton.
