= Maurice Lee (historian) =

American historian

Maurice Lee, junior (1925–2020) was an American historian. His research and publications concerned the history of Scotland.

== Career ==
Lee was born in Buffalo, New York, and studied at the Hotchkiss School. He gained his PhD at Princeton University in 1950. He taught at Douglass College at Rutgers University. Lee became the Margaret A. Judson Professor of History emeritus at Rutgers University. He died on 12 July 2020.

Maurice Lee and Jenny Wormald had a scholarly debate on the nature of Scottish kingship the reign of James VI and I, published in successive issues of the history journal Scotia in 1978. Lee's position followed the work of Geoffrey Elton, and the view that King James was a monarch in a new style, while Wormald contended that James ruled as a traditional monarch.

== Selected publications ==
- Dearest Brother: Lauderdale, Tweeddale and Scottish Politics, 1660–1674 (Edinburgh: John Donald, 2010).
- Great Britain's Solomon: James VI and I in His Three Kingdoms (University of Illinois Press, 1990).
- "James I and the Historians: Not a Bad King After All?", Albion, 16:2 (1984).
- "King James's Popish Chancellor", in Ian B. Cowan & Duncan Shaw, Renaissance and Reformation in Scotland (Edinburgh, 1983).
- Government by Pen: Scotland under James VI and I (University of Illinois, 1980).
- "James VI's Government of Scotland after 1603", Scottish Historical Review, 55:159, Part 1 (April 1976).
- Dudley Carleton to John Chamberlain, 1603–1624 (Rutgers University Press, 1972).
- John Maitland of Thirlestane and the foundation of Stewart despotism in Scotland (Princeton, 1959).
- "The Fall of the Regent Morton: A Problem in Satellite Diplomacy", Journal of Modern History, 28:2 (1956).
- James Stewart, Earl of Moray: A Political Study of the Reformation in Scotland (New York, 1953).
