= Tarth Water =

River in the Scottish Borders, Scotland

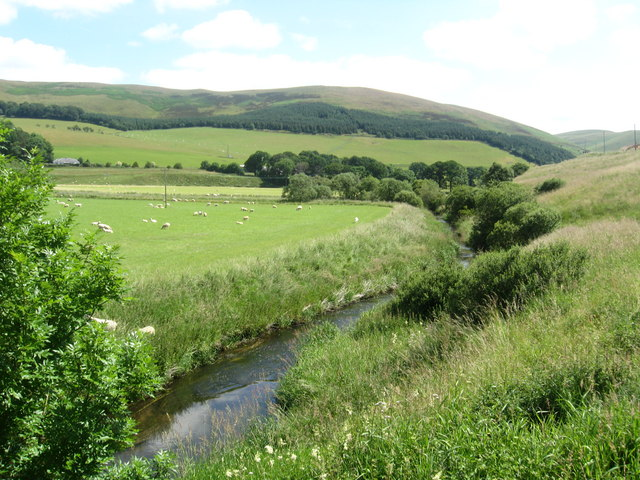
- Tarth Water

- Location within Scotland
- Location: Peeblesshire
- Coordinates: 55.6723°N 3.3291°W -->
- Basin countries: Scotland

The Tarth Water is a river in Peeblesshire, in the Scottish Borders. It forms part of the River Tweed system. The river with a total length of 7.1 miles, rises on Mendick Hill, a Marilyn, and flows past the villages of Dolphinton and Blyth Bridge before converging at Drochil Castle with the Lyne Water, a tributary of the Tweed.

== See also ==
- List of rivers of Scotland
- List of places in the Scottish Borders
- List of places in Scotland
