= Drochil Castle =

Castle in Scottish Borders, Scotland

Coordinates: 55°40′40″N 3°20′03″W

- near Peebles, Scottish Borders
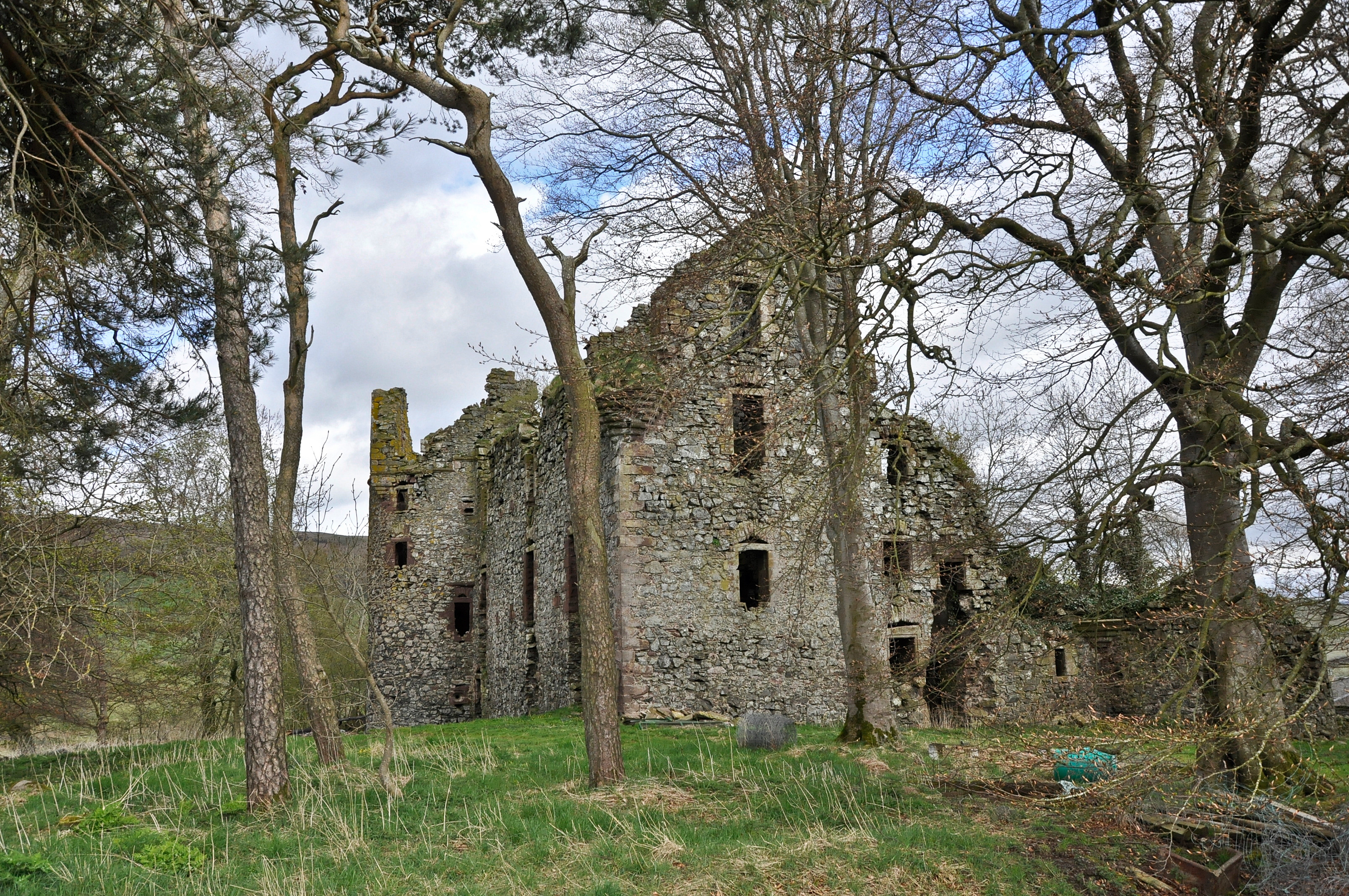
- Drochil Castle

Scheduled monument
- Official name: Drochil Castle
- Type: Secular: castle; tower
- Designated: 28 April 1928
- Reference no.: SM1495

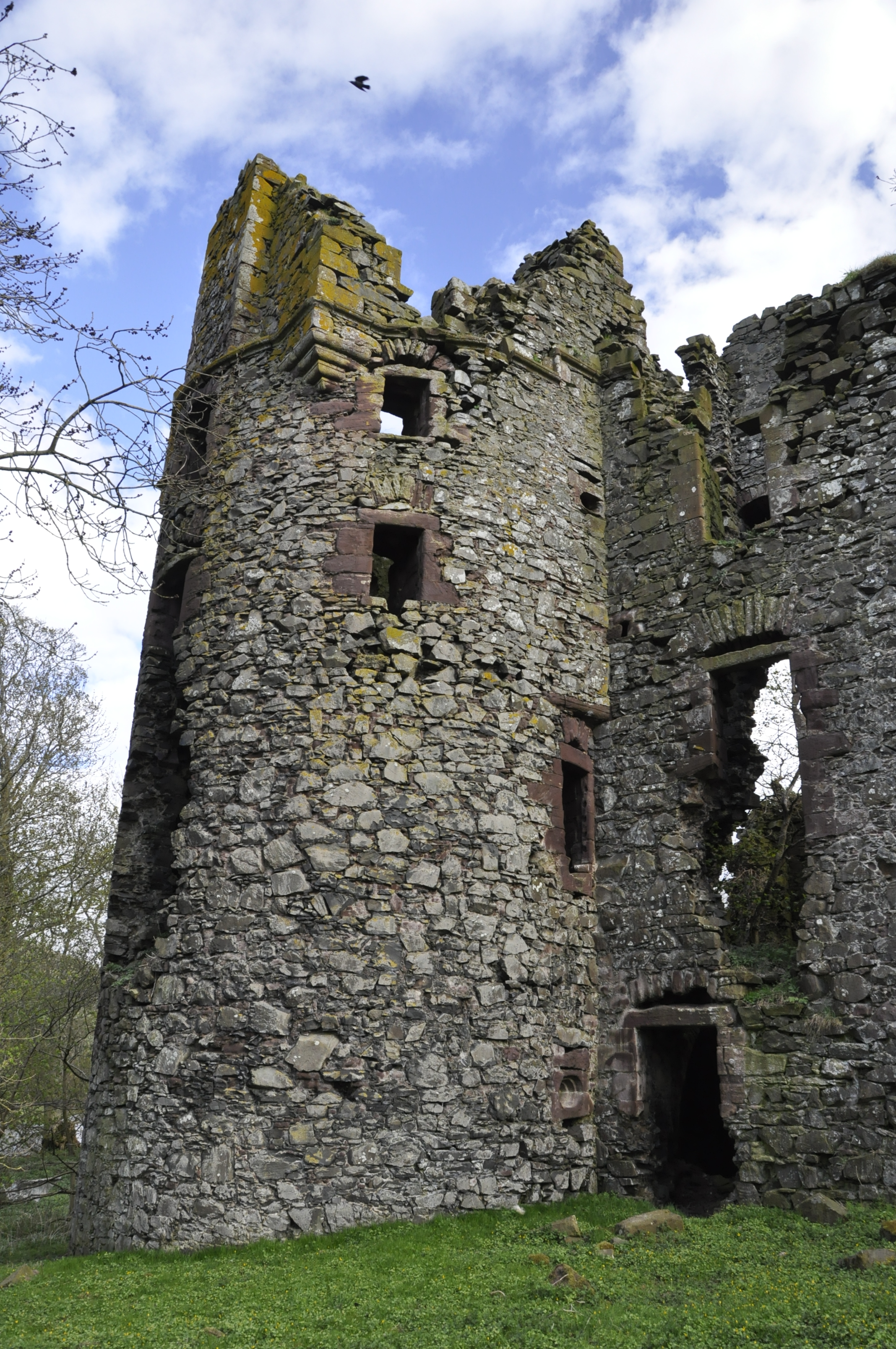
The north-east tower

Drochil Castle is a ruined castle in the Scottish Borders. It is located above the Lyne Water, 10 kilometres (6.2 mi) north-west of Peebles, and 8 kilometres (5.0 mi) south of West Linton.

James Douglas, 4th Earl of Morton, Regent of Scotland, started building Drochil Castle in 1578, three years before his execution by King James VI. It was no more than half built on his death and was never finished.

The castle, consisting of four storeys and a garret, was as much a palace as a castle, as Morton intended to retire here from worldly business. The castle is of exceptional interest because of its design as a "double-tenement" with a wide central corridor running through the building from end to end on every storey. This opens up suites of apartments off it on either side. The castle has a round tower, 25 feet (7.6 m) in diameter, attached to each of two diagonally opposite corners. Each tower has two gunloops, preventing enemies from approaching the walls. On the first floor, the great hall measured 50 by 22 feet (15.2 by 6.7 m).

Morton sold the wool from his Drochil estates to a merchant, John Provand, and his tenants from Linton carted it to Edinburgh.

In 1686, the castle was purchased by William Douglas, 1st Duke of Queensberry, and the ruins are still owned by his descendant the Duke of Buccleuch. The outer walls consist of whinstone rubble, quarried at Broomlee Hill, dressed with red sandstone. In the early 19th century, stone was taken to build the adjacent farm. The ruin is protected as a scheduled monument.
