= James Douglas, 4th Earl of Morton =

Regent of Scotland during the minority of King James VI

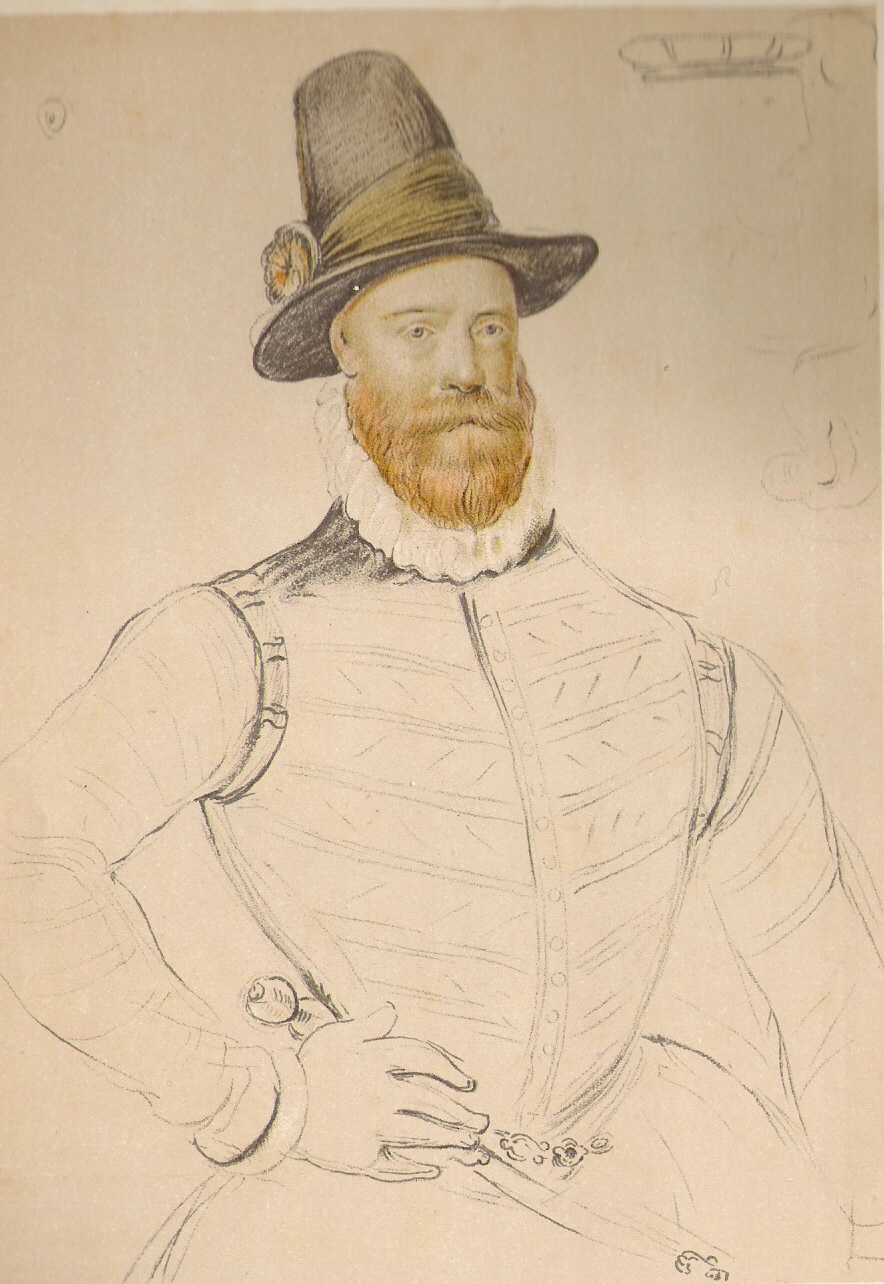
James Douglas, 4th Earl of Morton

James Douglas, 4th Earl of Morton (c. 1516 – 2 June 1581) was a Scottish nobleman. He played a leading role in the murders of Queen Mary's confidant, David Rizzio, and king consort Henry Darnley. He was the last of the four regents of Scotland during the minority of James VI. He was in some ways the most successful of the four since he won the civil war that had been dragging on with the supporters of the exiled Mary, Queen of Scots. However, he came to an unfortunate end, executed by means of the Maiden, a predecessor of the guillotine.

== Biography ==
=== Early life ===
James Douglas was the second son of Sir George Douglas of Pittendreich, Master of Angus, and Elizabeth Douglas, daughter of David Douglas of Pittendreich. He wrote that he was over 61 years old in March 1578, so was probably born around 1516. Before 1543, he married Elizabeth, daughter of James Douglas, 3rd Earl of Morton, and became known as the "Master of Morton". In 1553, James Douglas succeeded to the title and estates of his father-in-law, including Dalkeith House in Midlothian and Aberdour Castle in Fife. His wife, Elizabeth Douglas suffered from mental illness, as did her two elder sisters Margaret and Beatrix, who were married to Regent Arran and Robert Maxwell, 6th Lord Maxwell. James and Elizabeth's children did not survive to adulthood, except three daughters who were declared legally incompetent in 1581. James also had five illegitimate children.

At the start of the war now known as the Rough Wooing, James Douglas, as Master of Morton, was briefly beseiged at the Castle of Dalkeith by Regent Arran for his "affection to England". James and his brother David communicated with Henry VIII of England on the possibility of their surrendering Tantallon Castle to the English army that burnt Edinburgh in 1544. The English commander Lord Hertford wrote to the Master of Morton in April 1544, discussing his journey towards Berwick-upon-Tweed, and hoping he could leave the castles of Dalkeith and Tantallon in the hands of allies.

However, four years later he defended Dalkeith Castle against the English and was captured in June 1548, "sore hurt on the thigh", and taken as a hostage to England. After the Treaty of Boulogne in 1550, James was exchanged for the English soldier John Luttrell, returned from captivity in England, and began to use his title of "Earl of Morton".

James's political activities and allegiances during the Scottish Reformation were at first equivocal in 1559, but in February 1560 he signed the Treaty of Berwick which invited an English army into Scotland to expel the Catholic regime of Mary of Guise. He took part in the unsuccessful embassy to England in November 1560 to treat for the marriage of Elizabeth I of England to James Hamilton, 3rd Earl of Arran. On their way back from London, Grey de Wilton hosted the Scottish ambassadors at Berwick and gave James a personal tour of the latest fortifications there.

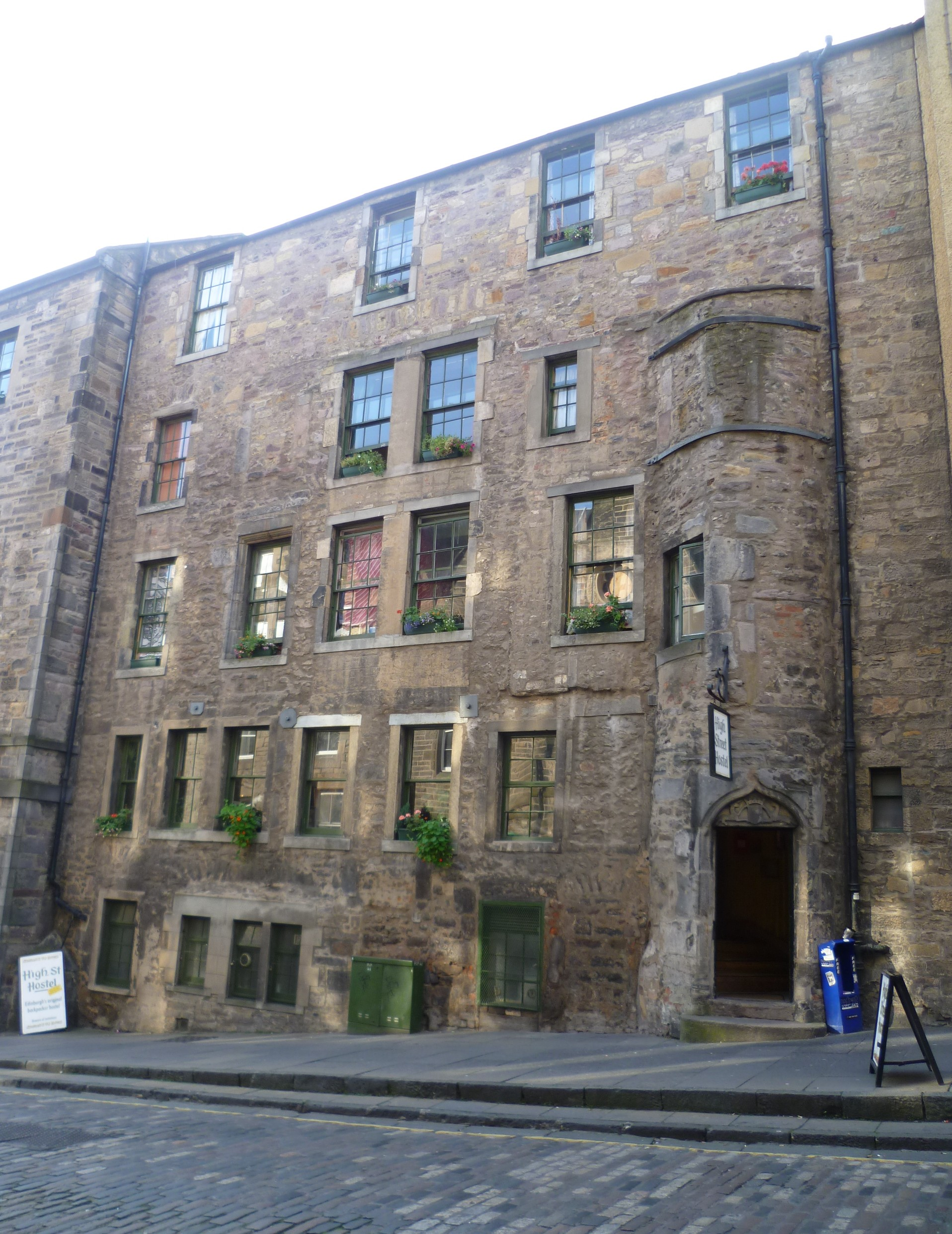
Morton's town house in Edinburgh is now a backpackers' hostel

In 1563 he became Lord Chancellor of Scotland. Though his sympathies were with the reformers, he took no part in the combination of Protestant reformers in 1565, but he headed the armed force which took possession of Holyrood Palace in March 1566 to effect the assassination of David Rizzio, and the leading conspirators adjourned to Morton's house while a messenger was sent to obtain Queen Mary's signature to the "bond of security".

The Queen, before complying with the request, escaped to Dunbar, and Morton and the other leaders fled to England. Having been pardoned, Morton returned to Scotland early in 1567, and with 600 men appeared before Borthwick Castle, where the Queen had taken refuge after her marriage to Bothwell. Morton attended the remarkable stand-off at the battle of Carberry Hill in June 1567, where Mary's new husband, James Hepburn, 4th Earl of Bothwell offered to settle the matter by single combat. When Patrick, Lord Lindsay took up the challenge, Morton gave Lindsay the sword of his ancestor, Archibald Douglas, 5th Earl of Angus. Mary vetoed a fight and surrendered. Morton took an active part in obtaining the consent of the queen, while she was imprisoned at Lochleven Castle, to her abdication in July 1567. When Mary escaped from Lochleven, he led the vanguard of the army which defeated her forces at the Battle of Langside in 1568, and he was the most valued privy counsellor of the Earl of Moray during the latter's brief term of office as Regent of Scotland.

=== Regent of Scotland ===
Scotland was now ruled by regents on behalf of Mary's infant son, James VI, who faced a civil war. James Stewart, Regent Moray, Mary's half-brother, was assassinated in Linlithgow in January 1570. Morton was worried that Mary might escape and make her way back to Scotland, by feigning sickness during a dance and disguising herself in male apparel, riding away in disguise with a messenger, or cutting her hair and smearing dirt on her face so she looked like a scullion who turned the spit in the kitchen. He wrote to William Cecil, and Queen Elizabeth in April 1571 wrote to the Earl of Shrewsbury at Sheffield Castle to be vigilant.

Matthew Stewart, Regent Lennox died from a gunshot wound after a struggle on the streets of Stirling. On 18 November 1571, the new Regent, John Erskine, Earl of Mar, sent Morton with Robert Pitcairn, Commendator of Dunfermline and James MacGill of Nether Rankeillour to negotiate with Elizabeth's representative Henry Carey, 1st Baron Hunsdon, Governor of Berwick upon Tweed. Mar wanted English help to capture Edinburgh Castle from Sir William Kirkcaldy of Grange who held it for Mary. Regent Mar hoped that Morton could arrange for 12 cannons, 3,000 foot soldiers, and wages for the 800 Scottish foot soldiers and 200 horsemen already in the field. Morton was instructed to offer six hostages to England from the sons of the nobility who supported James VI. He also discussed returning the Earl of Northumberland, who was a fugitive after the failed Rising of the North, to England.

A week later Morton wrote to Hunsdon with the same request, urging an attack in winter because the Castle was vulnerable when the Nor Loch was frozen. Hunsdon replied that Elizabeth still hoped for a peaceful settlement, but he would send an estimate of the expedition's cost to Elizabeth. Morton received a token payment. The English rebels were handed over. The treaty for military aid was still not finalised when Mar died at Stirling in October 1572.

On 24 November 1572, a month after the death of Regent Mar, Morton, who had been the most powerful noble during Mar and Lennox's rule, at last reached the object of his ambition by being elected regent. As Regent of Scotland, Morton expected the support of England and Elizabeth, and a week after his election, he wrote to William Cecil, Lord Burghley following his discussions with the English ambassador Henry Killigrew:

The knowledge of her Majesty's meaning has chiefly moved me to accept the charge (the Regency), resting in assured hope of her favourable protection and maintenance, especially for the present payment of our men-of-war their bypast wages, "without the quhilk I salbe drevin in mony great inconvenientis."

In many respects, Morton was an energetic and capable ruler. His first achievement was the conclusion of the civil war in Scotland against the supporters of the exiled Mary. In February 1573 he effected a pacification with George Gordon, 5th Earl of Huntly, the Hamiltons and other Catholic nobles who supported Mary, at Perth with the aid of Elizabeth's envoy, Henry Killigrew. Edinburgh Castle still held out for Mary under the command of William Kirkcaldy of Grange and William Maitland of Lethington, and after a long siege the castle was taken on 27 May 1573, aided by English artillery and soldiers which finally arrived under William Drury. Due to the subsequent execution of the leaders of the castle garrison, there was now no longer any chance of Mary's restoration by native support.

In July 1573 Morton had the king's chamber at Stirling Castle panelled, 60 new gold buttons made for his clothes, and gave him a football. He made efforts to recover jewels belonging to Mary, including the Great H of Scotland, which were held by Agnes Keith, Countess of Moray and others.

In 1575 Morton obtained six "snaphaunce" musket hand guns from Flanders to serve as patterns for long guns called "calivers". The Edinburgh gunmakers were ready to make 50 every week, they also made pistols called "dags" which equipped most of the gentlemen of Scotland. He sent goldsmith Michael Sym to London for tools for the royal mint. Sym was also sent to buy silver plate for Morton and have some rubies cut for him. Morton made a leisurely progress in September 1575, travelling from Dalkeith Palace with Lord Claud Hamilton to Linlithgow, Torwood Castle, Lochleven, and Stirling Castle where he hunted in the park. He then went to Kincardine Castle, Tullibardine Castle, Ruthven Castle, and Ballinbreich in Fife, before arriving at his own Aberdour Castle.

While all now seemed to favour Morton, under-currents combined to procure his fall. The Presbyterian clergy were alienated by his leaning to Episcopacy, and all parties in the divided Church disliked his seizure of its estates. Andrew Melville, who had taken over as leader of the Kirk from John Knox, was firmly against any departure from the Presbyterian model and refused to be won by a place in Morton's household. Morton rigorously pursued the collection of a third of the income from every Church benefice, a revenue that had been allocated to finance the King's household. Morton had discretion to exempt persons and institutions from paying these thirds, and the historian George Hewitt found no striking evidence of bias in Morton's exemptions.

In 1577 Morton was granted the barony of Stobo. However, over the next few months, opposition to Morton grew, led by the Earl of Argyll and the Earl of Atholl, both leading Roman Catholics and members of the Queen's party, in league with Alexander Erskine of Gogar, governor of Stirling Castle and custodian of the young James VI.

=== Resignation ===
Morton was finally forced to resign as Regent in March 1578 but retained much of his power. He wrote a memorandum setting out his service to King James, including swearing his coronation oath, recovering Edinburgh Castle from his enemies, and spending £10,000 rebuilding it. He surrendered Edinburgh Castle, Holyrood Palace, the Great Seal and the jewels and Honours of Scotland, retiring for a while to Lochleven Castle, where he busied himself in laying out gardens. On 10 March, James VI issued a proclamation recognising that many in Scotland "misliked" the regiment of Morton, who had now resigned, and James would now accept the burden of the administration. The King was eleven years old.

Queen Elizabeth wrote to her agents in Scotland expressing her astonishment and displeasure because, as she was convinced her influence had brought Morton to the regency, his forced resignation reflected badly on her. If Morton was now to be accused of bad government, she instructed her diplomats Thomas Randolph and Robert Bowes to defend him by saying that his accusers should have first appealed to England to pressure Morton to reform his administration.

=== President of the Privy Council ===
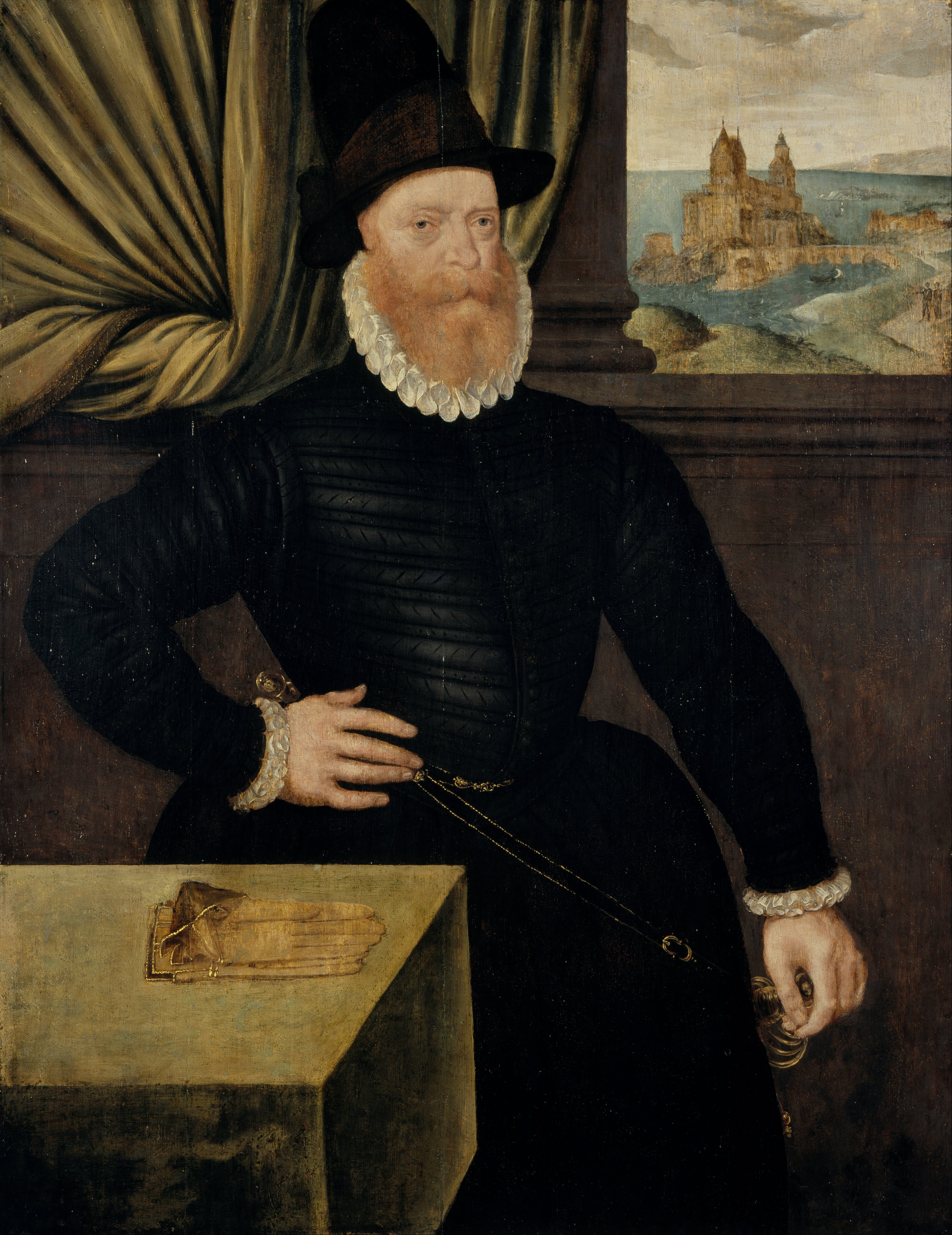
James Douglas, c. 1578, by Arnold Bronckorst, Scottish National Portrait Gallery

On 27 April 1578, by the action of John Erskine (son of Regent Mar) and his brothers, the Commendators of Cambuskenneth and Dryburgh, Morton gained possession of Stirling Castle and the person of the king, regaining his ascendancy. On 12 August 1578, the forces of his opponents faced his army at Falkirk, but a truce was negotiated by two Edinburgh ministers, James Lawson and David Lindsay, and the English resident Robert Bowes. A nominal reconciliation was effected, and a parliament at Stirling introduced a new government. Morton, who secured an indemnity, was president of the council, but Atholl remained a privy councillor in an enlarged council with the representatives of both parties. Shortly afterwards Atholl died (allegedly of poison) and suspicion pointed to Morton. His return to power was brief, and the only important event was the prosecution of the two Hamiltons who still supported Mary. In the spring of 1579, the Scottish government's forces moved to crush the power of the Hamilton family in the west, and Claude Hamilton and his brother John Hamilton fled to England. Morton would later deny that this was his initiative. The final fall of Morton came from an opposite quarter.

In May 1579, at St Andrews, an eccentric called Skipper Lindsay publicly declared to Morton in the King's presence during the performance of a play that his day of judgement was at hand. In September, Esmé Stewart, Sieur d'Aubigny, the king's cousin, came to Scotland from France, gained the favour of James by his courtly manners, and received the lands and earldom of Lennox, the custody of Dumbarton Castle, and the office of chamberlain. The young James VI was declared to have reached his majority and formally began his personal rule with some ceremony in Edinburgh in September 1579, and the period of the Regents was concluded.

=== Arrested and accused ===
On 31 December 1580, an associate of Lennox, James Stuart, Earl of Arran, son of Lord Ochiltree and brother-in-law of John Knox, accused Morton at a meeting of the council in Holyrood of complicity in the murder of Darnley, and he was at once committed to custody in Holyroodhouse and taken to Dumbarton Castle in the Lennox heartland.

Morton was brought back to Edinburgh and lodged at Robert Gourlay's house on 27 May. He was condemned by an assize at the Tolbooth on 1 June, presided over by John Graham, Lord Hallyards, for having taken part in the Darnley's murder. He confessed that the Earl of Bothwell had revealed to him the design, although he denied participation, "art and part", in its execution. The Earl of Montrose pronounced him guilty.

=== Execution ===
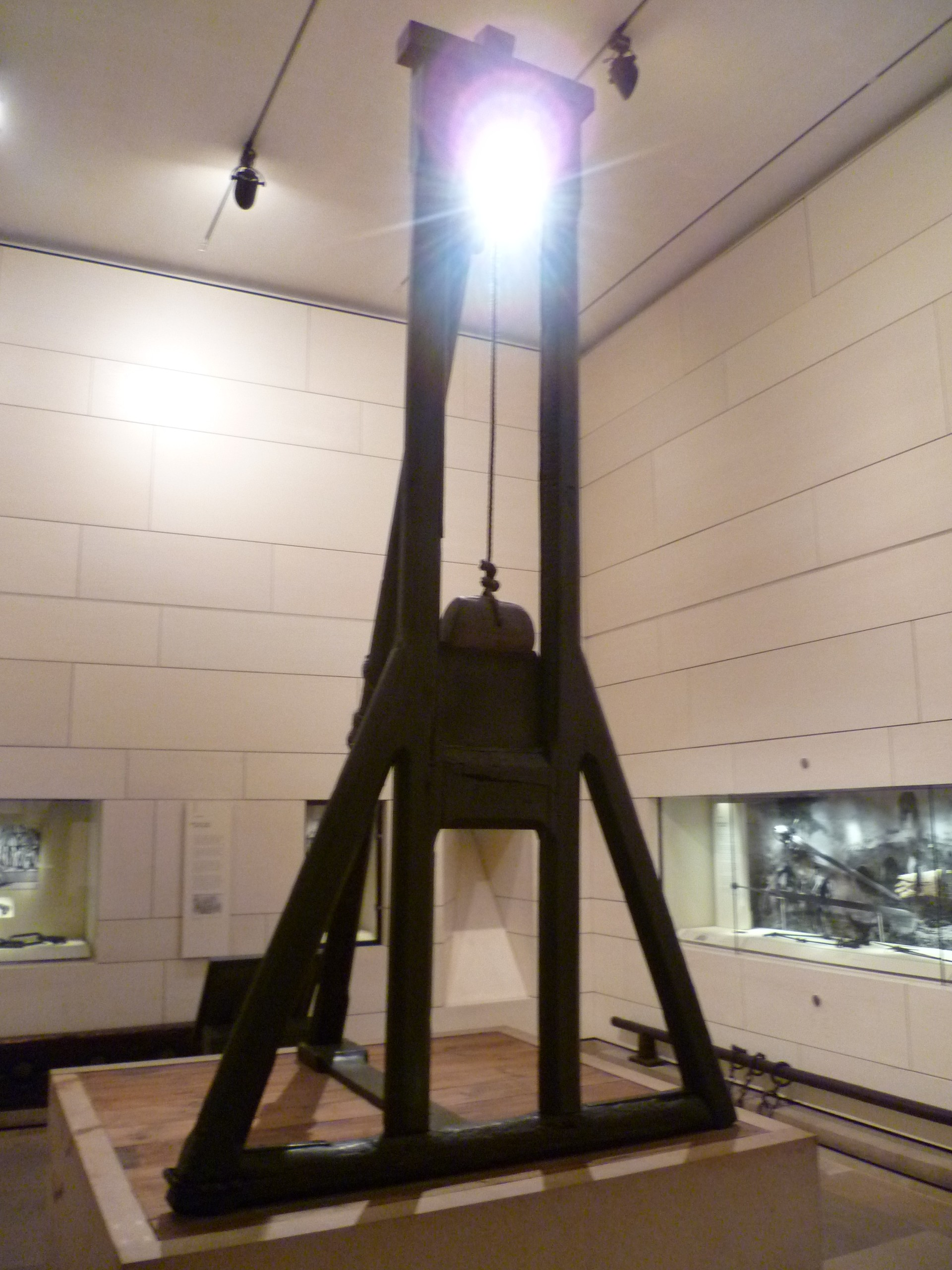
The "Maiden" in the National Museum of Scotland

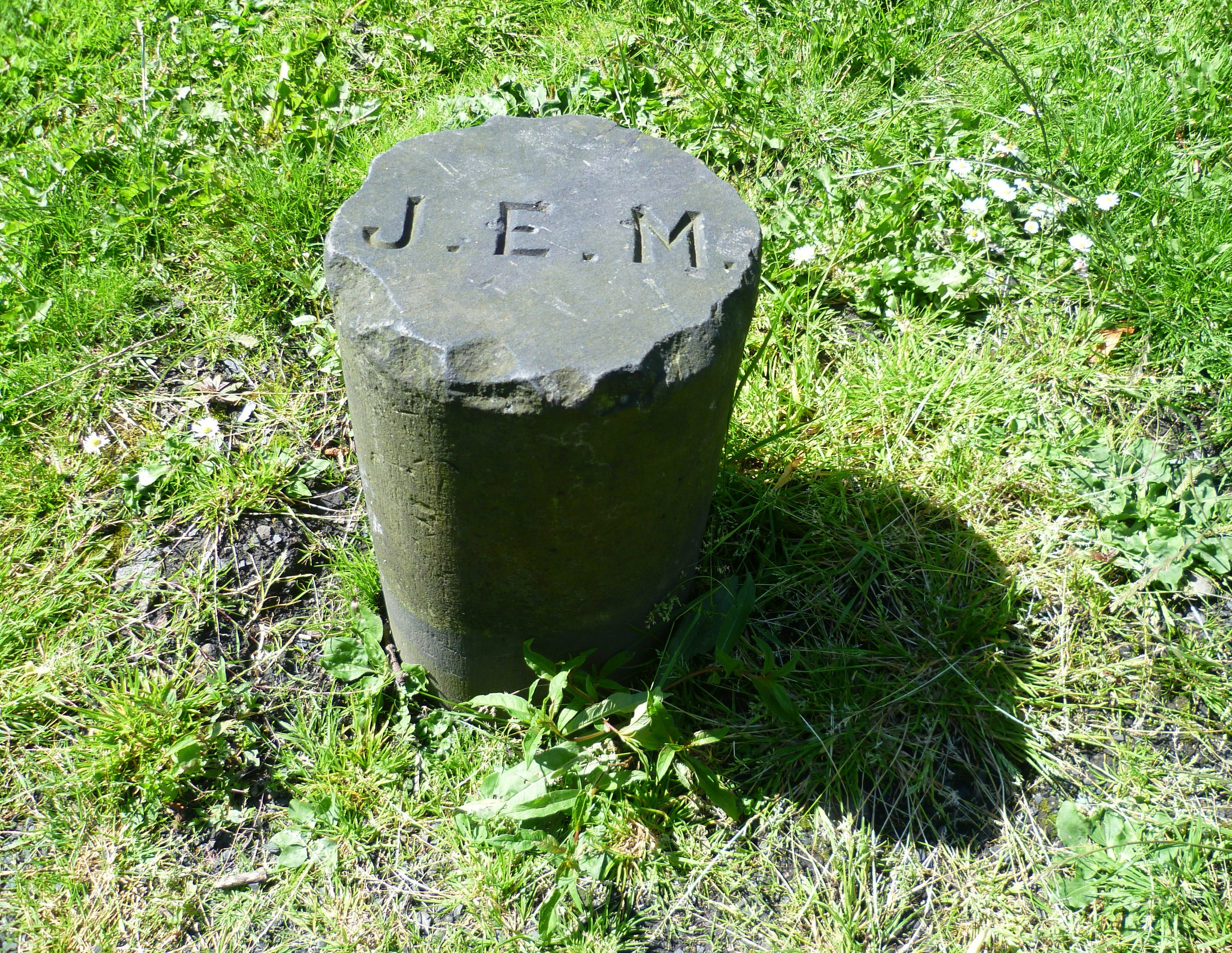
Stone marker in Greyfriars Kirkyard

Morton was brought to Edinburgh on 30 May 1581 and confined in the house of Robert Gourlay on the Royal Mile. He was accompanied by a servant, William Stewart, who witnessed that he slept well on the night after he was condemned. Before his execution Morton made a confession in a conversation with John Durie and Walter Balcanquhall.

He was executed on 2 June 1581, attended by James Lawson of St Giles. The method of his execution was the maiden, an early form of guillotine modelled on the Halifax gibbet. According to tradition, Morton brought it personally from England, having been "impressed by its clean work", but records show that it was made at the order of Edinburgh's Town Council in 1564 by Patrick Schang. David Hume of Godscroft appears to have initiated the legend of Morton's maiden in his History of the House of Angus (1644), writing "the axe (of the Maiden, which he himself had caused make after the patterne which he had seen in Halifax in Yorkshire) falling upon his neck, put an end to his life".

Morton's corpse remained on the scaffold for the following day, until it was taken for burial in an unmarked grave at Greyfriars Kirkyard. His head, however, remained on "the prick on the highest stone", (a spike) on the north gable of the Tolbooth of Edinburgh (outside St Giles Cathedral) for eighteen months, until it was ordered to be reunited with his body in December 1582.

Morton's final resting place is reputedly marked by a small sandstone post incised with the initials "J.E.M." for James Earl of Morton. The post is more probably a Victorian marker for a lairage. In the very unlikely event that a marker was permitted for an executed criminal, the inscribed initials would have been "J.D." and, secondly, it would have been cleared away in 1595 when all stones were removed from Greyfriars.

=== Widow, daughters, and the Morton title ===
After the execution of her husband, Morton's wife, Dame Elizabeth Douglas was found by an inquest to be incapable of managing her affairs, as she was "idiot and prodigal" in the language of the time. King James VI signed a warrant to appoint a legal guardian called an "administrator and tutor" to supervise and protect her property.

The title of Earl of Morton passed by charter to the son of Dame Elizabeth Douglas's sister Beatrix, John Maxwell, 8th Lord Maxwell. Maxwell had been in dispute with Regent Morton over the title, and while the former Regent was in prison, Maxwell had made a contract with the Duke of Lennox on 29 April 1581. Lennox would work to give Maxwell rights over the Morton earldom, and make him the legal guardian of James Douglas and Dame Elizabeth's three daughters. The three sisters, like their mother, would be declared incapable by a "brieve of idiotry". In 1586, however, the title was given to Archibald Douglas, 8th Earl of Angus, a nephew and legal heir of Regent Morton. Maxwell was still able to use the title, though it did not descend to his heirs.

Regent Morton had sons (including James Douglas of Spott) by other women. The barony of Stobo was confiscated by the Crown and was granted to the Chancellor of Scotland, John Maitland, in 1587.

== Drochil Castle and other buildings ==
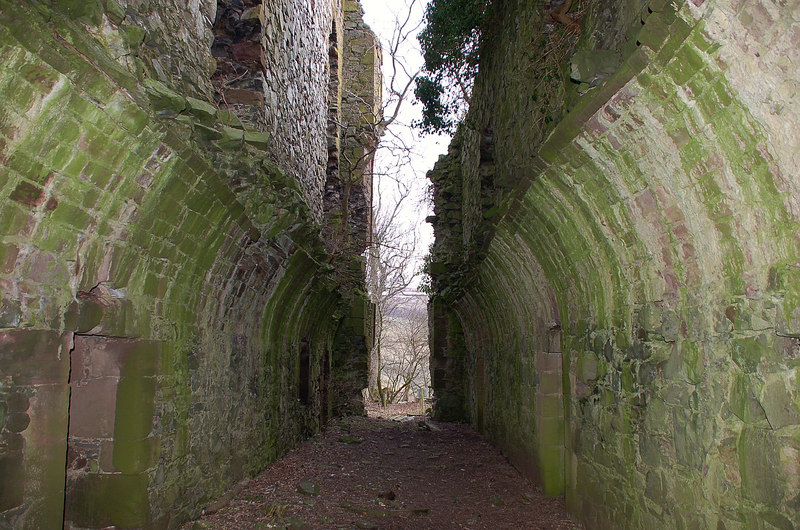
Drochil Castle, basement corridor. The Castle is notable for its planning with central corridors on three levels

James Douglas started building Drochil Castle for his own use in 1578, three years before his death. It was no more than half built and never finished. The ruins of the castle overlook Peebles and the valleys of the Tarth Water, Lyne Water, and River Tweed. At Aberdour Castle in Fife, Morton's lodging survives with its terrace overlooking the Firth of Forth. Morton also extended his residence at Dalkeith Palace, but these works have long since been demolished. Wreaths Tower, Kirkbean Parish, Dumfries and Galloway, is said to have belonged to Morton.

Morton commissioned extensive reconstruction at Edinburgh Castle after the siege, including the Portcullis Gate where his heraldic insignia of a heart can still be seen, and the iconic half-moon battery which fronts the castle and conceals the remains of buildings destroyed in 1573. On his orders, galleries, stables, and other new buildings were constructed at Stirling Castle and Holyroodhouse, and rooms refurbished and furnished for the use of the King. During his resignation in March 1578, Morton pointed out to the officers of the Scottish exchequer that the royal houses were "now in better case than they were at the beginning of his regiment."

== Morton in fiction ==
Morton is a character in Liz Lochhead's play Mary Queen of Scots Got Her Head Chopped Off.

Nigel Tranter's novel Lord and Master (originally called The Master of Gray, the first part of a trilogy of that name) includes an account of Morton's fall from power and his execution.

Morton was played by the actor Bruce Purchase in the 1971 period drama Mary, Queen of Scots.

== See also ==
- Casket letters

== Sources ==
- Hewitt, George R., Scotland under Morton 1572–80, John Donald, Edinburgh (1982, and reprint, 2003)
- Lee, Maurice, 'The Fall of Regent Morton: a problem in Satellite Diplomacy,' in Journal of Modern History, vol. 28 (1956), pp. 111–129
- Sir Herbert Maxwell Bart., FRS, LLD., A History of the House of Douglas 2 vols, Freemantle and Co., London (1902)

Government offices
Preceded by The Earl of Mar	Regent of Scotland; 1572–1578	Last regent
Military offices
Unknown	Lord High Admiral of Scotland; 1567–	Unknown
Political offices
Preceded by The 4th Earl of Huntly	Lord Chancellor of Scotland; 1563–1566	Succeeded by The 5th Earl of Huntly
Preceded by The 5th Earl of Huntly	Lord Chancellor of Scotland; 1567–1573	Succeeded by The 5th Earl of Argyll
Peerage of Scotland
Preceded by James Douglas	Earl of Morton; 1553–1581	Succeeded by Archibald Douglas
