= James Stewart, 1st Earl of Moray =

Regent for King James VI of Scotland from 1567–1570

James Stewart, Earl of Moray
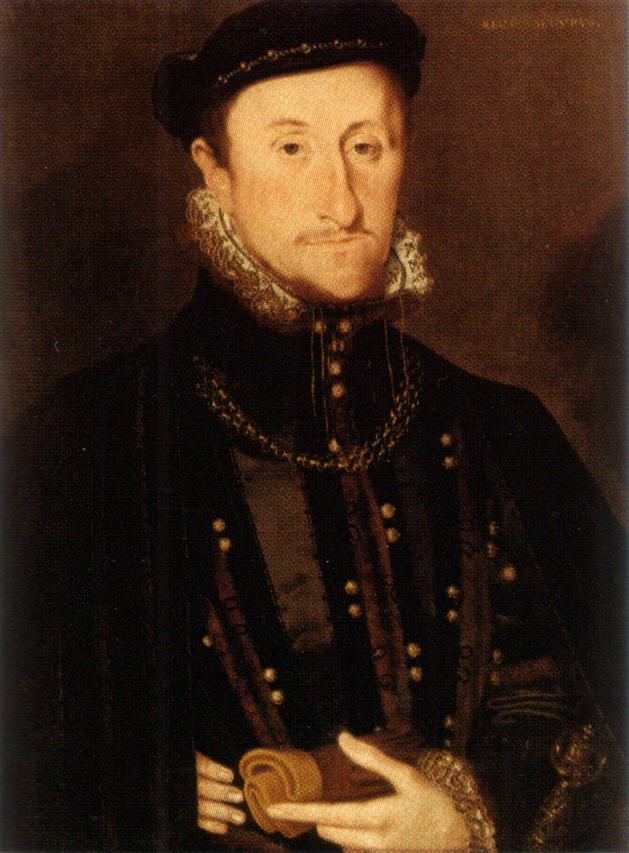
- The Earl of Moray, a detail from a wedding portrait by Hans Eworth

Regent of Scotland
- In office 22 August 1567 – 23 January 1570
- Monarch: James VI
- Preceded by: Mary of Guise
- Succeeded by: Matthew Stewart, 4th Earl of Lennox

Personal details
- Born: c. 1531 Scotland
- Died: 23 January 1570 Linlithgow, Scotland
- Resting place: St. Giles Cathedral, Edinburgh
- Spouse(s): Christina Stewart; Agnes Keith
- Children: Elizabeth Stewart, 2nd Countess of Moray
- Parents: James V of Scotland (father); Margaret Erskine (mother)

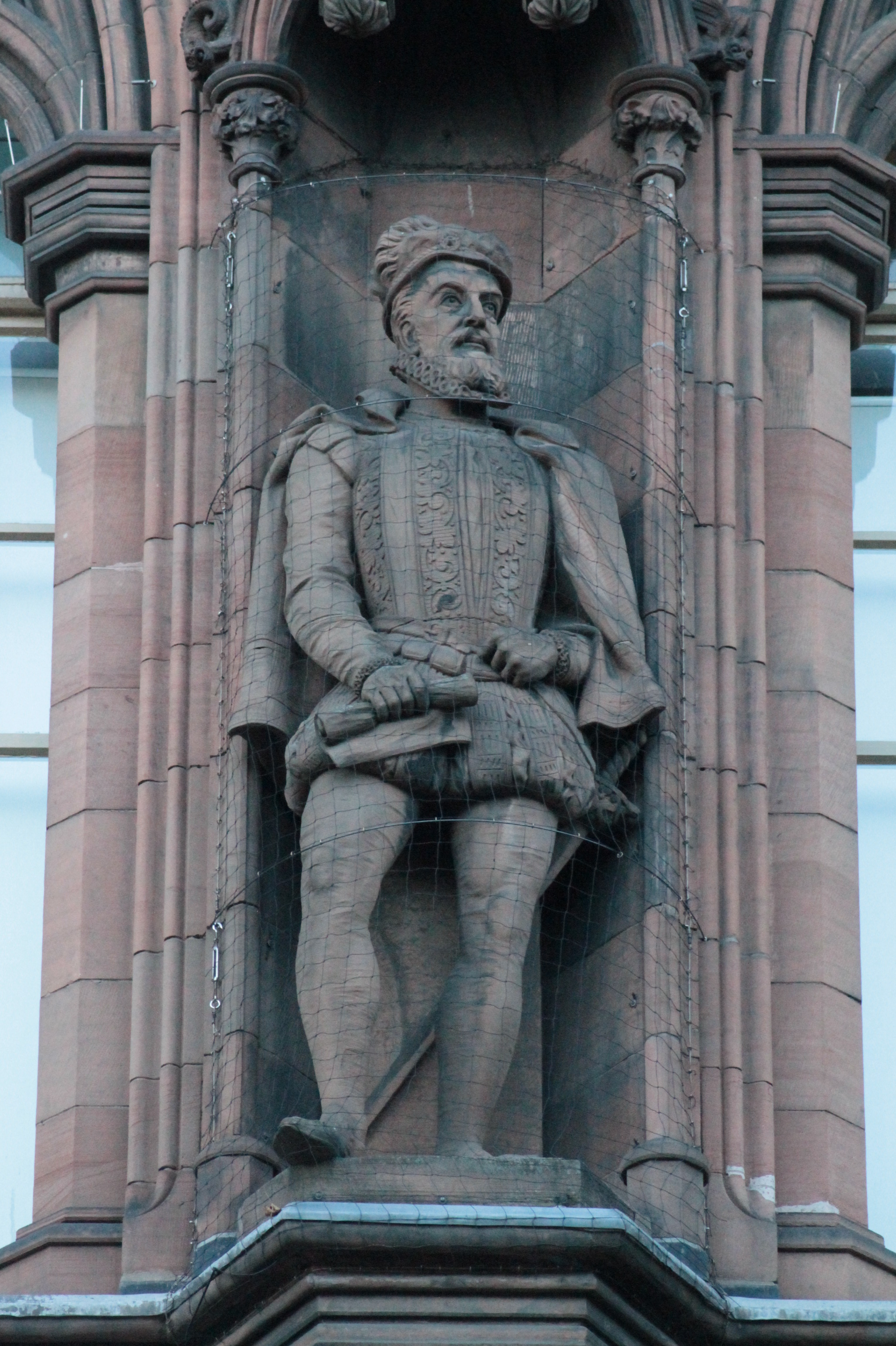
Statue of James Stewart, 1st Earl of Moray, Scottish National Portrait Gallery

James Stewart, 1st Earl of Moray (c. 1531 – 23 January 1570) was a member of the House of Stewart as the illegitimate son of James V of Scotland. At times a supporter of his half-sister Mary, Queen of Scots, he was the regent of Scotland for his half-nephew, the infant James VI, from 1567 until his assassination in 1570. He was the first head of government to be assassinated with a firearm.

== Early life ==
Moray was born in about 1531, an illegitimate child of King James V of Scotland and his mistress Lady Margaret Erskine, daughter of John Erskine, 5th Lord Erskine, and wife of Sir Robert Douglas of Lochleven.

On 31 August 1536, he received a royal charter granting the lands of Tantallon and others. In 1538, following the death of Alexander Stewart, James was appointed Prior of St Andrews, Fife. This position supplied his income. Clothes for "lord James of Sanctandrois" and his brothers were made by the king's tailor, Thomas Arthur.

Lord James and his half-brother James Stewart, Commendator of Kelso and Melrose were at school in St Andrews when James V died in 1542. In June 1543, the Regent Arran sent the Laird of Grange to collect them and take them to Linlithgow Palace. Instead, Robert Douglas took Lord James to Lochleven Castle.

During the war between England and Scotland known as the Rough Wooing, it was suggested Lord James might be recruited as an ally to Edward VI. In October 1548, Thomas Smith wrote to the Duke of Somerset proposing sending a ring or brooch as a token. A letter was sent to him in Edward's name, arguing the French could not be good allies to Scotland. Lord James did not reply.

== Rises in power, advises Queen Mary ==
In May 1553, the imperial ambassador to England, Jean Scheyfve, heard that Mary of Guise planned to make him regent in place of James Hamilton, Duke of Châtellerault. Mary of Guise was the widow of James V and the mother of his only surviving legitimate child, Mary, Queen of Scots, who was living in France at the time and had not yet reached adulthood. Guise herself became regent in 1554.

On 5 August 1557, Lord James Stewart, his half-brother Lord Robert, and Lord Home led a raiding party from Edinburgh towards Ford Castle in Northumberland. They burnt houses at Fenton and in Glendale, before retreating on the approach of an English force led by Henry Percy, 8th Earl of Northumberland.

In 1558, James attended the wedding in Paris of his half-sister Mary, Queen of Scots, to the Dauphin of France, who became King Francis II of France. To fund this trip, his mother obtained credit from Timothy Cagnioli, an Italian banker in Edinburgh.

James became a supporter of the Scottish Reformation. In June 1559, he plucked down the graven images in various churches at Perth. An English commentator praised James for his virtue, manhood, valour and stoutness as a leader of the Protestant Lords of the Congregation.

After the death of her first husband, King Francis of France, Mary planned to return to Scotland. James wrote to her in June 1561 about Bartholomew de Villemore, the French Comptroller of Scotland, who was ordered to repair her palaces and make provision for her household. Despite their religious differences, Moray became one of the chief advisers to his half-sister Mary after her return from France. Although James disturbed her priests celebrating mass at Holyroodhouse in September 1561, she made him Earl of Moray on 30 January 1562, and Earl of Mar on 7 February 1562. The Mar earldom, which appears to have been his wedding present, was soon afterwards withdrawn) With the lucrative Moray earldom came Darnaway Castle with its medieval hall, notable even then as "verie fayer and large builded". Moray also had a smaller house called Pitlethie near Leuchars in Fife, which his father had used.

James wrote to Robert Dudley, 1st Earl of Leicester, a favourite of Queen Elizabeth I of England, in January 1562. In October 1562, Moray defeated a rebellion by George Gordon, 4th Earl of Huntly, at the Battle of Corrichie near Aberdeen. The very powerful and wealthy Huntly, who controlled large areas of northeastern Scotland, died immediately after this battle. In 1562, Alistair Gunn son-in-law of John Gordon, 11th Earl of Sutherland, led Gordon's retinue and encountered James Stewart, 1st Earl of Moray, and his followers on the High Street of Aberdeen. The Earl of Moray was the bastard half-brother of Mary, Queen of Scots, as well as the son-in-law of William Keith, 4th Earl Marischal, chief of Clan Keith. It was the custom at the time to yield thoroughfares to the personage of greater rank, and in refusing to yield the middle of the street to Stewart and his train, Gunn insulted the Earl publicly. Stewart soon afterward had him pursued to a place called Delvines, near Nairn. There he was captured by Andrew Munro of Milntown and taken to Inverness, and following a mock trial, he was executed.

Moray went to Castle Campbell for the wedding of James Stewart, 1st Lord Doune, and Margaret Campbell (d. 1572), sister of the Earl of Argyll, on 10 January 1563. There was a masque involving courtiers and musicians dressed in white taffeta as shepherds. However, Moray became ill and withdrew to Stirling Castle. Mary, Queen of Scots, was also ill for a week.

== Chaseabout Raid ==
Moray opposed the marriage of his half-sister Mary, to Henry Stuart, Lord Darnley, in July 1565, and he embarked upon the unsuccessful Chaseabout Raid, a revolt precipitated by the marriage, together with the Earl of Argyll and Clan Hamilton. He was subsequently declared an outlaw and took refuge in England, where he had an audience with Elizabeth I in the presence of the French ambassadors Paul de Foix and Michel de Castelnau. She disapproved of his action against a lawful monarch.

It was said that David Rizzio was involved in brokering pardons at Holyrood for Moray and the rebels, which aroused the jealousy of Lord Darnley. Moray returned to Scotland after the murder of Rizzio, pardoned by the Queen, and once more became one of her key advisers. On 31 August 1566, Moray wrote from Stirling Castle to the treasurer Robert Richardson to ensure Nichola Wardlaw, one of the queen's gentlewomen, received a velvet gown for her wedding day. He contrived nonetheless to be away at the time of Darnley's assassination in 1567. He avoided the entanglements of Mary's disastrous marriage to James Hepburn, 4th Earl of Bothwell, which followed the Darnley murder by mere weeks, by removing himself to France.

== The Gude Regent ==
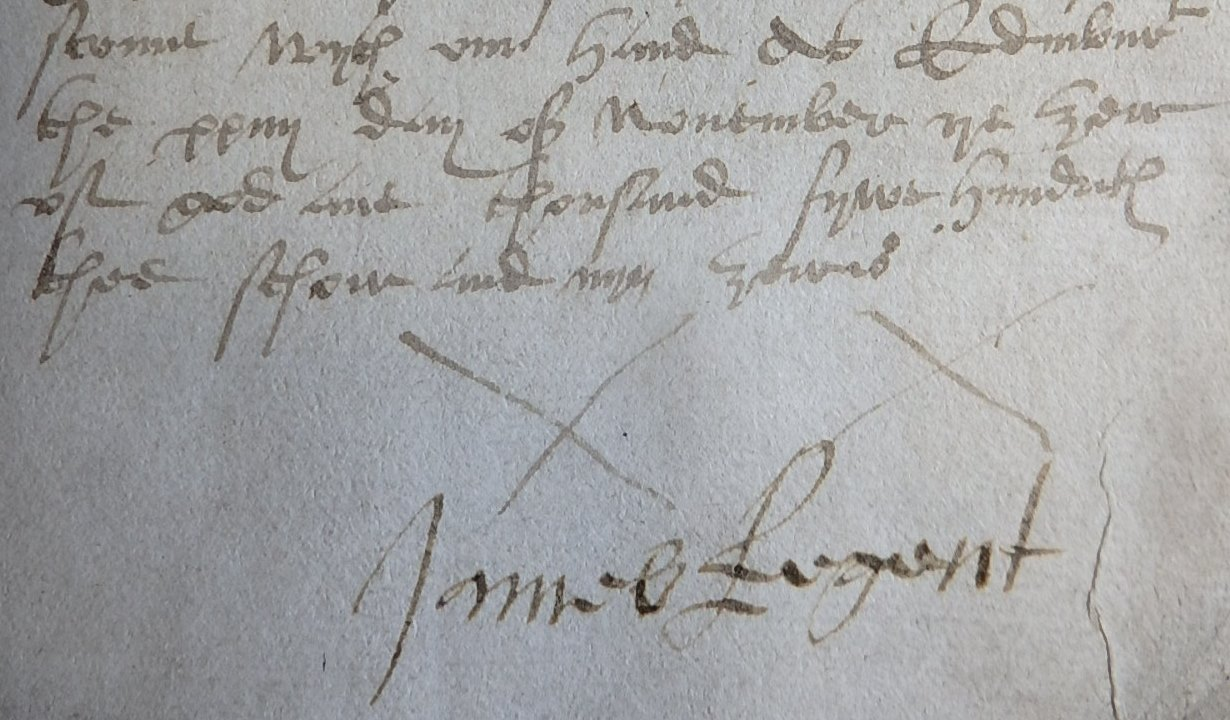
Signature of James Stewart, as Regent Moray, (National Records of Scotland)

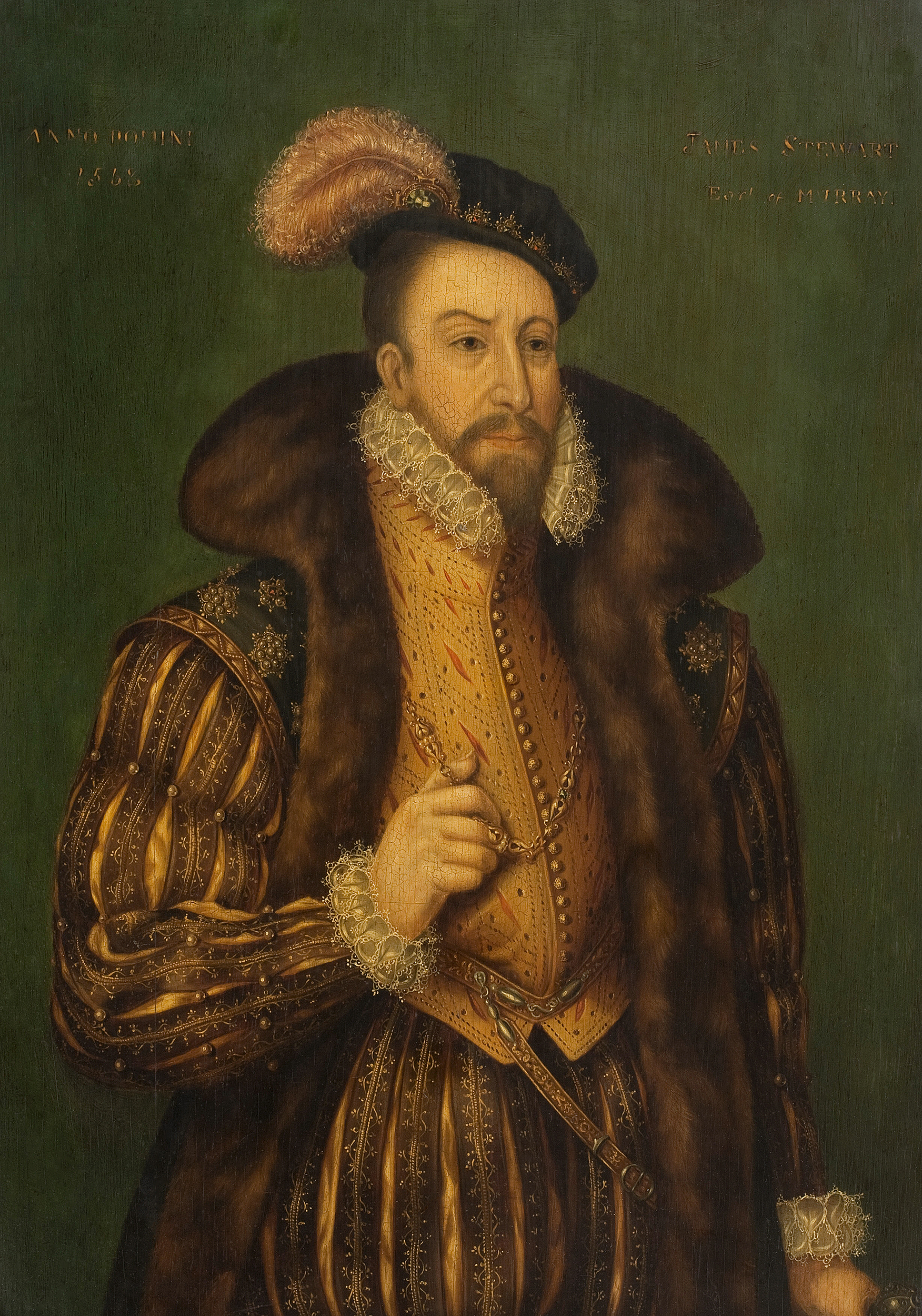
James Stewart (c. 1531–1570), 1st Earl of Moray (1562), Regent of Scotland (1567–1570), 1568

Mary was forced to abdicate at Lochleven Castle on 24 July 1567. Moray returned to Edinburgh from France on 11 August 1567 by way of Berwick-upon-Tweed. William Cecil, the English Secretary of State, had arranged his transport from Dieppe in an English ship. He was appointed regent on 22 August for the infant King James VI. There was a public ceremony or inauguration in Edinburgh, Moray took an oath before the Justice Clerk John Bellenden at the Tolbooth and was proclaimed by heralds at the Mercat Cross.

The appointment was confirmed by Parliament in December. To raise money, Moray sent his agent Nicolas Elphinstone to London to sell Mary's jewels and pearls. Moray bought clothes for his lackeys and an African servant called Nageir the Moor in February 1568.

Mary escaped from Loch Leven on 2 May 1568, and the Duke of Châtellerault and other nobles rallied to her standard. Moray gathered his allies and defeated her forces at the Battle of Langside, near Glasgow, on 13 May 1568. Mary was compelled to flee and decided to seek refuge in England. She could have departed for France if she had liked, where she retained the status of queen dowager; however, this would have taken more time and resources to arrange.

For the subsequent management of the kingdom without Mary as queen, he secured both civil and ecclesiastical peace and earned the title of "The Gude Regent". In August 1568, it was reported that Moray refused a letter from Mary's supporter Lord Herries that was addressed simply to the "Earl of Moray" without his new title of Regent of Scotland.

=== York conference ===
In September 1568, Moray chose commissioners and travelled to York to discuss a treaty with England. Moray had a list of allegations against Mary compiled, known as the Book of Articles, which he sent to Cecil. During this conference, he produced the Casket letters, which were supposed to incriminate Queen Mary and justify his rule in Scotland. It was later said that a plan by a group of English supporters of Mary to assassinate him at Northallerton, Yorkshire, on his way back had been called off.

=== Military activities ===
Scotland was now in a state of civil war. Moray moved against the supporters of Queen Mary in their south-west homelands with a military expedition in June 1568 called the 'Raid of Dumfries' or 'Raid of Hoddom'. The Regent's army and the royal artillery were taken to Biggar, where his allies were commanded to muster on 10 June and proceed on to Dumfries. The army was protected by a scouting party led by Alexander Hume of Manderston, and the vanguard was commanded by the Earl of Morton and Lord Home. Behind was the 'carriage' (the artillery train), followed by Moray himself. The Laird of Cessford followed behind, and the army was flanked by the scouting parties of the Lairds of Merse and Buccleuch.

Along the way, Moray captured houses belonging to supporters of Queen Mary, including Lord Fleming's Boghall, Skirling, Crawford, Sanquhar, Kenmure and Hoddom, where the cannon were deployed, and Annan, where he rendezvoused with the English nobleman Lord Scrope (the Captain of Carlisle Castle), to discuss border matters. Scrope estimated the army to number 6,000 men and returned to Carlisle, where he saw Queen Mary's servants play football on 14 June. Moray then took Lochmaben Castle, which the Laird of Drumlanrig was left to hold, and then captured Lochwood and Lochhouse before returning to Edinburgh via Peebles. At Dumfries, a number of Lord Maxwell's supporters surrendered. Moray was responsible for the destruction of Rutherglen castle, which he burned to the ground in 1569 in retribution against the Hamiltons for having supported Mary at the Battle of Langside.

In June 1569, Moray went north to Brechin, where he accepted hostages sent by George Gordon, 5th Earl of Huntly. At Dunnotar Castle, he proclaimed that he had "reparit (arrived) in proper person (as Regent) to thir north partis of firm purpose and deliberation to reduce sic as hes neglectit their duty in time bypast ... intending to use lenitie (leniency) and moderation."

At Aberdeen, Moray held talks with Huntly himself. At Inverness, on 4 June 1569, Moray met the Highland and Island chiefs with the Earls of Caithness and Sutherland and Lord Lovat. His secretary, John Wood, said "such a power had seldom been seen there," Moray wrote that "the journey is to put down troubles in the north."

In March 1569 Moray came from Kelso to Liddesdale and spoke to the English border warden, Sir John Forster. He was accompanied by Lord Home, Ker of Cessford, Ker of Ferniehirst, Scot of Buccleuch and 4,000 men. After holding unsatisfactory talks with the local leaders, "the best of the surname men", Moray burned the farmsteads in Liddesdale. He stayed at Mangerton, then had the house blown up with gunpowder and returned to Jedburgh.

== Marriages and issue ==
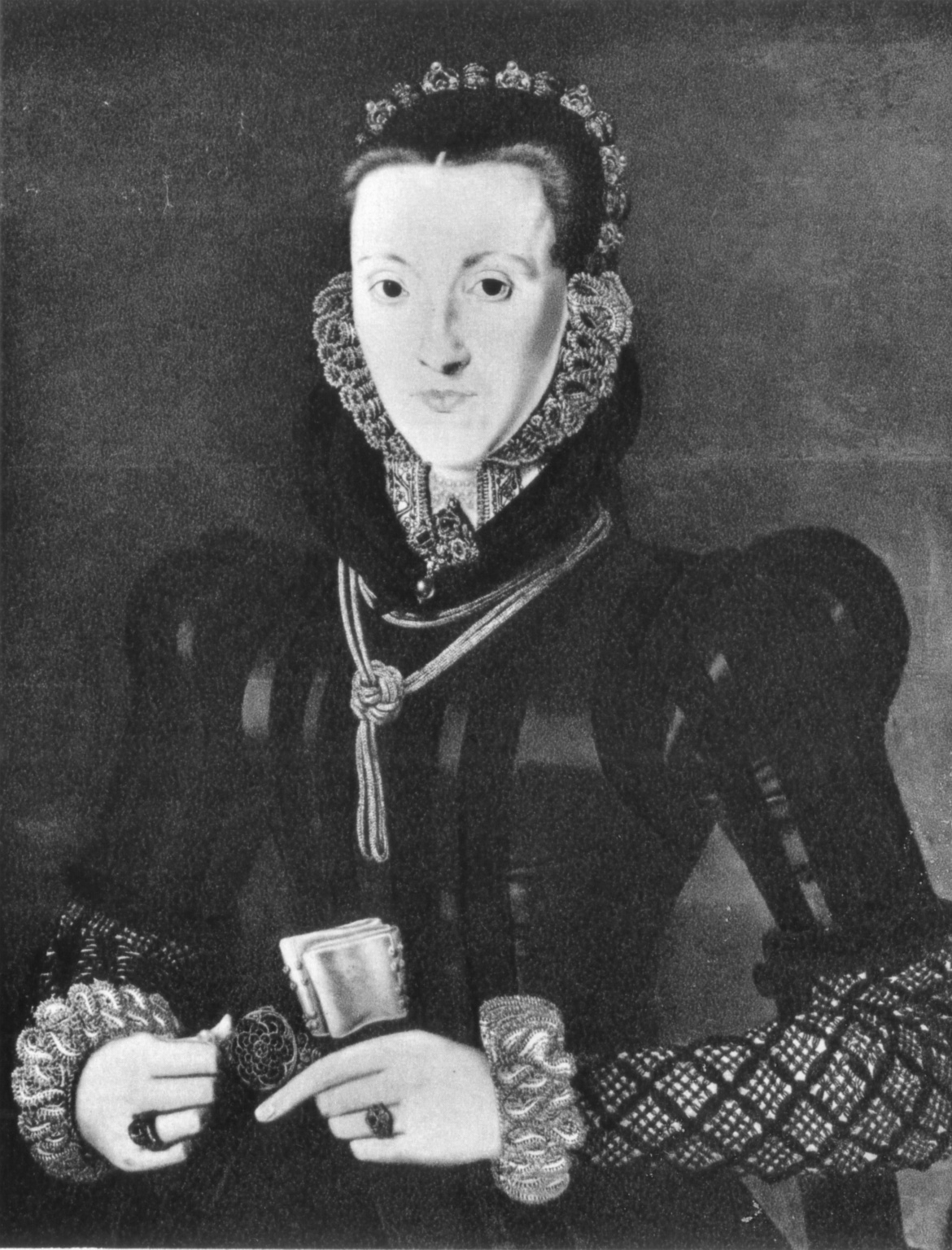
Agnes, Countess of Moray, by Hans Eworth

- Christina Stewart, 4th Countess of Buchan (c. 1548 – 20 September 1580), In January 1549/1550, though Christina was only a young child, a contract of marriage was arranged between her and James Stewart, afterwards Earl of Moray and Regent, which would give him possession of her lands;
- Agnes Keith (c. 1540 – 16 July 1588), on 8 February 1562 at St Giles Cathedral in Edinburgh. daughter of William Keith, 4th Earl Marischal The marriage ceremony had most Scottish nobility present who afterwards attended a huge reception at Holyrood Palace. The marriage produced three daughters:
  - Elizabeth Stuart, 2nd Countess of Moray (August 1565 – 18 November 1591), married James Stewart, 2nd Earl of Moray, on 23 January 1581;
  - Lady Annabel Stuart (? – before 1572);
  - Lady Margaret Stuart (8 April 1569 – 1586), contract for the marriage signed on 27 June 1584 with Francis Hay, 9th Earl of Erroll, without issue.

== Assassination ==
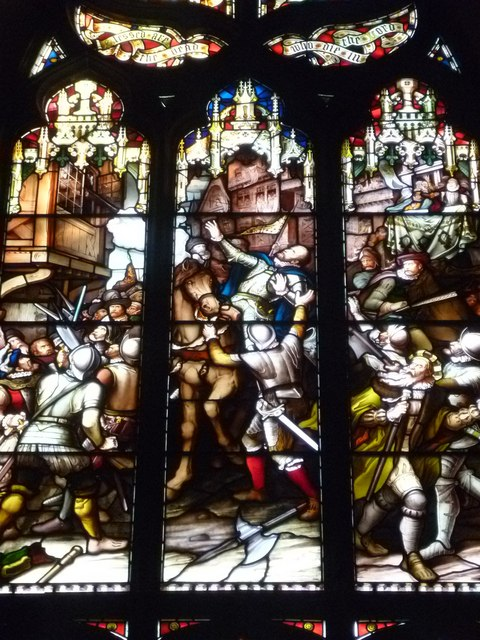
Assassination of the Regent Moray. Victorian stained-glass window in St Giles' Kirk, Edinburgh

On Thursday 19 January 1570, Moray was at Stirling Castle, where he had invited the English diplomat Sir Henry Gates and the soldier Sir William Drury, Marshal of Berwick, for dinner in the Great Hall. Later, in his bedchamber, he told the English visitors he would meet them and certain Scottish nobles at Edinburgh on Monday or Tuesday to discuss the rendition of English rebels. Moray was troubled by the problem of Dumbarton Castle, which was held against him by supporters of Mary, Queen of Scots. On 21 January, he sent letters to summon the Earl of Morton, Lindsay and Home to the meeting in Edinburgh.

Moray was assassinated in Linlithgow on 23 January 1570 by James Hamilton of Bothwellhaugh, a supporter of his half-sister Mary. As Moray was passing in a cavalcade in the main street below, Hamilton fatally wounded him with a matchlock carbine shot from a window of his uncle Archbishop Hamilton's house. He was the first head of government to be assassinated by a firearm.

Moray's body was shipped to Leith, then taken to Holyrood Abbey. Moray was buried on 14 February 1570 in St Anthony's aisle at St Giles' Cathedral, Edinburgh. Seven earls and lords carried his body; William Kirkcaldy of Grange held his standard, and John Knox preached at the funeral. Knox's own prohibition of funeral sermons (on the grounds that they glorified the deceased and displayed distinctions between rich and poor) was waived for the occasion. Moray's tomb was carved by John Roytell and Murdoch Walker, with a brass engraved by James Gray. The contract for the tomb survives. It was written by the chaplain Robert Ewyn, the administrator of the craft of masons and wrights in Edinburgh.

His wife, Agnes Keith, was buried inside his tomb when she died in 1588.

Moray was succeeded by his eldest daughter and heir, Elizabeth Stewart, 2nd Countess of Moray, whose husband, James Stewart of Doune, acquired the earldom on their marriage.

== Cultural depictions ==
A stained-glass window installed in St. Giles' Cathedral, Edinburgh in the 1880s depicts Moray's assassination and John Knox preaching at his funeral. There is a bas-relief sculpture by Amelia Hill in Linlithgow commemorating the assassination and a Regent Moray Street near the Kelvin Hall in Glasgow.

A chronicle history of Scotland, the Historie of the reigne of Marie Queen of Scots compiled by Lord Herries, includes an unfavourable summary of Moray's career, outlining his part in the troubles of Mary, Queen of Scots.

The Earl of Moray is depicted in many fictional works which focus on the life and times of Mary, Queen of Scots. These include the following:

- Sir Walter Scott's 1820 novel The Monastery, identified as the Earl of Murray;
- The 1923 film The Loves of Mary, Queen of Scots, portrayed by Lionel d'Aragon;
- The 1936 film Mary of Scotland, portrayed by Ian Keith;
- The 1940 film Das Herz der Königin, portrayed by Walther Suessenguth;
- The 1971 film Mary, Queen of Scots, portrayed by Patrick McGoohan;
- Thea Musgrave's 1977 opera Mary, Queen of Scots;
- The 2013–2017 television series Reign, portrayed by Dan Jeannotte;
- The 2018 film Mary Queen of Scots, portrayed by James McArdle.

Peerage of Scotland
New creation	Earl of Moray; 1562–1570	Succeeded by Elizabeth Stewart
