= Andrew Beaton =

Scottish royal courtier (died 1577)

Andrew Beaton (died 1577) was a Scottish courtier, and Master of the Household to Mary, Queen of Scots in England.

== Family background ==
He was a son of James Beaton of Balfarg and Helen Melville. One of his brothers, James Beaton, was Archbishop of Glasgow, who became an important ally of Mary, Queen of Scots, after she was deposed in Scotland.

== Career ==
In 1565 Andrew Beaton carried letters from Charles IX of France and Catherine de' Medici to Mary, Queen of Scots and Lord Darnley. He delivered a letter from Mary to Elizabeth I. An English diplomat, John Tamworth, was sent to Scotland for clarification. On Beaton's return, Mary attempted to bolster confidence in her rule by claiming Elizabeth would not meddle in the quarrel between her and her lords. At the beginning of the Chaseabout Raid she sent him to Elizabeth I and back to France.

In 1572 Beaton, followed another brother John Beaton in becoming Master of Mary's household in England, in charge of her servants and household expenses.

He hoped to marry Mary Seton, one of the queen's companions. She had made a vow of celibacy, so Beaton travelled to obtain a dispensation. Mary wrote to him from Sheffield Castle on 22 August 1577, with political news, instructions, and a reminder to get her some novelties from the shops in Paris.

Beaton had an audience with Elizabeth I in London.

He died in France in 1577.

His replacement as Master of the Queen's Household was Andrew Melville of Garvock, who married Jane Kennedy.
