= Mary Seton =

Scottish courtier and later a nun

- Born: 1542; Scotland
- Died: 1615 (aged 72–73); Reims, France
- Known for: Lady in waiting to Mary, Queen of Scots
- Parent(s): George Seton, 6th Lord Seton; Marie Pieris

Mary Seton (1542–1615) was a Scottish courtier and later a nun. She was one of the four attendants of Mary, Queen of Scots, known as the Four Marys. She was a sister at the Convent of Saint Pierre les Dames in Reims at the time of her death.

== Sent to France ==
Mary Seton was the daughter of George Seton, 6th Lord Seton, and his second wife Marie Pieris or Pierres, a daughter of René Pierres, of Plessis Baudouin, and Antoinette d'Hommes. Marie Pierres was a lady-in-waiting to Mary of Guise, the wife of King James V of Scotland. The French Pierres family claimed to have descended from the Percy family of Northumberland.

As a child, Mary Seton became a lady-in-waiting to the young Mary, Queen of Scots, along with three other girls of similar age and of a similar standing in Scots society. They were famously known as "The Four Marys": she and Mary Beaton, Mary Fleming and Mary Livingston. The Four Marys accompanied Queen Mary in France, where she later married the Dauphin, Francis II of France. Mary Seton was the only one of the four not to marry, and continued in service with Mary, in Scotland and during her captivity in England.

== Scotland again ==
When Queen Mary returned to Scotland, after her ceremonial entry at Edinburgh in September 1561, she went to Linlithgow Palace, while the four Marys, accompanied by the Queen's uncle, the Grand Prior of Malta, François de Lorraine (1534-1563), went to the house of Mary Seton's brother George Seton, 7th Lord Seton, Seton Palace, for dinner.

After their defeat by the Confederate lords at the battle of Carberry Hill on 15 June 1567, Mary Seton accompanied the captive queen back to Edinburgh. Seton assisted the queen's escape from the island fortress of Lochleven Castle by standing at a window dressed in the queen's clothes while she fled to the mainland in a small boat. The Queen came to England following the battle of Langside.

== In England ==
After the Queen's escape, Mary Seton was allowed to leave Lochleven and joined Mary's household in England. Her role and talent as the Queen's hairdresser were described in detail by Sir Francis Knollys, Queen Mary's keeper at Carlisle Castle, in his letter to William Cecil of 28 June 1568. Mary had told Knollys that Mary Seton was the finest 'busker' of a woman's head and hair in any country. Knollys wrote that;

"Yesterday, and this daye she dyd sett sotche a curled heare uppon the Queen, that was said to be a perewyke that showed very delycately: and every other day lightly ... (word lost) she hathe a newe devyce of head dressyng, withowte any coste, and yett setteth forthe a woman gaylye well."

At first Mary Seton was given a room to herself with two beds, one for her maid or 'gentlewoman' Janet Spittell. She also had a manservant called John Dumfries. In March 1569 the Earl of Shrewsbury noted that Queen Mary would sit and sew in his wife Bess of Hardwick's chamber at Tutbury Castle accompanied by Mary Seton and Lady Livingston. Mary Seton formed a relationship with Christopher Norton, and seems to have plotted for Mary's escape. Norton was executed for his part in the Northern Rebellion.

In August 1570, Mary's mother, Mary Pieris, Lady Seton, who was at Blair Castle with the Countess of Atholl, heard her daughter was ill, and wrote from Dunkeld to Queen Mary to ask if she could come home. The messenger carrying the letters, John Moon, was captured, and Mary Pieris was imprisoned in Edinburgh, for writing to the exiled queen. In October, Queen Elizabeth heard that Mary Pieris had been arrested and would be banished from Scotland for writing to her daughter and Queen Mary, and took action that Regent Lennox should be advised that she thought it no great cause. Pieris had already been released, before Elizabeth's intervention, promising not to write to Queen Mary again.

When Queen Mary was moved to Sheffield Castle in September 1571, Mary Seton stayed in attendance, but her servant John Dumfries was excluded and kept in the town. Janet Spittle was sent back to Scotland. Mary Seton then had an older woman as her servant, Janet Lindsay, and as they were tired of each other by April 1577, she was allowed back to Scotland.

One of her brothers visited the French ambassador in London, Michel de Castelnau, in May or June 1581. A plan for Mary Seton to visit her family was put on hold. Margaret Livingstone, Countess of Orkney would have taken Seton's place with Mary, but instead Livingstone was getting married.

At Sheffield in November 1581, Robert Beale questioned Mary Seton about Queen Mary's recent illness, which had a quick onset. Seton said that she had not seen the Queen as ill before, her side gave her evil pains especially in the thigh and leg. The Queen lacked appetite, was losing sleep, and in Seton's opinion could not long continue. The master of Mary's household in England, Andrew Beaton, wished to marry Mary Seton, but as she had made a vow of celibacy, Andrew travelled to Paris to obtain a dispensation. He died during his return journey.

== The Convent of Saint-Pierre in Reims ==
Sometime around 1585 she retired from the Scottish Queen's household in England to the Convent of Saint-Pierre at Reims in France where the abbess was Renée de Guise, the sister of Mary of Guise and aunt of Mary, Queen of Scots. Mary wrote a letter to Mary, Countess of Shrewsbury, on 22 February 1608, mentioning that her right arm was paralysed, and the letter was in French because she had forgotten the little English she knew after twenty years, as a 'poor recluse in a monastery.' She wrote that she had sent other letters to the Countess and Lady Arbella Stuart. She wrote to the Countess of Roxburghe, a companion of Anne of Denmark, in September 1614. Mary Seton died at the Convent in 1615.

Little else is known about her last years at Saint Pierre les Dames other than what was written by James Maitland, the expatriate Catholic son of William Maitland of Lethington. Maitland visited the convent and found Seton to be living in poverty and suffering from failing health. He complained to her family, to whom he was remotely related, and to Queen Mary's son James VI of Scotland, but there is no evidence of a response. The bequests in her will show that she was wealthy.

== In popular culture ==
Mary Seton was used as a character in a 16th-century Scottish ballad, “Mary Hamilton”, about a lady-in-waiting who is facing execution for having had a child with the King and killing the child.

The narrator of A Room of One's Own (1929) refers to themself early on in this way: "Here then was I (call me Mary Beton [sic], Mary Seton, Mary Carmichael or by any name you please—it is not a matter of any importance)".

In the 2013-17 CW television series Reign, the character Lady Aylee, played by Jenessa Grant, was loosely based on Mary Seton.

In the 2018 film Mary, Queen of Scots, Mary Seton is played by actress Izuka Hoyle.

In the 2024 novel The Tower by Flora Carr, Lady Mary Seton is a pivotal character. In this historical fiction exploring the imprisonment and escape of Mary, Queen of Scots at Lochleven Castle, Lady Seton's inner thoughts are explored and imagined in vivid detail by the author.
