= Joseph Warner (surgeon) =

British surgeon (1717–1801)

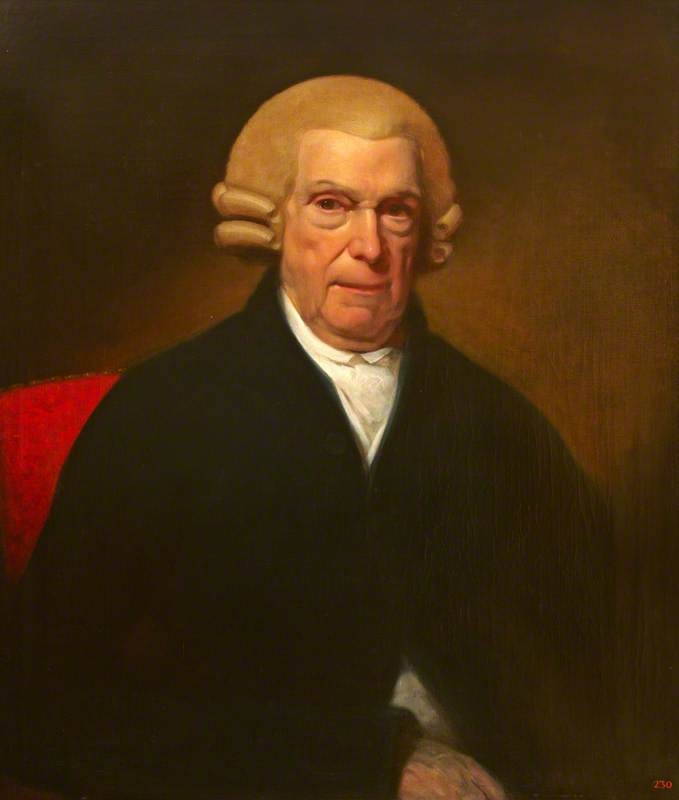
Joseph Warner

Joseph Warner (1717–1801) was a British surgeon and plantation owner in Dominica. He was the first to tie the common carotid artery, an operation he performed in 1775.

== Life ==
He was the eldest son of Ashton Warner (1691–1752) of Antigua. He was sent to England young, and was educated for six or seven years at Westminster School.

Warner was apprenticed for seven years to Samuel Sharp, surgeon to Guy's Hospital, on 3 December 1734. He passed his examination for the great diploma of the Barber-Surgeons' Company on 1 December 1741; and on 2 March 1742 he paid the fee of £10 and took the livery of the company.

At this period Warner was acting with Sharp as joint lecturer on anatomy at Guy's Hospital. He volunteered to accompany the Duke of Cumberland in suppressing the 1745 Jacobite rebellion; and he was elected surgeon to Guy's Hospital, in succession to Pierce, on 22 February 1746, a post he resigned on 30 June 1780. He was elected a Fellow of the Royal Society on 6 December 1750, and on 5 April 1764 he was chosen a member of the court of assistants of the Corporation of Surgeons. He became a member of its court of examiners on 6 August 1771, and he served as its master in 1780 and in 1784.

When the Royal College of Surgeons was created in 1800 Warner became its first member. He was one of very few surgeons who had belonged to each of the three English corporate bodies of surgeons: Barber-Surgeons' Company, Corporation of Surgeons and Royal College.

Warner died at his house in Hatton Street, London on 24 July 1801. With William Bromfeild, Sir Cæsar Hawkins and Sharp he made up the group dominating civil surgical practice in London, and with whom John Hunter had to compete. A dispute with Hunter led Warner to write an account of teaching at Guy's.

== Works ==
Warner's writings on surgery were of their time. His major work was Cases on Surgery … to which is added an Account of the Preparation and Effects of the Agaric of the Oak in Stopping of Bleedings after some of the most capital Operations, London, 1754; 2nd edit. 1754, 3rd edit. 1760, 4th edit. 1784; translated into French, Paris, 1757. It was a concise, wide-ranging survey. He wrote also:

- A Description of the Human Eye and its adjacent parts, together with their Principal Diseases, London, 1773; 2nd edit. 1775.
- An Account of the Testicles … and the Diseases to which they are liable, London, 1774; 2nd edit. 1775; translated into German, Gotha, 1775.

== Family ==
Warner married Elizabeth Saunders. William Warner of Dominica (died 1793) was their son; and Joseph Warner of St Vincent (1756–1833) has been identified tentatively as their second son.

Warner had brothers including William Warner of Antigua (died 1771), the merchant Edward Warner of Austin Friars (died 1772), Daniel Warner and Samuel Henry Warner.
