= John Beaton (courtier) =

John Beaton (1538–1570) was a Scottish courtier who served as a Master of Household to Mary, Queen of Scots.

== Family background ==
He was a son of John (or James) Beaton of Auchmuty (Auchmowteis) and Balfarg in Fife, and a brother of James Beaton, Archbishop of Glasgow. His mother was Helen Melville of Drummaird (near Kennoway).

James Beaton studied law, and, according to his epitaph, joined Queen Mary's service as a taster of her food.

In 1569, John Beaton arranged the marriage of his sister Jonet Beaton (died 1579) to Robert Lundy of Conland near Glenrothes, a son of the laird of Balgonie, She married secondly Captain David Wemyss of Dron.

== Battle of Carberry Hill ==
In 1567, Beaton rode from Edinburgh with Robert Anstruther, Captain of Inchkeith, an officer of the Gardes Écossaises, to join Mary and Bothwell at Dunbar Castle. He wrote a letter describing how Queen Mary was besieged at Borthwick Castle and then captured at the battle of Carberry Hill. The letter was at first attributed by historians to a "James Beaton". John Beaton had a cousin, John Beaton of Balfour (died 1579), who was married to Robert Anstruther's sister Agnes Anstruther.

== Mary's escape ==
In May 1568 when Mary escaped from Lochleven Castle, Beaton waited on the shore of Loch Leven with George Douglas of Helenhill. Beaton carried news of the escape to England and France. According to Claude Nau, he gave Mary's token of a ring with a diamond shaped like a rock to Elizabeth I. Elizabeth instructed her ambassador Henry Norris to ask Charles IX of France to refrain from sending soldiers to Scotland. Beaton's narrative of events was recorded by Petrucci, the Florentine ambassador in Paris. Beaton asked for money and troops, but Mary had already been defeated at the battle of Langside.

== England ==
John Beaton served Mary during her captivity in England, and also carried her letters to France. According to the Spanish ambassador Guerau de Espés, William Cecil met him and asked if he had any dealings with Spain.

At Wingfield Manor, Beaton witnessed a document which Mary hoped would obtain her divorce from Bothwell. He was involved in a plan to free Mary from Chatsworth in 1569. He spoke to a man called John Hall, advising him of difficulties, and that Mary did not want to escape and trusted she would be soon be freed by Elizabeth I.

Beaton died at Chatsworth in October 1570 and was buried at St Peter's Church, Edensor, where there is an inscription on a brass plate, which mentions that he helped Mary escape from Lochleven in 1568. The brass was commissioned in Paris by his brothers. His brother Andrew Beaton also served as Mary as Master of Household.
