= Michael Gilbert (goldsmith) =

Edinburgh goldsmith (died 1590)

- Died: 24 September 1590
- Occupations: Goldsmither, financier

Michael Gilbert (died 1590) was an Edinburgh goldsmith and financier, and master goldsmith to Mary, Queen of Scots and Lord Darnley.

== Career ==
His brothers John Gilbert senior and Alexander Gilbert, and nephew David Gilbert (a son of John Gilbert) were also goldsmiths. John Gilbert served as "counter warden" of the Scottish mint from May 1554. An earlier "Michael Gilbert" was a goldsmith, so he is often listed as "Michael II Gilbert".

At the Scottish Reformation in 1559, Gilbert was given two small silver chandeliers from the treasury of St Giles' Kirk for safekeeping. In 1560 he bought silver from the church and the diamond from a ring on the finger of the arm relic of St Giles.

George Seton, 7th Lord Seton is thought to have commissioned dies from Gilbert to strike gold and silver medals with the motto "UN DIEU, UN FOY, UN ROY, UN LOY", and a monogram with his initials and those of his wife, Isobel Hamilton, daughter of William Hamilton of Sanquhar, "GS-IH," with another motto "Nemo Potest Duobus Dominus Servire," from Matthew 6:24, "No one can serve two masters". In 1570 Lord Seton owed Gilbert for a dozen silver trenchers, three silver cups, and a dozen silver spoons.

By May 1566, Gilbert was appointed as the master goldsmith to Mary, Queen of Scots and Lord Darnley, and he was exempted from any military service that would take him away from his royal duties.

On 11 June 1567, the Provost of Edinburgh, Simon Preston, sent Edward Littil, William Foular, and Gilbert to Dunbar Castle, where Mary was with Bothwell, with the burgh council's excuse and reasons for receiving their political opponents, the Confederate Lords. In July, Gilbert, Nicol Edward, and Robert Abercromby were sent as Edinburgh's commissioners to the coronation of James VI at Stirling.

Gilbert sold rings and other jewels to Regent Moray and his wife Agnes Keith. These included in March 1568; two diamond rings and two ruby rings, a gold chain with a "tablet" or locket, and a laver or jug of Paris silver.

He went to London with the merchant William Fowler in May 1571, bringing letters from Mary, Queen of Scots to John Lesley, Bishop of Ross. Gilbert offered rings and "tablets" or lockets of French manufacture to Lesley in July. He offered to exchange money in Edinburgh for Lesley, working with his "good sone" or son-in-law, Nicol Edward. During the "lang siege" of Edinburgh Castle of the Marian Civil War, Gilbert's house in Edinburgh was demolished by the supporters of Mary, Queen of Scots in February 1572 along with Uddert's, Robert Gourlay's, and a house belonging to James MacGill.

Regent Morton bought a gold tablet from him for £22 Scots to give to Sir Thomas Musgrave, Captain of Bewcastle. In 1575 Gilbert and George Heriot petitioned Morton against Edward Hart who claimed he should be a master goldsmith despite not meeting the criteria. Morton was persuaded to support the "liberty" of the craft incorporation, and soon after Hart accepted that he should make a "masterpiece" in the workshop of Heriot or William Cok. Hart was made a master of the goldsmith craft on 22 December 1575.

He was made Deacon of the goldsmiths in June 1576 but refused the appointment. In 1579 he was one of the burgesses appointed to carry the "paill" or canopy at the Entry of James VI into Edinburgh. On that occasion James VI was given a cupboard of silver gilt plate. Gilbert advised a committee on this gift, but the silver was made by other goldsmiths including Edward Hart, Thomas Annand, George Heriot, Adam Craig and William Cok or Cokky.

James Stewart, Earl of Arran made the town of Edinburgh watch nightly for his enemies in 1585. He came in April to check and found Michael Gilbert and his wife in the street. Gilbert said he had sent a substitute or deputy. Arran became angry with this and chased him to his house, beating him with his baton. The town closed its gates against Arran for a time after this.

In June 1586 the Earl of Bothwell and his wife Margaret Douglas sold him rights to the crops of the lands of Traprain and Hailes. In 1588 a hoard of counterfeit hardhead two pence pieces were found buried in the cellar of house belonging to him in Leith.

The goldsmith and financier Thomas Foulis was one of his apprentices. Gilbert and Foulis provided New Year's day gifts to the king in January 1589. His nephew David Gilbert was commissioned by William Fairlie to remodel a jewel presented to Anne of Denmark during her Entry to Edinburgh.

Michael Gilbert died on 24 September 1590.

== Marriages and family ==
He married Sibilla Wycht (d. 1584). They acquired property at Ravelston from John Simpson and Kathrene Murehead in 1563. Their children included:

- Nicolas or Nicoll Gilbert (d. 1609), their second son. He married Christian Hepburn, parents of Eliazer, John and Sibilla Gilbert
- Thomas Gilbert of Kaimes (d. 1596), who married Christian Henderson, in 1596 their daughter Sibilla Gilbert married George Foulis of Woodhall Ravelston (1659-1633), a goldsmith. After the death of Sibilla Gilbert, in 1603 George Foulis married Janet Bannatyne (b. 1587), daughter of George Bannatyne compiler of the Bannatyne Manuscript and Isobel Mauchane (d. 1603).
- Alexander Gilbert, who married Barbara Wardlaw, their daughter Jonet Gilbert was married to the Flemish goldsmith Abraham Vanson
- Lilias Gilbert, who married (1) Alexander Mauchane, and (2) John Preston of Fentonbarns
- Jonet Gilbert, who married Nicol Uddert
- Marion Gilbert, who married (1) Thomas Bannatyne of Newtyle (1540-1591), elder brother of George Bannatyne, and (2) Thomas Bellenden, tutor of Kilconquhar, a son of John Bellenden of Auchnole and Broughton.

His second wife was Issobell Young, who survived him.
