= The Somerset Masque =

1613 play by Thomas Campion

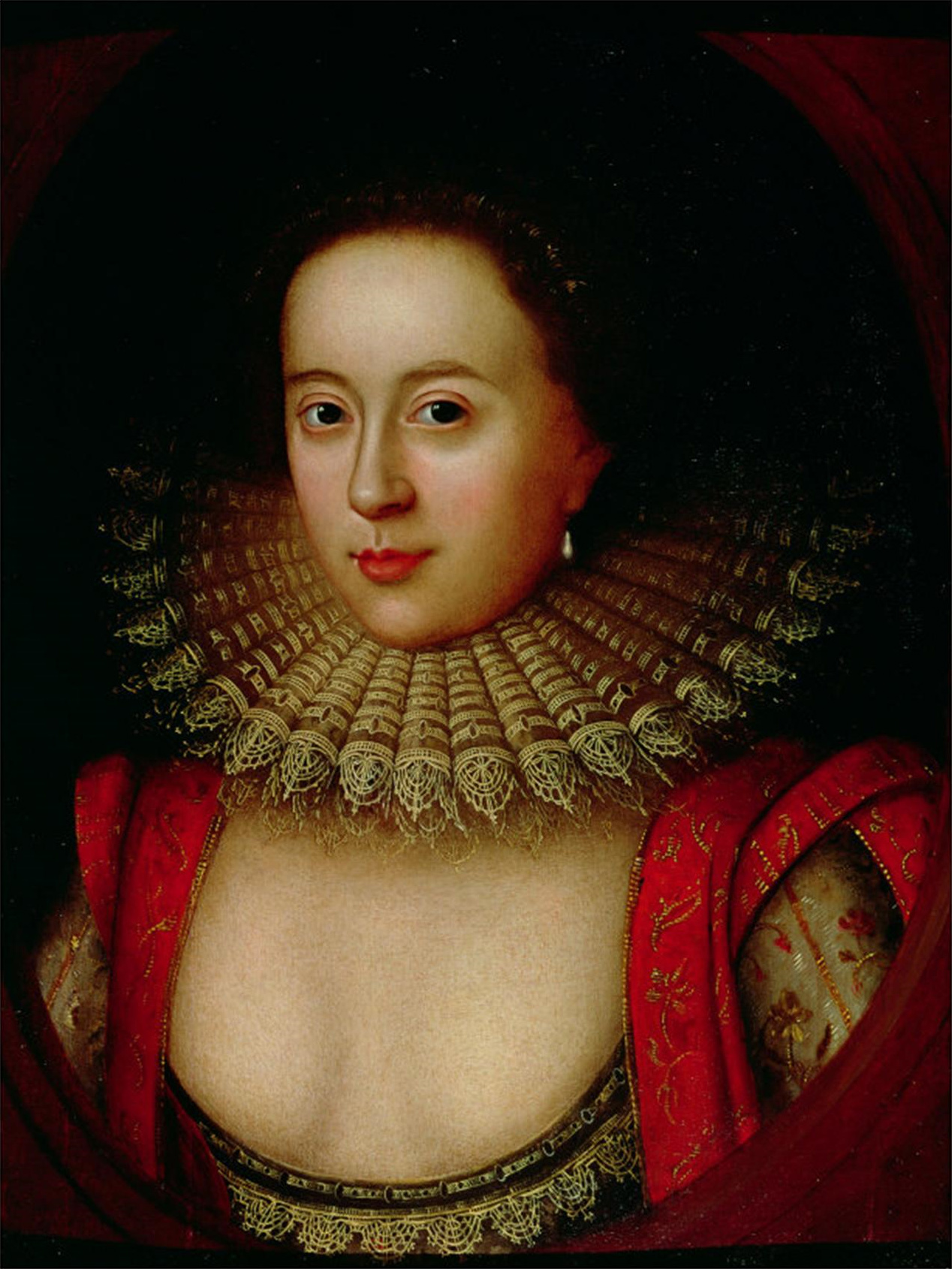
Frances Carr, Countess of Somerset, by William Larkin, NPG.

The Somerset Masque, sometimes known as The Squire's Masque, was written by Thomas Campion and performed on 26 December 1613 at the old Banqueting House at Whitehall Palace, to celebrate the wedding of Robert Carr, 1st Earl of Somerset and Frances Howard. Anne of Denmark, queen consort of James VI and I, took part in the performance by offering a branch from a magic golden tree.

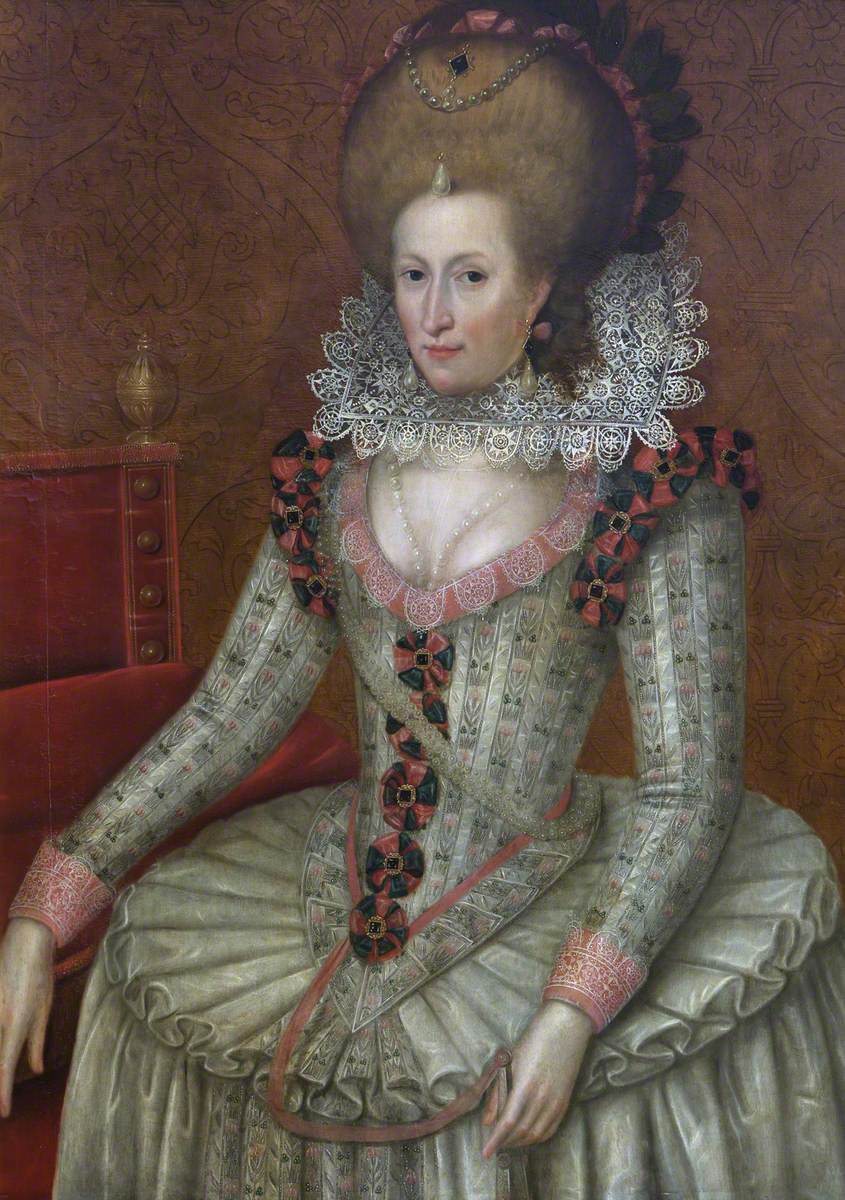
Anne of Denmark, after John de Critz, Blickling Hall, National Trust.

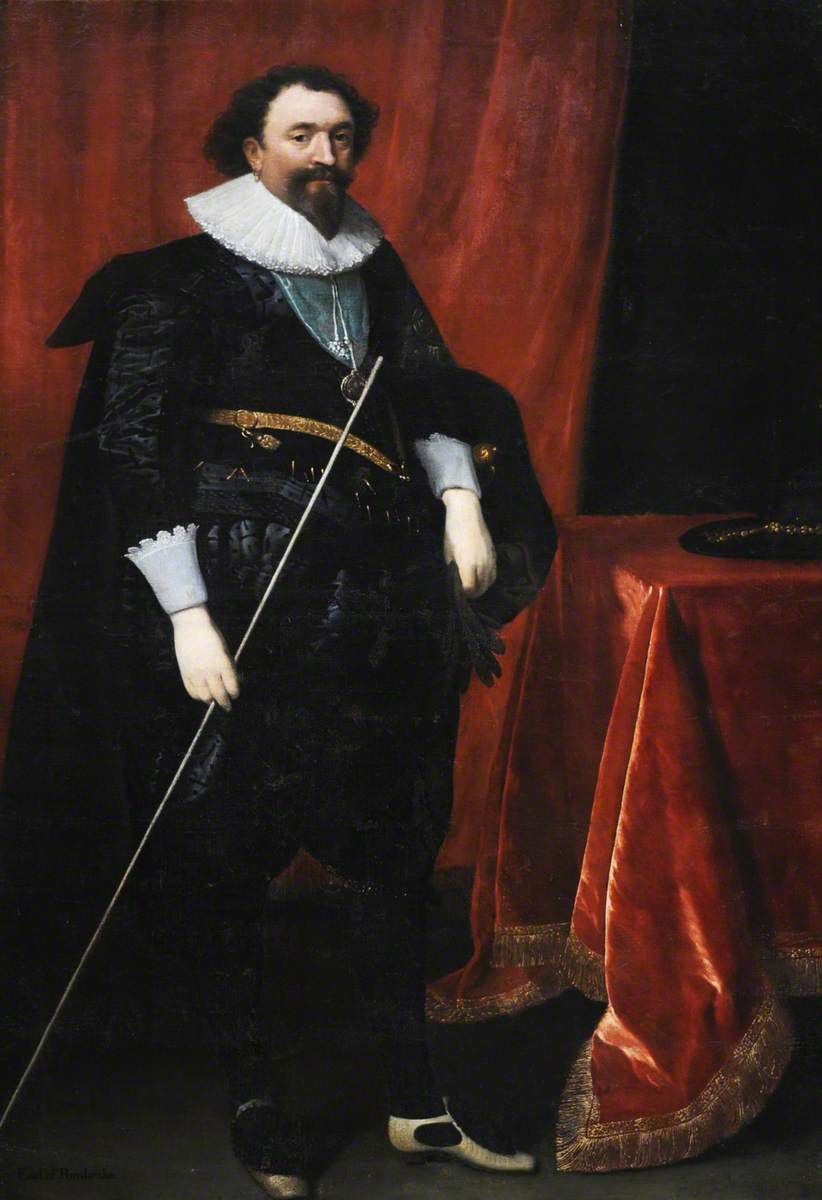
Somerset's friend, William Herbert, 3rd Earl of Pembroke, passed a branch from the magic tree to a Squire of the Enchanted Knights, Daniël Mijtens, Hardwick Hall, National Trust.

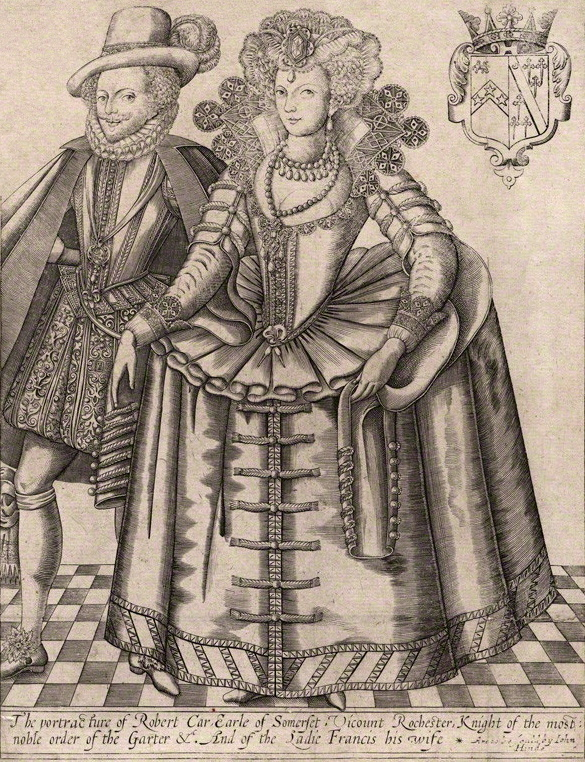
The Earl and Countess of Somerset, by Renold Elstracke

== Masques for a wedding ==
The scheme of The Somerset Masque appears to be derived from the story of Peleus and Thetis, as related by Catullus. Campion's masque on the night of the wedding ceremony was the first of a number of entertainments, including Ben Jonson's A Challenge at Tilt and The Irish Masque at Court, Thomas Middleton's lost Masque of Cupids, and The Masque of Flowers. The costs of the masque, excluding the costumes, were met by James VI and I. The master of ceremonies, Lewes Lewknor, invited diplomats to the events, and the recently arrived Spanish ambassador Diego Sarmiento de Acuña, 1st Count of Gondomar and his wife were seated close to Anne of Denmark at The Somerset Masque.

== The show ==
The speaking parts were delivered by four squires, hence the alternative title, The Squire's Masque. Error, Rumour, Curiousity and Credulity work their enchantments on a group of twelve knights who arrive by sea from the four quarters of the earth. The opening scene included a seascape, with ships, some "cunningly painted" others "artificially sailing". The Squires relate that their ships encountered a storm and sea serpents appeared. Six knights climbed the rigging with their swords drawn. Suddenly, the storm cleared, the serpents were gone, and the knights were transformed into pillars of gold.

While this tale is being told, two enchanters (Error and Rumour) and two enchantresses (Curiosity and Credulity, both in contrasting costumes painted with eyes and ears) appear on the stage, whispering together as if to celebrate their success. The four winds, the four elements, and the four corners of the earth (the four continents) appear in turn and dance, and dance together "in a strange kind of confusion". They depart from the stage dancing "by four and four". The whole world, it seems, is in discord.

The rescue or disenchantment of the knights is achieved by Eternity, assisted by the Three Destinies and Harmony, using a branch from Bel-Anna's golden tree, as Anne of Denmark and "only she, can all knotted spells untie". The tree of gold was carried to Anne of Denmark by the Destinies, while Harmony sang Vanish, vanish hence, Confusion. The knights' predicament is understood to represent the false rumour and notoriety surrounding the Carr/Howard marriage, to be dispelled by royal authority.

The lyric Bring away this sacred Tree, sung by Nicholas Lanier, credits the queen with facilitating the marriage of the king's favourite, although she had previously opposed it. Anne passed a bough of the tree to William Herbert, 3rd Earl of Pembroke, a noted supporter of Somerset, and here an actor and mediator in "a chain of accomodation".

Ben Jonson had given her the name Bel-Anna in The Masque of Queens. Considering Anne of Denmark's dislike of Somerset and the Howard family, Barbara Kiefer Lewalski suggests this role in The Somerset Masque "constrains the use of her power to an unwelcome arena", and for Clare McManus represents a "real political capitulation in front of the watching court". The queen's acquiescence to the marriage, her "late pacification", is thought to have been connected with the king's gift of Greenwich Palace, added to her jointure in November 1613. The gift would lead her into conflict with the Earl of Northampton.

A chorus draws attention to the central conceit of the masque, an inversion or reversal of traditional chivalric gender roles. Anne, as the Squires announce, is the Queen of Dames:

Since knightly valour rescues Dames distressed,
By virtuous Dames let charmed Knights be released.

Next, after the spell is unravelled, twelve lords dance as six formerly enchanted knights and six reanimated gold pillars; they were the Duke of Lennox, Earl of Pembroke, Earl of Dorset, Earl of Salisbury, Earl of Montgomery, Lord Walden, Lord Scrope, Lord North, Lord Hay, and the "three brethren of Lord Walden", Thomas Howard, Henry Howard, and Charles Howard. The lords-masquers descended in a stage cloud designed by Costantino de' Servi, the device was a disappointment as the rope and pulleys were visible and it was noisy in operation. Spectators compared it with the winch of a portcullis and the noise made when lowering a ship's mast.

The knights dance to songs written by John Coprario. Then they dance with ladies from the audience. When the knights return to their seats on the stage, four London barges appear with their singing skippers. The Squires wish the audience goodnight. The show concludes with Haste aboard, an appeal to Hymen and Venus:

Haste aboard, hast now away,
Hymen frowns at your delay;
Hymen doth long nights affect,
Yield him then his due respect.

The sea-born Goddess straight will come,
Quench these lights and make all dumb,
Some sleep, others she will call;
And so good-night to all, good-night to all.

== Performance notes ==
Richard Ansell, a specialist matlayer, covered the floor of the Banqueting house and hall with green cloth for the masque. One would-be performer, the courtier Henry Bowyer (a son of William Bowyer of Denham), died after over-exertion at the rehearsals. John Chamberlain provided an unfavourable review of Campion's masque "I heare litle or no commendation of the maske made by the Lords that night, either for devise or dauncing, only yt was rich and costly". Campion himself criticised the stage machinery devised by Costantino de' Servi, who was said to have been secretive and unprofessional.

On the following day King James, Prince Charles, and Somerset took part in a tournament of running at the ring. A tournament of tilting was held on New Year's Day. The bride's team wore "murrey" and white and the groom's team were in green and yellow. The Lord Mayor's masque, Middleton's lost Masque of Cupids, was performed on 4 January 1614 at the Merchant Taylor's Hall, and the royal family did not attend.

Lanier's song Bring away this sacred Tree, printed with music in 1614, proved popular and was included in manuscript collections. The queen's chamberlain, Robert Sidney, Viscount Lisle, had anticipated Jonson's The Irish Masque would include the "choicest dancers" at court, among them Sergeant Boyd, Abercromby, and Auchmoutie. James Bowie, sergeant of the wine cellar may have been "Boyd". Although John Chamberlain observed the subject matter of The Irish Masque was considered offensive to Irish people, King James ordered a repeat performance.

== Costume for The Somerset Masque ==
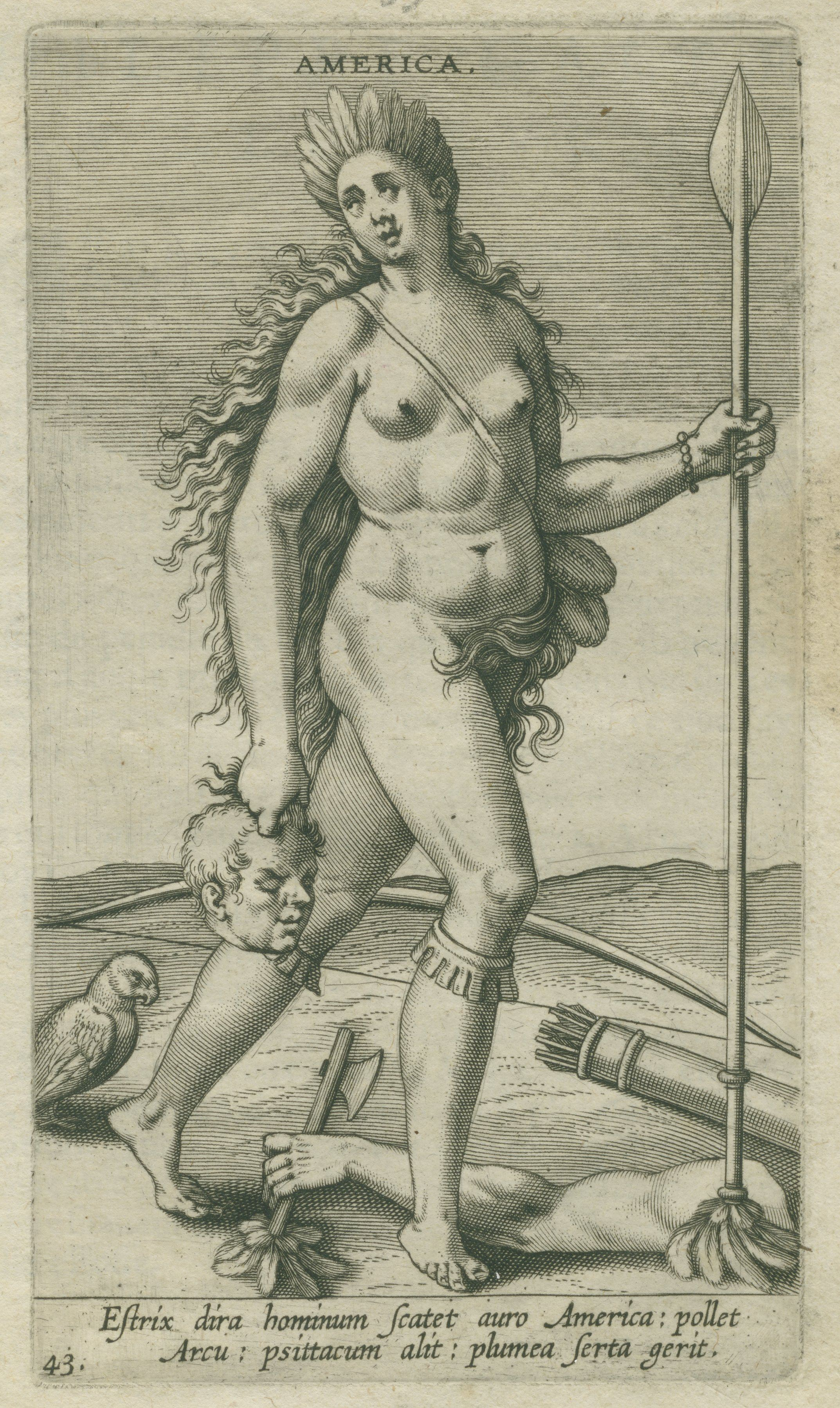
America was personified as a female figure with a feathered head dress in European court culture, Philips Galle, Rijksmuseum.

Male dancers presented the four elements and the four winds in coloured "skin coats". The winged Eastern Wind wore a coat of yellow, the Western Wind a coat of dark crimson, the Southern Wind dark russet, and the Northern Wind a "gisled skin-coat". Earth was grass-green, with "a mantle painted full of trees, plants and flowers, and on his head an oak growing". Water's skin coat was "waved", with a mantle full of fishes. Air's coat was sky-coloured, and Fire's coat was painted with flames.

The four continents were represented by women (or men dressed as women) dancing in a "strange kind of confusions"; Europe was "in the habit of an Empress with an Imperial crown on her head", Asia wore "a Persian ladies habit with a crown on her head", Africa was "like a Queen of the Moors, with a crown", and America was personified with "a skin coat the colour of the juice of mulberries, on her head large round brims of many coloured feathers, and in the midst of it a small crown".

An ambassador from Savoy, Giovanni Battista Gabaleoni, wrote a description of the performance. He may not have fully understood the nuance of the language. Barbara Ravelhofer gives a translation of his report. He wrote that the twelve masquers came down in a cloud, and one could see the ropes that supported it, and hear the pulleys, or rather wheels, making the same noise as when they raise or lower the mast of ship." He mentions a dance to the tune of violins of "twelve lords, principal gentlemen, clothed in a tunic just to the middle of the thigh, closely fitted to the body, with layers in the antique fashion of crimson satin all embroidered with gold and silver, crimson stockings all garnished with gold ribbons, socks of silk embroidered, the shoes and their roses loaded with diamonds".

A group of rejoicing Thames mariners on barges "artificially presented", described by Campion as "skippers with red caps, with short cassocks and long slops, wide at the knees, of white canvas striped with crimson", were according to Gabaleoni, "clothed in linen and red berets in the manner of slaves, and danced in a peasant fashion". This concluding scene evokes the actual everyday journeys of the performers and audience home by river.

== The golden tree at Somerset House ==
Anne of Denmark's collection at Somerset House on the Strand included a golden palm tree which was shown to visitors including, in 1613, John Ernest I, Duke of Saxe-Weimar. The object, which seems to have included a clock and also functioned as table fountain, carried a Latin inscription composed by her Scottish secretary William Fowler. This epigram was based on his anagram of her name; "Anna Brittanorum Regina" - "In anna regnantium arbor". The anagram was printed in Henry Peacham's Minerva Brittana (London, 1612), with an image of an olive tree bearing the initials of her three children, Henry, Charles, and Elizabeth.

Gabaleoni identified the tree in The Somerset Masque as an olive, and thus symbolic of peace-making, and scholars including Clare McManus connect the use of the verse and Peacham's emblem with the tree produced in the masque. William Fowler provided a translation of the verse, found among his manuscripts in the National Library of Scotland:

Freshe budding blooming trie,
from ANNA faire which springs,
Growe on blist birth with leaves and fruit,
from branche to branche in kings.
