= William Fairlie =

Edinburgh merchant and burgess (fl. 1570–1600)

William Fairlie or Fairley (fl. 1570–1600) was an Edinburgh merchant and burgess.

Fairlie was frequently asked by Edinburgh town (burgh) council to survey and account for public works for the town council of Edinburgh. He was described as a "procurator" and a "collector" of the town's revenues. The dates of Fairlie's birth and death and details of his own mercantile business are unclear. He seems to have been the son of John Fairlie, a burgess of Edinburgh, and was later knighted. They came to own the manor of Bruntsfield in Edinburgh in 1603, which had been a property of Alexander Lauder of Hatton and his second wife Annabella Bellenden.

== Career ==
The historian Michael Lynch has identified Fairlie as a member of an anti-Morton and anti-Ruthven faction on the burgh council in the early 1580s. His older brothers, Mungo and David Fairlie had been "queen's men" during the Marian civil war.

In October 1579 James VI made a ceremonial Entry to Edinburgh. He was given a cupboard of silver gilt plate made by the Edinburgh goldsmiths Edward Hart, Thomas Annand, George Heriot, Adam Craig and William Cokky. The cupboard included a basin and a laver, two flasks, six cups and covers, four candle holders, a salt, a silver salver, and dozen silver plates. Fairlie was asked to oversee the gilding of the silver on 8 October and assist Henry Nesbit make an account of the expenses.

On 17 January 1584 Fairlie and Alexander Oustean, a tailor, were made commissioners to go Alexander Beaton, Archdeacon of Lothian to ask him to surrender his benefice and the parsonage of Currie for the newly founded University of Edinburgh. He was asked to raise funds to relieve those suffering from plague at Wemyss in Fife in August 1584. In July 1585 he was asked to provide the "foul-clengers" on Edinburgh burgh moor, who disinfected plague victim's goods, with a staff topped with a wicker taper.

=== Piracy ===
Farlie was commissioned by the town to investigate the claims of ship owners robbed by pirates. In February 1587 with the merchant John Robertson he took sworn statements from the merchants who had lost their London goods in the Sea Cat of Andrew Redpath. In July he was sent to the Convention of Royal Burghs in Dundee with instructions to get help to repel an English pirate haunting the mouth of the Firth. He was then to go Falkland Palace to get the consent of James VI for action against the pirate ship.

=== Sailors from the Armada ===
On 28 October 1588 Fairlie and the Provost of Edinburgh, John Arnot of Birswick issued a pass for 46 Spanish and Italian sailors who had been shipwrecked on the coast of Ireland, and were to transported to France on the Mary Grace or Grace of God. The men had been crew or soldiers of the Ballanzara, (La Trinidad Valencera) wrecked in Ireland.

In 1589 the English admiral George Beeston took a fleet to Scotland. Their purpose was likely a show of support for the Danish marriage plans of James VI. On 1 June Beeston arrived in the Forth on the Vanguard followed by Edward Croft in the Tiger with the Achates. On 5 June some of the English crewmen came ashore into Edinburgh to shop and sightsee. Three got in fight in a tavern, one was stabbed, and as returned to Leith and their ship they were attacked by a group of Spanish sailors, survivors from the Armada shipwrecks. An English trumpet officer, was killed. Beeston and the English ambassador William Ashby had an audience with James VI on 7 June at the Palace of Holyroodhouse seeking an enquiry and justice. Ashby and Thomas Fowler wrote that the king treated the sailors honourably; James VI gave Beeston a locket set with diamonds and 100 gold crowns and gold chains and rings provided by the goldsmith Thomas Foulis to his captains. James requested that Edinburgh town council give Beeston his three captains, and the English ambassadors an "honest banquet" in Nicol Edward's new house. The banquet was organised by William Fairlie.

On 30 September 1589 Fairlie and others were sent to view and mark the bounds of the site for a new leper house founded by the donation of the merchant John Robertson who had vowed to found a hospice while in peril on the sea.

On 18 February 1590 Fairlie, with Edward Galbraith, John Johnston, and Andrew Sclater, the town's master of work, was asked to survey St Mary's Chapel and its lands in Niddry's Wynd.

=== Anne of Denmark ===
He was involved in the reception of Anne of Denmark. He made an account for the gifts the town gave her, including a psalm book, a Bible, a jewel reworked by the goldsmith David Gilbert (nephew of Michael Gilbert), and the canopy (or "paill") carried above her as she progressed through the town. James Workman painted six staff carrying the paill. Robert Jousie supplied passementerie for the paill and purple velvet for bags for the books. Fairlie was also tasked with Michael Chisholm to buy the food for a banquet given by the burgh to the Danish ambassadors, which was held in the lodging of Thomas Acheson, master of the mint, at the foot of Todrig's Wynd on 24 May.

In August 1593 the burgh council sent him to Prestonpans to assess a ship belonging to Thomas Hallis which was impounded because the passengers from London were infected with plague. The passengers were isolated at Newhaven by Leith. In May 1595 he was sent to Aberlady to investigate a ship suspected of illegally exporting wheat with the assistance of the Laird of Kilspyndie.

The dates of Fairlie's birth and death and details of his own mercantile business are unclear.
