= Coronation of King James =

Coronation of King James may refer to:

- Coronation of James VI as King of Scotland in 1567
- Coronation of James I as King of England in 1603
