= Personification of the Americas =

Early European personifications of the Americas

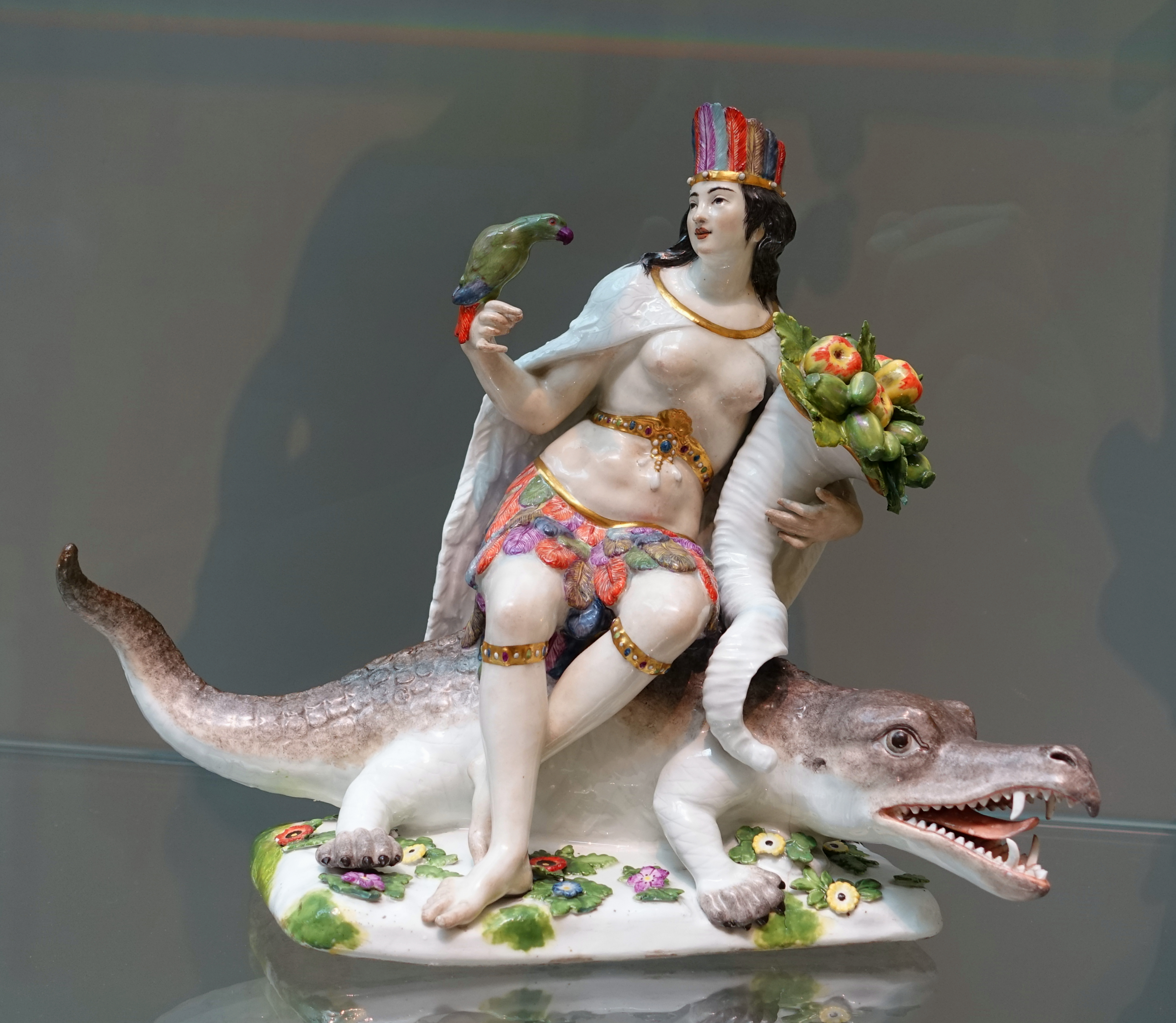
Meissen porcelain, c. 1760, modeled by Johann Joachim Kändler, who did several versions of the Four continents

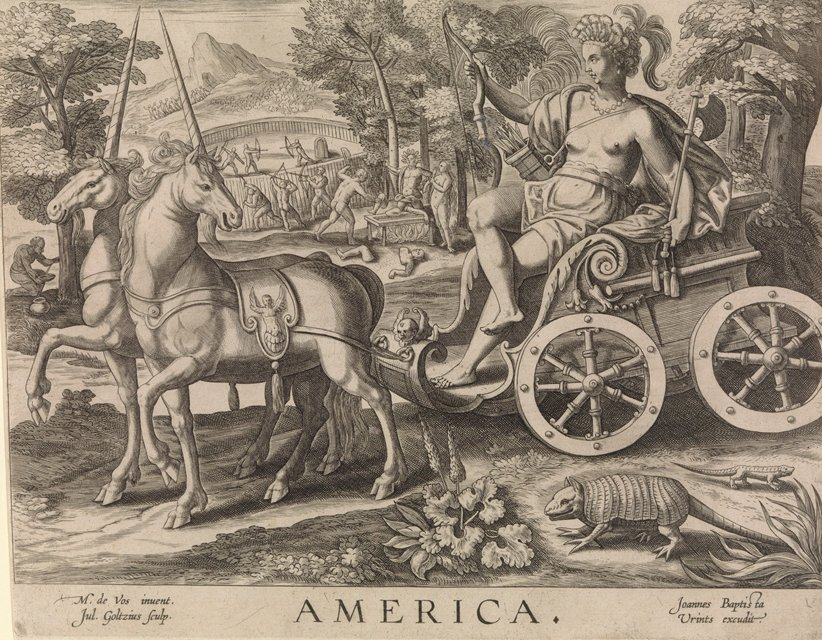
America, from the Four continents engraved by Julius Goltzius after design by Maerten de Vos, before 1595. Fighting and cannibalism are present in the background.

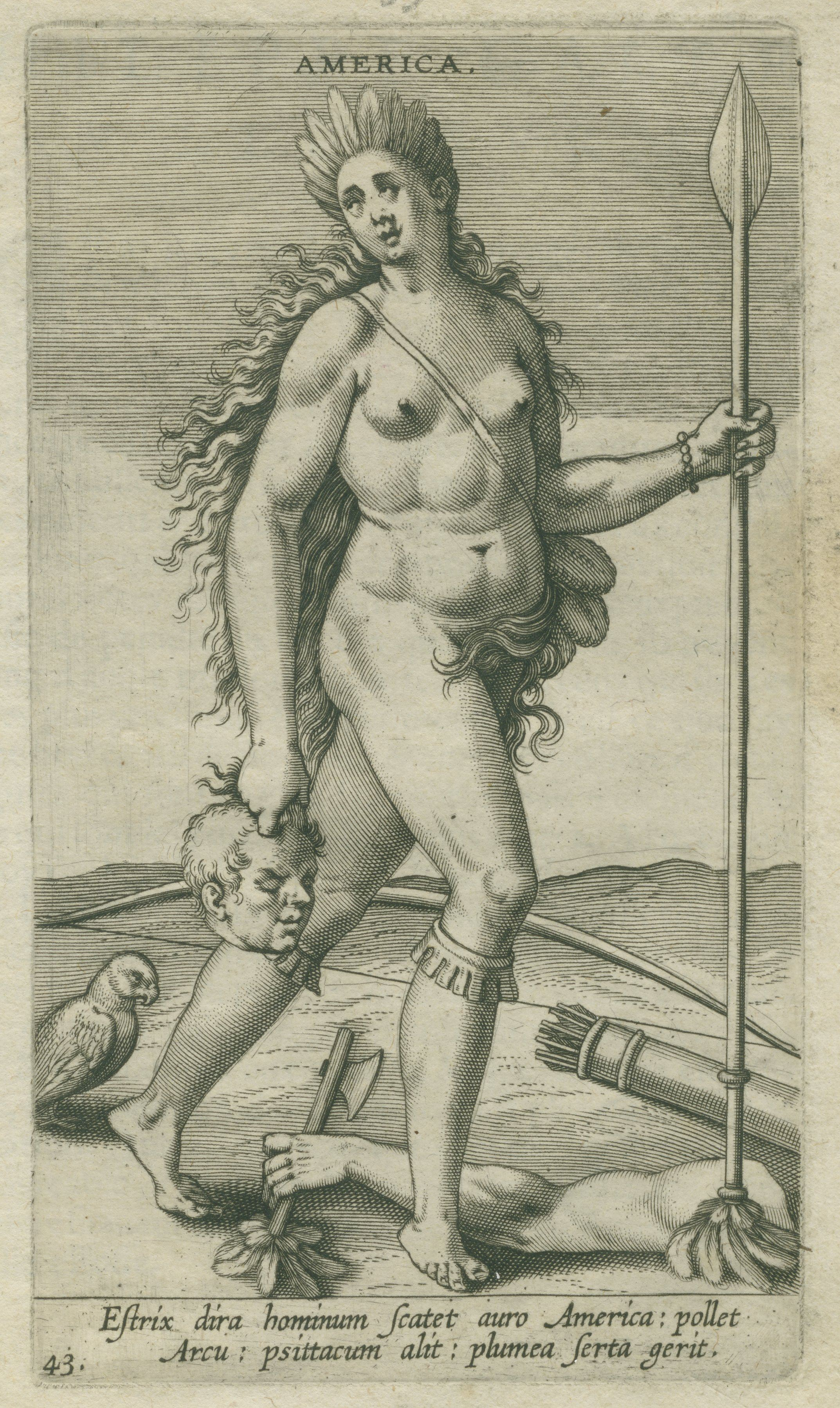
America was personified as a female figure with a feathered head dress in European court culture, Philips Galle, Rijksmuseum.

Personifications of the Americas were created by Europeans after the discovery of the Americas. These depictions usually portrayed America as a female figure donned in Native American clothing and symbols commonly recognised as part of the Indian princess archetype.

Personifications of the Americas were typically featured as a member of the four known continents at the time: Europe, Asia, Africa, and America. The addition of America made these an even more attractive group to represent visually, as images of the four continents made a convenient symbol to decorate four-sided objects or as even pairs. A set of loose conventions quickly arose as to the iconography of the personifications, normally being female, half-dressed, and given exotic props. One of the earliest and most persistent attributes for America was the parrot, which reached Europe by the early 16th century and were highly valued. The feather crown headdress, reflected the actual headgear of some American peoples. A cornucopia, representing the new edible plants from the Americas, was also a common feature. America is often accompanied by a caiman or alligator, though the earliest images depict her with an armadillo and other exotic creatures.

Early depictions were set by reports from Central and South America. In the 17th and 18th century, British America began to use personifications based on Britannia and Liberty, as well as Columbia, the current personification of the United States. As more independent nations arose in the Americas, new national personifications were adopted by those countries.

== European images ==
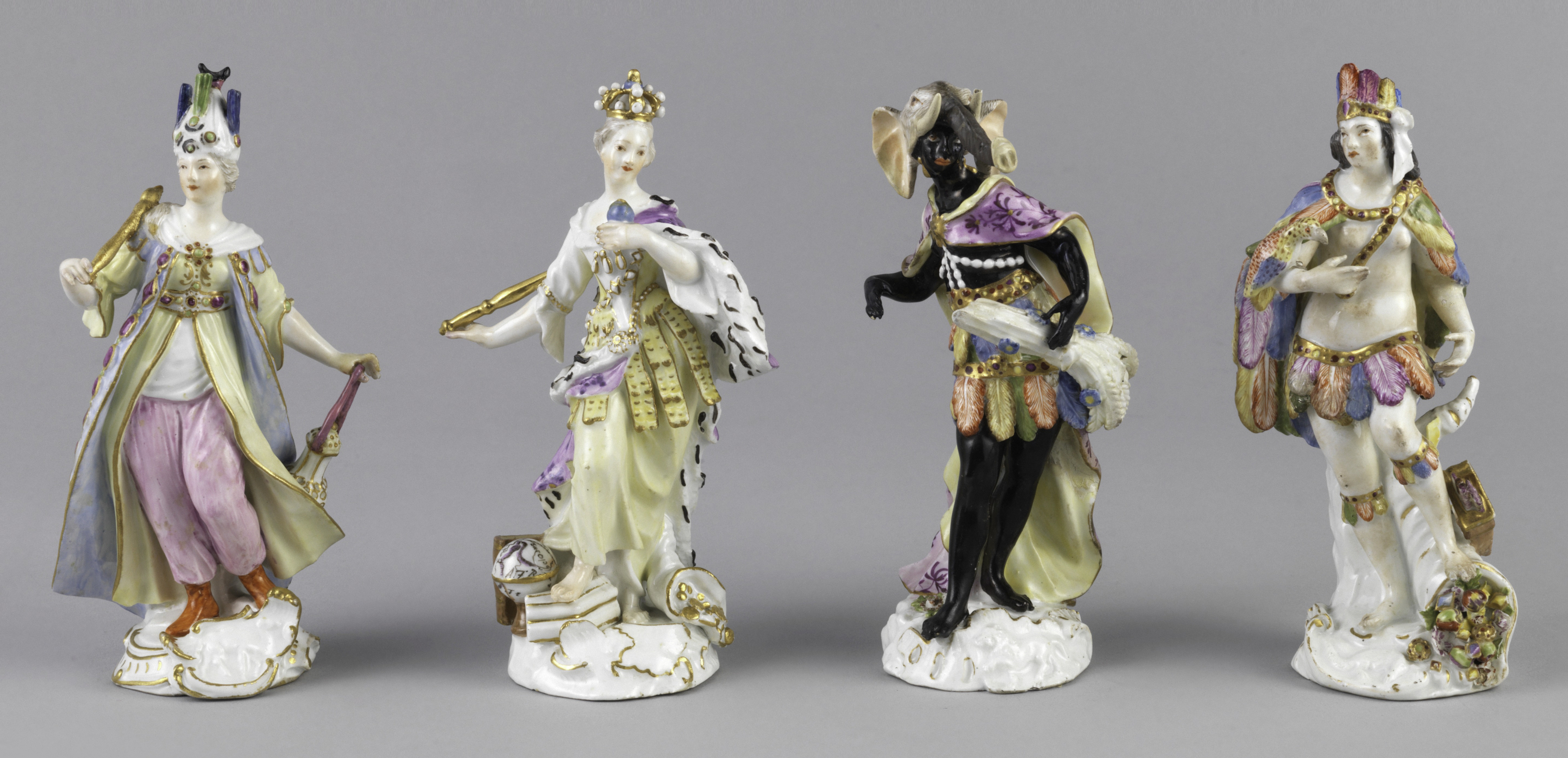
Set of porcelain figures, German, c. 1775, from left: Asia, Europe, Africa, America, with parrot and cornucopia.

The addition of America to the previous three continents or "parts of the world" was not immediate after 1492, as it took some years to establish that America was not an eastern edge of Asia, and was a very large land mass comparable to the others. The very notion of a continent was uncertain, and contemporary intellectuals tried to integrate the newly-discovered lands into the already complicated and disputed picture of world geography inherited from the Ancient Greeks.

Some of the earliest recorded personifications came from the court of Cosimo I de' Medici, Grand Duke of Tuscany in Florence. Although not at all involved in the exploration of the Americas (the Habsburgs had by the 1520s made it very difficult for any Italians to travel there), the Medicis were very interested in them, and had acquired a good collection of artifacts, plants, and animals. For Cosimo's politically important wedding to Eleanor of Toledo, a distant cousin of Charles V, in 1539, the lavish street decorations for the procession included images of Charles with personifications of Spain, New Spain and Peru. No images survive, but the official festival book has text descriptions, although they had clearly not been explained properly to the author. He says the naked New Spain held a "pine cone", no doubt intended to be a pineapple, and Peru "had with her a sheep with a long neck" – a llama. Charles's own wedding procession in 1526 in Seville had included representations of American Indians.

Such images as bows and arrows, clubs, and indications of cannibalism would be closely intertwined with the artistic conception of the Americas as a reflection of the idealization of America as a place of savagery and tropical wilderness. At this time, America personified predominantly possessed elements associated with hot, tropical environs of the regions of the Americas first explored.

Depictions of America included exotic background details, especially fauna unknown in Europe such as "the parrot or macaw, turtle, armadillo, tapir, sloth, jaguar, and alligator." However, the tattoos worn by both sexes, which astonished early writers, were omitted by artists based in Europe, though drawn by travelers. They may have been thought indecorous on female personifications.

The personification was staged at Whitehall Palace in December 1613 by a dancer in The Somerset Masque wearing "a skin coat the colour of the juice of mulberries, on her head large round brims of many coloured feathers, and in the midst of it a small crown".

While Europe possessed the image of a noble or a Roman goddess, America "was usually envisioned as a rather fierce savage – only slightly removed in type from the medieval tradition of the wild man." This is not to suggest that only America was radically different from Europe in terms of the figure's appearance. Outside of personification, Asia took a dramatically different appearance from Europe. This is seen in the print The Entry of the Ambassador of Persia into Paris, Seen in the Place Royal, 7 February 1715. Coming from the "very exotic kingdom of Persia," the plate depicts the Persian diplomat Mohammad Reza Beg with his entourage, almost all men with turbans, moustaches, distinctive noses, and robes, some bearing falchions. This does, however, argue that America was perhaps iconographically the most antithetical continent to Europe in most sets of the continents personified.

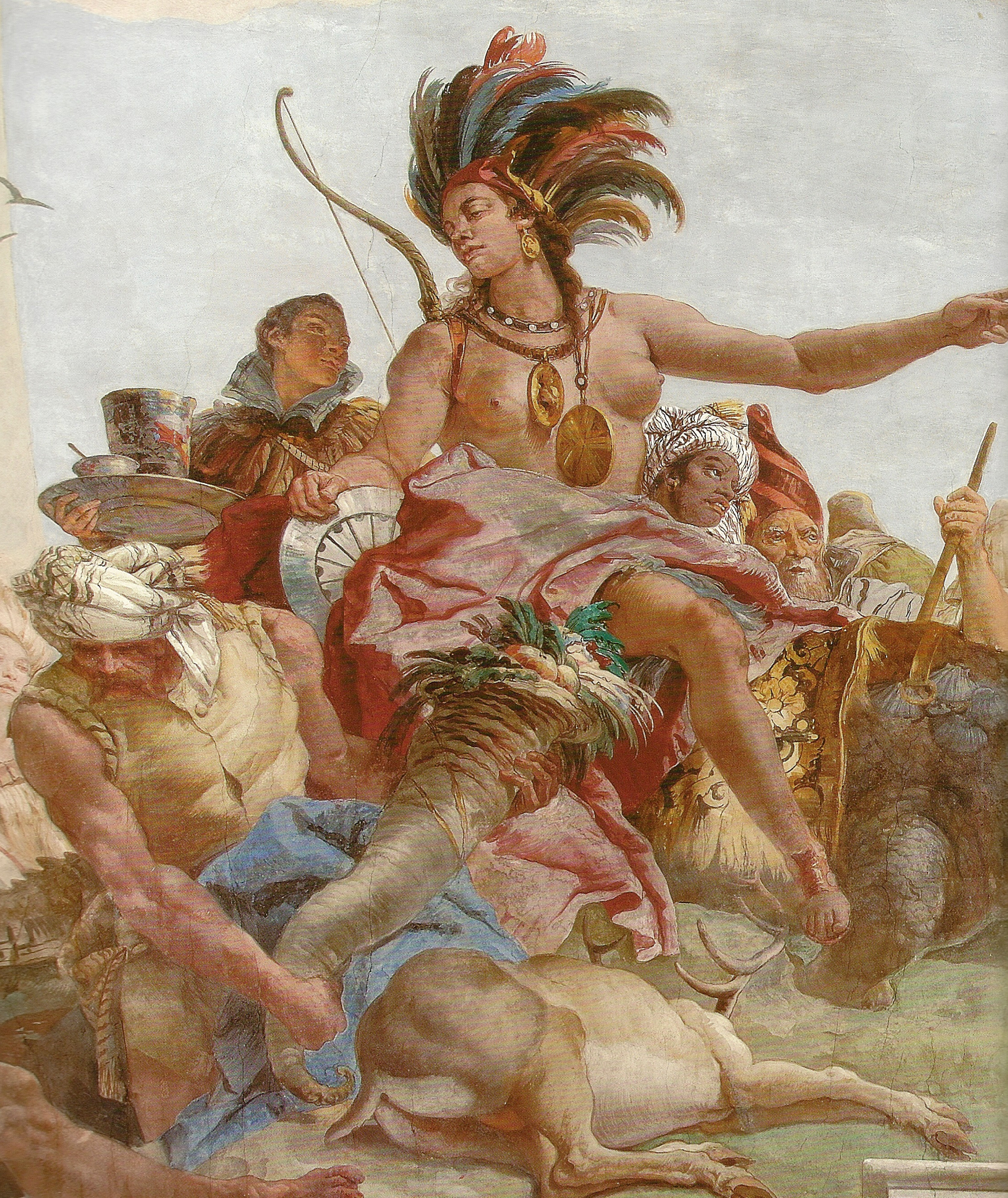
Giovanni Battista Tiepolo, fresco in the Würzburg Residenz, 1750s. America sits on a large alligator.

This disparity between the two continents is especially poignant in the continental personifications at the staircase in Würzburg. There, Europe is seen, in accordance with Ripa's depiction, as being the most nobly clad, in addition to being surrounded by relics of art, science, and the church. This is opposed by the depiction of America as naked, dressed in feathers, with a feathered crown, a bow, a parrot perched on her wrist, accompanied by a pile of heads. In addition to these disparate degrees of civility in their depictions, here Europe and America are shown to be in a direct relationship of religious superiority and subservience. In describing the Americas in terms of religious potential with regards to the paintings at Würzburg, it was argued about America that "One of the foremost connotations of this new world was religious, and specifically missionary."

In spite of the predominant conception of America personified as being a half-clad woman wearing feathers, holding a bow, and having a large reptile at her side and a disembodied head at her feet, not all images of America were made strictly in accordance with what was essentially Ripa's template for the continental personifications, nor did the cultural elements or wildlife depicted always stand up to what America's reality actually was. Indeed, as time went on, instead of familiarity breeding authenticity in depictions, artistic license became even more rampant. "As the New World became less threatening to Europeans, its personification grew softer, more decorative, more Arcadian. Amazons gave way to graceful young women, whom the European taste for exoticism endowed with an ever more voluptuous appeal." By virtue of this, the depiction of America as a wild savage shifted into being a noble savage, or Indian princess.

There were also inconsistencies in America's portrayal, particularly with the sort of animals accompanying her. Africa and America were often confused, with their conventional attributes being swapped around; presumably this was because both were considered hot and exotic. America has been shown with a number of animals not naturally found on the American continents, such as camels and elephants. These inaccuracies were encompassed in a larger conundrum of America and Africa being allowed to share iconography, even within the same context, as in one instance where America's and Africa's personifications are portrayed as children in the act of playing with each other.

== American images ==
The first personification images made by Europeans settled in America included some versions of the European types, including engravings by Paul Revere, but such European-Americans were not long happy being symbolised by Native Americans, with whom they were often at war. Before independence they had already begun to use figures combining aspects of Britannia and Liberty, and after it quickly dropped the former. The figures were now sometimes called "America" and sometimes "Liberty", later mostly settling on the latter. Through most of the 19th century American coins carried a neoclassical female head labelled "Liberty". Although Columbia was in literary use from around 1730, she does not seem to have been used in images until later, around 1800.

== Gallery ==
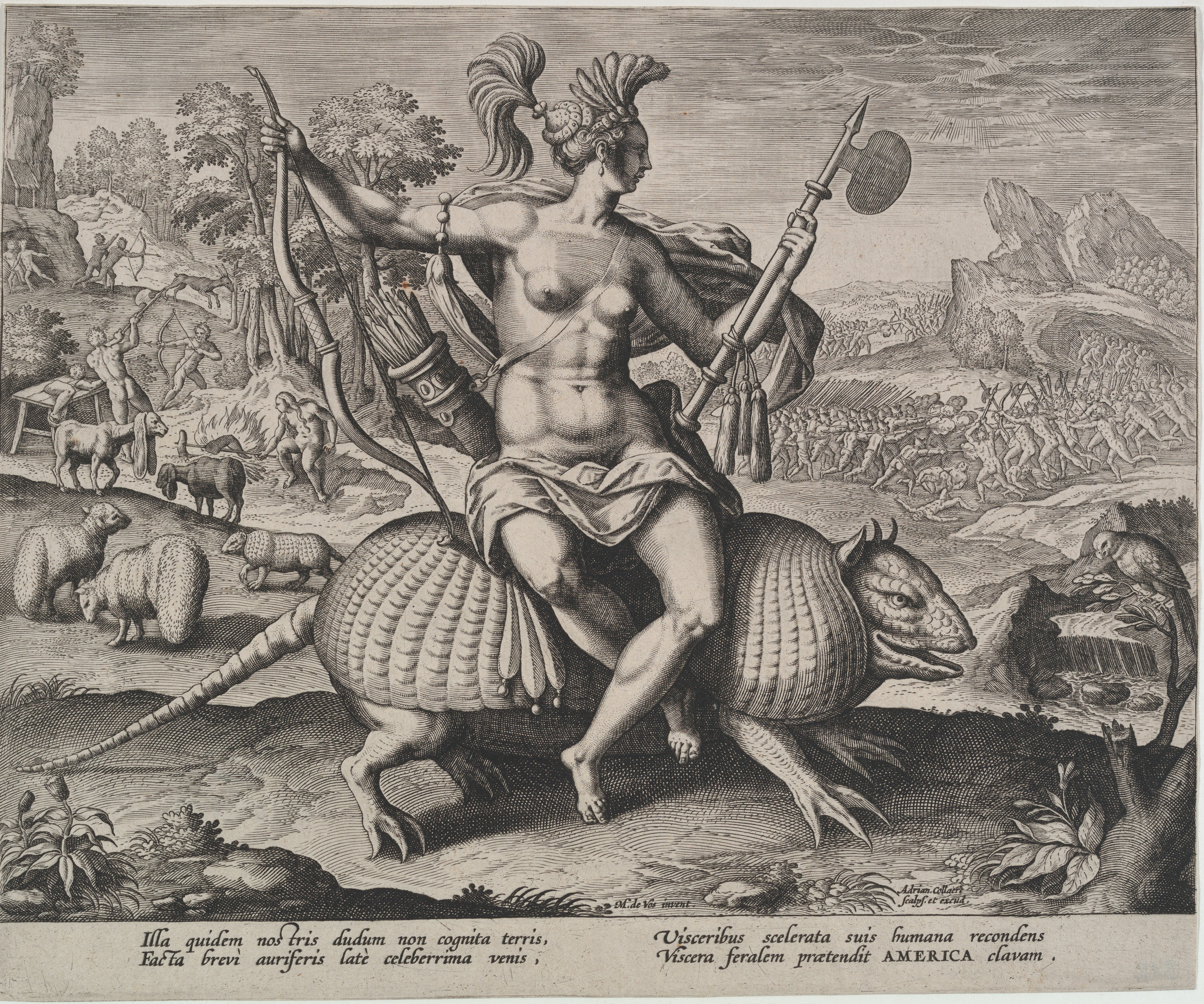
Engraving after Maerten de Vos, 16th century. Captives are being butchered and cooked in left background.

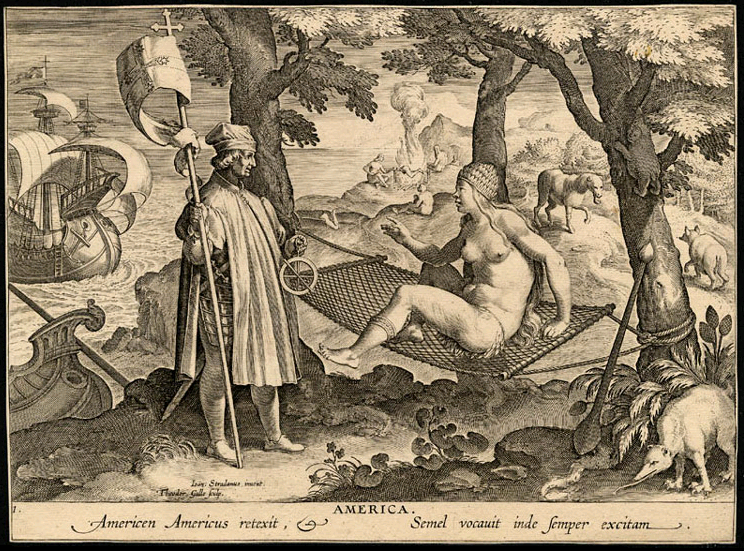
Theodor Galle after Stradanus, Amerigo Vespucci awakes America in her hammock, 1570s. In the background a captive is being roasted.

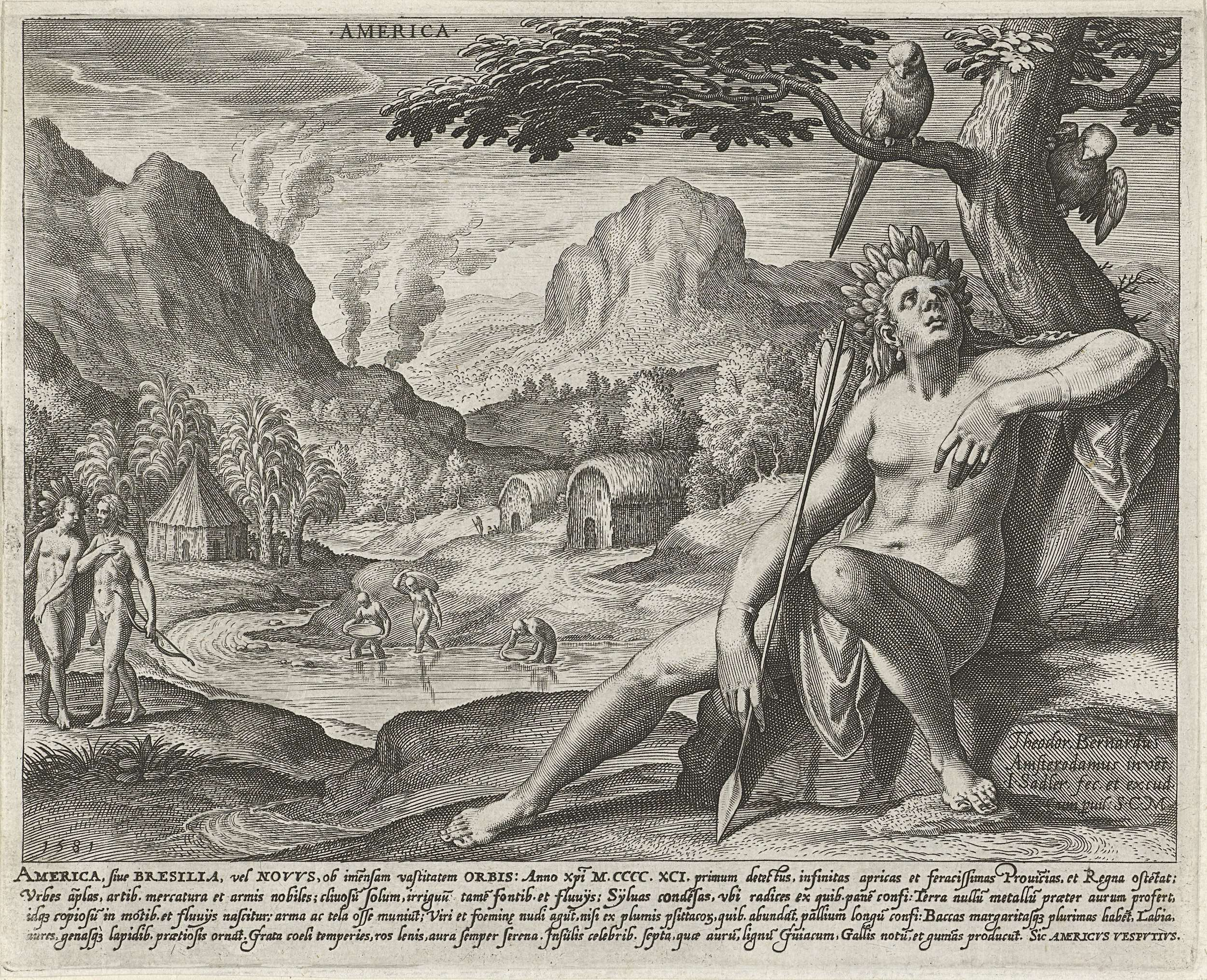
Engraving by Jan Sadeler, 1581, with a peaceful scene behind

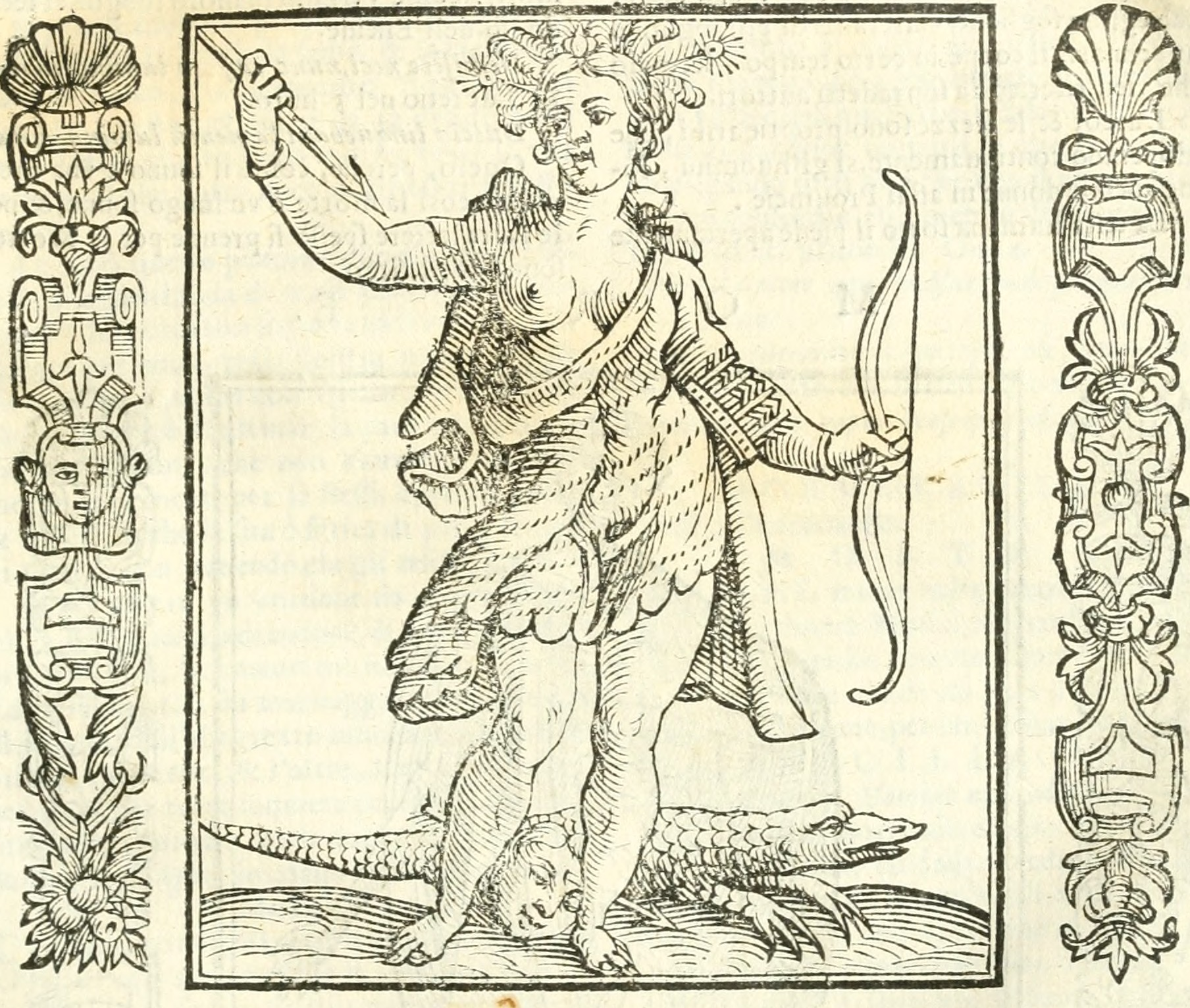
1618 edition of Cesare Ripa's emblem book Iconologia, with severed head and alligator between her feet

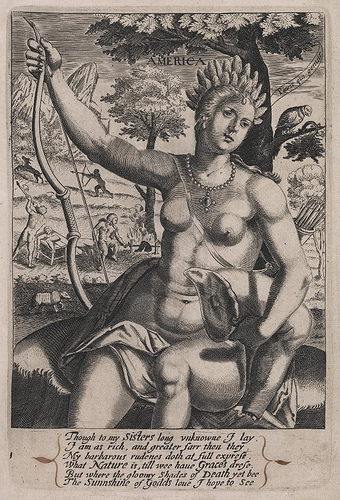
America holds a human leg, England, 1634.

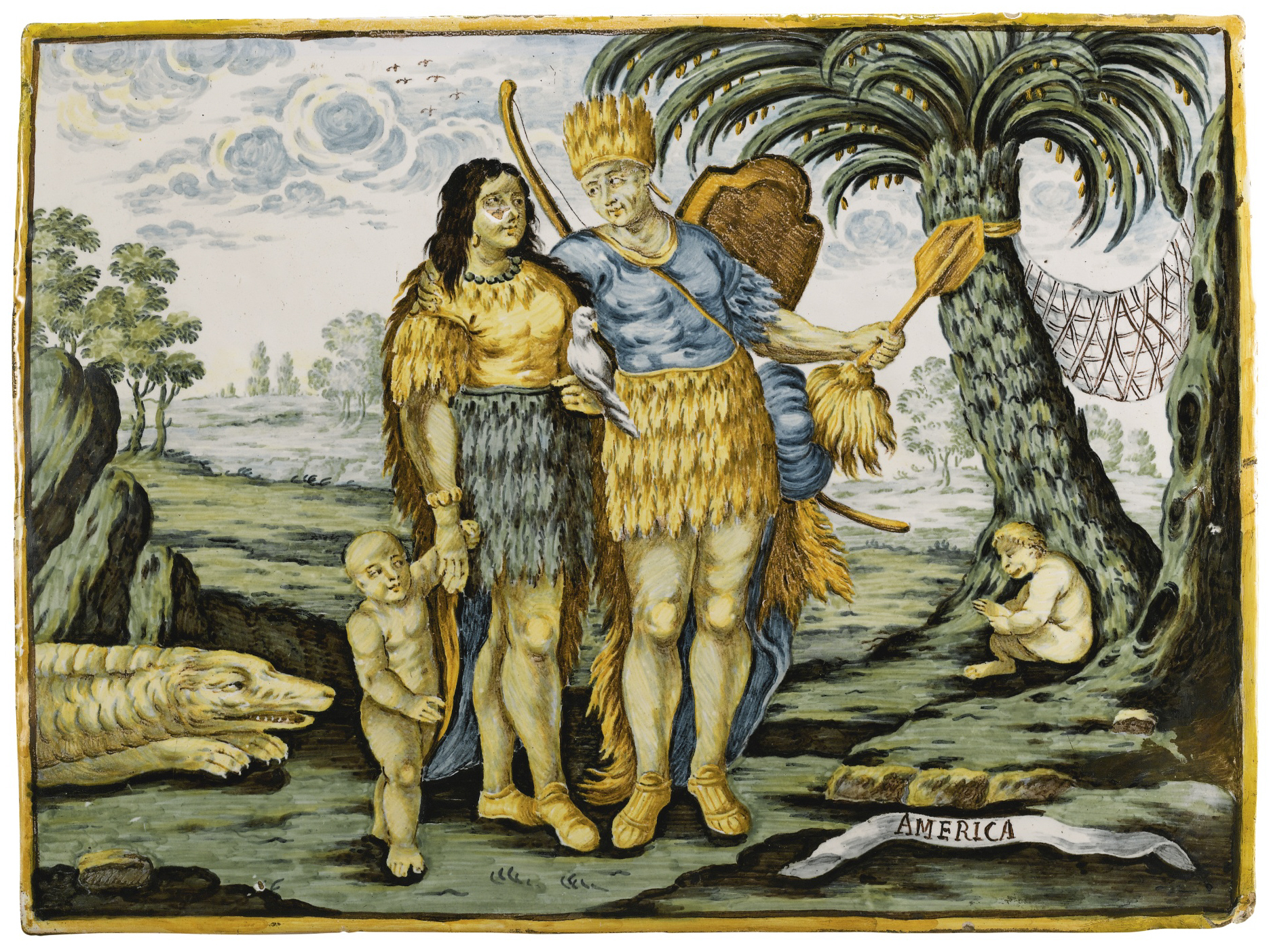
Italian majolica tile, 1740s

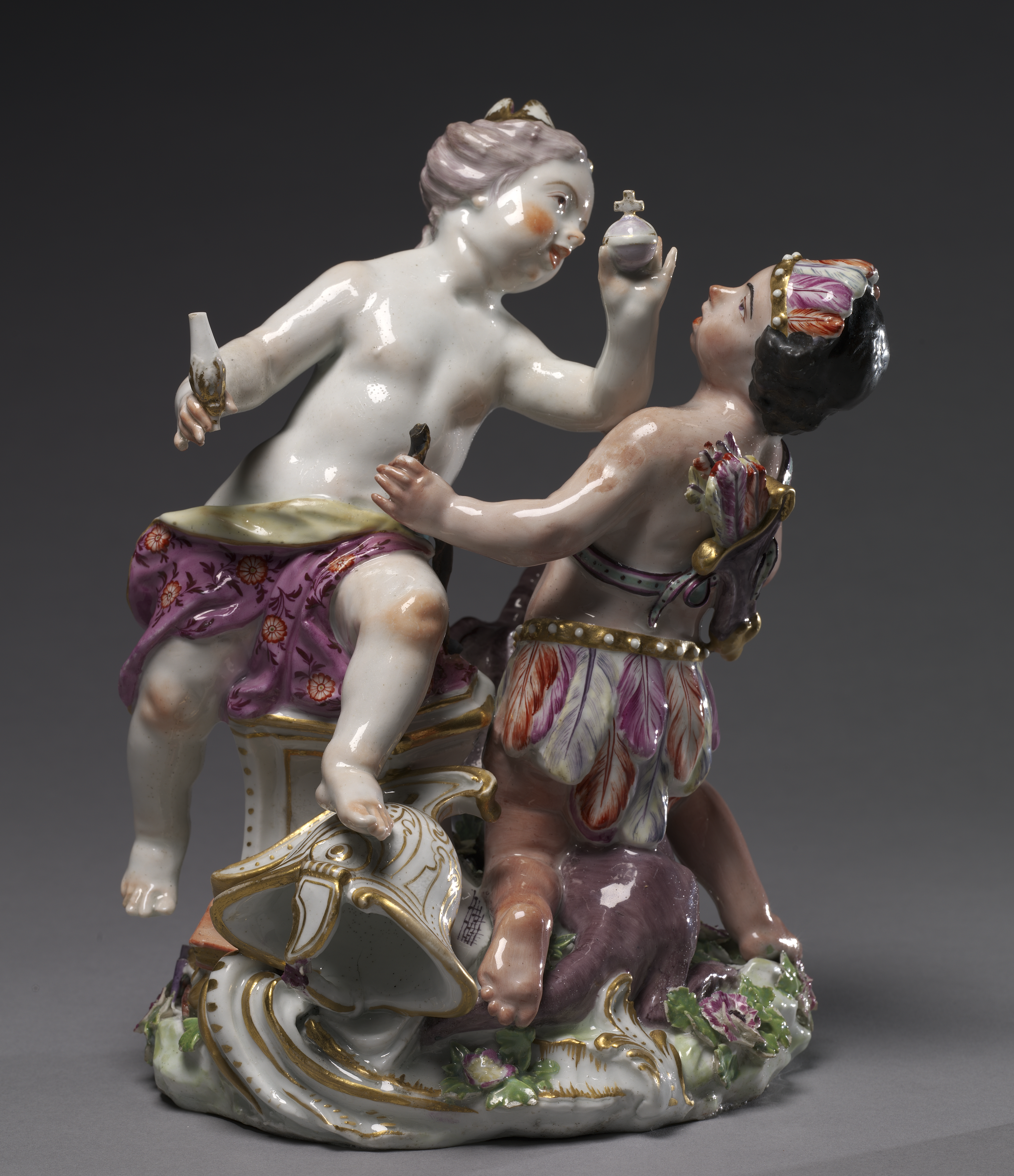
Chelsea porcelain, Europe and America (with their sceptre and bow now broken off), c. 1760. A purple alligator between America's feet.

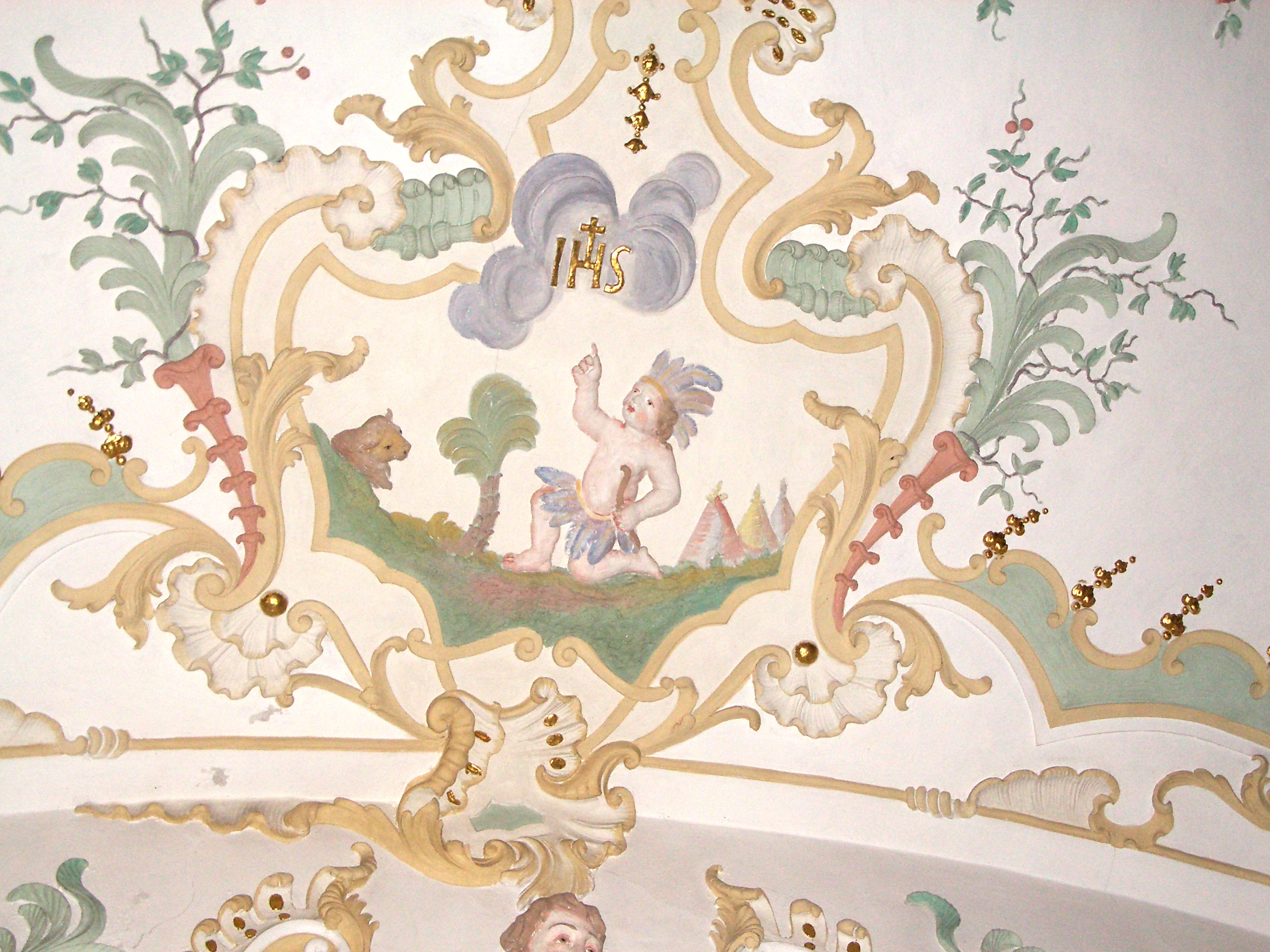
18th-century stucco in the Jesuit church, Mindelheim. Tepees and a bison appear to the sides.

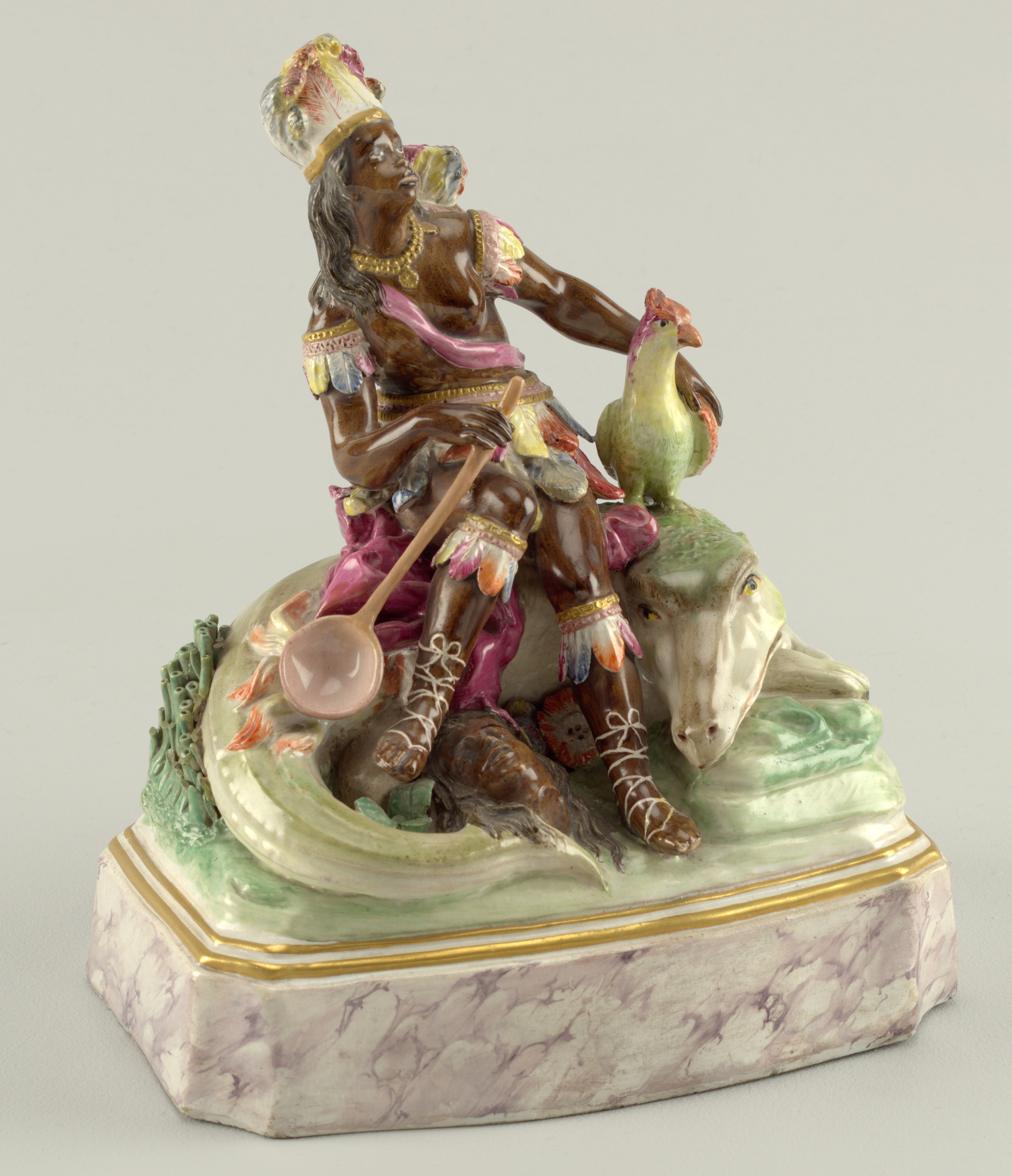
Spanish porcelain figure, c. 1770, with a severed head and alligator

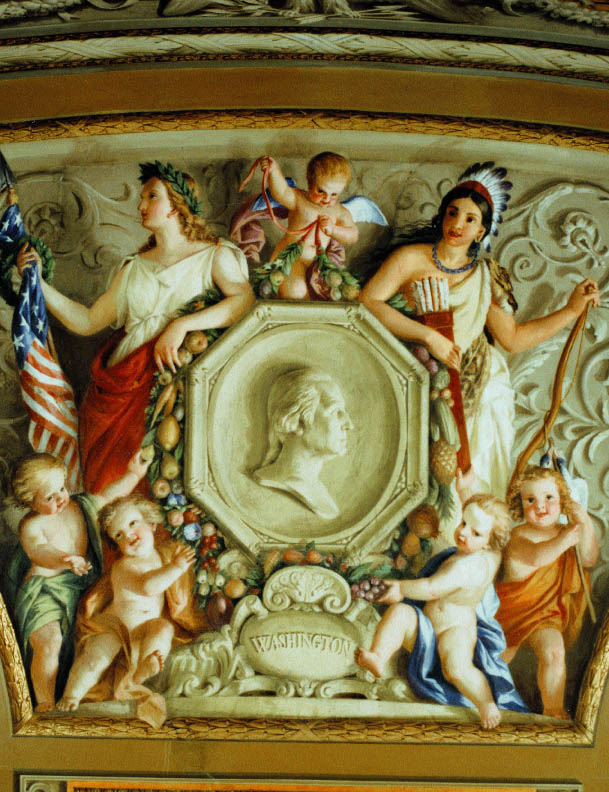
Detail from a 1855–1856 fresco by Constantino Brumidi in the U.S. Capitol in Washington, D.C., Columbia (left) and an Indian princess

One of four sculptures by Daniel Chester French, installed outside the Alexander Hamilton U.S. Custom House

== See also ==
- Europa regina
