= Costantino de' Servi =

Italian painter

Costantino or Costantini de' Servi (1554–1622) was an Italian painter, sculptor, garden designer and architect in the Renaissance.

== Early life ==
Born in 1554, de' Servi was the son of a diplomat.

== Career ==
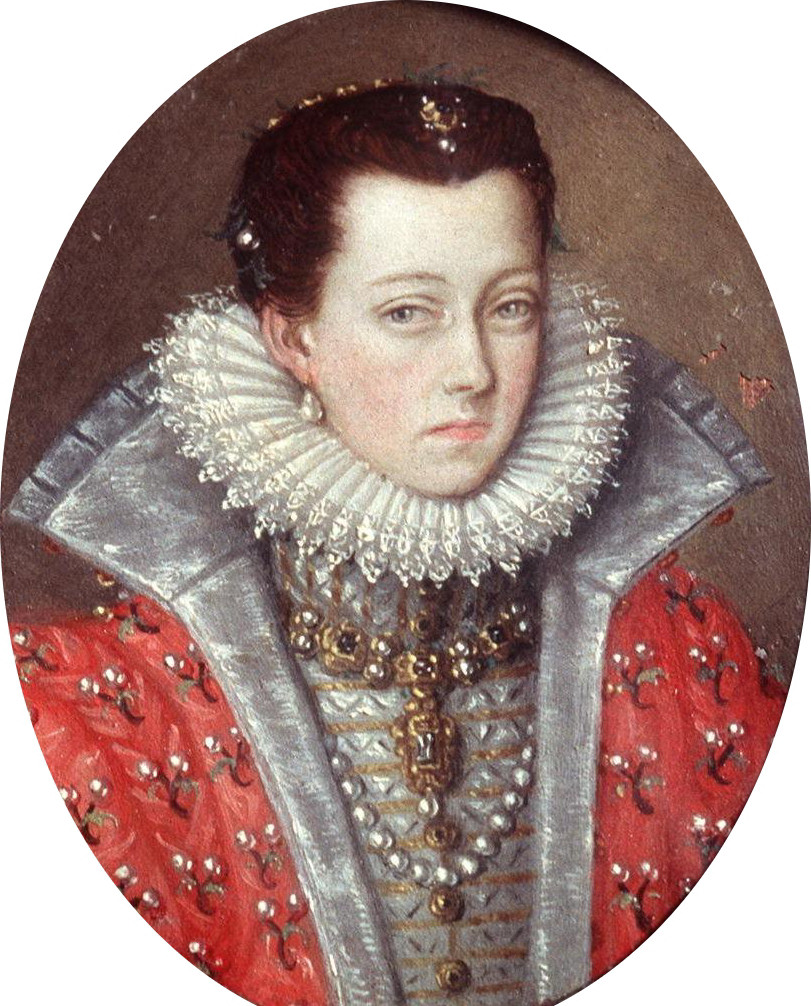
Miniature portrait of Eleanor de' Medici, Uffizi, Firenze, attributed to Costantino de' Servi

Primarily a sculptor and Medicean architect, de' Servi was also a painter and had some training in the workshop of Santi di Tito. A surviving painting, Virgin and Child was shown at the Cleveland Museum of Art. A round tondo on panel, the painting was completed around 1599. It was gifted to Cleveland Museum by Mr. and Mrs. Preston H. Saunders in 1971 and sold in 2011.

A portrait of Costantino de' Servi was engraved by Lucas Kilian in 1606.

He travelled constantly, in 1609 to obtain jasper and lapis lazuli stones for the Ducal Opificio delle pietre dure in Florence, and he worked at the court of James I in London, for Rudolph II in Prague, in Persia, and at the Schloss Weimar.

=== Henry Frederick, Prince of Wales ===
Costantino de' Servi made a detailed design for an Italianate garden at Richmond Palace, London, for the teenage Henry, Prince of Wales. The Prince had requested the services of a Florentine engineer, trained by Tommaso and Alessandro Francini in hydraulics, and de Servi arrived in London in May 1611. However, de' Servi is not known to have practiced hydraulic engineering with Tommaso Francini. When he arrived in London, he gained an audience with Anne of Denmark and offered to paint her portrait and the portrait of Jane Drummond, a leading courtier.

De' Servi planned an oval arena for events and a giant statue of Neptune for the gardens in the area between Richmond Palace and the River Thames. His drawing for the Richmond garden survives in Florence at the Archivio di Stato di Firenze and was rediscovered by the historian Sabine Eiche. She noticed the scale provided was in English feet.

Some works for the water features and river bank at Richmond were commenced by Inigo Jones and Salomon de Caus and incorporated in de' Servi's proposals. Henry's death in 1612 from typhoid ended the project.

At that politically sensitive time, de' Servi had stepped in as matchmaker, providing a likeness of Caterina, whom the Medicis wanted the Prince to marry, but would not supply her portrait.

=== Masques at the English court ===
Like many of his contemporaries, de' Servi also designed masques for the Stuart court. He used drawings for costumes and scenery made for the masques of the Medici court as an inspiration for entertainments produced by Prince Henry. His design for a stage cloud for The Somerset Masque by Thomas Campion, performed on 26 December 1613 at Whitehall Palace, was a disappointment as the rope and pulleys were visible and it was noisy in operation. Some observers thought it sounded like the portcullis of a castle. According to Giovanni Battista Gabaleoni, a diplomat from Savoy, the ropes were visible and the noise was like that made when ship's masts are raised or lowered.

Antimo Galli, an Italian poet attached to Florentine embassy, who had published a poem describing such masquing courtiers as Jane Drummond, sent an unfavourable review of The Somerset Masque or Masque of Squires to Florence. He wrote that de' Servi's "perspectives" would gain him little honour, and the Italian designer had been hunted or "chased from the court with sticks".

Thomas Campion published the masque in 1614, as The Description of a Masque, Presented in the Banqueting Roome at Whitehall, on St Stephens Night Last: At the Mariage of the Right Honourable the Earle of Somerset, & the Right Noble the Lady Frances Howard. He included criticism of de' Servi, as a difficult and secretive collaborator, "the workmanship whereof was undertaken by M. Constantine, an Italian, Architect to our late Prince Henry: but he being too much of himselfe, and no way to be drawne to impart his intentions, fayled so farre in the assurance he gave, that the mayne invention even at the last cast, was of force drawne into a farre narrower compasse then was from the beginning intended".

== Spy ==
More recent research conducted by Davide Martino, a history student at St John's College at Cambridge, suggests that Costantino de' Servi might have actually been a spy employed by the powerful Medici family of Florence. The thesis is based on the fact that the artist traveled constantly for work, was constantly by the Medici, and completed few projects. Only a spare few samples of his completed work survive today. There are also no portraits of him.

== Retirement ==
The architect ended up quietly, back in Italy, wealthy, in a grand house and garden of his own design., dying in 1622, aged 68.
