= For the Honour of Wales =

For the Honour of Wales was a masque written by Ben Jonson and first performed on 17 February 1618. It was written in honour of Charles Stuart, Prince of Wales.

Jonson's previous work, Pleasure Reconciled to Virtue, had been written to celebrate Charles's investiture as Prince of Wales in 1616, but the prince's father, King James I of England, had made no secret of the fact that he found it tedious. Jonson responded with this more entertaining work, which included comic scenes featuring stereotypical Welshmen. He drew on William Camden's Britannia for his source material, as he had done for earlier works.

A 1618 bill for yellow masque costumes for Mr Carre, Mr Abercromby, and Mr Auchmouty, each costing £55, relates to this performance. In the masque, the surnames of these courtiers were attributed fictitious Welsh etymologies.
