= Edward Hart (goldsmith) =

Edward Hart or Hairt was a Scottish goldsmith based in Edinburgh.

In 1575 the goldsmiths Michael Gilbert and George Heriot petitioned the ruler of Scotland Regent Morton in opposition Edward Hart, who claimed he should be a master goldsmith despite not meeting the criteria of the craft. Morton was persuaded to support the "liberty" of the craft incorporation, and soon after Hart accepted that he should make a "masterpiece", as was required of other aspiring master goldsmiths, in the workshop of Heriot or William Cok. Hart was made a master of the goldsmith craft on 22 December 1575.

Hart contributed to a gift for James VI from the burgh of Edinburgh. James VI had been living at Stirling Castle, and towards the end of 1579 he was proclaimed an adult ruler and made a formal Entry to Edinburgh. As a gift to him, the town council commissioned a cupboard of silver plate from the goldsmiths Edward Hart, Thomas Annand, George Heriot, Adam Craig, and William Cokky.

In January 1580 and 1581 Hart was repaid money he had advanced for work on the cupboard of silver.

He was Deacon of the goldsmiths in 1583.

Edward Hart married Christine Mowbray. After his death she married Alexander Wilsoun.
