= The Irish Masque at Court =

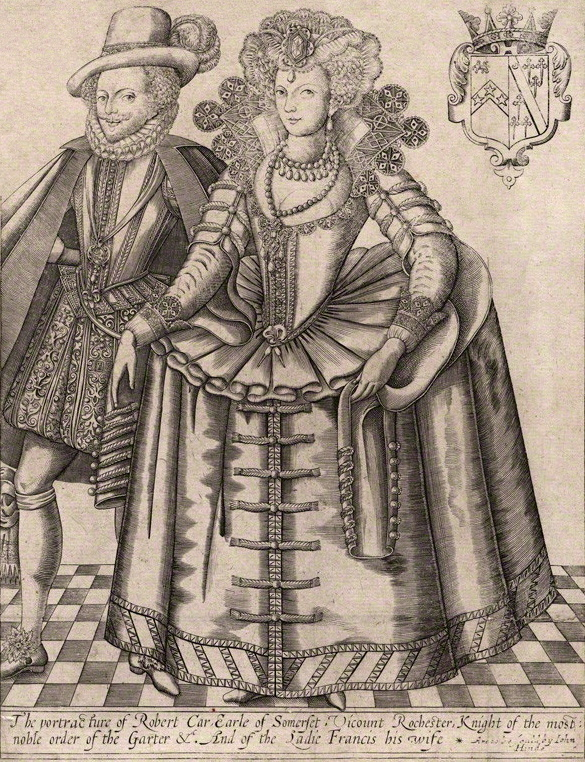
The Earl and Countess of Somerset, by Renold Elstracke

The Irish Masque at Court by Ben Jonson was an entertainment performed on 29 January 1613 in the Great Hall of Whitehall Palace as part of the celebrations of the wedding of Frances Howard and the royal favourite Robert Carr, 1st Earl of Somerset. King James VI and I commanded a repeat performance on 10 January, although the portrayal of Irish people and their speech and accent by Scottish and English courtiers was controversial. The theme of the masque may reflect recent events in Ireland; the Plantation of Ulster, the failure to convene an Irish parliament, and the subsequent reception in London by King James of Irish Catholic delegates.

== Summary ==
News reaches Ireland that the great man and courtier "Robyne" is to be married. The best Irish dancers and their twelve footmen decide to come to court to dance at the celebrations.

At court, they first dance in their Irish mantles, to the music of harps, having lost their best clothes crossing the wild Irish seas. The audience would recognise this as a parody of the twelve bewitched sea-faring knights of Thomas Campion's The Somerset Masque performed earlier in the week. Jonson also lampoons the recurrent use and symbolism of the number four in Campion's masque.

A character Dennise, a footman born in the English Pale, explains their resolve to continue to dance, in an Irish accent as printed in 1616:

"And vill leap ash light, be Creesh save me, ash he tat veares te biggest fether in ty Court, King Yamish"

(And we'll leap as light, by Christ save me, as he that wears the biggest feather in thy court, King James)

Their Irish dance is described as a "fading", elsewhere defined as a "fine Jigge". After an Irish bard sings, they drop their mantles to reveal that King James has clothed them in masque apparel, and they now dance as "new born creatures". They are transformed by dance from aliens to royal subjects.

== The high dancers ==
Two letters of John Chamberlain mention the masque, he had heard that it was a "medley masque" of five English dancers and five Scots, "high dancers, among whom Sergeant Boyd, one Abercrombie, and Auchmouty, that were at Padua and Venice, are esteemed the most Principal and lofty". As the records of court masques only give the surnames of these dancers, their exact identities are at best tentative. Chamberlain's remark also alludes to an Italian origin for the form of the dance.

"Sergeant Boyd" has been identified as an Andrew Boyde, who later received a royal gift of £500, or as James Bowie, Sergeant of the Wine Cellar and son of Jerome Bowie, and an intimate servant of King James, who performed in News from the New World Discovered in the Moon (1620), Pan's Anniversary (1620), The Masque of Augurs (1622), Time Vindicated to Himself and to His Honours, and The Fortunate Isles and Their Union.
