= Nicol Uddert =

Scottish merchant

Nicol Uddert or Udward or Udwart or Anglicised as Nicol Edward (c. 1550 – c. 1610) was a 16th century Scottish merchant who served as Provost of Edinburgh in 1592/93.

== Life ==
He was a son of Thomas Uddert. In July 1567, Michael Gilbert, Robert Abercromby, and Uddert were sent as Edinburgh's commissioners to the coronation of James VI at Stirling. Nicol Uddert worked for Regent Moray and in October 1568 came to York to serve him during the conference about Mary, Queen of Scots, and the casket letters.

He was elected Provost of Edinburgh in 1592 in succession to William Little of Liberton. He was succeeded in 1593 by Alexander Home of North Berwick.

During his period as Provost he hosted King James VI and his queen at his house. The king stayed in January 1591 and February 1592.

== House in Niddry's Wynd ==
His magnificent house, built as a "civic palace" and described as new in 1589, is said to have been one of the grandest in Edinburgh and stood on Niddry's Close midway along the Royal Mile on its south side. It passed to Lockhart of Carnwarth in the late 17th century, at which point the Earl of Mar lived opposite. It was demolished in 1780 to build South Bridge.

On 29 May 1589 the town council, at the request of James VI organised a banquet for ambassadors from towns in Holland in Uddert's new house. The English veteran sailor George Beeston brought a fleet to Scotland. On 5 June some of his crew came ashore into Edinburgh. Three got in fight in a tavern, one was stabbed, and after this they were attacked by a group of Spanish sailors, shipwrecked survivors of the Spanish Armada, and the English trumpet officer was killed. Beeston and the English ambassador William Ashby had an audience with James VI. The king gave Beeston a locket set with diamonds and 100 gold crowns to his captains. James VI requested that Edinburgh town council give him, his three captains, and the English ambassador and their courtier escorts an "honest banquet" in Nicol Uddert's "new house at house at dinner time." The banquets were organised by William Fairlie.

There was a scheme for Flemish cloth workers, weavers and walkers from the low countries, to come to Edinburgh and set up businesses or work for Nicol Uddert. The Parliament of Scotland noted in 1594 that nothing had happened and withdrew a tax exemption granted to Uddert to help the scheme.

== Family ==
Nicol Uddert married Jonet Gilbert, a daughter of the goldsmith Michael Gilbert. Nicol was the father of Nathaniel Udwart. He also had a son, Nicol, Dean of Guild in Edinburgh, whose daughter Margaret married Alexander Ellis of Mortonhall.

He is thought to be father of Alexander Udwart, a burgess in Edinburgh in 1597.
