= Robert Abercromby (saddler) =

Scottish leatherworker

Robert Abercromby or Abircrumby was a Scottish leatherworker serving the Scottish monarchy in the 16th century.

== Career ==
Abercromby and his family made saddles and horseriding equipment for the royal family. He was an Edinburgh burgess and lived in a tenement on the Royal Mile known as the Black Turnpike.

In September 1561 Abercromby made saddles and foot mantles for the queen and for her 12 ladies in waiting. The saddles were covered in black cloth by the stable master Arthur Erskine of Blackgrange as part of the mourning for Mary's first husband Francis II of France. In September 1565 Mary, Queen of Scots and Lord Darnley ordered cover cloths for horses of red and yellow cloth, and a leather saddle cover for Lord Darnley. In July 1567 she ordered a foot mantle from Abercromby, to be made with black velvet with gold fringes and gilt buckles. He was also paid for goods delivered to her master stablers.

Abercromby was appointed saddler to Prince James in January 1567, with an allowance for livery clothes including black cloth, velvet, stemming, taffeta, and a hat to be delivered every Yule.

In July 1567, Michael Gilbert, Nicol Edward, and Abercromby were sent as Edinburgh's commissioners to the coronation of James VI at Stirling. His wife sold Holland linen cloth for the use of James VI at Stirling Castle in September 1567.

An account for saddler work for Agnes Keith, Countess of Moray in 1568 was probably from Abercromby; it includes covering stools with leather, mending saddles, and making dog collars.

He supplied three velvet foot mantles to James VI in 1579. He was also involved in the book trade, and lost a parcel of books sent by sea from London in 1583.

In September 1589 he was chosen by Edinburgh burgh council to be the craft representative and be one of the two teams of six men carry the canopy or "paill" over Anne of Denmark at her Entry and coronation. In June 1591, he made an incarnate red taffeta caparison for the king's horse, possibly for a masque at Tullibardine Castle.

== Abraham Abercromby ==
His son, or nephew, Abraham Abercromby, was involved in a court case involving James Rigg and Mungo Rigg of Carberry. The Riggs went to law over the purchase a ship called the Angel and its cargo of Norwegian timber by Harry Watson, a Scotsman based in Bergen. Abercromby claimed Watson had not paid.

Abraham Abercromby repaired Anne of Denmark's litter when Prince Charles was brought from Dunfermline Palace to Holyrood Palace for a time in 1600, and made four saddles sent with gift horses to France with the Master Hunter Thomas Pott. He was saddler to Prince Henry in England, and later to Charles I. He was naturalized as a denizen of England on 26 May 1608.

== Abercromby the masquer ==
A Mr Abercromby took part in court masques, and this man is often said to have been a saddler. The masques included Ben Jonson's For the Honour of Wales, Love Restored, and The Irish Masque. John Chamberlain described Abercromby and John or James Auchmoutie as "high dancers", and Robert Sidney, Viscount Lisle called them the "choicest dancers". John Auchmoutie was not an aristocrat, but he was a Scottish laird and a groom of the bedchamber. He was keeper of the royal wardrobe in Scotland.

== Patrick Abercromby ==
Patrick Abercromby travelled to Heidelberg in April 1613 with Princess Elizabeth after her marriage to Frederick V of the Palatinate, ranked with James Auchmoutie, a brother of John Auchmoutie. With Sir John Sandilands, he was given a free gift of £100 in 1614.

== Abercromby of the queen's wardrobe ==
Sir George Abercromby was an officer of the wardrobe of Anne of Denmark in England, probably in succession to David Abercromby who died in 1609. Their role in the household included making payments to the goldsmith George Heriot for the queen's jewels. David Abercromby's will mentions that in June 1609 Jean Drummond and Lady Fleetwood stayed at his bedside and declared his will to them. He was related to Jean Drummond. George Abercromby pawned the queen's jewels with Rebecca Romney. He was granted an annual pension of £80 in March 1612. He may have been the masque dancer. He was made a denizen of England in 1624.
