= Entry of James VI into Edinburgh =

1579 coming of age ceremony

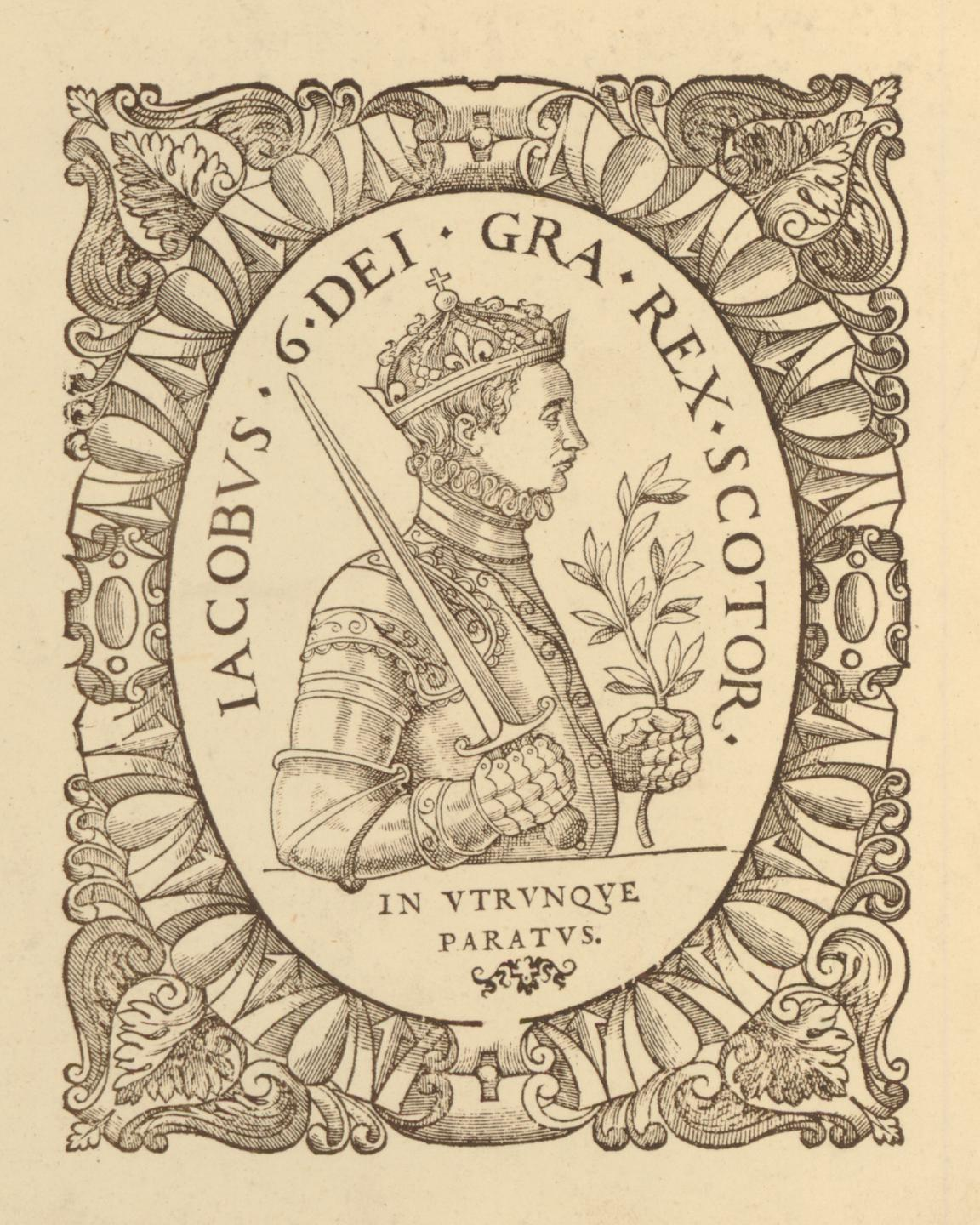
James VI of Scotland in 1580

A royal entry into Edinburgh marked the coming of age of King James VI of Scotland as an adult ruler on 19 October 1579. The 13-year-old king came to Edinburgh to begin his adult rule, having spent his childhood at Stirling Castle.

A royal entry was the usual way across Europe of marking a new monarch, or one making his first visit to a city. A representation of the astrologer Ptolemy signalled the transition of James to adulthood, and he was given a sword and sceptre, symbols of kingship, known as the Honours of Scotland.

== Events ==
According to David Moysie, James VI left Stirling on 29 September 1579 despite a storm. He had lunch at Dunipace and dinner at Linlithgow Palace where he stayed the night, and came to Holyroodhouse the next evening. The town lined the road with men in armour and a salute was fired from Edinburgh Castle.

James arrived from Dalkeith Palace. The processional route went from the West Port, to the Overbow, to the Tolbooth, to St Giles Kirk, the Mercat Cross, the Salt Tron, the Nether Bow, Canongate Cross, and Holyrood Palace. The gates of the town, the tolbooths of Edinburgh and the Canongate, and other buildings were painted white with limewash, called "calk". Householders along the route were asked to hang the external stairs with tapestry and "Arras works".

At the West Port the king was met by 32 burgesses of Edinburgh, whose names are recorded, who carried a canopy made of purple velvet. John Shairp gave a speech in Latin. There was a tableau vivant of the Judgement of Solomon. At the Overbow Cupid gave James the keys to the town. Cupid was played by a boy who descended in a globe. At the Tolbooth four maidens (probably played by boys) represented Peace, Justice, Plenty and Policy, a scene relating to the four Cardinal Virtues. At St Giles, Dame Religion invited the king to hear a sermon on the duty of kings and Psalm 21 was sung. Afterwards, at the Mercat Cross Bacchus shared out wine. At the Salt Tron the genealogy of the Scottish monarchy was presented, perhaps using portraits. The king's horoscope was described by an actor playing Ptolemy at the Netherbow Port. At the Canongate Cross a scene represented the abolition of the Pope's authority in Scotland.

At Holyrood Palace a new lodging was prepared for the king's favourite Esmé Stewart next to the royal apartment. A course or tournament ground made of sand for "running at the ring" was laid at Holyroodhouse. Celebrations continued at Dalkeith Palace, hosted by the former Regent Morton.

== The account of the event in Scots ==
A short account of the events occurs in the chronicle, The historie and life of King James the Sext, written in Middle Scots.

At the Wast Port of Edinburgh, he was ressavit be the Magistrats of the toun under a pompous payle of purple velvet. That port presentit unto him the wisdome of Solomon, as it is written in the thrid chapter of the first buik of the Kings : That is to say King Solomon was representit with the tua wemen that contendit for the young chylde. This done, they presented unto the King, the sworde for the one hand, and the scepter for the uther.
And as he maid forder progres within the toun, in the streat that ascendis to the castell, thair is an ancient port, at the whilk hang a curious globe, that opnit artificiallie as the King came by, wharin was a young boy that discendit craftelie, presenting the keyis of the toun to his Majestie, that war all maid of fyne massie sylver; and thais war presentlie ressavit be ane of his honorable counsall at his awin command. During this space, Dame Music and hir scollars exercesit hir art with great melodic. Then in his discence, as he came foment the hous of Justice, thair shew thayme selfis unto him, foure gallant vertewous ladeyis; to wit, Peax, Justice, Plentie, and Policie; and ather of thayme had an oraison to his Majestic.
Tharefter, as he came towart the chief collegiall kirk, thare Dame Religion shew hirself, desyring his presence, whilk he then obeyit be entring the kirk; whare the cheif preacher for that tyme maid a notable exhortation unto him, for the embracing of Religion and all hir cardinall vertewis, and of all uther morall vertewis. Tharefter, he came furth and maid progres to the Mercat Croce, whare he beheld Bacchus with his magnifik liberalitie and plentie, distributing of his liquor to all passingers and behalders, in sik apperance as was pleasant to see. A litill beneth is a mercat place of salt, wharupon was payntit the genealogie of the Kings of Scotland, and a nomber of trumpets sounding melodioslie, and crying with loud voyce, "Wealfayre to the King".
At the east port was erectit the conjunctioun of the planets, as thay war in thair degreis and places the tyme of his Majesteis happie nativitie, and the same vivelie representit be the assistance of King Ptolome : And withall, the haill streits war spred with flowres; and the forehowsis of the streits, be the whilks the King passit, war all hung with magnifik tapestrie, with payntit historeis, and with the effegeis of noble men and wemen : And thus he past owt of the toun of Edinburgh to his palice of Halyruidhous.

== The silver cupboard ==
The king was given a cupboard of silver gilt plate made by the Edinburgh goldsmiths Edward Hart, Thomas Annand, George Heriot, Adam Craig and William Cokky. It was valued at 1000 English marks. This included a basin and a laver, two flasks, six cups and covers, four candle holders, a salt, a silver salver, and dozen silver plates.

William Fairlie was asked to oversee the gilding of the silver on 8 October and assist Henry Nesbit make an account of the expenses. The wealthy merchant and "Customar" of Edinburgh Robert Gourlay, a supporter of Regent Morton, complained to the Privy Council of Scotland when he was asked to contribute £30.

== Repairs to Holyrood Palace ==
An account for repairs and building work at Holyrood Palace in August and September 1579 survives. The works were supervised by William MacDowall, the Master of Works to the Scottish Crown. Mention is made of slating the roof of a "Dancing House", glazing the chamber for "Lord Lennox", carpenters who made a great chest for the king's pantry, and a pavement in the chapel. New rooms were made for William Murray, and for Jerome Bowie, Master of the Wine Cellar. George Wallace or Vallance and his workman plastered the old hall, the chapel and the gallery, and painted the council house with chalk distemper paint. Women worked cleaning chambers in the tower, the old hall, the forework, and the gallery, and the inner close or courtyard.
