= Coronation of James VI =

1567 coronation in Scotland

- Date: 29 July 1567; 459 years ago
- Venue: Church of the Holy Rude
- Location: Stirling, Scotland
- Type: Royal coronation
- Participants: James VI, various dignitaries and guests

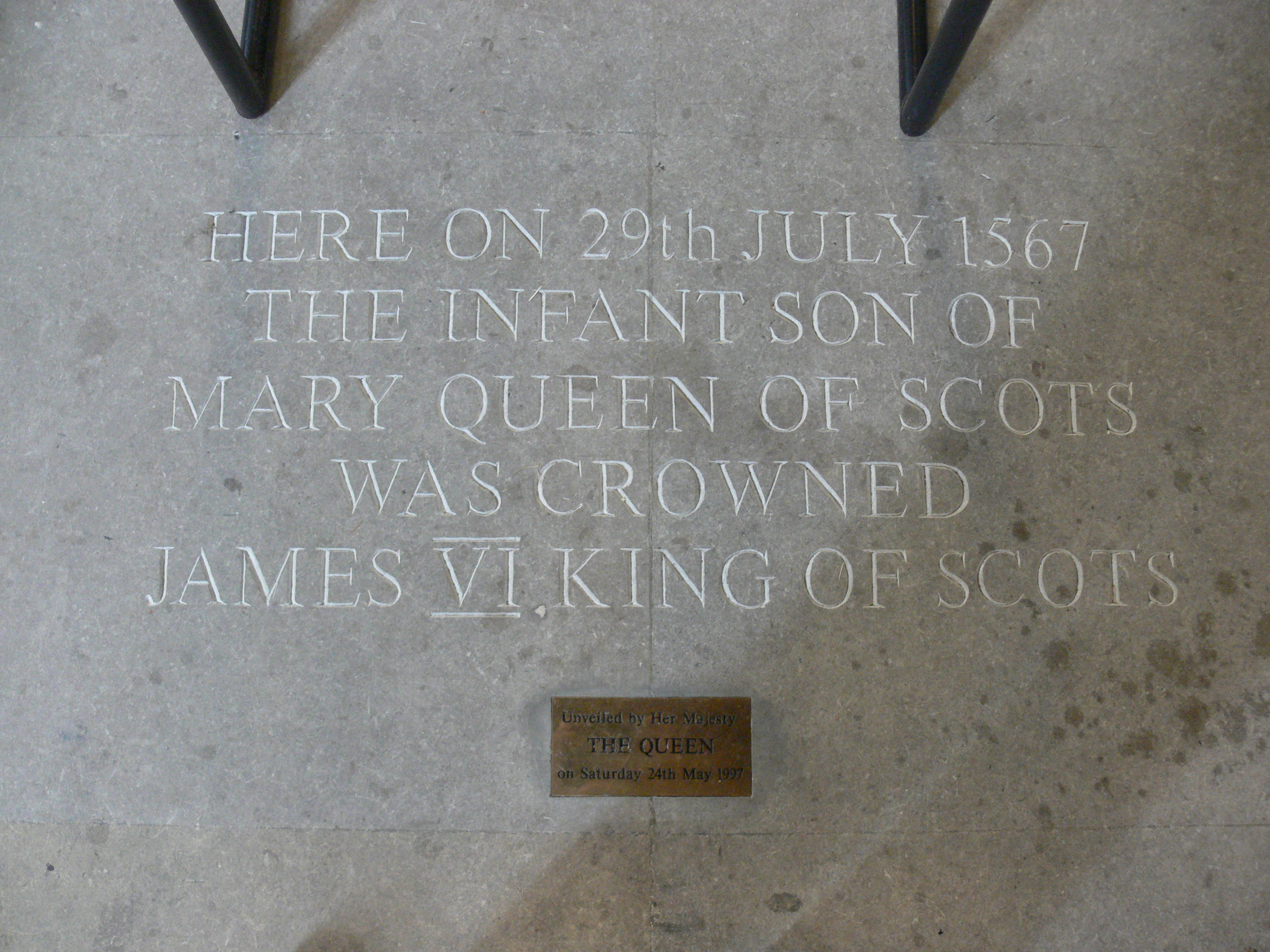
Commemorative stone in the Church of the Holy Rude

James VI (1566–1625), son of Mary, Queen of Scots (1542–1587) and Lord Darnley (1546–1567), was crowned King of Scotland by Adam Bothwell, Bishop of Orkney, in the Holy Rude Kirk at Stirling on 29 July 1567. The king was just over one year old.

== Abdication of Mary, Queen of Scots ==
Mary, Queen of Scots was imprisoned in the island castle of Lochleven following her surrender at the Battle of Carberry Hill. On 24 July she was forced to sign abdication papers in favour of her son. Patrick, Lord Lindsay of the Byres brought the signed documents to a meeting of the Privy Council and others in Edinburgh. Mary's statement narrated that she was "weary of the great pains" taken in her government of the realm.

Mary's keeper at Lochleven, William Douglas, had a legal paper drawn up on 28 July 1567, which stated that he was not present when the Queen signed this "demission" of the crown and did not know of it, and had offered to convey her to Stirling Castle for her son's coronation, which offer she refused.

== Preparations ==
On 26 July messengers were sent to Scotland's burgh towns to announce the coronation and robes were ordered for the infant king. 62 nobles and 13 commissioners for towns signed a band or contract pledging support for James as king, and to defend the Scottish Reformation. Edinburgh's commissioners were Michael Gilbert, Nicol Edward, and Robert Abercromby.

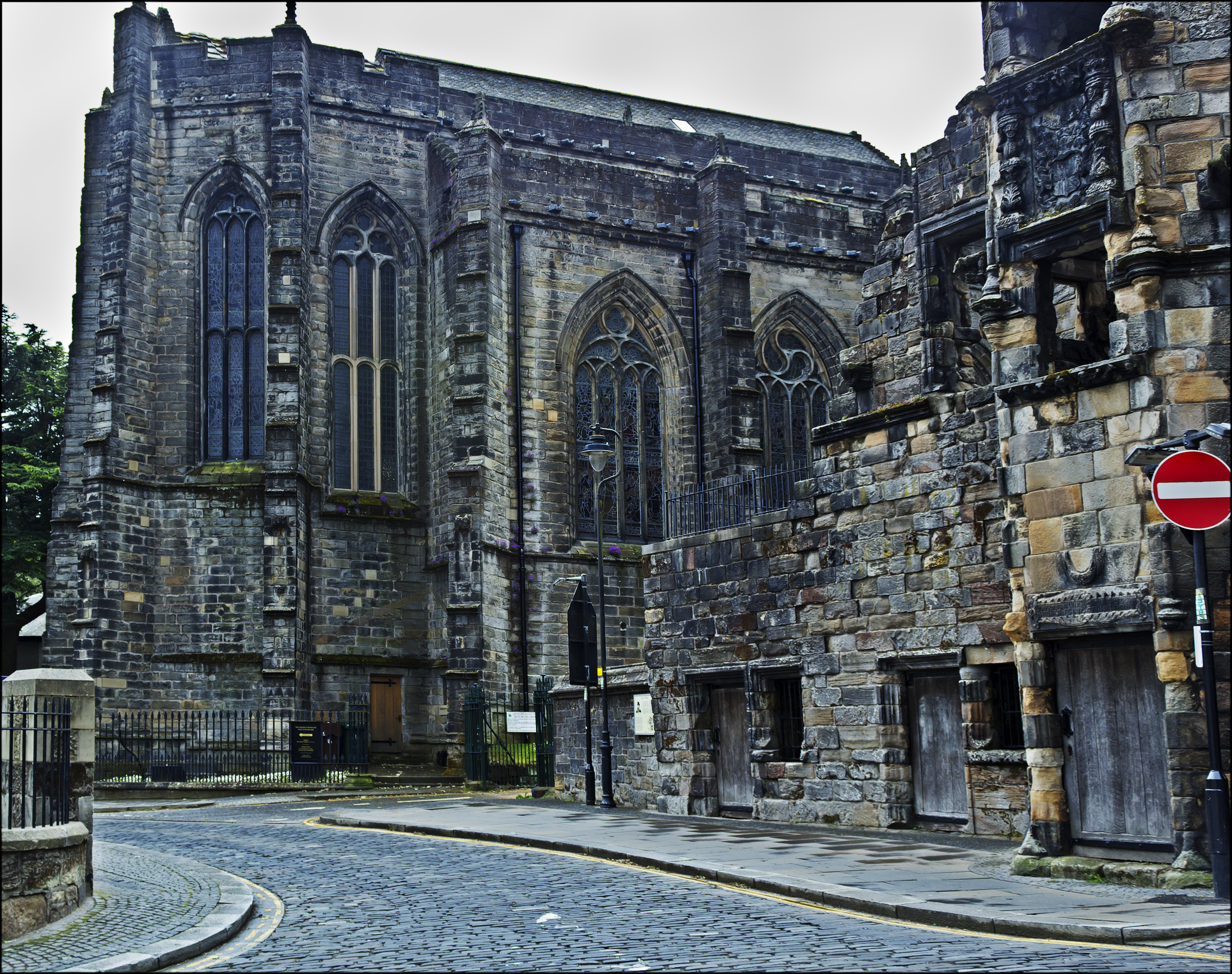
Church of the Holy Rude and Mar's Wark

The Privy Council asserted their commitment to justice and vengeance against the Earl of Bothwell for the murder of Lord Darnley by sending the dismembered body parts of his henchman William Blackadder for display at Stirling, Glasgow, Perth, and Dundee.

The Scottish lords and Privy Council travelled to Stirling on 27 July bringing the crown, sceptre, and sword, known as the Honours of Scotland, from Edinburgh Castle.

James Melville of Halhill was sent to Hamilton to invite the Archbishop of St Andrews and Abbot of Arbroath. They did not come to Stirling, but sent their delegate Arthur Hamilton of Merritoun to make a statement of the rights of James Hamilton, Duke of Châtellerault and the Hamilton family to the crown of Scotland.

== Coronation ==
Annabell Murray, Countess of Mar brought Prince James down from the castle to the Holy Rude Kirk on the afternoon of 29 July for the three-hour ceremony. His mother had been crowned at 9 months of age in the chapel in Stirling Castle on 9 September 1543.

At the start of the proceedings in the church, the herald Robert Forman of Luthrie proclaimed the royal titles. Lord Lindsay and Lord Ruthven declared on oath that Mary had "resigned willingly without compulsion." The Earl of Atholl carried the crown of honour, the Earl of Morton, the sceptre, and the Earl of Glencairn carried the sword of honour. Morton pronounced the coronation oath on behalf of James, the traditional ending of the Scottish coronation service.

John Knox gave a sermon on the crowning of King Joash after the palace coup that ousted Queen Athaliah. The theme includes the removal of altars and images during the destruction of the temple of Baal. James was anointed with oil. Accounts of the ceremony mention that next Adam Bothwell, Bishop of Orkney, anointed the king and the Earl of Atholl placed the crown on his head, and "the sword and sceptre on each hand, with all the accustomed ceremonies". The Earl of Mar carried the 13-month-old king back to Stirling Castle. Two superintendents of the Scottish kirk, John Spottiswood and John Erskine of Dun assisted in the service and crowning ceremony.

The English ambassador, Nicolas Throckmorton, refused to attend "as these accidents were chanced, and these matters concluded" contrary to Elizabeth's advice and wishes, but he sent his aide and cousin Henry Middlemore to Stirling. Throckmorton wrote up Middlemore's account of the ceremony and sent it to Elizabeth I:

my cowsen Henrye Myddlemore retorned from Sterlynge to thys Towne, by whom I understand thynges have passed at Sterlynge as ensueth: The 29th day of July ... the yonge Prince was crowned in the great Churche of Sterlyng by the Bisshop of Orkneye ... Mr Knox preached and tooke a place of the Scrypture forthe of the bookes of the Kynges where Joas was crowned verye yonge to treate on. Some ceremonyes accustomablye used at the Coronation of their Princes were omytted, and many retayned. Th'oath usually to be mynistered to the Kynge this realme at his coronation was taken by the Earl of Morton and the Laird of Dun on the Prynces behalfe.

When Morton surrendered the regency of Scotland in 1578, he wrote a memorandum detailing his services to King James, noting "I swoir his ath of coronation".

The coronation robes of crimson and blue velvet were made by James Inglis. The fur trim was provided by Archibald Leche. Three trumpeters, James Savoy, James Weddell, and Ramsay performed at the ceremony. The Lord Lyon and other heralds attended. Messengers were sent to the burghs to proclaim the king. Edinburgh burgh council ordered bonfires in celebration, and inhabitants who failed to contribute were fined.

A few days after the coronation, Throckmorton learned that Mary was now confined to more securely guarded lodgings in a tower at Lochleven Castle. James VI and Anne of Denmark were crowned as king and queen consort of England on 25 July 1603.

A young poet, Thomas Maitland, composed a Latin poem on the coronation, Jacobi VI Scotorum Regis Inauguratio.
