= John Auchmoutie =

Scottish courtier and performer in masques (1580–1635)

John Auchmoutie of Scoughall (floruit 1580–1635) was a Scottish courtier and officer of the royal wardrobe. He was also known as John Auchmoutie of Gosford.

== Career ==
He was groom of the bed chamber and master and keeper of the royal wardrobe in Scotland. His sister, Elizabeth Auchmoutie, was one of the nurses of Princess Elizabeth at Linlithgow Palace. He inherited Scoughall after the death of his brother Robert Auchmoutie. His mother, Margaret Gib, was buried at Auldhame Kirk in October 1637.

In July 1600 he and other young men of the royal household including Robert Ker, John Ramsay, John Murray and George Murray were bought green outfits for hunting.

Scoughall is near North Berwick. The surname was sometimes spelled "Auchmowtie" or Auchmowty" or "Acmooty".

After the Union of Crowns, Auchmoutie had a patent for dye materials. He came to Royston, where King James had a residence, in October 1606. In 1608, he received a gift of £1,200 from King James, paid from confiscations of recusant's lands. John and Alexander Auchmoutie were naturalized as denizens of England on 24 July 1610 and granted properties in Ireland.

The satirist Anthony Weldon listed Auchmoutie as a Scottish courtier who deservedly received rewards from King James, among "private gentlemen; as Gideon Murray, John Achmoty, James Baily, John Gib, and Barnard Lindley, got some pretty estate, not worth either the naming or enjoying; old servants should get some moderate estate to leave to posterity".

== John Auchmoutie and the royal wardrobe in Scotland ==
In 1613 he was ordered to go to Berwick-upon-Tweed to collect paperwork belonging to the king from Roger Widdrington and the paymaster (and former diplomat) George Nicholson.

His wife Christian Douglas died on 28 March 1615. She owned two "targets" or "hangers", lockets set with diamonds and rubies. They were owed money by Robert Hay of the bedchamber and from the estate of her father James Douglas of Spott for an annualrent from Spott. Auchmoutie owed money to his London tailor and to silkmen for satin and velvet, and to a cloth merchant. He had borrowed money from John Murray and James Bowie, sergeant of the king's wine cellar. John Auchmoutie married Isobel Seton, a daughter of Sir William Seton, in 1616. Anne Livingstone, Countess of Eglinton was a guest.

In October 1615 King James ordered John Auchmoutie to provide tapestry to Lord Erskine to furnish two rooms in Stirling Castle. In 1616, Auchmoutie packed up four royal beds and delivered them to a Mr Nicolls to be sent to England for repair. These included a bed with curtains depicting the Labours of Hercules, a bed with crimson velvet curtains, a bed with gold silver embroidered curtains, and one embroidered by Mary, Queen of Scots. The beds were to be mended and returned to the Scottish royal palaces for the forthcoming visit of King James.

John Auchmoutie was England when his daughter was christened Isobel in 1617. In 1618 the London poet and boat-man John Taylor came to Scotland and met Auchmoutie at Burntisland, with other courtiers. After going north to Braemar, Taylor visited Auchmoutie and his brothers James and Alexander at Auldhame (Scoughall) with James Achesoun of Gosford. They ate the local Solan goose from the Bass Rock served as a special dish at a separate table from dinner, and washed down with Spanish sack, in the manner that oysters were then usually served.

In June 1621 an Edinburgh merchant John Murray of Romanno was ordered by the Privy Council to deliver furnishings belonging to the king to Auchmoutie. In July 1621 Patrick Murray, the son of the recently deceased treasurer-depute Gideon Murray, returned uncut damask and Dornick linen, fabric for napkins, to Mr John Oliphant, the clerk of wardrobe, when John Auchmoutie was at court in London.

The king had instructed the treasurer, the Earl of Mar, that the Honours of Scotland should stay in Edinburgh Castle, and an inventory should be made of tapestry and silver plate in Auchmoutie's keeping. In March 1622 Mar delivered the silver plate in his keeping to Auchmoutie. The plate, which had been in the keeping of Gideon Murray, and had been provided for the royal visit in 1617, included: eight basins, eight lavers, ten salts, 96 trencher plates, 40 candlesticks, 209 plates, 20 bowls or cups, 120 spoons, and 6 six cup pedestals and covers.

In 1624 he petitioned the king for better pay for the four tapestry keepers and workers in Scotland, and the appointment of Martin Leache as a replacement for the deceased Nicolas Elmar. After the death of James VI and I, John Auchmoutie and others continued to draw salaries as grooms of his bedchamber of in Scotland. Henry Wardlaw and other officers of crown rents in Scotland were given directions to pay them.

In 1633 Charles I was crowned in Edinburgh, and Auchmoutie was involved with the royal wardrobe and the stock of table linen. He was asked to remove the ermine from the "new robe" of James VI and I and use it to line the old robe of James IV of Scotland for Charles to wear at the coronation and Parliament in Scotland.

== James or John Auchmoutie, masque dancer ==
James Auchmoutie, younger brother of John, was also a groom of the bedchamber to King James. He travelled to Heidelberg in April 1613 with Princess Elizabeth after her marriage to Frederick V of the Palatinate, ranked in the accounts with Patrick Abercromby. He accompanied King James to Scotland in 1617, and was one of several courtiers including Edward Zouch, John Wolfgang Rumler, Patrick Abercromby, and Archibald Armstrong who travelled to Aberdeen (without the king) and were made burgesses and guild-brothers.

John Chamberlain mentions an Auchmoutie (who had been in Padua and Venice) as one of the "most principal and lofty" of ten "high" dancers, five English, five Scottish, in the medley mask, The Irish Masque at Court of Ben Jonson, performed during celebrations at the wedding of Robert Carr, 1st Earl of Somerset and Frances Howard in December 1613. He had been in Padua and Venice. Auchmoutie performed in the masque For the Honour of Wales by Ben Jonson first performed on 17 February 1618. A 1618 bill for yellow masque costumes for "Mr Carre, Mr Abercromby, and Mr Auchmouty", each costing £55, relates to this performance. A note by Tobie Matthew adds the detail that "Mr Crommy" (Patrick Abercromby) was paired in the dance with "Mr Acmooty". It is not certain if the "Mr Auchmoutie" of these records was John or James.

In January 1619 the Banqueting House at Whitehall Palace was burnt down during preparations for a masque. The masque was staged at Shrovetide in the Great Hall. The twelve masquers included Prince Charles, Buckingham, the Earl of Montgomerie, the Captain of the Guards and his brother, Sir Thomas Howard, Maynard, Abercromby, and Auchmoutie, and others.
