= Thomas Annand =

Scottish goldsmith based in Edinburgh (died 1591)

Thomas Annand (died 1591) was a Scottish goldsmith based in Edinburgh.

One of his earliest recorded works was a contribution to a gift for James VI from the burgh of Edinburgh. James VI had been living at Stirling Castle, and towards the end of 1579 he was proclaimed an adult ruler and made a formal Entry to Edinburgh. As a gift to him, the town council commissioned a cupboard of silver plate from the goldsmiths Edward Hart, Thomas Annand, George Heriot, Adam Craig, and William Cokky.

In 1589 he worked with another goldsmith, Hew Lindsay, to supply silver gilt platters worth £1500 Scots for John Maitland of Thirlestane.

He died in Dundee on 6 August 1591. The goldsmith and financier Thomas Foulis owed him £1374-13s-4d. Scots.

He married Grissell Finlayson, their children were James and Katherine. In December 1591 Edinburgh burgh council allowed "Grissell Fynlawsoun" to continue to rent her husband's goldsmith's booth or shop located under the Old Tolbooth on Edinburgh's Royal Mile. These retail units were known as Luckenbooths.

In January 1600 Grissell Finlayson complained to the Privy Council about money owed to her by Adam Bellenden. She had arranged for him to be arrested in Canongate twice for not paying back a loan, but he had escaped with the help of a crowd of friends and relatives.
