= George Heriot (Edinburgh MP) =

- Born: 1539/40
- Died: 1610
- Occupations: Goldsmith commissioner to parliament from edinburgh
- Children: George Heriot

George Heriot (1539/40 – 1610) was a Scottish goldsmith and member of the Parliament of Scotland. He is perhaps best known as the father of the philanthropist George Heriot, his eldest son.

== Career ==
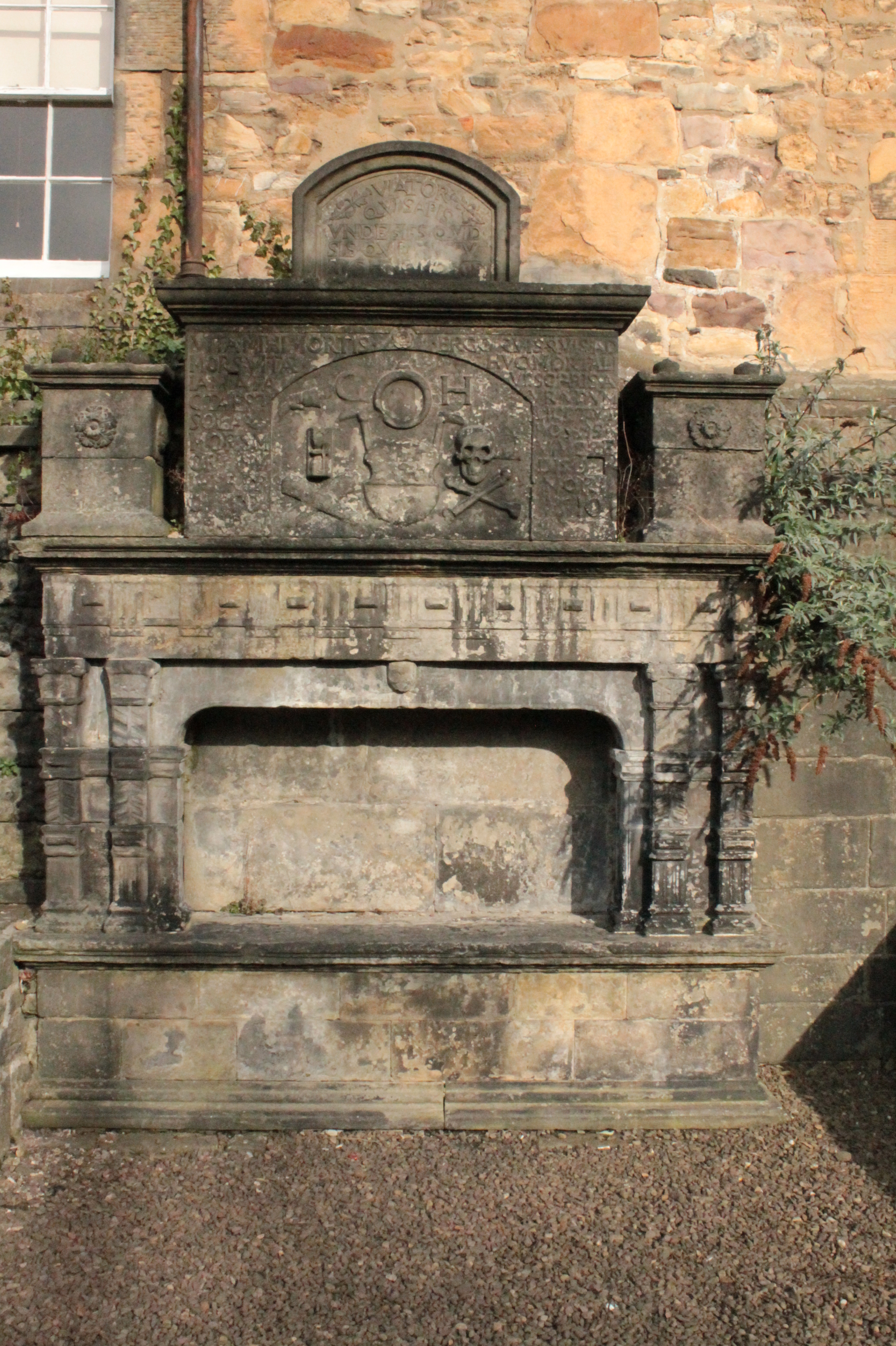
The grave of George Heriot (d.1610) Greyfriars Kirkyard

He was the son of the goldsmith George Heriot, who had moved to Edinburgh around the start of the sixteenth century, and Christian Kyle, an Edinburgh native. Heriot was a member of an established Haddingtonshire family; his grandfather, John Heriot, had been given four hundred acres of land at Trabourn by the Earl of Douglas in return for military service, which belonged to his uncle James Heriot. His father worked for James V, in October 1533 he mended a silver jug for the king.

Grant states that he lived on the Canongate rather than within the walls of Edinburgh, where he traded.

He had become a freeman of the Edinburgh Incorporation of Goldsmiths by 26 June 1561 when he was elected to be a quarter-master of the Incorporation. He became a burgess of the Edinburgh Corporation on 4 August 1562. He was elected Deacon of the Incorporation for the years 1565–67, 1575–76, 1579, 1583–85, 1586–87, 1589–91, 1594–96, 1603–04 and 1607–08 [ibid, various refs.]. He was also elected deacon-convener of the Incorporated Trades of the city on five occasions. Heriot represented the Edinburgh Corporation in the Parliament of Scotland on a number of occasions between 1585 and 1607. In 1596 he was one of the representatives from Edinburgh sent to meet with King James VI to placate him after a major riot that December which had caused the king to flee the city. In 1597 he was appointed to a commission to set the value of foreign gold and silver money brought into the country, and in 1599 to one which studied how to reissue the circulating coinage. His last parliamentary action was in 1607, when he was appointed to a commission to assess a tax for the purpose of printing Regiam Majestatem, an edition of the old laws of Scotland.

He is buried against the eastern wall of Greyfriars Kirkyard and has an elaborate monument.

== Works ==
In October 1579 at his Entry to Edinburgh, James VI was given a cupboard of silver gilt plate made by the Edinburgh goldsmiths Edward Hart, Thomas Annand, George Heriot, Adam Craig and William Cokky. It was valued at 1000 English marks. This included a basin and a laver, two flasks, six cups and covers, four candle holders, a salt, a silver salver, and dozen silver plates.

Two letters from Heriot to Sir John Maxwell of Pollok survive, itemising work the goldsmith had in hand in around the year 1570, including a gold needle and needle case, a "hinger" with a picture, gold buttons, and tooth pick. He was unable to mend Maxwell's old locket or tablet.

A set of seven spoons made by George Heriot around 1582 and hallmarked "GH" were discovered in Ayrshire in the 19th century. They are engraved with the initials of Alexander Cunningham, a son of the Earl of Glencairn, and his wife Jean Blair. The spoons are displayed at the National Museum of Scotland in Edinburgh.

== Family ==
He married Elizabeth Balderstone, his first wife, sometime before 1563; their first son, George, was born on 15 June 1563, followed by a second son Patrick and a daughter Margaret. A natural son, David, was legitimated in Edinburgh on 24 May 1593. Heriot later remarried, to Christian Blawe, with whom he had sons James and Thomas (born 1603), and four daughters, Christian, Sybilla, Janet and Marion. Christian survived him, and remarried in 1626; she was still alive in 1637. On his eldest son George's marriage in 1586, Heriot gave him 1500 merks, in order that he could establish his own shop; he would go on to become jeweller and goldsmith to Queen Anne and King James VI, and amass a large fortune, which he bequeathed to establish Heriot's Hospital in Edinburgh.

Of his other children, Patrick moved to Genoa, where he married into an Italian family and died sometime before 1623. whilst Margaret married twice. David also took up his father's business, and his son, also David, would become known as a "celebrated" goldsmith; the elder David died before 21 January 1623/4, and the younger David in 1661. James succeeded as court jeweller after his brother's death, and married Elizabeth Jossey or Joyce, the daughter of Robert Jousie, Keeper of the Robes, in January 1624/5. Christian, Janet and Marion were all married by 1623, whilst Sibylla married in 1626.
