= Scottish jewellery =

Jewellery in a style associated with or made in Scotland

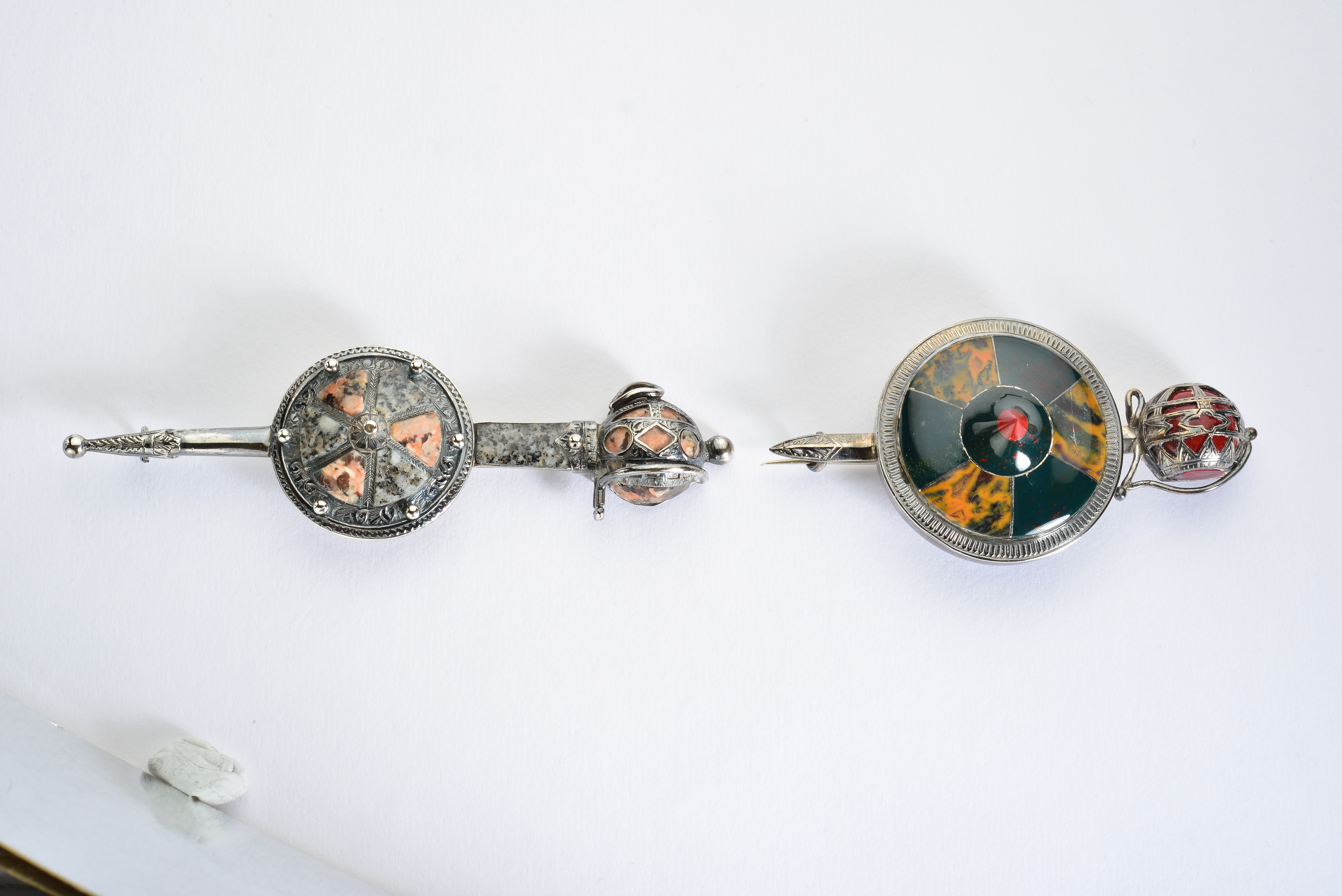
Examples of silver brooches in the form of Scottish Claymore swords with Targe shields

Scottish jewellery is jewellery created in Scotland or in a style associated with Scotland, which today often takes the form of the Celtic style. It is often characterised by being inspired by nature, Scandinavian mythology, and Celtic knot patterns. Jewellery has a history in Scotland dating back to at least the Iron Age.

== Traditional examples ==
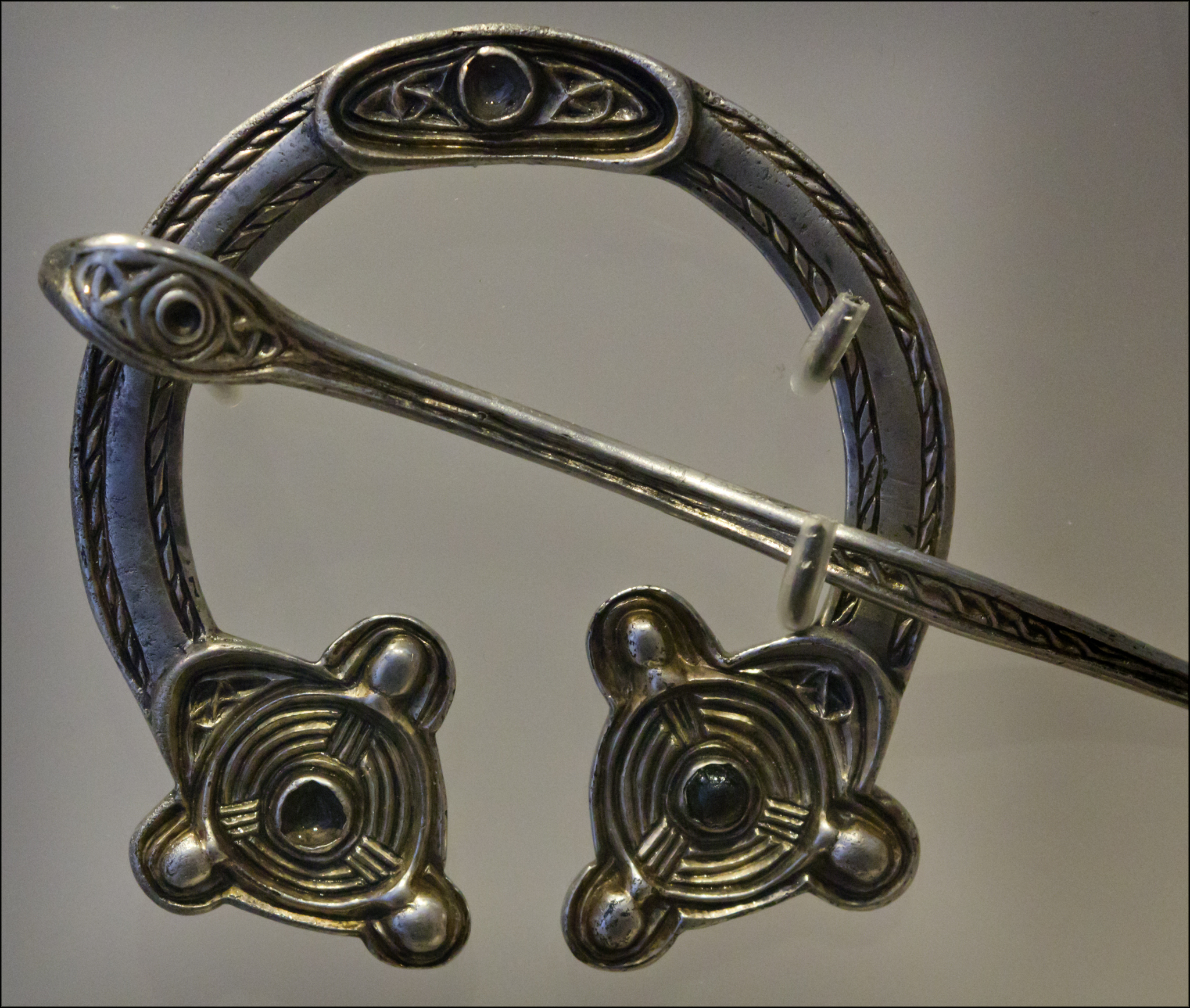
Penannular brooch from the St Ninian's Isle Treasure

Traditional examples of Scottish jewellery are often functional objects that have been decorated and over time have become jewellery items. Over time, these necessary objects took on more and more decorative appearances, and are now considered an aesthetic item that is more of an accessory.

=== Kilt pin ===
The kilt pin is a functional object that weighs down the edge of the apron of a kilt to keep it in place during movement.

=== Penannular/ Celtic brooch ===
The ring and pin style penannular brooch, also known as the Celtic or Viking brooch, had the original purpose of being a fastener for clothing. Also native to Ireland, its design was meant to mirror that of the torc. The first examples of this style of brooch date from circa 700CE. These items were first produced for the elite class out of precious metals, and over time the more simple item of the thistle brooch emerged from this tradition.

=== Thistle brooch ===
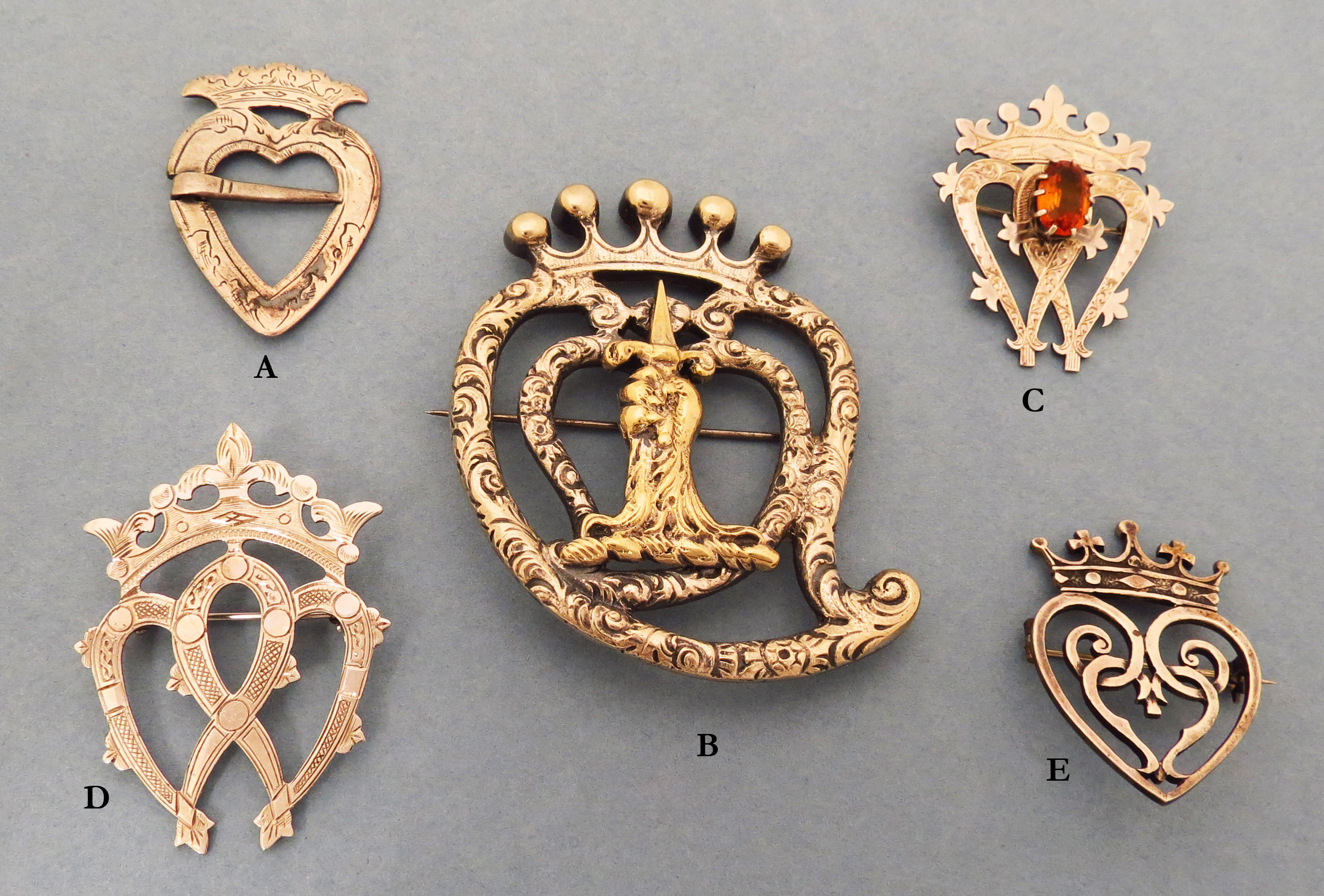
Examples of Luckenbooth brooches with varying decorative styles

The thistle brooch is a simpler version of the penannular brooch, with less surface decoration, which gained popularity around 1100. The thistle is the national flower of Scotland and acts as an emblem. Today, thistle brooches are often made of silver and contain a thistle motif, and are not necessarily a penannular brooch.

=== Luckenbooth brooch ===
The Luckenbooth brooch is a style of brooch that originated on the Royal Mile in Edinburgh. It is a kind of annular brooch that is heart shaped. It often comes in the form of two hearts woven together, with more ornate brooches also containing a crown pattern. The name Luckenbooth comes from the locked booths along the royal mile that had a similar pattern. This style first gained popularity in the 17th century, and had a revival in the 19th century in the form of pebble jewellery. They were traditionally given as a token of love or as an engagement present.

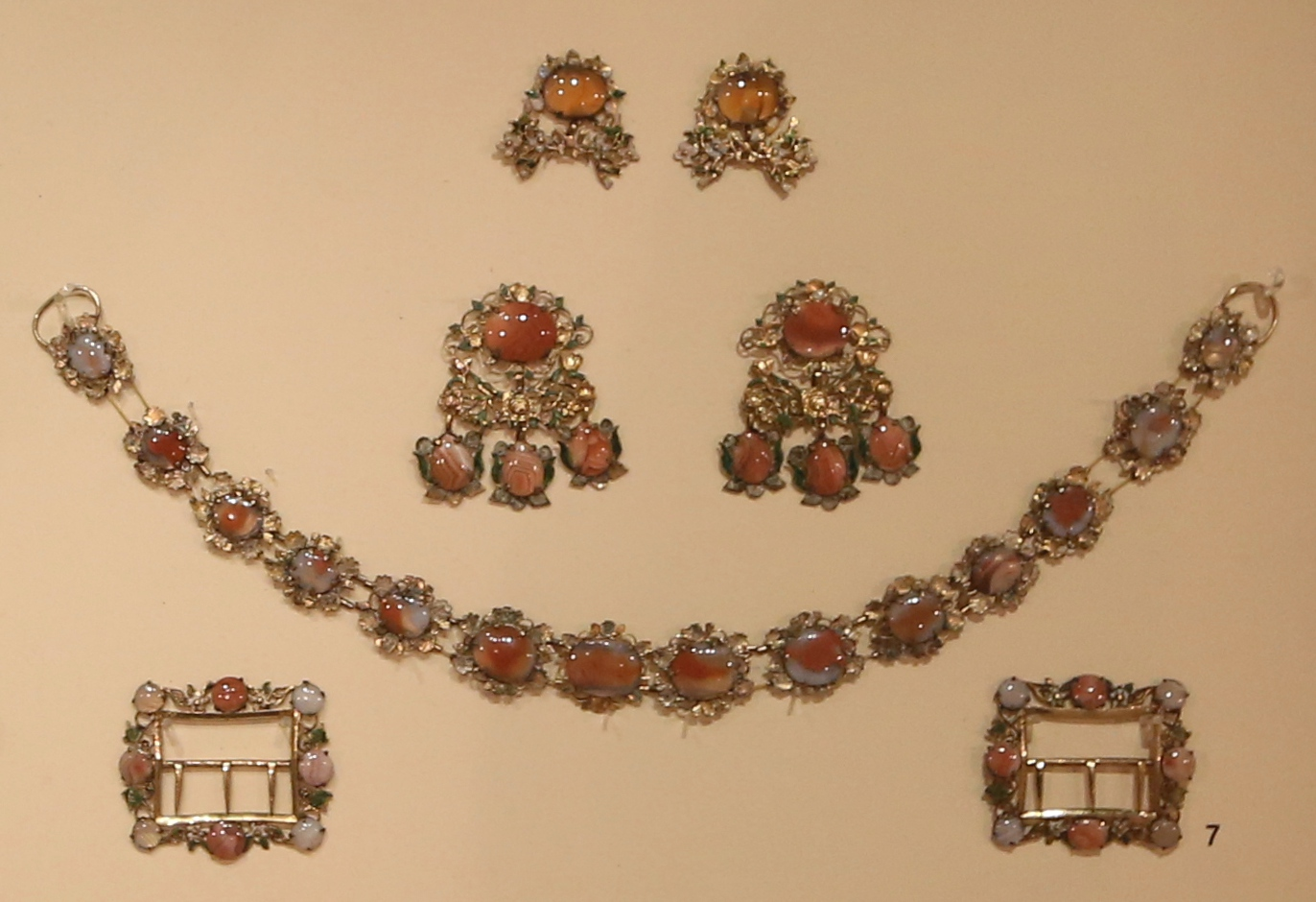
A set of 16th Century Scottish pebble jewels, made of agate, gold and enamel

=== Pebble jewellery ===
Pebble jewellery, featuring the stones agate or "Scotch Pebbles", Cairngorm, jasper, jaspagate, and sometimes bloodstone, freshwater pearls, gold, silver and granite, is a style of jewellery that has a long history associated with Scotland. Queen Victoria helped make the style become fashionable and she collected cairngorm stones on her walks on Beinn a' Bhùird near Balmoral Castle. Pebble jewellery refers to a style rather than a specific item, with many examples of pebble brooches and bracelets, though other items such as pendants have also been known to be decorated in this style.

== Materials ==
The materials traditionally used to create jewellery in Scotland are also found in the local area such as the agate mined from volcanic rocks north of Dundee.

=== Metals ===
The most common forms of metal in Scottish jewellery are silver, enamel, gold and pewter. These are often the backing to a stone setting in the case of rings and brooches, but can also provide decoration through casting and other decorative methods. Gold can be found in Scotland around the areas of Lowther Hills, Wanlockhead, and Leadhills. The first documentation of gold in the area is from the 16th century, and this gold was made into the Scottish Crown and supported a community of goldsmiths around the country who are still active today. There was even a short-lived gold rush in the 1860s. Silver was also actively mined in Scotland, with over five individual sites that, over time, have had silver extracted from them. There was a silver mine at Hilderston near Bathgate in 1608.

=== Stones ===
Stones such as agate, cairngorm citrine, jasper, malachite and granite were mined in the hills of Scotland and were popular in jewellery. Agate was made popular in Scottish jewellery styles in the 19th century, popularised by Queen Victoria. These stones are often found on bracelets, pendants and brooches.

Sapphires, although rare in Scotland, can be mined from the Isle of Harris.

=== Scottish pearls ===
Pearls are often used in jewellery in Scotland. They were added to the Scottish Crown in the 16th century, and embroidered on the costumes of Mary, Queen of Scots and Anne of Denmark. They come from a pearl-bearing mussel, M. margaritifera, half the population of which are native to Scotland. A daughter of Thomas Thomson, an apothecary to the Queen of Scots, wore a head dress set with 73 Scottish pearls all of equal size.

The Privy Council of Scotland regulated the collection of pearls in Scottish waters. In 1622 the pearl trade was investigated. A few pearls had been sold without licence in Aberdeen. Pearls were found in the Forth, the Cart near Paisley, and in some of the Galloway rivers. In 1620 Thomas Menzies of Durn and Cults, Provost of Aberdeen, gave James VI and I a valuable pearl found in the Kellie burn, a tributary of the River Ythan. The pearl is said to have been set in the royal crown.

== Techniques ==
Throughout history, metalworkers did not only produce jewellery, but also worked to produce handles and decorative cookware. Cold metalworking techniques can be used to make penannular brooches, beginning with wire and then flattening the ends to create the brooch shape.

== History ==
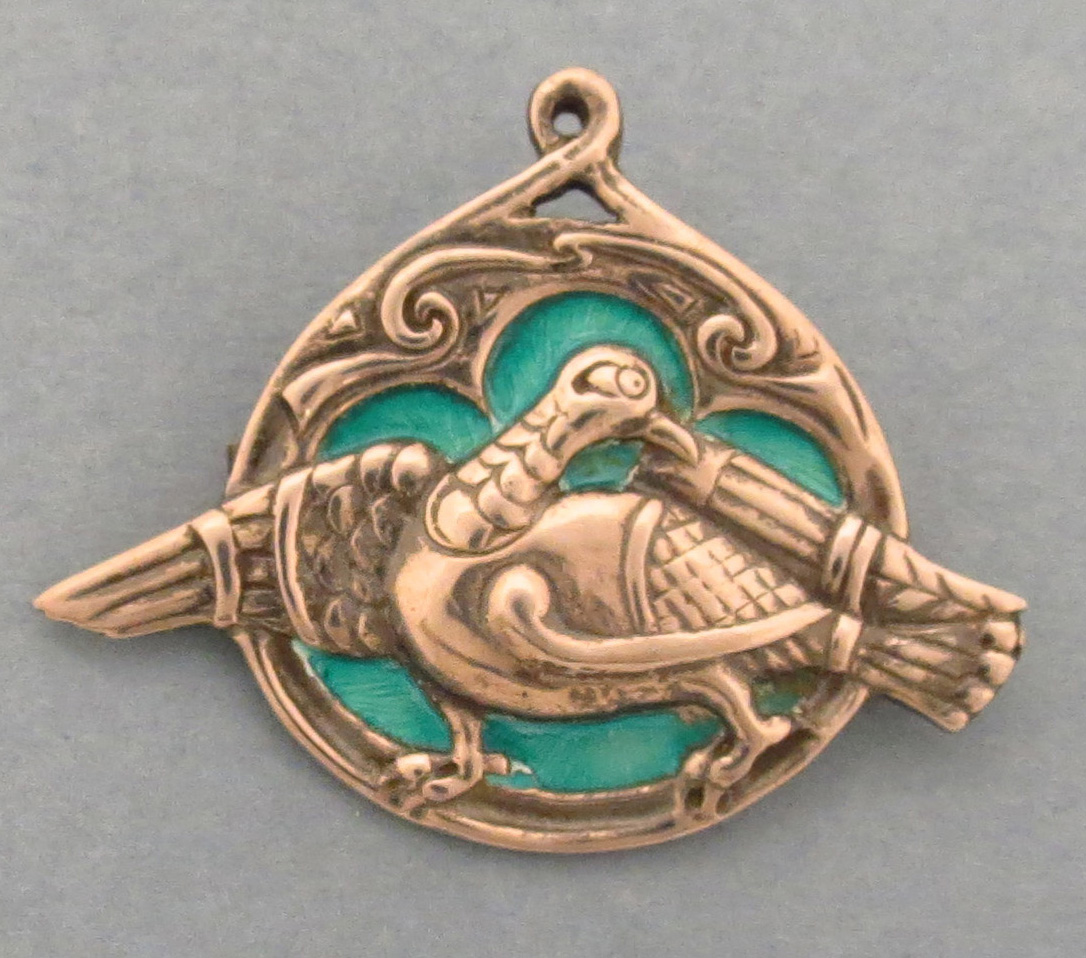
A pendant with a Celtic pattern from Iona

The crafting of jewellery or fictional items that could have been embellished to create a form of jewellery has a history in Scotland dating back to at least 300BCE, with the emergence of the "Celtic" style of decoration. The Celtic style and the Pictish style are very similar and both have an influence in Scottish jewellery today. Pictish has been discovered through archaeological investigation since the 18th century, and is commonly made of silver. A sizeable example of a discovery of Pictish jewellery was found at the Gaulcross hoard in Aberdeenshire, with examples of fragments of silver bracelets, brooches, and pendants from the post-Roman period. These finds contain examples of chain work, and ornate decoration on the fragments. They are now on display at the National Museum in Edinburgh. Other Pictish hoards have often found torcs, and different kinds of penannular brooches, some zoomorphic, though bronze brooches are more common than silver.

In the Middle Ages, ornate jewellery was a sign of a high class. Lower-class people tended to wear more simple items that were primarily functional and made of more simple materials such as copper or pewter, compared to richer materials such as silver or gold.

During the 1800s, a boom in the production of Scottish-style jewellery resulted due to the building of railways in Britain and increased access to travel. Scotland became a holiday destination, and jewellery was in demand as a souvenir. As a result, the styles of Scottish jewellery started to be produced in England, specifically Birmingham and Exeter.

A resurgence of Celtic and medieval style Scottish jewellery occurred in the 19th century, as did the popularisation of agate pieces, also known as "pebble jewellery". During this period there was a rise in creation and wear of brooches and bracelets set with Scottish stones due to Queen Victoria's interest in agates, cairngorm quartz, and citrines. The interest in agate re-emerged again in the 1970s. The Victoria and Albert Museum has many examples of Scottish jewellery from the later half of the 19th century, both pebble styles and Celtic designs.

The modernist period of jewellery making began in Britain in the 1950s, inspired by the sleek, simple style of Scandinavian designs from earlier in the 20th century. According to the National Museum of Scotland, "British Modernist jewellery became defined by the use of textural, sculptural gold work, inspired by nature and often incorporating large gemstones".

== Modern ==
Today, Scotland offers a wide range of styles of jewellery, ranging from the traditional Celtic style, to vintage Victorian and Edwardian pieces, to contemporary art deco and art nouveau styles.

The tradition of jewellery making in Scotland continues today with many courses offered in Colleges around Scotland in various levels of difficulty in jewellery making.

== Crown Jewels ==
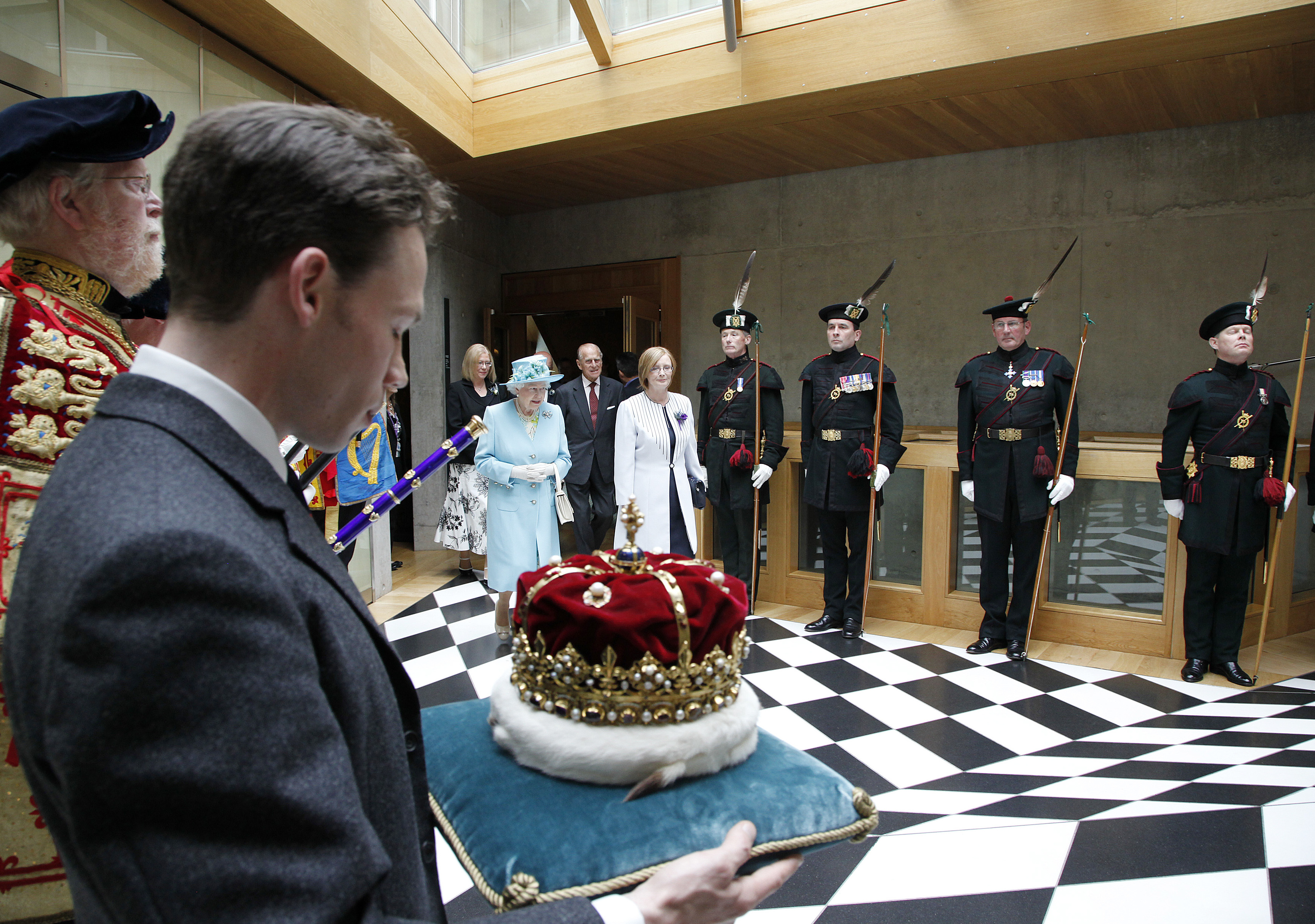
The Scottish Crown in 2011

Despite the Honours of Scotland often being referred to as the "crown jewels", there are no pieces of pure jewellery in the usual sense in the set. It consists of the crown, the sceptre, and the Sword of State. The crown is the only object of the three that is supposed to have been made in Scotland. It was originally dated from approximately 1503, but was remodelled due to damage in 1540 by the Edinburgh goldsmith John Mosman. Over six weeks, Mosman added 68 Scottish freshwater pearls, 41 ounces of gold, and 44 gemstones to the new crown, but also made use of the gold and jewels from the original state crown.

== Other Noteworthy Pieces ==
This section contains information on other famous pieces of jewellery that either originate from or are associated with Scotland.

=== Stewart Jewels ===
The Stewart Jewels are items of jewellery that originate from the Stewart dynasty who ruled Scotland for generations and went on to rule England after the death of Elizabeth I. The set consists of three items, all of which are on display with the Honours at Edinburgh Castle: the St. Andrew Jewel, a collar of the Order of the Garter, and a ring with a ruby set into it.

=== Lorne Jewels ===
The Lorne Jewels, part of the Secondary Honours of Scotland, were gifted to the nation in the 1930s by Princess Louise, Duchess of Argyle. The jewels consist of a single necklace with a pendant and a locket that was made in London in the 1870s and was a gift from the 9th Duke of Argyll to his soon-to-be wife. It consists of a chain made of diamonds studded with pearls, the pendant has a pearl set in the centre which is surrounded by two rows of diamonds of different shapes. The locket hangs from the bottom of the pendant and is attached by 2 emeralds shaped into the likeness of bog myrtle. The locket itself is shaped like a pear and is encrusted with diamonds, with extra decoration in sapphires depicting the motto of the House of Lorne and the Galley of Lorne. This piece is also on display at Edinburgh Castle.

== Noteworthy jewellers ==
=== Matthew Auchlek ===
Matthew and John Auchlek worked for James IV and Margaret Tudor. They were recorded making chains and necklaces. They gilded the sceptre, the king's spurs and the buckles of the queen's bridle and horse harness. Matthew Auchlek gilded a reliquary of Saint Duthac.

=== John and James Mosman ===
The two Mosman men, John and his son James, were members of a family of goldsmiths who worked in Edinburgh in the 16th century. They served as court jewellers to the Stewart family during their Scottish rule, and worked at the Scottish mint. They are also known for owning the John Knox House in Edinburgh. The identities of the two men are often confused, with some sources being unclear on who is the father and who is the son. John Mosman is most famous for remodelling the Scottish crown in 1540. He made a reliquary for a bone of St Adrian of May for James V from Scottish gold.

James Mosman was a son of John Mosman. He and James Cockie were made free men of the Edinburgh incorporation of goldsmiths on 1 May 1557. He was the court jeweller for Mary of Guise, and reportedly produced pieces for both her and the royal family. Mosman was executed for his loyalty to Mary, Queen of Scots, after the siege of Edinburgh Castle in 1573. He pledged Mary's jewels for loans and set up a mint for silver coins in the castle. He was hanged on 3 August 1573.

=== Thomas Foulis ===
Thomas Foulis was a goldsmith who made silver plate for James VI and others. He was an apprentice of Michael Gilbert and became an important financier of the crown.

=== Jacob Kroger ===
Anne of Denmark employed Jacob Kroger as her personal jeweller for four years, until he ran away to England with a stable hand and a bag of her jewels in 1594. Her next goldsmith was Elias Le Tellier, who lived in Edinburgh's Canongate.

=== George Heriot, elder and younger ===
George Heriot (died 1610) was an important member of the Edinburgh Goldsmith's incorporation. His son George Heriot (1563-1624) is known for supplying jewels to Anne of Denmark, at least two pieces survive. He founded a school in Edinburgh.

=== Charles Rennie Mackintosh ===
Although Charles Rennie Mackintosh was not a jeweller himself, he made a significant contribution to influencing the style of jewellery through his work as a designer. Today, "Charles Rennie Mackintosh" jewellery is sold that are pieces made to replicate decorative work he did on furniture, buildings, and light fixtures.
