= Mary King (merchant) =

Scottish businesswoman (c.1590 – 1644)

Mary King (c.1590 – 1644), also known as Marie King, was a member of a prominent family of lawyers and academics, whose reputation and fortunes waxed and waned during Europe's religious wars in the 17th century, especially the Wars of the Three Kingdoms. Above and beyond her standing as a member of that family, she was a Scottish burgess in her own right and a friend and intimate of several significant figures in early British political history.

== Early life and family ==
She was born in Edinburgh towards the end of the 16th century, the daughter of Jonet King and Alexander King. Her mother, Jonet King, was the daughter of Alexander King, advocate. Her mother's first husband, James Mosman, was executed in 1573 for his support of Mary, Queen of Scots. Jonet then remarried a cousin from Aberdeen, also named Alexander King. Mary had at least two other siblings: James King and William King. James was her elder brother and heir to her deceased father's property. Her brother William seems to have been closest in age to Mary and have had a closer relationship with her. In August 1616, as recorded on the same page of Edinburgh's parish records, Mary married Thomas Nimmo and William married Margaret Cass.

Thomas and Mary King had four children – Alexander, Euphame, Jonet and William. Mary's brother William was a witness at the baptisms of all of her children. He was recorded as "William King, Regent in Philosophy" in the baptismal record of Mary's daughter Jonet (no doubt named after their mother), identifying him as the professor of philosophy who taught at the University of Edinburgh from 1607 until 1630 and who was then minister of Cramond church from 1631 until his death in 1632. Thomas Craufurd, William's contemporary at the University of Edinburgh and historian of the university, states that William was the "son of a north country gentleman, who, marrying a sister of Alexander King, Advocate, had settled himself in Edinburgh, attending the laws".

Mary's mother Jonet was an independent business woman, who was 'actively involved in the property trade.' One of Jonet's properties was the house now known as John Knox House in Edinburgh, which was the property of her first husband James Mosman whose initials 'J' 'M' are still visible today on the house. The house was seized after James Mosman's execution, but was legally regained by Jonet after her marriage to Mary's father Alexander and before James, Mary, and William King were born.

Like her mother, Mary was also an independent business woman, involved in the manufacturing of garments and fine cloths, which were then sold from a shop on the High Street called a laich forebooth, or a low stall. As a burgess, she also had voting rights in the city, another indicator of her own social standing.

== Mary King's Close ==
In later life, Mary and her children lived in what was then known as King's or Alexander King's Close. The name originally came from her grandfather (her mother Jonet's father), but the property came to be more associated with her uncle Alexander King junior, who lived there and was a significant and well-known legal and political figure in early British political history. Mary's uncle and Alexander's younger brother Adam King (academic), a well-known writer and academic, inherited the property upon Alexander's death in 1618. The name of the close was later changed to Mary King, reflecting her role as the last significant member of the family to live there.

Mary died in late 1644, but her family's residence at Mary King's Close came to an end soon after as the wars of religion engulfed Edinburgh. After his death in 1632, William gave guardianship of his children to his and Mary's brother James King. James' will and the historical account of Thomas Craufurd confirm that William's children and James all died in 1645, a year after Mary's death. Craufurd further adds that William's family including his wife and children were 'translated to a better life' as a result of the great plague of that year.

Soon after the family's demise, the name Mary King became closely associated with the plague. The poet William Drummond of Hawthornden, who was a friend and former fellow student of William King's at Edinburgh University, wrote a poem entitled On Mary King's Pest. The Mary King of the poem was probably William King's daughter 'Marie', who is attested as dying of the plague in Thomas Craufurd's historical account, not her aunt Mary King.

On Mary King's Pest

TURN, citizens, to God; repent, repent,

And pray your bedlam frenzies may relent:

Think not rebellion a trifling thing

This plague doth fight for Mary and the King.

The central message of the poem is that the anti-government forces in the civil war were rejoicing at the demise of a family that was strongly associated with the pro-Stuart cause, especially of Mary, Queen of Scots, for generations (see Mosman and Alexander King above). The outbreak of the plague in Edinburgh in 1645 was inextricably linked with the civil war, as soldiers returning to Edinburgh from Newcastle upon Tyne at that time brought the plague with them. The pro-Stuart Royalists at Newcastle under Robert Maxwell, 1st Earl of Nithsdale were first recorded as dying from the plague inside the city walls. Mary King's cousin Catherine Heriot (the daughter of Jonet King's sister Margaret King and her husband goldsmith David Heriot) lived in Mary King Close in this period with her husband Robert Maxwell. The Earl of Nithsdale, the commander in Newcastle during the plague outbreak, was the godfather of Maxwell and Heriot's first-born son Robert. There was, therefore, a strong link between the residents of Mary King's Close and the garrison at Newcastle identified as one of the key focal points for the plague outbreak of 1645.

== Modern Mary King's Close ==
Mary King’s Close consists of a number of closes which were originally narrow streets with tenement houses on either side, stretching up to seven storeys high and located in the heart of the city of Edinburgh’s Old Town (affectionately nicknamed at the time as Auld Reekie) in Scotland.

Due to over-crowding, the city reopened the closes some 40 years later. In 1753 the burgh council decided to erect a new building on this site, the Royal Exchange (now the City Chambers). The houses at the top of the closes were knocked down and part of the lower sections were kept and used as the foundations for the Royal Exchange. The remnants of the closes were left beneath the building.
