= Adam King =

Adam King may refer to:

- Adam King (footballer), Scottish footballer
- Adam King (Canadian politician), Canadian politician
- Adam King (American politician), US congressman
- Adam King (cricketer), English cricketer
- Adam King (academic) (c. 1560 – 1620), Scottish university professor and administrator

== See also ==
- Adam King Hodgins, Canadian politician
