= Adam King (academic) =

Early modern academic and writer

Adam King (c. 1560 – 10 August 1620) was an early modern writer, poet, and academic. He was a university professor and administrator at the University of Paris and a significant educational reformer in Scotland in the late 16th and early 17th centuries. He played an important role in establishing the ideas and methods of the new sciences in early-modern formal education at Paris and, in collaboration with his nephew William King, at the University of Edinburgh after his return to Scotland in 1595.

== Education and career ==
Adam was the son of Catherine Young and Alexander King senior, a respected Edinburgh advocate. He graduated M.A. from St Leonard's College in 1580. He then moved to the University of Paris to study and work, firstly at the College Du Plessis (1581–1588), then as professor of mathematics and philosophy at the College de Lisieux (1588–1592). He was procurator three times and treasurer of the German Nation, a governing body of the University of Paris, and also ran unsuccessfully for the rectorship of the university (1589). Contemporary evidence exists for his academic position at Paris in the three years between 1592 and 1595. In his entry in a 1597 Album Amicorum, King described himself as the recent Petroramaeus Professor of mathematics at Paris. This three-year position was available from 1592 onwards. Upon the expiration of the three years at the end of 1595, King returned to Edinburgh.

== Return to Scotland ==
Upon his arrival back in Britain, King was detained by religious authorities in relation to his Catholicism. English diplomat George Nicholson reported to Robert Bowes, English ambassador in Edinburgh, that 'ministers caused apprehend Mr. Adam Kinge' who had arrived from France. Nicholson told Bowes that he would inform him upon King's 'examination' by the authorities at a later date.

While in Edinburgh, Adam King was an active supporter of King James. He was intimately involved in defending King James during the so-called Gowrie conspiracy in 1600, contributing to an anonymous publication justifying King James' execution of John Ruthven, Lord Gowrie. His poem celebrating the King's role in the affair is appended to a prose defence in the main work. Although anonymous, thanks to the survival of the poem in Adam King's manuscript (see works below), it can positively be identified as his work. He also published a poem in 1603 celebrating King James becoming the King of England and uniting the two kingdoms of Scotland and England in personal union and in 1617 to mark the King's return to Edinburgh. The latter poem was republished in 1618 in the official collection of all of the celebratory poems from the visit across Scotland known as the Muses Welcome.

== Works ==
King's large body of poetic and prose works survives in both printed and manuscript form. The majority of his poetry was published posthumously in the 1637 anthology of Scottish Latin Delitiae Poetarum Scotorum. Contained in this collection are several significant and substantial pedagogical poems on astronomy and cosmology, which deal directly with new scientific and philosophical concepts such as hypotheses on multiple universes and heliocentrism. (see selected poetry below).

A manuscript containing the poetry that was not published is stored in the library of the University of Edinburgh. It is bound with a larger manuscript that contains King's most important work: a large prose commentary on the poem De Sphaera by George Buchanan. The commentary is a comprehensive account of ancient, medieval, and early-modern cosmology and natural philosophy. In a letter to William King (Adam King's nephew, see above), Jacobean poet and bibliophile William Drummond of Hawthornden stated that King's edition of the Sphaera was the most outstanding work of his 'excellent' corpus, written by 'the most learned man' that Scotland had produced. The survival of classroom student notes and published student disputations show that this sentiment was shared by the university community in general: the commentary was used for instruction in cosmology, astronomy, and natural philosophy at the University of Edinburgh from the early 17th century until at least 1650.

A letter, calendar, and catechism all written by King in Scots survive. Like King's Latin poetry from Paris, they date from the late 16th century, and reveal his sympathy for the Counter-Reformation in Scotland and Europe in that period.

== Later life and death ==
In 1607, King married Margaret Mawer, widow of Walter Mawer. Both Margaret and Adam owned property on High Street in Edinburgh. Margaret inherited a property on Strichen Close behind St Giles Cathedral. On March 17, 1618, Adam King inherited the King family properties including Drydane, neighbouring Hawthornden Castle, and a property in what is now known as Mary King's Close – named after Adam's niece, but which was originally named Alexander King's Close after his father and brother. Adam King died on 10 August 1620.
