= Michael Sym =

- Born: Kingdom of Scotland
- Died: 1577; London, Kingdom of England
- Known for: Goldsmith for Regent Morton

Michael Sym or Syme (died 1577) was a Scottish goldsmith who worked for Regent Morton.

Sym applied to become a master goldsmith in Edinburgh in November, 1574. He was instructed to make an essay or masterpiece either in the workshop of John Mosman junior or George Heriot the elder. His essay of silver work was accepted on 6 February 1575.

In October, 1575 Regent Morton sent Sym to London. He was to fetch tools for making coins and buy silver plate. Morton wrote to Francis Walsingham asking him to help Sym. Morton wanted some rubies cut or "tabled" in London, and he hoped Walsingham would send someone to help Sym discuss the commission with the craftsmen.

Michael Sym died in London on 16 July 1577. His stock in Edinburgh included precious stones, amethysts, turquoises, a little gold heart, enamelling colours, borax, and five crystal glasses probably for miniature cases.

His son John was also a goldsmith. His sister Katherine Sym (d. 1586) was married to another goldsmith, John Mosman junior.
