= John Mosman (goldsmith) =

Scottish goldsmith

- Occupation: Goldsmith
- Known for: Creating jewellery for the royal court

John Mosman or Mossman was a Scottish goldsmith based in Edinburgh who served the royal court and was involved in gold mining. He was warden of the mint from 24 August 1539.

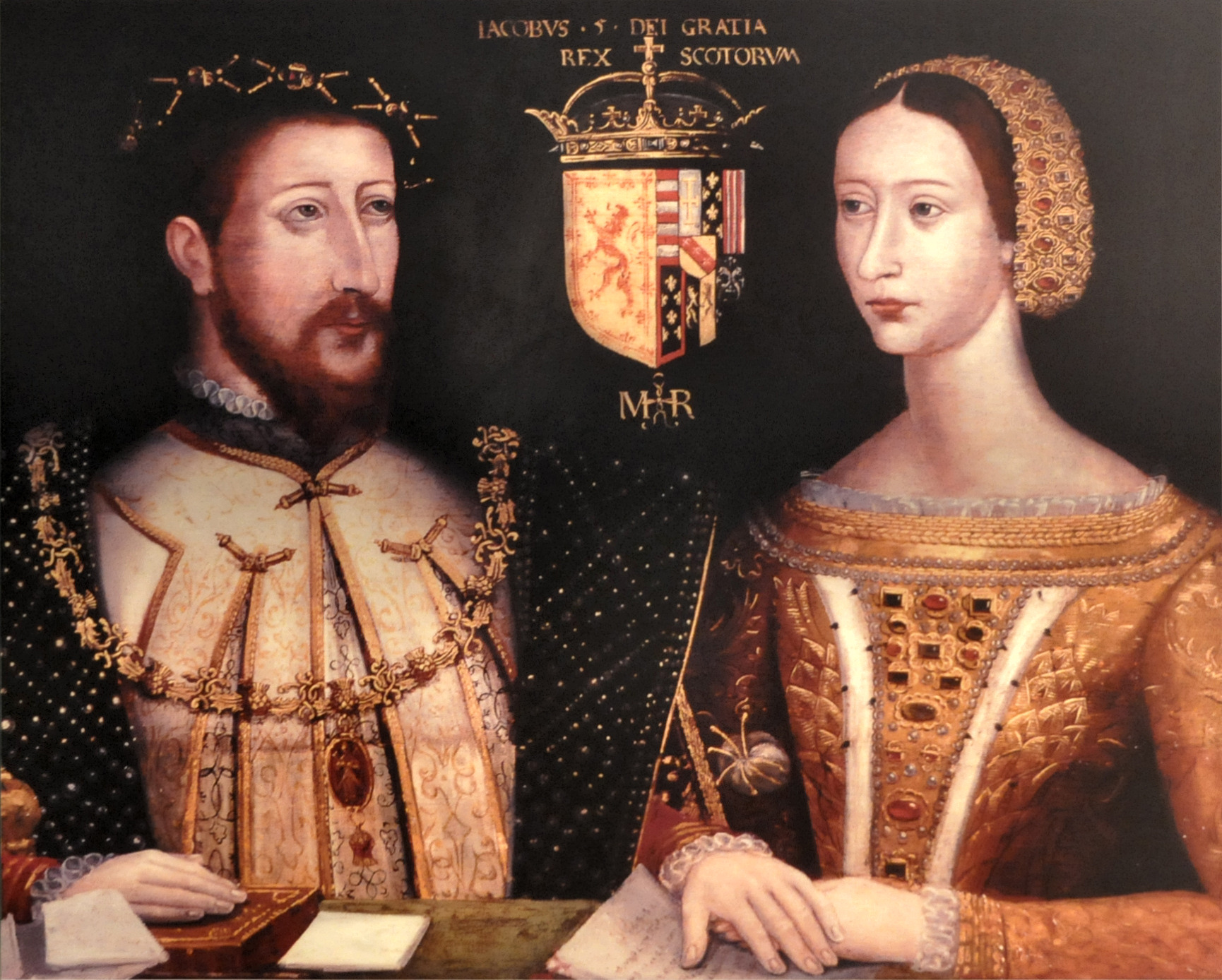
John Mosman made jewellery for James V and Mary of Guise

== Family background ==
There is some confusion between the John Mosman who served King James V and the activities of other members of the family. Another John Mosman of a previous generation was an Edinburgh apothecary. A branch of the family including a John Mosman and his son Robert Mosman was recorded in February 1490 in connection with their tenancy of the lands of "Easter Gledstanis".

In 1508, a John Mosman and his servant John Bykat were involved in a violent struggle involving several Edinburgh goldsmiths. Daggers were drawn and William Currour cut James McCalyean's lip with a goldsmith's file. This John Mosman was married to Agnes Bartholmew in 1512. Alan Mosman was also a goldsmith in Edinburgh at this time, and was involved in organising a pageant of the Passion in 1507.

Another John Mosman was a public notary in Glasgow. He worked for Agnes Sinclair, Countess of Bothwell, the mother of James Hepburn, 4th Earl of Bothwell in the 1550s.

== Career ==
One of John Mosman's early recorded works was a set of silver clasps for the king's haubergeon, a piece of chain-mail armour in February 1534. Mosman made gold buttons for king's clothes, some sewn to his hats and bonnets.

=== Scottish gold ===
Mosman was involved in gold mining in Scotland. In 1538 Mosman made a hat badge or ensign, called in the Scots language, featuring a mermaid, set with diamonds, from the "Kingis awne gold" with some gold provided by James V. Mosman also made a gold heart from the king's "own gold", although it is not clear if this phrase means only that James V provided the gold used by Mosman.

In 1539 French-speaking miners arrived from the Duchy of Lorraine sent by the Duchess of Guise. Mosman paid their expenses from Edinburgh to the mines at Crawford Moor and for their equipment. The royal accounts specify that several pieces made by Mosman were fashioned from Scottish gold. He made "chafferonys", gold ornaments for coifs or French hoods for gentlewomen, using "gold of [the] mynd" mixed with gold from coins. Mosman was paid for a nugget of gold, "unwrocht gold of the mynde", that was sent to the Duke of Guise, the father of the queen consort Mary of Guise.

=== Queens of Scotland ===
In May 1538 the fool of Madeleine of Valois was bought a green velvet gown and Mosman made her a "chaffron" of gilded silver. In April 1539 Mosman was given gold coins and gold from a Scottish mine to make hair pieces called "chafferonys" for the women of the court of Mary of Guise. He made a "chafferoun" of gold in "Paris work" or fashion for a "hood of the French sort" one of the daughters of James V, probably Lady Jean Stewart. This was a Scots word for a jewelled strip bordering the front of a hood or coif. In an inventory of Margaret Tudor's jewels in 1516 a "chaffron" comprises the jewelled border and also the velvet hood or hair bag, embroidered with pearl.

Another goldsmith, Thomas Rynd, who was based in St Andrews sold a "chaffron" to Mary of Guise in May 1539, when she was staying at Pitlethy near Leuchars, and James V bought chains and pendants from Rynd to give to the queen's gentlewomen at this time. The gifts to the women of the queen's household bought from Mosman and Rynd were occasioned by the queen's pregnancy.

In December 1539 Mosman made a zibellino for Mary of Guise from Scottish gold, comprising the head and feet of a marten fashioned in gold to be worn with the fur. Mary, Queen of Scots gave this fur with a gold head and feet to Mademoiselle Rallay in December 1561 to mend and re-line, described as an item to wear around her neck.

Mosman made Mary of Guise a belt from Scottish gold with a sapphire. He supplied a fastening for her belt called a "cleik" on 4 March 1540. Mosman was given gold coins called by "riders" by the king's pursemaster John Tennent to make some items.

Mosman made rings for James V from Scottish gold and stones described as "Scottish diamonds." He also made silver reliquaries for bones of St Malo and Adrian of May. He made at least two whistles for the king from Scottish gold, and one had a dragon coloured with enamel. The whistles may have been used by the king on his ships, including the Salamander. Mosman made a silver whistle for the "patroun", the commander of the king's new ships. James V was also fond of hawking, and Mosman fashioned a silver clam shell as a luxurious accessory to hold the meat used to train the birds. He made a second clam shell for hawk meat in December 1541 with another, half the size, for the king's tooth powder. In February 1541 he made the king two gold bells for hawks and a silver case for tooth-picks. In June 1542 he was asked to enlarge the second clam shell for hawking.

=== Armour ===
Mosman made or decorated several items of armour for James V. He gilded a copper horse armour in March 1539. The barding for the king's great horse of velvet was completed by the silkwoman Helen Ross who made tassels and passementerie. Her work also decorated the king's books. Decorative metalwork made William Forrest and gilded by Mosman for use on tournament armour and horse trapping included buckles, thistles, lion's heads, and pendants.

=== Gifts for kings ===
In 1540 James V sent hackney riding horses as gifts to Francis I, the Dauphin, and the Duke of Guise. The horses were equipped with elaborate harnesses and cover cloths, fitted with buckles, and decorative thistles and lion's heads, which Mosman gilded using mercury. The weaver Helen Ros made silk fringes for this horse tack, and she also made passementerie for chairs. The king's former favourite James Hamilton of Finnart was executed in August 1540, and his silver was brought from Craignethan Castle to Edinburgh, where Mosman engraved it with the heraldry of the king's infant eldest son, James, Duke of Rothesay.

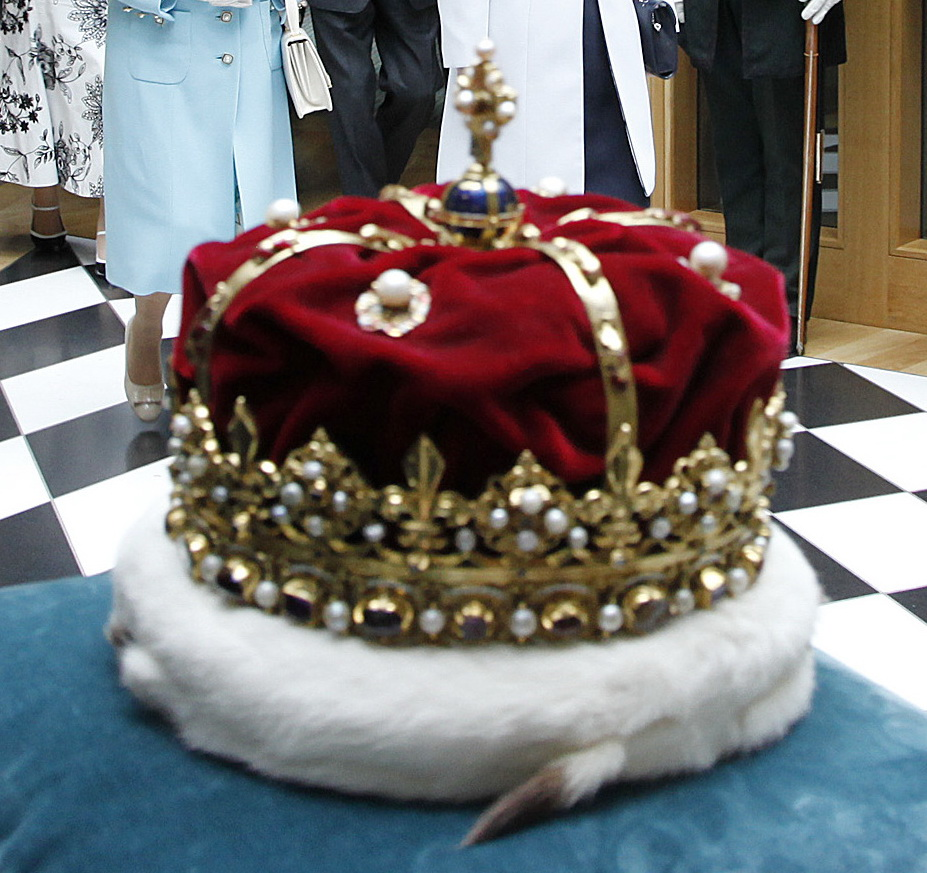
The Crown of Scotland made by John Mosman in 1540

John Mosman was bought clothes like others regarded as members of the royal household, including black satin for a doublet, and a black cloak. He was not an exclusive maker or supplier of jewelry to the Scottish royal court, the king frequently bought pieces from the goldsmith Thomas Rynd, especially for the New Year's Day gifts which he distributed to courtiers. Thomas Rynd was a relation of Jonet Rynd, who founded Edinburgh's Magdalen Chapel.

== The crown of Scotland ==
James V employed Adam Leys to repair and augment the crown in the 1530s. Mosman is known for making and refurbishing the crown of Scotland in January 1540. He included ciphers of "JR5". The crown is kept at Edinburgh Castle with other items known as the Honours of Scotland. The treasurer's accounts mention Scottish "gold of the mine", three great garnet stones and a great emerald or amethyst. Mosman delivered the finished crown to James V at Holyrood Palace on 7 February. The tailor Thomas Arthur made a bonnet to line the crown from purple velvet. John Paterson made a case to keep it in.

Mosman made and gilded a silver sceptre and made a crown for the coronation of Mary of Guise in Edinburgh on 22 February 1540. This crown, which does not survive, may have been used in 1590 at the coronation of Anna of Denmark. Mosman was given Scottish gold, from Crauford Moor, to augment the king and queen's crowns in June 1542.

== Regent Arran ==
Mosman also worked for Regent Arran and was rewarded in May 1550 for his "diligent labours" in making the gold chain presented to "Fumet", François de Seguenville-Fumel, sieur de Thors, the French envoy who brought the peace treaty at the end of the war with England known as the Rough Wooing. Mary of Guise paid for half of the gold used in this chain.

In January 1552 he made chains and "target" hat-badges and other pieces for Regent Arran, and he probably made the jewellery which was distributed at the wedding of his daughter Barbara Hamilton in February 1549, gold rings, hat-badges, and bracelets costing £156. Barbara Hamilton died in 1577, and her effects included a locket or "tablet" which opened with leaves on which the inscription "Obsecro Te Sancta Maria Mater Dei Amen" was engraved and highlighted with white enamel.

In 1552 he gilded a silver bell for Regent Arran. In 1564, the business papers of Matthew Hamilton of Milnburn, Arran's master of household, included "a ticket of John Mosman's compt of silver work in anno 1557".

== Mary of Guise, Queen Regent ==
John Mosman was appointed in September 1556 with Michael Gilbert, William Ure, and Robert Rynd to collect and oversee contributions from members of Edinburgh incorporation of goldsmiths to a tax levied by Mary of Guise for the defence of the Scottish Borders. In October 1558, he provided Mary of Guise with a gold chain for Monsieur Delaforce, the French admiral of the ships that returned Scottish lords from Mary's marriage to the Dauphin. The workmen in his "buith" were given a drinksilver reward for a quick turnaround. Mosman probably died soon after.

== Marriage and family ==
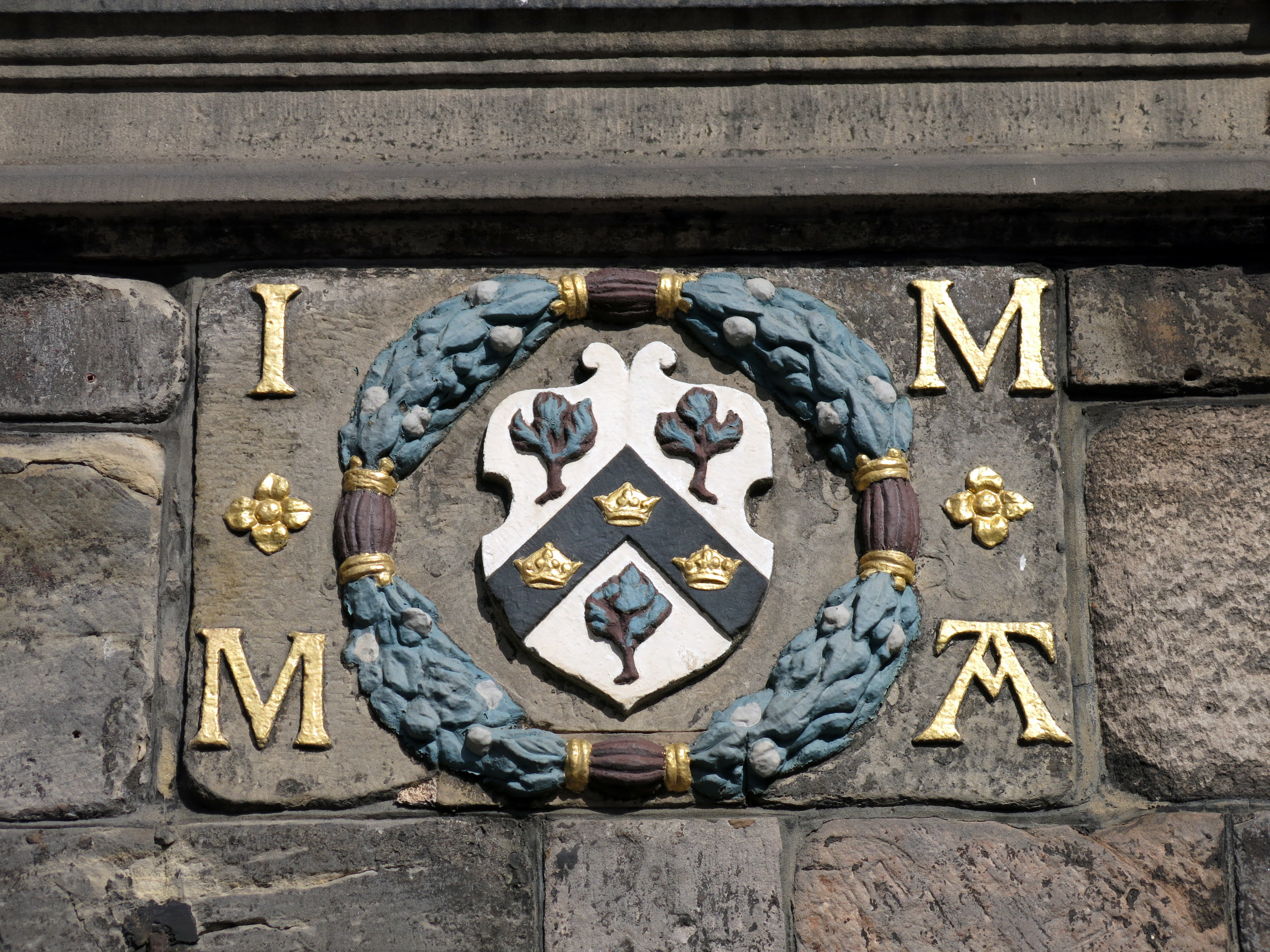
Arms of James Mosman and Mariota Arres on the John Knox House

John Mosman married Katherine Sym. Their children included:

- John Mosman, burgess of Edinburgh from September 1564. He married Susanna Wilson (d. 1593) a daughter of the merchant Luke Wilson, their children included Susanna and John Mosman. He made a cup in 1586 used at Rosneath Kirk in Dunbartonshire, and now in the National Museum of Scotland. In 1593 the stock of their shop included a number of rings set with precious and counterfeit or "slight" stones, and a "tablet" or locket with the miniature portraits of James VI and Anne of Denmark worth £57 Scots.
- James Mosman, who married Mariota Arres, and secondly in 1571, Janet King, and rebuilt the "John Knox House" on the Royal Mile in Edinburgh. On 16 December 1558 he weighed and valued the treasures of St Giles' Kirk including the reliquary of the saint's arm bone. James Mosman and his workshop made gold chains for Mary, Queen of Scots to give as diplomatic gifts. In April 1566 he sold the queen rings and other pieces which were probably intended as presents to her attendants. He was an assay master in the mint and made dies for the coinage. With another goldsmith James Cockie, he helped raise money on the security of the jewels of Mary, Queen of Scots during the "lang siege" of Edinburgh castle and was executed in 1573.
  - The children of James Mosman included Marion Mosman (d. 1599), who married Andrew Meikle; and John Mosman younger, who had daughters, Elspeth and Marion Mosman.
