= Cairngorm quartz =

Scottish variety of smoky quartz

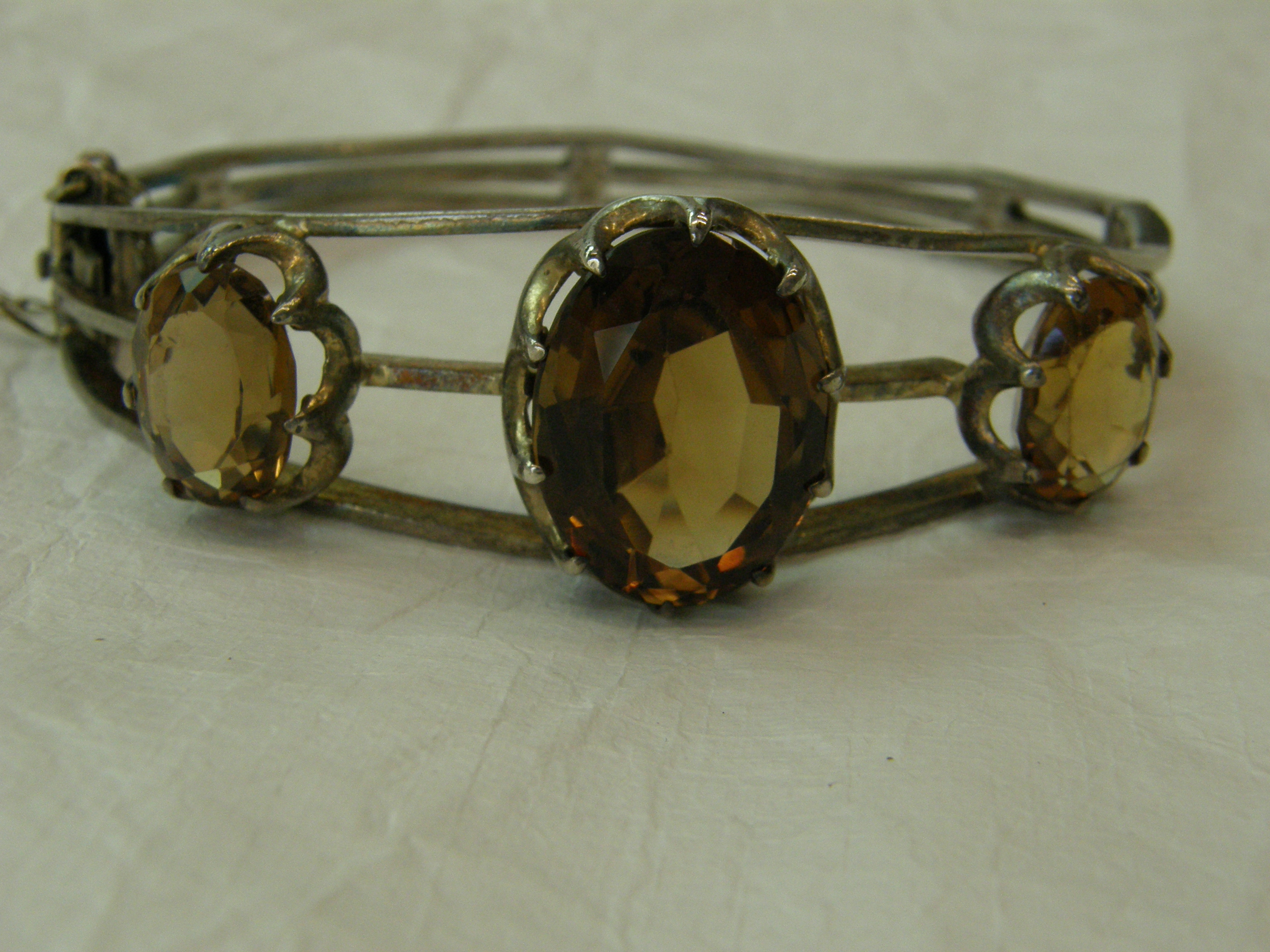
Bracelet with three Cairngorm stones

Cairngorm quartz, commonly shortened to cairngorm, is a yellow to dark-brown variety of smoky quartz traditionally associated with the Cairngorms of north-eastern Scotland. The name originally referred particularly to gem-quality quartz collected on Cairn Gorm, Ben Avon and neighbouring mountains, although it was later applied more broadly to brown or yellow Scottish quartz.

Cairngorm quartz became one of the best-known Scottish ornamental stones. From the eighteenth century onwards it was used in seals, brooches, buttons, snuff mulls and the fittings of weapons and accessories associated with Highland dress. Its colour, geographical origin and association with Highland culture gave it a distinct identity despite its mineralogical classification as smoky quartz.

== Name and terminology ==
Cairngorm is "a yellow or brown variety of quartz", named from Cairn Gorm in the Grampian Mountains. Matthew Forster Heddle catalogued it as "Cairngorm, or Smoky Quartz".

The traditional use of the term was partly geographical. It referred especially to crystals from the Cairngorm granite, but Heddle also recorded material called cairngorm from Sutherland, the Hebrides and other parts of Scotland. In the gem trade, yellow and brown quartz from other countries was also historically sold as cairngorm, "false topaz" or simply "topaz", although true topaz is a different mineral.

The boundaries between cairngorm, citrine, smoky quartz and morion are based chiefly on colour and usage rather than sharp mineralogical distinctions. Yellow quartz is generally termed citrine, brown material smoky quartz, and very dark brown or almost black material morion.

== Mineralogy ==
Chemically, cairngorm is ordinary quartz, SiO_{2}. Its smoky colour is a radiation effect: traces of uranium and thorium in the surrounding granite irradiate the crystal over geological time and create colour centres (defects) in the lattice, which absorb light and darken the stone.

Shades run from pale yellow through brown to the almost black material called morion; yellow stones are usually classed as citrine, and much of the yellow quartz sold by jewellers was in fact "burnt amethyst" (darkened by heating). Nineteenth-century writers put the brown tint down to titanium (the explanation still offered in the 1911 Encyclopædia Britannica) but that idea has long since been abandoned.

Heddle described the Cairngorm crystals as right- and left-handed; with oscillatory zoning frequent; and crystal twinning not uncommon with the twin forms comparatively simple.

== Geological occurrence ==
The classic Cairngorm localities lie within the Cairngorm pluton, a granitic body forming part of the eastern Grampian Highlands. The gem crystals occur in cavities and veins in the granite, including pegmatitic and fine-grained granitic veins cutting the coarser main granite.

As the granite weathered, its feldspar rotted down to kaolin and left the harder quartz crystals lying loose in the decayed rock. Heddle found the crystals "impacted in decomposed granitic veins, generally in Kaolin", some still carrying adherent crystals of orthoclase; beryl and blue topaz were, in his words, "rare associates".

Crystals also entered streams as the host rock eroded. They were collected as loose surface specimens and as water-worn pebbles in the bed and gravels of the River Avon. Topaz and beryl from the same mineralised district were similarly recovered as water-worn fragments.

=== Localities ===
Heddle recorded cairngorm on Cairn Gorm and several adjoining mountains, including Ben Avon and Beinn Mheadhoin. Material from the south side of Loch Avon was generally light-coloured and highly transparent, whereas crystals from its northern side ranged from dark brown to nearly black.

Individual crystals could be very large. Heddle reported specimens weighing 40 lb (18 kg) or more.

Other Scottish occurrences listed by Heddle included Ben Loyal and Quinag in Sutherland and granitic veins on North Rona in the North Atlantic. These occurrences show that the name was already in use beyond the Cairngorm Mountains.

=== Associated minerals ===
Minerals recorded with Cairngorm quartz include:

- orthoclase and other feldspars;
- kaolinite, produced by the decomposition of feldspar;
- beryl;
- colourless or pale blue topaz;
- rutile;
- tourmaline;
- chlorite;
- ilmenite; and
- garnet.

Heddle recorded rutile very rarely enclosed in brown rock crystal at Cairngorm and noted beryl inclusions in some Cairngorm crystals.

== History ==
=== Early collecting ===
Cairngorm crystals were being collected by the eighteenth century, before systematic mineralogical study of the district. Shepherds and other local residents found loose crystals on the hills, and travellers and collectors obtained specimens from them.

An early first-hand account comes from James Johnstone, the "Chevalier de Johnstone", who had fought in the rising of 1745. Fleeing through the hills after Culloden, he passed the mountain he knew as Cairngorm, where, he wrote, the shepherds picked up stones of many kinds with no notion of their worth. Johnstone himself put together a collection over several years.

He tells of giving stones away to aristocratic patrons and of having others cut and mounted as seals. Not all of his identifications stand up to scrutiny, but the memoir shows that by the mid-1700s stones off the Cairngorm hills were already being gathered, traded and made up into personal ornaments.

=== Excavation and trade ===
At first the crystals were simply picked up, off the hillsides or out of the burns. Later, diggers sank shallow pits into the soft, kaolinised granite to reach the crystal-bearing veins and cavities. The workings were small and scattered.

By the early nineteenth century, unusually large crystals were being brought from upper Aberdeenshire to Edinburgh. Some were recorded and moulded before lapidaries divided them into pieces for cutting and polishing.

Demand soon outran the supply of Scottish stones, and dealers turned to imported and treated quartz. Many gems sold and mounted as cairngorms therefore never came from Scotland at all — and by eye alone, a genuine Cairngorm stone cannot be told from a foreign one.

== Jewellery and decorative use ==
Cairngorm quartz was used in Scottish jewellery and decorative metalwork from at least the eighteenth century. Common uses included:

- brooches and plaid brooches;
- seals and fob seals;
- buttons and kilt pins;
- the handles or mounts of dirks and sgian-dubhs;
- the lids of snuff mulls;
- boxes and cases for jewellery, perfume, stationery and sewing equipment; and
- other accessories associated with Highland dress.

A rich sherry-yellow colour was particularly esteemed. Large stones were often cut as circular or oval faceted gems and mounted prominently in silver. Smaller cairngorms could be combined with agate, jasper, bloodstone and other materials in Scottish pebble jewellery.

The growing international interest in Scotland during the nineteenth century increased demand for jewellery presented as Highland or Scottish. Roy E. Starkey attributes an important part of this popularity to the influence of Walter Scott, the visit of George IV to Scotland in 1822 and Queen Victoria's attachment to Balmoral and the Highlands.

Cairngorm jewellery conveyed associations with the Scottish landscape and ancestry as well as monetary value. The stone's appeal depended not only on colour and brilliance but also on the belief that it had been obtained from the Scottish mountains.

=== Scottish Crown Jewels tradition ===
A persistent nineteenth-century tradition held that cairngorms were set in the Honours of Scotland. The German traveller Johann Georg Kohl repeated it in 1849, writing that sceptres of the regalia carried Scottish crystals of the kind.

Modern examination has not supported all such identifications. Starkey reports that stones in the regalia which had been described as cairngorm were considered more likely to be colourless rock crystal, while the Scottish origin of other mounted quartz stones could not be established.

== Cultural significance ==
Although quartz is a common mineral, cairngorm acquired a distinctive place in Scottish decorative art through its association with Highland culture. What set the stone apart was where it came from and what was made of it: a crystal from the Scottish mountains, worked into the fittings of Highland dress.

"Cairngorm" was always a trade name and a badge of origin, not just a mineralogical term. The stone is often spoken of as Scotland's traditional or national gem, though no statute or official act has ever declared it so.

Crystals and cairngorm-set jewellery survive in the collections of National Museums Scotland, the Natural History Museum, London, the British Museum and various regional Scottish museums, where the same material may be studied by turns as a mineral specimen, a trade good and a piece of Highland costume.

== Hyaline quartz ==
Heddle applied the name "hyaline quartz" to "a variety of Cairngorm, having much of a claret colour", which he found "somewhat abundantly in the belt of chloritic quartz rock which stretches from Fortingal through Ben Lawers and the central Perthshire hills to Loch Eck in Argyllshire".

The material is never crystallised and has, in his phrase, "something of colloidal appearance"; it is frequently pervaded by chlorite and forms the ordinary matrix of ilmenite and rutile in the district. Cut as an ornamental stone, Heddle judged, it "surpasses ordinary Cairngorm, not only in colour but in brilliancy and pellucidity".

== Imitations and fakes ==
The commercial pull of the name meant that a great deal of what was sold as cairngorm was nothing of the kind. Alongside honestly dug-up Scottish stones, the trade handled smoky and yellow quartz brought in from abroad, quartz darkened by artificial irradiation, heat-treated smoky quartz and amethyst, true topaz passed off under the quartz name, and plain coloured glass.

Testing readily separates quartz from topaz or glass, but no test will say whether a given cut stone came off Cairn Gorm. For that, provenance, inscriptions and old paperwork usually count for more than the stone itself.

== See also ==
- Smoky quartz
- Citrine
- Morion (mineral)
- Geology of Scotland
- Cairngorms

== Sources ==
- Brown, Emily; Laurenson, Sarah (2024). "Geology to Jewellery: The history and science of Cairngorm quartz". National Museums Scotland.
- Heddle, Matthew Forster (1901). Goodchild, J. G. (ed.). The Mineralogy of Scotland. Vol. 1. Edinburgh: David Douglas.
- Starkey, Roy E. (2014). Crystal Mountains: Minerals of the Cairngorms. Bromsgrove: British Mineralogy Publications. ISBN 978-0-9930182-1-3.
- Chisholm, Hugh, ed. (1911). "Cairngorm" . Encyclopædia Britannica. Vol. 4 (11th ed.). Cambridge University Press. p. 952.
