= Mungo Brady =

Goldsmith, King's man

Mungo Brady or Brydie or Brand was an Edinburgh goldsmith, regarded as a King's man in the civil war, he was appointed goldsmith to James VI of Scotland.

== Career ==
Brady was accepted as a "free man" of the Edinburgh craft of goldsmiths on 15 May 1561, as were David Denniestoun, Henry Thomson, and Gavin Freithman. Brady and other goldsmiths had to make a demonstration piece, undergo a verbal examination, and pay a fee known as an "upset". He was active in the craft, contributing to charity, working in some years as one of four masters supporting the Deacon, and as a "stentar" gathering contributions of money for taxes and dues owed by craft members. Brady was made a burgess of Edinburgh in July 1562, and it was recorded that his father was a burgess and goldsmith.

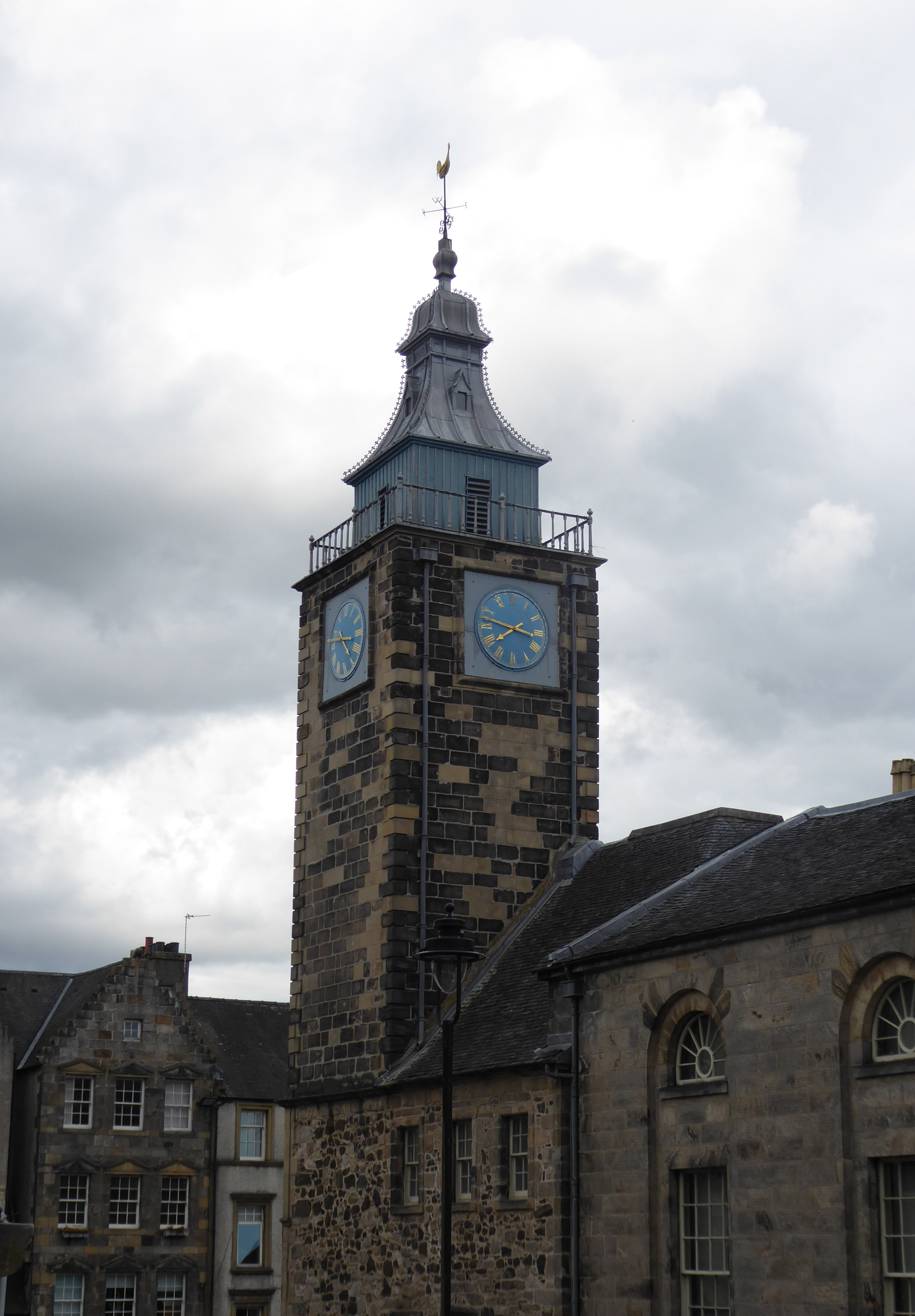
Mungo Brady made and gilded replica Honours of Scotland to be used at Stirling Tolbooth

=== Burgh council ===
In 1568, Mungo Brady was involved in arrangements made by Edinburgh burgh council for paying John Knox's rent for his lodging, known as "hous maill". In 1571, during the conflict known as the Marian Civil War, Brady joined the burgh council of Edinburgh. He took part in three-way discussions and negotiations between the townspeople of Edinburgh, Edinburgh Castle which was held for Mary, Queen of Scots, and Regent Lennox. Brady took the burgh council's opinions to Lennox at Stirling in May. As the conflict continued, Brady, like many members of the King's Party, moved to Leith.

=== Substitute Honours ===
Regent Lennox asked Brady to supply a substitute set of the Honours of Scotland which were needed to hold a Parliament at Stirling. The Honours, "of ancient custom", conveyed a spiritual authenticity to the proceedings. The traditional Crown of Scotland, sword of state and sceptre were inaccessible, held in Edinburgh Castle and used at a rival Queen's Parliament. Mungo Brady was paid for the "fassioun and gilting". Brady and a specialist cutler used mercury or quicksilver to gild the silver items. A craftsman called a "swordslipper" made a scabbard.

Brady delivered the substitutes himself, travelling from Leith by boat on the Forth to Burntisland and then to Stirling by horse. The route was probably chosen for security. The Parliament was held in August 1571 at Stirling Tolbooth, which was decorated with royal tapestry, and James VI attended in person. He was five years old. Brady and his servant stayed in Stirling for 15 days. Descriptions of the Parliament mention the King touched the sceptre to ratify the proceedings.

Stirling was raided by the Queen's Men while the Parliament was still sitting and Lennox was killed. His widow, Margaret Douglas, is thought to have commissioned the famous "Darnley or Lennox jewel" in commemoration, though it is not certain who made this pendant, now displayed at Holyrood Palace.

Brady's Honours were used at a Parliament or Convention in Edinburgh in April 1573, held at the Tolbooth and concluded in Holyrood Palace, after William Kirkcaldy of Grange refused to send the originals out of Edinburgh Castle. The civil war in Scotland concluded in May 1573 with the capture of Edinburgh Castle. The original Honours of Scotland were recovered, hidden in a chest in a vault or "cave". Brady's Honours were presumably melted down. Two goldsmiths, James Mosman and James Cockie, were captured and executed after a trial for treason on 3 August 1573. Brady was a member of the assize.

Mungo Brady was a member of an assize in 1576 at the trial of John Bell, a chapman, accused of circulating counterfeit coins or foreign coins resembling Scottish "hardheads", worth three half pence. There were three other goldsmiths on the assize; George Heriot, John Mosman (brother of James), and James Stalker.

=== King's goldsmith ===
On 16 September 1577, Regent Morton signed an order for the Master of Household to employ Brady as the King's goldsmith, confirmed by privy seal letter on 6 December 1578. Brady made gold rings for the King to give as New Year's Day gifts, and silver-gilt buckles for the King's riding boots. He was paid £20 Scots in November 1578 and £40 Scots in July 1579.
