= James Mosman =

Scottish goldsmith

James Mosman or Mossman (died 1573) was a Scottish goldsmith. He and his son John Mosman were supporters of the cause of Mary, Queen of Scots. James Mosman was executed in 1573 for counterfeiting coins in Edinburgh Castle. John Mosman carried letters for Mary, Queen of Scots, and was under surveillance by Francis Walsingham.

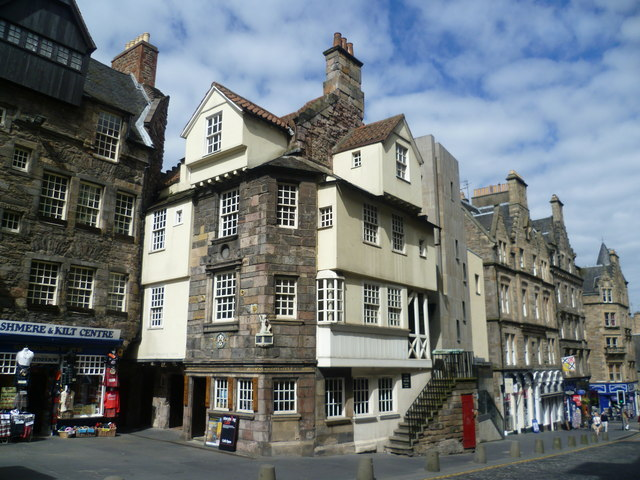
James Mosman rebuilt the John Knox House

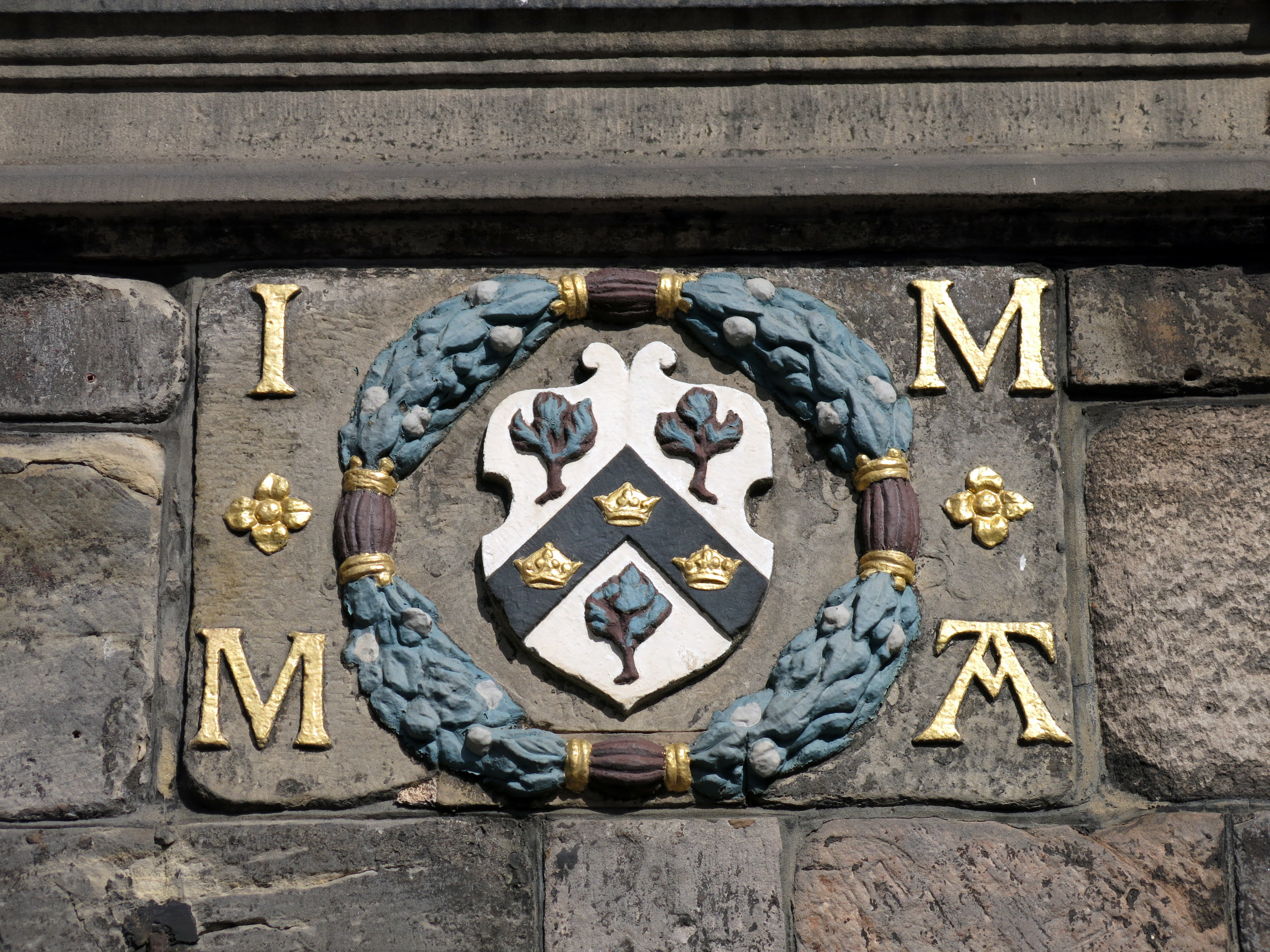
Arms of James Mosman and Mariota Arres on the John Knox House

== Early career in the craft ==
He was a son of John Mosman, a goldsmith working in Edinburgh. He married Mariota Arres, and secondly in 1571, Janet King. Mosman and Arres rebuilt the John Knox House on the High Street in Edinburgh. Moubray House is adjacent to the west. James Mosman was made a free man of the Edinburgh goldsmith craft on 1 May 1557, and as was customary he paid for a banquet. James Cockie was made a free man at the same time, and the event was recorded in the craft minutes by Thomas Ewyn.

Free men of the goldsmith craft were required make an oath and answer an examination. The questions discussed weights and measures in Scottish and English use, and fineness in grains, deniers, and carats. The purpose was to ensure the reputation of the goldsmith's craft and the consistency and worth of gold and silver products made and exchanged. The craft had a body of rules and statutes. These included guidance on pricing works made for a client or "owner" in silver or gold. The craft deacon would help clients and makers agree of the prices of elaborate products, including 'curious works of silver such as goblets, cups, pieces with double colour overgilt, graven or chiselled with antiques [renaissance style ornament], mazer, basin, or laver, eucharist, great crosses, flagons, cruet, chandler [lamp], saltfat [saltcellar] and "trownsam", raised works and overgilt'.

One of the craft records includes a list of materials used by goldsmiths in the 16th century, giving some idea of their use of technology and technique, "hanmilling of all cuilouris (enamel) to be sett under the staines of ringis, subleim argiston, antemonium sublimatum, tent, sandesier, haloume (alum), caperowes (copperas), salpeiter (saltpetre), verdigris, aqua fortus (acid), symound (solder), winstaine, brounstaine (brimstone), saigbanis, croithes, quicksilver, hormalaye (ormolu, a gilding technique)."

Soon after Mosman became a full member of the craft, he and his wife Marion Arres were given permission in May 1557 by Mary of Guise to extend the cellars of another house they owned under the High Street. This house was on the south side of the Royal Mile between houses belonging to Alan Dickson and Richard Hoppar.

On 16 December 1558, Mosman weighed and valued the treasures of St Giles' Kirk including the reliquary of Saint Giles' arm bone. In 1564, the burgh council paid him 40 shillings for a timber staircase removed from the Blackfriar's monastery.

== Mosman and Mary, Queen of Scots ==
James Mosman gained an extra responsibility in the craft in July 1563, when Thomas Ewyn, as Deacon, and the other master goldsmiths elected him box master. The box master was a kind of treasurer, holding the money collected from members of a craft. The craft decided to make a new box for the money with two keys. The craft's hallmark punch would be kept in the box.

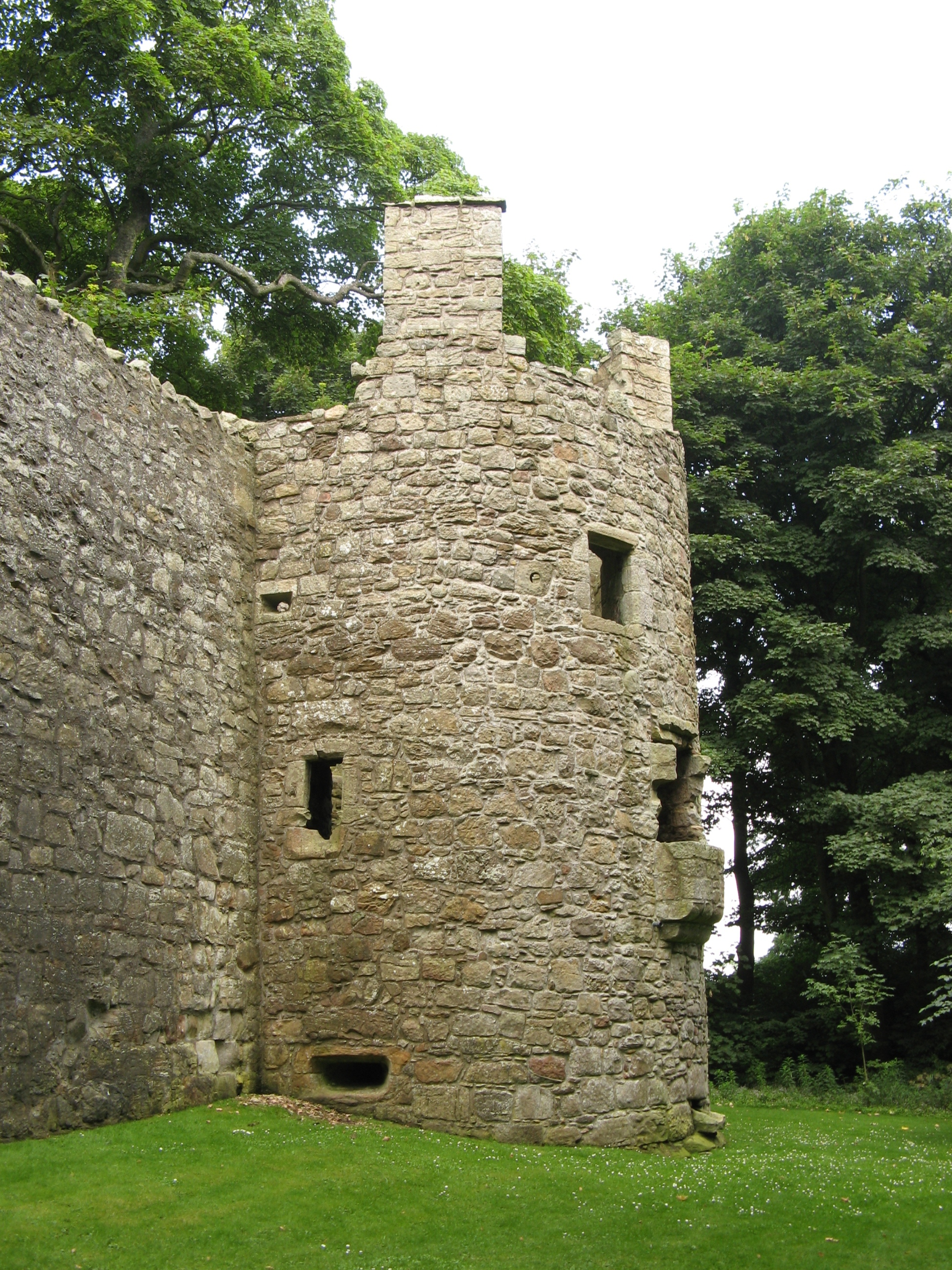
Mosman's work was delivered to Mary, Queen of Scots, at Lochleven Castle in 1567

James Mosman and his workshop made gold chains for Mary, Queen of Scots, to give as diplomatic gifts, and for this work, in 1561, Mary gave his servant workmen a reward of money known as drinksilver. He was an Assay Master at the Scottish mint and made dies for the coinage. Other mint officers included, David Forrest, General of the coin house, Andrew Henderson, warden, John Balfour, comptroller warden, and James Gray, sinker or maker of dies. Grey was another goldsmith, he sold pearls to Mary and refashioned and mended a basin and laver for her.

In April 1566, Mosman sold the queen rings and other pieces which were probably intended as presents to her attendants. In 1567 he was converting a piece of Mary, Queen of Scots' jewelry when she was imprisoned in Lochleven Castle. Mosman gave this chain set with little diamonds, which he was making into a hairband garnishing, to Robert Melville, and his brother Andrew Melville of Garvock took it to the captive queen.

In May 1568, Mosman was made Deacon of the Edinburgh Goldsmith Craft. When Mary was at Bolton Castle in August 1568, her English keeper Francis Knollys mentioned that her household included a goldsmith. Knollys worried that this man might counterfeit seals from wax impressions for forged letters. The identity of this goldsmith is unknown, it may have been Mosman, who could have travelled in England at this time with Andrew Melville, or possibly the French goldsmith "Ginone Loysclener" who worked for Mary in July 1565.

== Currie and Hermiston ==
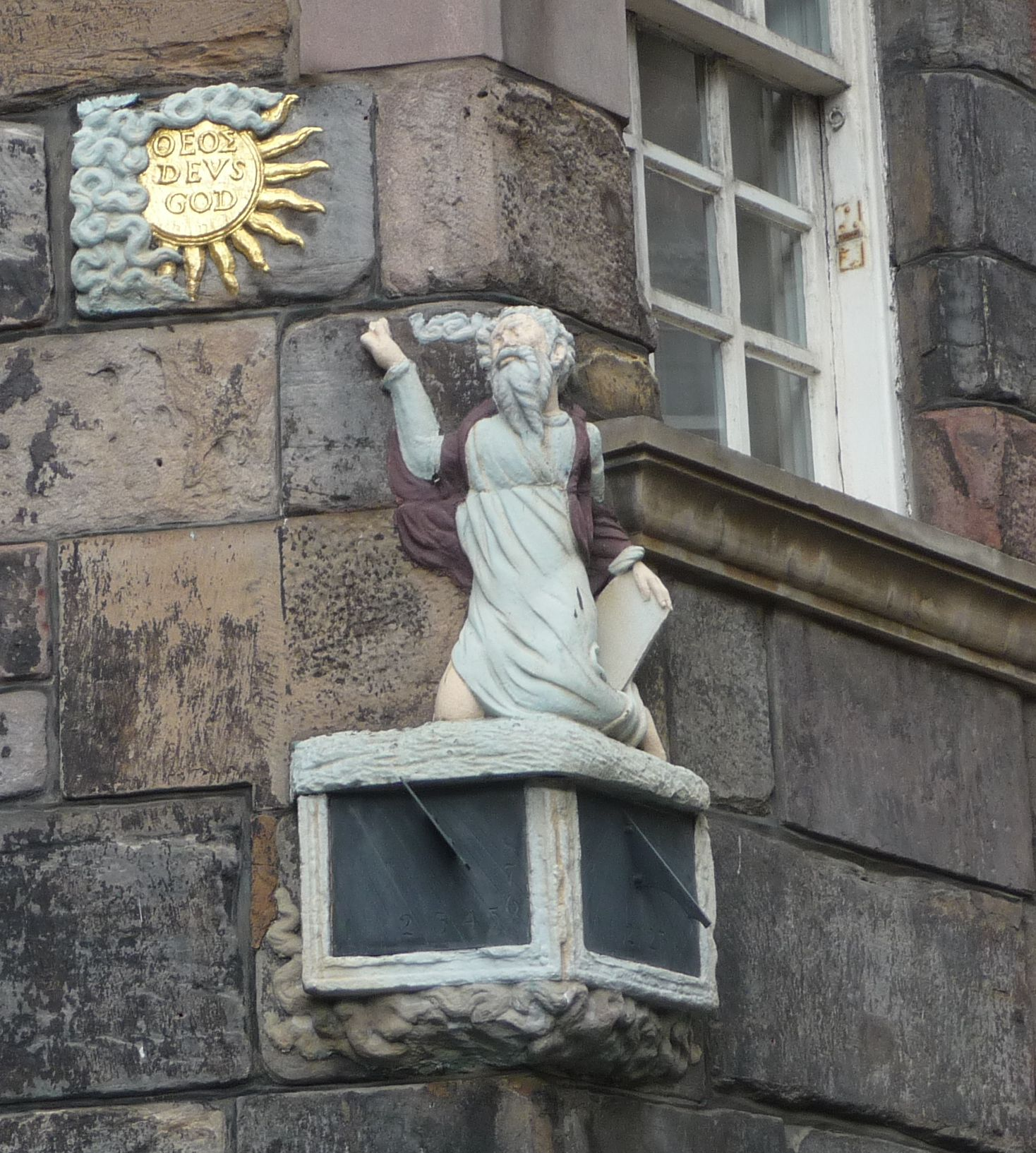
The corner of Mosman's Edinburgh house features a sundial

In 1570, James Mosman and Mariota Arres bought the lands of Currie and Longherdmanston (Hermiston) from Edward Hume and Christine Frog. A royal charter for the property was certified by a relative, the notary "sir" John Mosman who frequently appears in the registers of royal grants. He was also clerk of court of the Admiralty of Scotland. His title "sir" was a courtesy title used by Scottish graduates. He was described as a notary in the diocese of Glasgow in 1548. It is often said that James Mosman the goldsmith was knighted in 1565, and used the title "Sir", but there is no evidence for this, the charters record him as an Edinburgh burgess.

The charter for Currie also mentions a sasine of another goldsmith Nicolas Sym. Some of these lands were forfeited in 1573, but were recovered by John Mosman, the goldsmith's son, who sold them to James Forrester of Corstorphine in 1582.

Mariota Arres died in 1571, and soon after James Mosman married Janet King. She was a daughter of Alexander King, an Edinburgh advocate.

== Marian Civil War ==
James Mosman remained loyal to Mary when she was exiled in England. He worked in Edinburgh Castle with another goldsmith James Cockie making coins for Mary's supporters who held the castle during the "Lang Siege" of the Marian Civil War. Cockie and Mosman were relations by marriage. On 21 March 1572/3, Mosman was at Morham, a witness to the will of Agnes Sinclair, Countess of Bothwell, mother of Patrick Hepburn, 3rd Earl of Bothwell.

The two goldsmiths helped raise money for the Captain of the castle, William Kirkcaldy of Grange, on the security of the jewels of Mary, Queen of Scots, which were used as pledges for loans from her supporters. Mosman may have been a Catholic, as some of Mary's supporters in the castle were. As the crisis continued, Mosman lost his job as Master of the Royal Assay at the mint in April 1572, and his property was declared forfeit at a meeting of Parliament at Holyrood Palace on 30 April 1573. Regent Morton later wrote that Mosman and Cockie "made the conterfeit money".

Mosman and his colleagues set up an alternative mint in the castle to coin silver, while Regent Morton minted coins at Dalkeith. The chronicle known as the Diurnal of Occurrents says that the coins minted in the castle were finer in silver content than the Dalkeith money, which undercut the castle operation.

On the day the castle fell to an English army led by William Drury, many of Mary's jewels were in Mosman's hands as pledges, and he passed them to Kirkcaldy of Grange, who placed them in a chest wrapped in a cloth, "an evill favored clowte", or in his hose.

Mosman and Cockie were executed on 3 August 1573, following a trial at the Palace of Holyroodhouse. They were taken up the High Street in a cart. facing backwards. Mosman, William Kirkcaldy, his brother James Kirkcaldy, and James Cockie, were hanged, and their heads were set on spikes on the castle. Mosman's receipts for loans noting the weight of some of Mary's jewels are held by the National Records of Scotland.

Another goldsmith, Mungo Brady, was involved their trial in 1573, and he was appointed goldsmith to James VI in September 1577. Mosman seems to have entrusted a sum of money to the soldier Andrew Lambie, Captain of Linlithgow Palace in May 1573, intending him to give it to his father-in-law, the lawyer Alexander King. The arrangement was that King would hold the money for Barbara Troupe and her sister Margaret. When Barbara complained she had not received any money to the Edinburgh magistrates, Lambie said he was not under their jurisdiction because he was a royal servant. The Privy Council ordered that the magistrates and Provost of Edinburgh should hear the case.

Mosman's property was forfeited for a time, and granted to John Carmichael, younger of that Ilk, who was a trusted lieutenant of Regent Morton. His son John Mosman, Janet King, and James Cockie's children were given pacifications by the Parliament of Scotland in October 1581.

== John Mosman, elder and younger ==
Another Edinburgh goldsmith, known at the time as John Mosman the elder, was his brother. John Mosman the younger, (the son of James Mosman (died 1573), had to make a piece to demonstrate his skills to become a master of the craft. His first submission was not his best work, and he was asked in March 1575 to make another, of the "trimmest fashion". John Mosman the elder's 1565 submission had received the same feedback.

Both John Mosman elder and younger were called with colleagues of the craft before the Privy Council in June 1576 to discuss the election of Michael Gilbert as Deacon of the Edinburgh Goldsmith Craft. The other goldsmiths who attended were Mungo Bradie, Nicoll Sym, Michael Sym, and Adam Allan. The decision was made that Adam Craig would assist Michael Gilbert to carry out the Deacon's duties.

A communion cup made by John Mosman in 1585, (probably the elder), used at Rosneath Kirk survives, and is held by the National Museums of Scotland. John Mosman's stock of jewellery, and the collection of his late wife Susanna Wilson, listed in 1593, included a "tablet" or locket with the portraits of James VI and Anne of Denmark valued at £57 Scots and earrings described in the Scots language as "four hingeris for luggis". An earlier will inventory, made at the death of his first wife Katherine Sym in 1586, includes unset diamonds, rubies, sapphires, turquoises, pearls, and garnets.

== John Mosman and Walsingham ==
John Mosman, James Mosman's son, was sometimes known as "John Mosman younger" to distinguish him from an uncle. He carried a letter to John Lauder at Sheffield, a member of Queen Mary's household, from his father James Lauder, a court musician, in October 1582. He also wrote to John Lauder from London, asking him to reply and tell him if Queen Mary was not planning to benefit him. In November he wrote to Mary asking for a reward as the son of her "grace's master coiner and true subject", enough to start a trade and support his brothers and sisters. He had previously sent her an account of outstanding sums she owed his father James Mosman (died 1573). John Mosman had spent four months in London waiting for a reply from Mary and spent all his money, despite the recent sale of his lands at Currie.

John Mosman was interviewed in London by the Scottish poet and spy William Fowler, who found him plain and simple and fit only for carrying letters. He became involved with the correspondence of the French ambassador Michel de Castelnau and was monitored by Francis Walsingham. Despite Fowler's low opinion of his skills, Walsingham intercepted a number of letters in March 1583 which referred to Mosman's verbal reports, and he wished that Mosman had been arrested as a "bad instrument". Fowler advised Walsingham that Mosman could be caught carrying letters of Mary, Queen of Scots, and the French diplomat La Mothe Fénelon in a ship at Gravesend.

An English diplomat in Scotland, William Davison reported that Mosman carried letters for Maineville, a French diplomat in Edinburgh. The English ambassador in Scotland, Robert Bowes wrote to Walsingham in June 1583 that John Mosman was ready to go by "privily by land to London, with good store of letters" for Michel de Castelnau. Mosman knew that Bowes was watching him.

Coded letters mentioning Mary's intention to reward John Mosman with 100 Écu were discovered in the Bibliothèque nationale de France and deciphered in 2023.
