= Mary King's Close =

Underground streets and tourist attraction in Edinburgh

Coordinates: 55°57′01″N 3°11′25″W

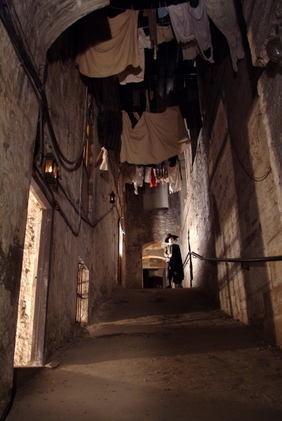
Mary King's Close

Mary King's Close is a historic close located under the Edinburgh City Chambers building on the Royal Mile, in the historic Old Town area of Edinburgh, Scotland. It took its name from one Mary King, a merchant burgess who resided on the Close in the 17th century. The close was partially demolished and buried due to the building of the Royal Exchange in the year 1753, and later closed to the public for many years. The area became shrouded in myths and urban legends; tales of hauntings and murders abounded. In 1897, Andrew Chesney, the last resident remaining in Mary King's close, was given a compulsory purchase order for £400 and he left the close in 1902.

The close is currently operated as a tourist attraction by Continuum Attractions.

== Hauntings ==
Mary King's Close has had a reputation for hauntings since at least the 17th century, with several paranormal investigations taking place. It has been pointed out that this particular Close ran the nearest of any to the old Nor Loch, a stagnant and highly polluted marsh; biogas escaping into the close and creating eerie lights may have been the cause for these rumours of spirit hauntings. It is also said that the gas escaping into the closes was known to cause hallucinations.

- Mary King's Close was featured on Series 4 of Most Haunted.
- Featured in Haunted History's episode "Haunted Edinburgh"
- A 2004 television adaptation of Ian Rankin's Inspector Rebus novel Mortal Causes, the fourth episode in the first series of Rebus, featured a murder whose victim was found in Mary King's Close.
- Annie's room and Mary King's Close both appear in Episode 6 of Billy Connolly's World Tour of Scotland.
- Mary King's Close appears on the History Channel's 2007 program Cities of the Underworld Episode "Scotland's Sin City".
- Mary King's Close was also featured on the Discovery Channel India show Discovery's Biggest Shows (aired at 8:00 pm Indian Standard Time on Sunday, 7 October 2007)
- Mary King's Close was also featured in an episode of Ghost Hunters International which first aired in the U.S. on 9 January 2008 on the Sci Fi Channel and in the UK on 1 June 2008 on Living2.
- Mary King's Close was featured on the Discovery Kids original series Mystery Hunters on the episode "King's Close and Winchester House".
- Mary King's Close was featured on an episode of Lost World "Jekyl and Hyde" History International (2007).
- Mary King's Close was used to test the low light capabilities of two digital compact system cameras in The Gadget Show (Season 17 Episode 9) aired in the UK on 7 January 2013 on Channel 5 (UK).

== References in literature ==
In Ian Rankin's 1994 novel Mortal Causes, a body is found in Mary King's Close.

Mary King's Close is the setting for the teen novel Crow Boy written by Philip Caveney and published by Scottish-based publisher Fledgling Press in November 2012.

In Alexander McCall Smith's 2015 novel The Revolving Door Of Life, the Duke of Johannesburg and a friend hide in the close when they are evading the Marchmont Herald.

Mary King's Close is a location in the 2018 teen novel City of Ghosts, the first book in the Cassidy Blake series by V.E. Schwab.

== See also ==
- Royal Mile
- Black Death
- Plague doctor
