= James Cockie =

Scottish goldsmith (died 1573)

James Cockie (died 1573) was a goldsmith in Edinburgh. He helped mint coins in Edinburgh Castle during the Marian Civil War and was hanged as a counterfeiter on 3 August 1573.

The surname was also spelled "Cokie" and "Cokkie", "Cokke", or "Cok". The family were prominent in Edinburgh as goldsmiths. He was born around 1535, and his father was also called James Cockie.

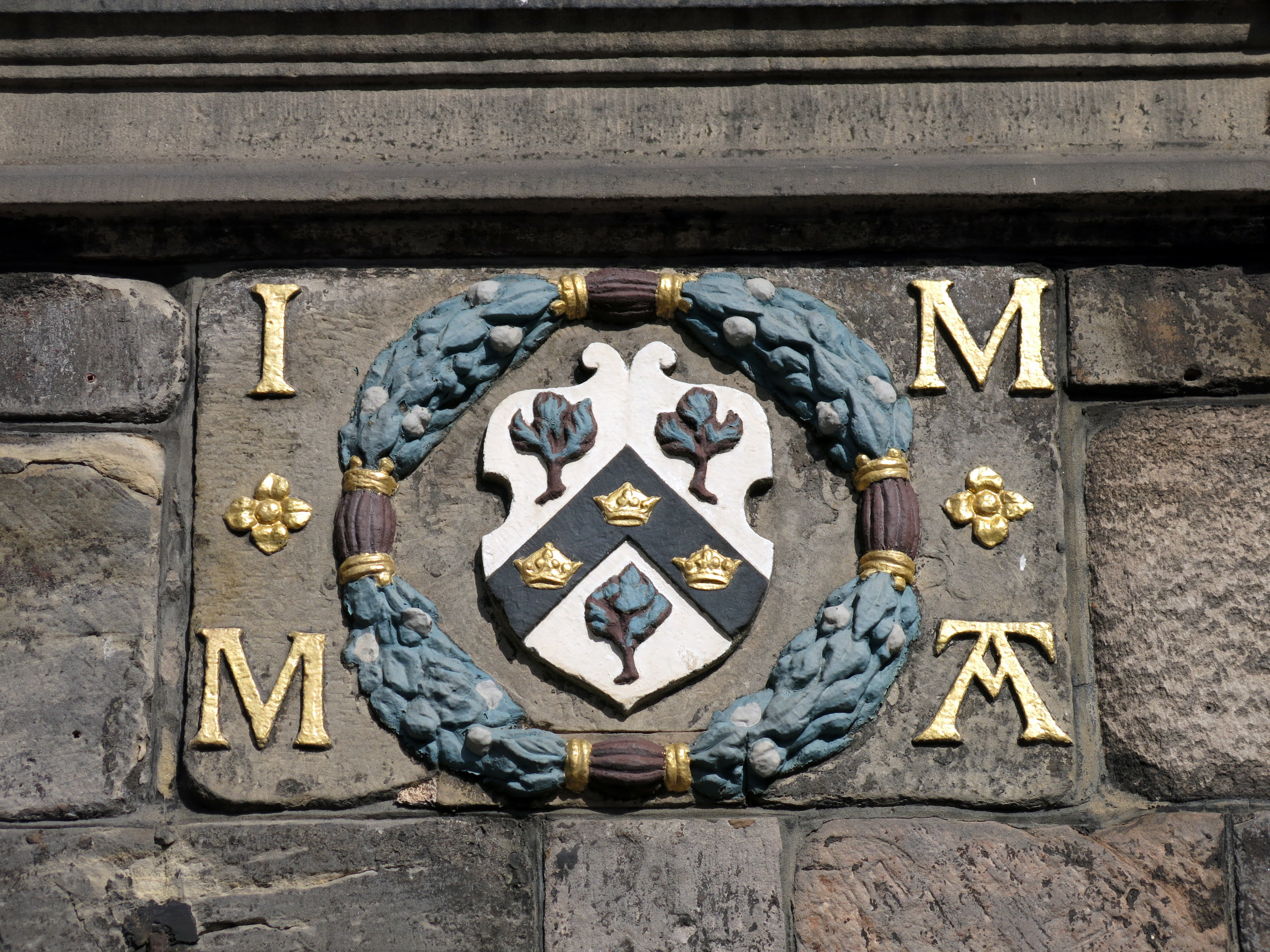
Arms of James Cockie's in-laws James Mossman and Marion Arres on the "John Knox House" Edinburgh

== Career ==
James Cockie and James Mosman were made free men of the Edinburgh incorporation of goldsmiths on 1 May 1557. In 1558, he made and engraved a clock case for Mary of Guise (the "making graving of ane horologe of lettone") and also worked in Edinburgh castle casting a cannon called a "double falcon" with the Queen's arms and motto.

Cockie married John Arres' daughter. She was a sister of James Mosman's wife – Marion Arres. Through his marriage, Mosman obtained the house on Edinburgh's High Street which is now known as the John Knox House.

=== Rebellion and Reformation ===
At the Scottish Reformation, in 1560 Cockie gave evidence to Henri Cleutin and Jacques de la Brosse against the Protestant Lords of the Congregation. They described him as a maker and engraver of coins. According to his sworn statement, the Earl of Arran had ordered him to come to his lodging (in November 1559) and requested that he engrave a signet or seal matrix with the arms of Mary, Queen of Scots and Francis II of France and irons for making coins. Arran was thought to have issued letters with a false seal to promote the rebellion against Mary of Guise.

Cockie said that he had at first refused Arran's requests, alleging that he was not used to this kind of work, and also would need an order from the Queen Regent, Mary of Guise. He subsequently worked on a die for a coins with a crown and the motto "Verbum Dei." Witnesses said that Mary of Guise had obtained some of the new coins minted by Cockie at Arran's order. When the Congregation left Edinburgh, he gave the dies to the mint official John Acheson.

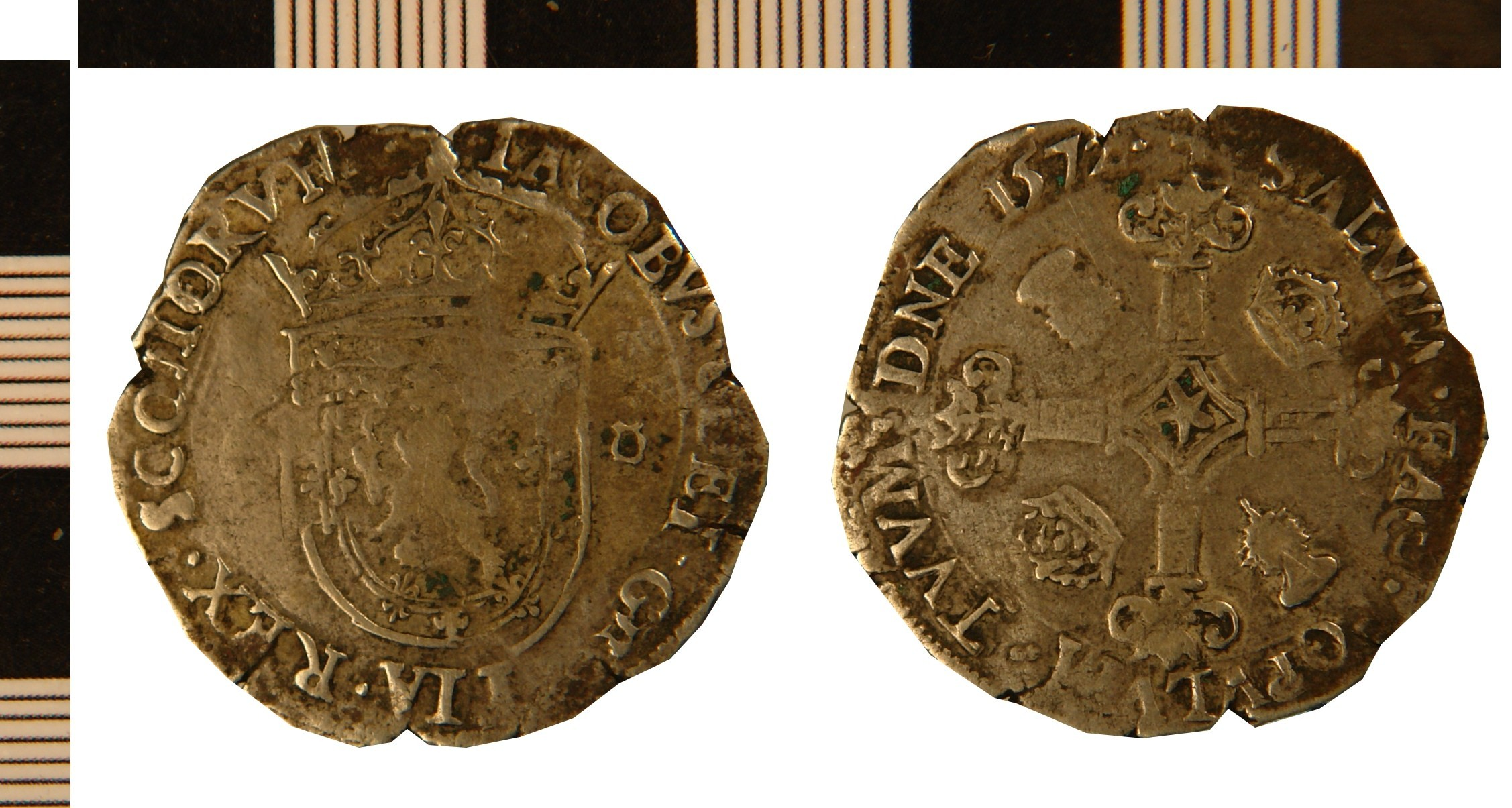
A Scottish silver half merk minted in 1572

=== Marian Civil War ===
Cockie and Mossman joined William Kirkcaldy of Grange in Edinburgh Castle on 11 May 1571. They had chosen to support Kirkcaldy who held the castle for Mary, Queen of Scots during the Marian Civil War.

Mossman and Cockie helped Kirkcaldy pledge the queen's jewels, which had been stored in the castle, for loans. Cockie, as archival evidence shows, was particularly involved in receiving silver and minting coins in the castle. The coins minted in the castle were said to be finer in silver content than those minted at Dalkeith by the opposition. According to the Diurnal of Occurrents coins with high silver content were purchased at a premium in Leith and sent abroad. If this were so, the difference would not have offered the castle garrison any particular benefit. The types included the eighty pence piece or half merk, known as a "six and eight." In June 1572, the English soldier and Marshall of Berwick William Drury sent one of Cockie's half merks to William Cecil as a novelty.

Robert Lindsay of Pitscottie, the author of a chronicle, mentioned that Cockie minted coins in Edinburgh castle, "ane that struik the cunzie callit Cok". Regent Morton wrote that Mosman and Cockie "made the conterfeit money", and he tried to negotiate with Grange to stop the coining and circulation of the "adulterat and corrupt" money.

After the castle fell, Cockie, James Mossman, William Kirkcaldy of Grange, and his brother James Kirkcaldy were hanged on 3 August 1573. Their heads were displayed on the castle walls.

James Cockie and James Kirkcaldy were tried together for treason at Holyrood House before the executions. Another goldsmith Mungo Brady was a member of the assize.

== A family of goldsmiths ==
William Cockie or Cokky, his brother and second son of James Cockie senior, a goldsmith, was made a burgess of Edinburgh in July 1562. He had a house in the Canongate at the "lapley stone". The house burnt down in 1608 when his son, Archibald Cockie was living there.

In 1581 his son, later a goldsmith, also named James Cockie was restored to his inheritance by the Parliament of Scotland. The burgh council acknowledged this, noting that his father had occupied "the westmost goldsmith booth, except one, lying under the old Tolbooth on the south side".

== The Earl of Mar's ewer ==
The National Museums of Scotland has a jug or ewer made of rock crystal with silver-gilt mounts which are thought to be the work of James Cockie and his workshop. The ewer mounts were made in Edinburgh in the reign of Mary, Queen of Scots and the lid was engraved with the heraldry of John Erskine and Annabell Murray, Countess of Mar. Erskine became Earl of Mar in 1565. The Deacon of the Goldsmiths who assayed the silver work was George Heriot.

Another ewer of silver or tortoise-shell with silver mounts, said to have been a gift to the Earl of Mar from Queen Elizabeth at the time of the baptism of James VI, was destroyed in the fire at Alloa Tower in August 1801. Elizabeth also gave Mar a silver and mother of pearl basin and laver during his embassy to London in 1601 when the secret correspondence was arranged. These objects are sometimes confused with the crystal ewer.

A silver cup made by Henry Thomson used at Forgue has Cockie's assay mark as Deacon in 1563. The cup was presented to the church in 1633 by James Crichton of Frendraught.
