= John Knox House =

Architectural structure in City of Edinburgh, Scotland

Coordinates: 55°57′2.14″N 3°11′6.26″W

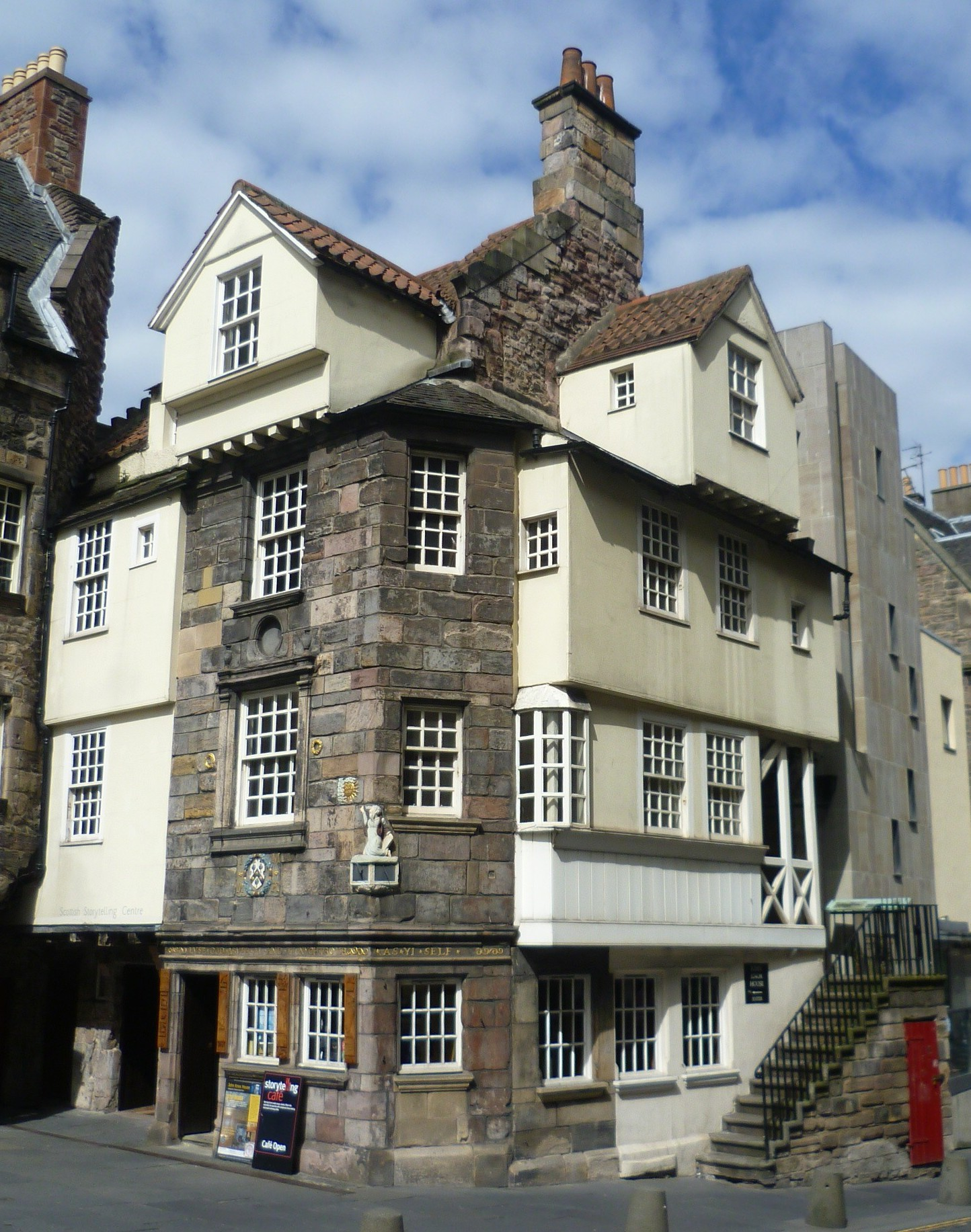

- Location within Scotland
- Location: Scottish Storytelling Centre, High St, Edinburgh EH1 1SR, United Kingdom
- Type: Historic house
- Website: https://www.scottishstorytellingcentre.com/john-knox-house/

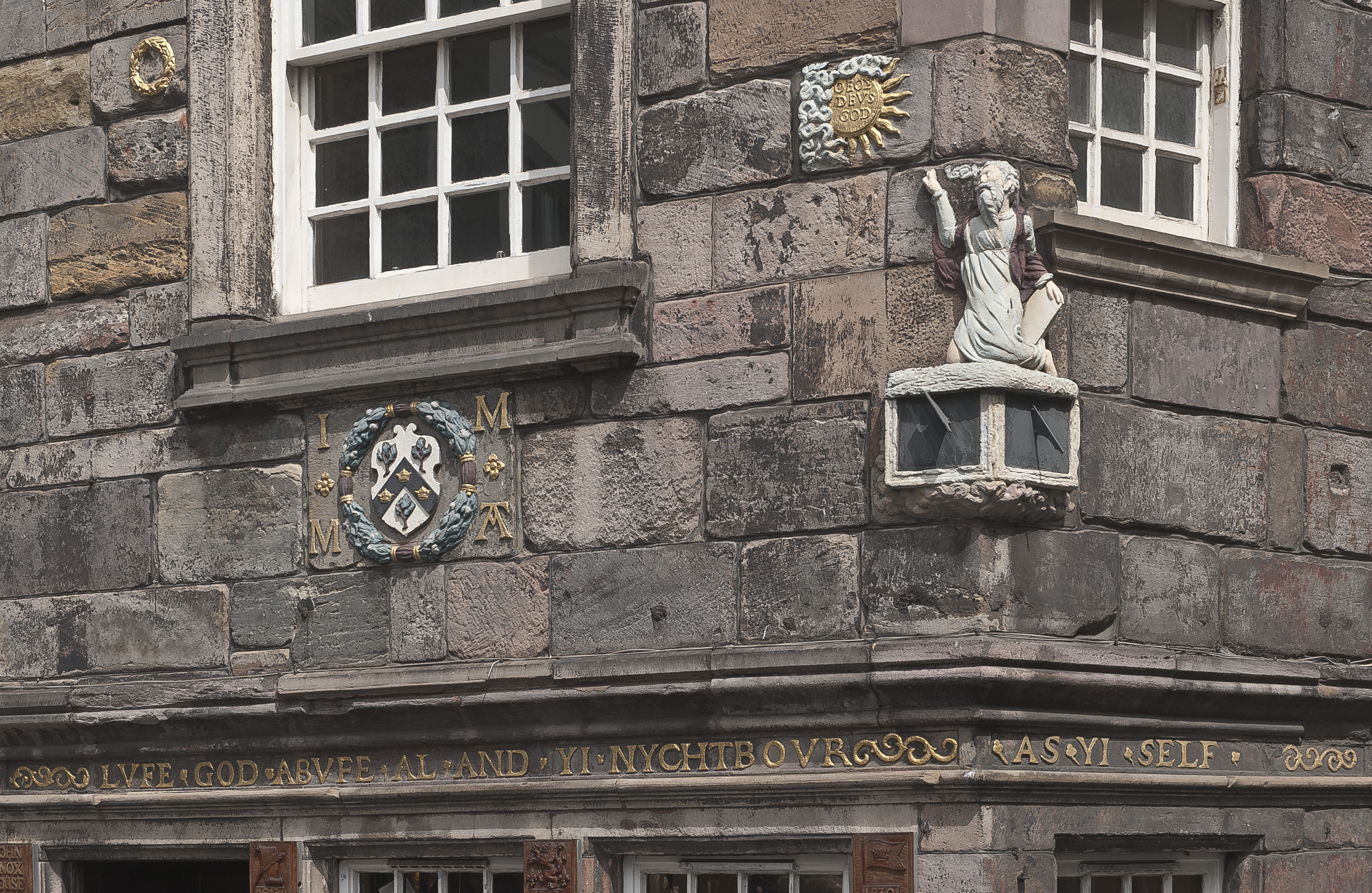
Details of the façade

John Knox House, popularly known as John Knox's House, is a historic house in Edinburgh, Scotland, reputed to have been owned and lived in by Protestant reformer John Knox during the 16th century. Although his name became associated with the house, he appears to have lived in Warriston Close where a plaque indicates the approximate site of his actual residence.

== History ==
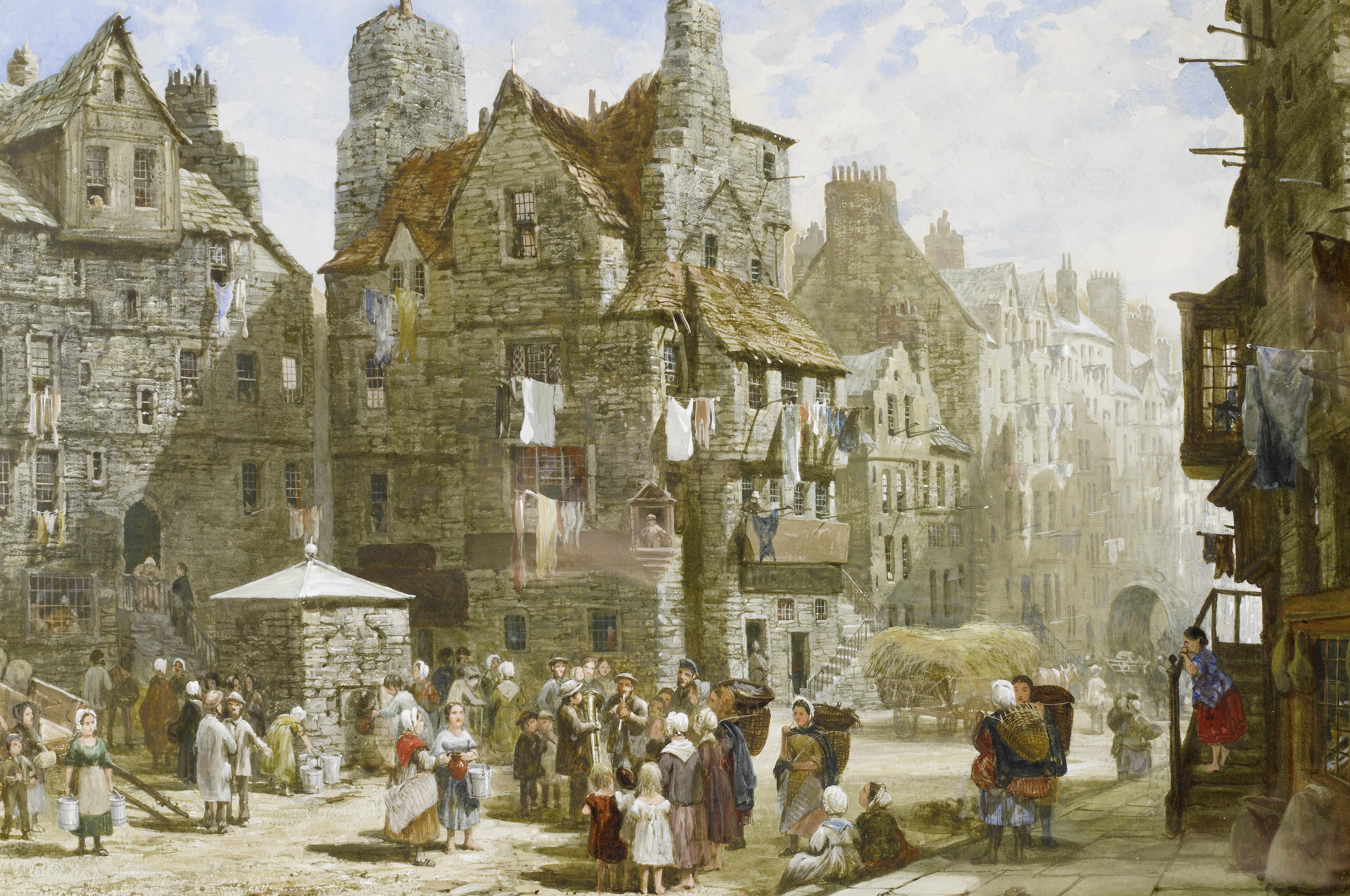
John Knox's House, painted by Louise Rayner c. 1861

The house itself was built from 1470, featuring a fine wooden gallery and hand-painted ceiling. It had belonged to Walter Reidpath whose grandson John Arres inherited it and left it to his daughter Mariota Arres in 1556. She married James Mosman, a goldsmith. Her father-in-law John Mosman, also a goldsmith, had refashioned the crown of Scotland for James V.

In 1567 James Mosman was converting a piece of Mary, Queen of Scots' jewellery when she was imprisoned in Lochleven Castle. He remained loyal to Mary when she was exiled in England. Mosman worked in Edinburgh Castle with James Cockie making coins for Mary's supporters who held the castle during the 'Lang Siege'. The two goldsmiths valued the jewels of Mary, Queen of Scots which remained in the castle, so they could be used as security for loans.

When the Castle surrendered in August 1573, Mosman was charged with counterfeiting, for which he was hanged, quartered and beheaded. The house was forfeit for the treachery, and was given in the name of James VI of Scotland to James Carmichael younger of that ilk.

The stone carvings on the street facades commissioned by James Mosmanand Mariota Arres were rediscovered behind woodwork in 1849, and restored in 1850 by Alexander Handyside Ritchie. They depict Moses on Mount Sinai and include the motto "Luve God above al and yi nychtbor as yersel".

Over the next few centuries many decorations and paintings were added, and the house and its contents are now a museum. The building is owned by the Church of Scotland and is now administered as part of the new, adjacent Scottish Storytelling Centre.

== Association with John Knox ==
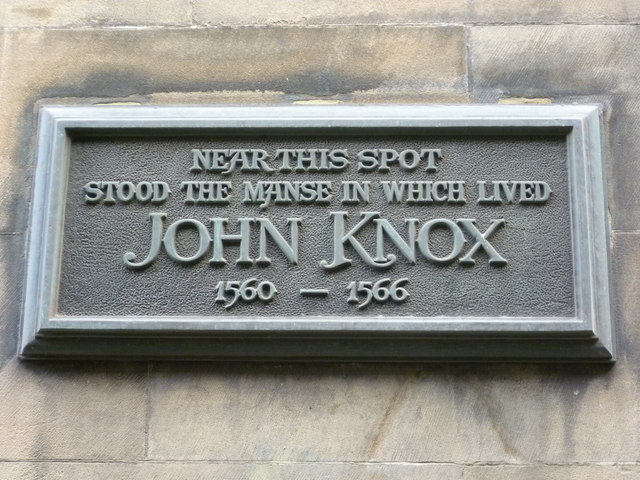
Warriston Close plaque

The visitor's pamphlet states that the house "was Knox's home only for a few months during the siege of Edinburgh Castle, but it is believed that he died here." It appears to have become widely accepted as "John Knox's House" from the mid-19th century onwards after Victorian writers like Robert Chambers and Sir Daniel Wilson had repeated the popular tradition, first recorded c.1800, of attaching Knox's name to it. The house looked old enough to fit the description, but no research was able to establish the rights or wrongs of the claim. Because of its visual prominence, however, it is almost certain that the building would have been familiar to Knox. The location of his actual residence is marked by a plaque in Warriston Close which lies further up the slope of the High Street. After the Disruption in the Church of Scotland in 1843, the house was bought by the new Free Church, a fact which may have strengthened belief in its association with Knox. It was condemned and due for demolition by the Town Council in 1849 but saved through the efforts of the pioneering urban conservationist Lord Cockburn.

The building immediately adjacent on the west side of the house is Moubray House. Its owner Robert Moubray also happened to be the owner of the house in Warriston's Close where Knox lodged in the 1560s.

== Wellhead ==
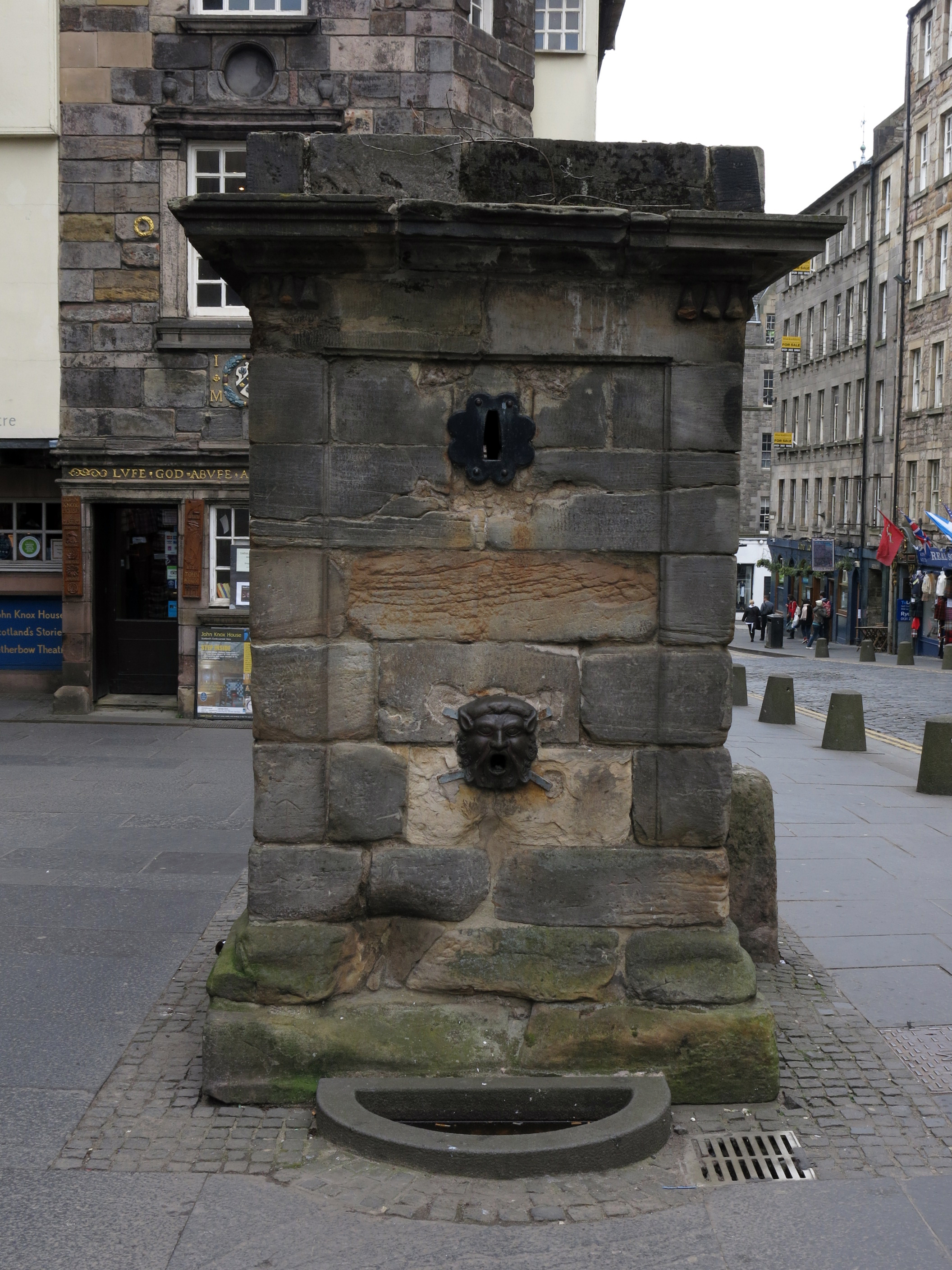
Wellhead

Fountain Well also known Netherbow or Canmore, is located just outside John Knox House. The street well is one of the last surviving public cisterns built in 1675, supplying drinking water to local inhabitants. It was designed by Sir William Bruce and built by the King’s Master mason, Robert Mylne - it has been rebuilt numerous times, most recently in 1997.

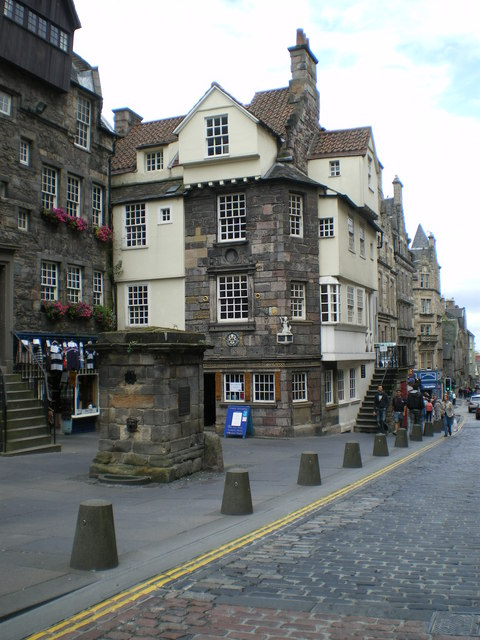
Wellhead outside John Knox House

== See also ==
- Moubray House
- James Tytler
- Ranger's Impartial List of Ladies of Pleasure
