= Dorothea Stewart, Countess of Gowrie =

Scottish aristocrat

Dorothea Stewart, Countess of Gowrie (died after 1600) was a Scottish aristocrat. The dates of the birth and death of Dorothea Stewart are unknown.

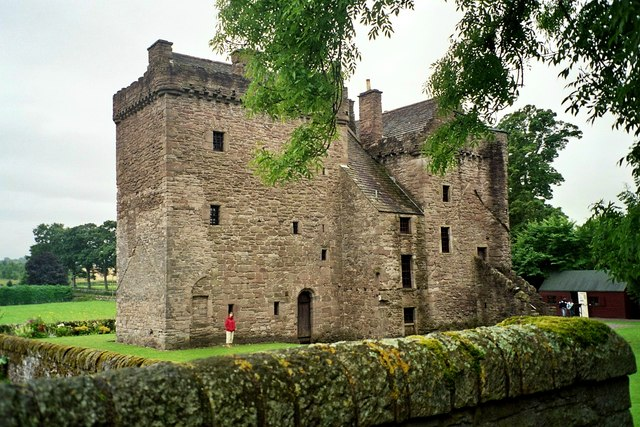
Ruthven Castle, now known as Huntingtower

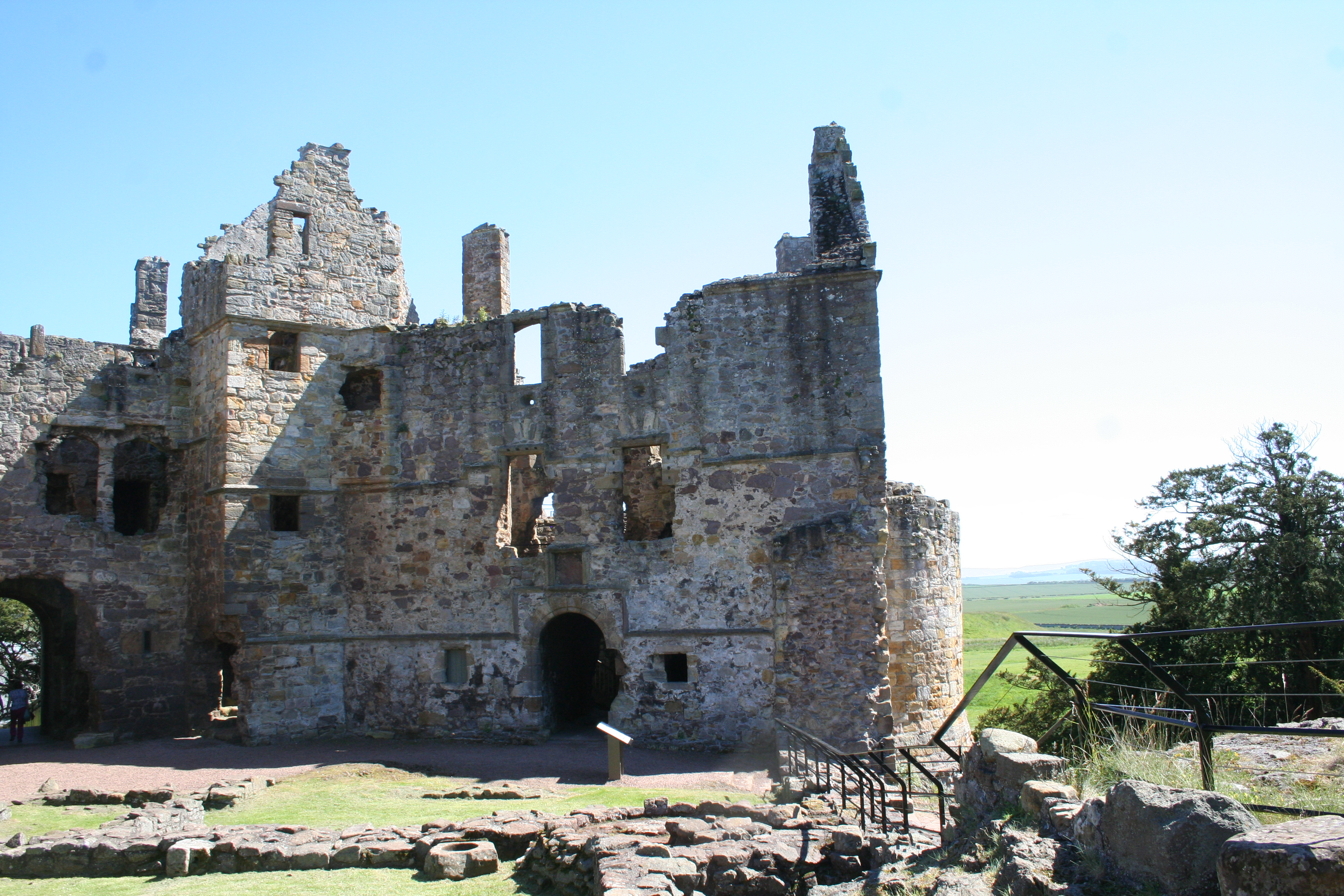
Dirleton Castle, exterior of the Gowrie lodging

== Early life ==
She was the oldest daughter of Henry Stewart, 1st Lord Methven and Janet Stewart, daughter of John Stewart, 2nd Earl of Atholl and Janet Campbell. Her siblings were Henry Stewart, 2nd Lord Methven, Margaret Stewart, Mistress of Ochiltree, and Joan Stewart, Countess of Argyll.

19th-century writers examined the possibility that Dorothea Stewart was the daughter of Margaret Tudor, or her granddaughter and daughter of a Master of Methven, said to have been killed at the battle of Pinkie in 1547.

== Married life ==
Dorothea Stewart married William, Master of Ruthven on 17 August 1561 at Perth. The parish register suggests it was a double wedding, her half-sister, Elizabeth Kennedy (died 1572), the daughter of Janet Stewart and Hugh Kennedy of Girvanmains, married Patrick Vans on the same day. Later, the Mistress of Ochiltree referred to Patrick Vaus of Barnbarroch in her letters as her "brother". He was the spouse of her half-sister.

William Ruthven became Lord Ruthven and was later made Earl of Gowrie. Their main home was Huntingtower Castle near Perth, then known as Ruthven Castle. The name Ruthven was pronounced "Ryven".

In October 1570 for her "terce" or jointure lands, Ruthven gave her Dirleton Castle and a third of the lands of Dirleton and Hassington, Haliburton, Ballernoch, Newton, and Cousland.

== Adversity in 1584 ==
Her husband, the Earl of Gowrie, was executed for treason in May 1584 at Stirling. Dorothea Stewart was commanded to surrender Dirleton, Ruthven, Cousland, and the Gowrie lodging in Perth to the crown.

On the last day of the Parliament, on 22 August 1584, Dorothea Stewart knelt down on the High Street crying to the king for grace for her children. James Stewart, Earl of Arran pushed her away, and she fainted and was left on the street. The event was described in detail a letter written by William Davison, who says that she was ordered to leave her lodging after making a plea in Parliament on the previous day:

The poor lady, ... being led forth into the open street, and stayed there, his highness passing by, ... where falling on her knees and beseeching his majesty's compassion, Arran, going betwixt her and the King, led him hastily by her, and she, reaching at his cloak to stay his majesty, Arran putting her from him, did not only overthrow her, which was easy to do, in respect of the poor lady's weakness, but marched over her, who partly with extreme grief, and partly with weakness, swooned presently in the open street, and was fain to be conveyed into one of the next houses, where with much ado they recovered the life of her.

== Later life ==
Dirleton Castle and other properties were restored to Lady Gowrie and her family. A disgraced courtier, William Keith of Delny stayed at her house adjacent to Holyrood Palace in July 1590. There were plans in 1591 for Dorothea Stewart to marry William Keith of Delny but James VI forbade it. In July 1593 the house attracted suspicion when it was used to access the palace during the Earl of Bothwell's second Raid of Holyrood.

Dorothea Stewart and her second husband Andrew Kerr of Faldonsyde complained in 1597 about a group of local men who stole rabbits from the links of Dirleton and terrorised her tenants.

After the slaughter of her family at Perth on 5 August 1600, the Master of Orkney and Sir James Sandilands rode to Dirleton to arrest her two surviving sons, Patrick and William. They told Lady Gowrie her sons would be kept by Chancellor, the Earl of Montrose, a proposition which caused her great and visible distress, even though Montrose was the father-in-law of her daughter Margaret. The two young men were riding to safety in England.

She was still living at Dirleton in November 1600. She hoped that the king could be persuaded to support her daughters, "quhais estait is verie desolait" and she was not able to help them herself. A part of the ruined castle is known as the Gowrie lodging.

== Family ==
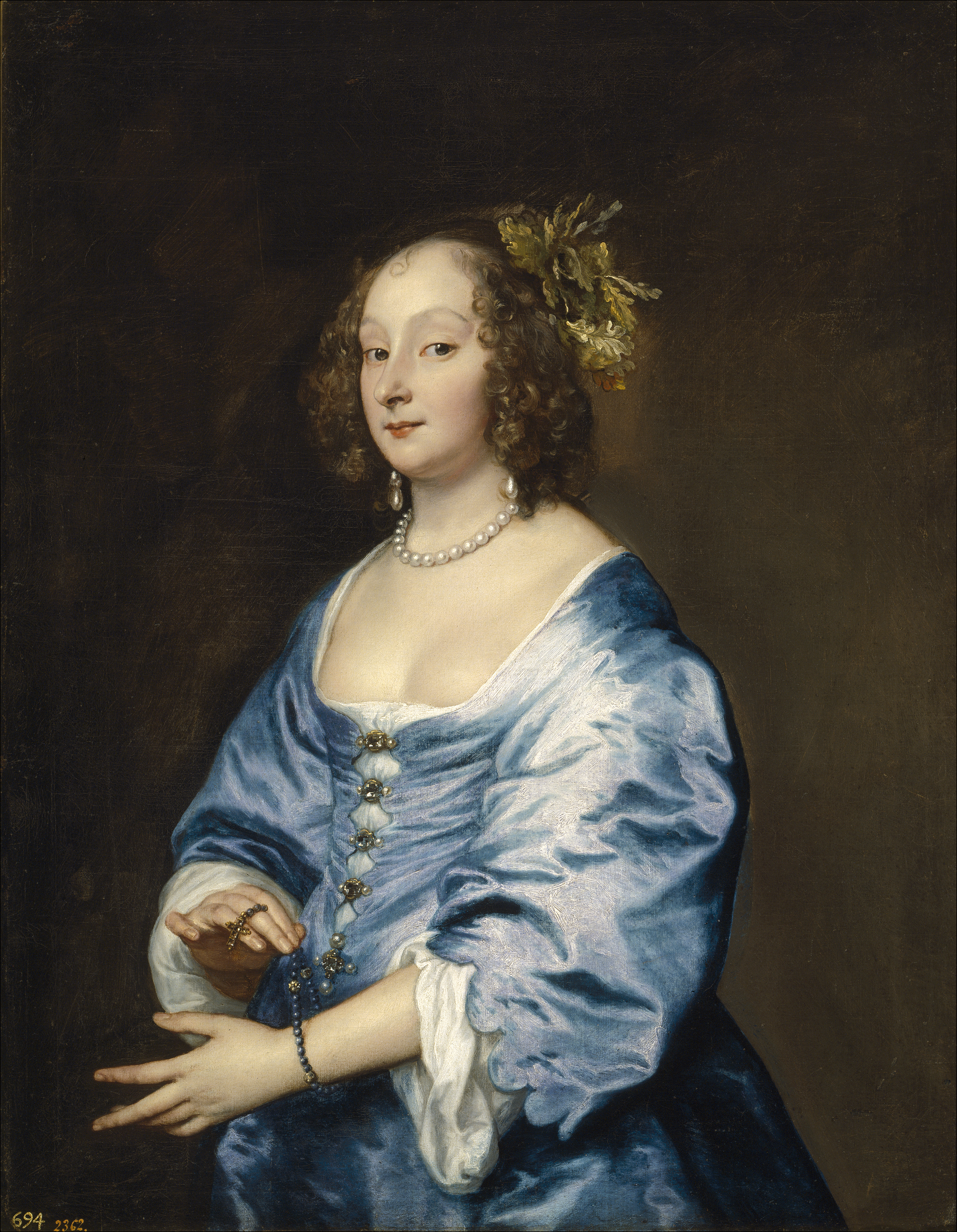
Mary Ruthven, Anthony van Dyck, Museo del Prado

Dorothea Stewart's children included:

- James Ruthven, 2nd Earl of Gowrie (died 1588)
- John Ruthven, 3rd Earl of Gowrie (died 1600)
- Alexander Ruthven (died 1600)
- William Ruthven
- Patrick Ruthven, who was imprisoned in the Tower of London. He was the father of Mary Ruthven, who married the painter Anthony van Dyck.
- Mary Ruthven, who married (1) John Stewart, 5th Earl of Atholl, and (2) John Stewart, 1st Earl of Atholl (1566–1603)
- Margaret Ruthven, who married John Graham, 4th Earl of Montrose, and was the mother of James Graham, 1st Marquess of Montrose
- Sophia Ruthven (died 1592), who, despite the wishes of James VI, married Ludovic Stewart, 2nd Duke of Lennox on 20 April 1591, the day after he released her from imprisonment at Wemyss Castle.
- Jean Ruthven, who married James Ogilvy, 1st Earl of Airlie
- Elizabeth or Isobel Ruthven, who married (1) Robert Gordon of Lochinvar, and was mother of John Gordon, 1st Viscount of Kenmure, and (2) Hugh Campbell of Loudon (died 1622).
- Beatrix Ruthven, lady in waiting to Anne of Denmark, wife of John Home of Cowdenknowes
- Lilias Ruthven, about whom little is known, the English ambassador wrote she was "dead also with sorrow" after her father's execution in May 1584.
- Dorothea, who married John Wemyss of Pittencrieff
- Barbara Ruthven, lady in waiting to Anne of Denmark
