= Margaret Stewart, Mistress of Ochiltree =

Courtier in the household of Anne of Denmark in Scotland (died 1627)

Margaret Stewart Mistress of Ochiltree
- Died: 1627
- Spouses: Andrew Stewart, Master of Ochiltree (m. 1567; died 1578): Uchtred Macdowall of Garthland
- Children: Andrew Stuart, 1st Baron Castle Stuart; Josias Stewart of Bonington; Mary Stewart; Anne Stewart; Jean Stewart, Lady Bargany; Margaret Stewart; Martha Stewart
- Parents: Henry Stewart, 1st Lord Methven (father); Janet Stewart, Lady Ruthven (mother)

Margaret Stewart, Mistress of Ochiltree (died 1627) was a courtier in the household of Anne of Denmark in Scotland and looked after her children Prince Henry, Princess Elizabeth, and Charles.

== Career ==
Margaret was the daughter of Henry Stewart, 1st Lord Methven and Janet Stewart, daughter of John Stewart, 2nd Earl of Atholl and Lady Janet Campbell.

Her three siblings were; Henry Stewart, 2nd Lord Methven (died 3 March 1572), Dorothea Stewart, Countess of Gowrie, and Joan Stewart, Countess of Argyll.

Margaret Stewart was called the "Mistress of Ochiltree" after she married Andrew Stewart, Master of Ochiltree in 1567, eldest son of Andrew Stewart, 2nd Lord Ochiltree and Agnes Cunningham. After his death in 1578 she married Uchtred Macdowall of Garthland, but was still called, and signed her name, "Margaret, Mistress of Ochiltree", or "Margaret, Lady Ochiltree". Margaret Stewart the second wife of the minister John Knox, was her sister in law.

She had a long running dispute with Lord Robert Stewart, commendator of Whithorn over Cruggleton Castle and its lands. In August 1579 she was awarded the goods of John Douglas, chamberlain of Whithorn, who refused to surrender the castle to her.

She was paid £100 Scots in September 1579 presumably for a royal pension. She was friendly with Patrick Vaus of Barnbarroch, who paid her 500 merks towards a royal pension she had from the incomes of Whithorn Priory in December 1582. She wrote to him on 20 August 1583 from Perth calling him "brother", and asking him to pay her debt to an Edinburgh tailor, Nicoll Spens. She called him "brother" as a member of the extended family of Janet Stewart, daughter of the Earl of Atholl, who had married four times, so making Margaret Stewart a relative of the Ruthvens, the Kennedys of Girvanmains, and the Gordons of Sutherland.

On 1 February 1591 she was listed as a member of the household of Anne of Denmark with her daughters Mary, Martha, and Jean. Margaret had a male and a female servant and a page. She was paid substantial sums from the royal treasury, and may have been a leading figure in the queen's household, a role known as "hofmesterinde" at the Danish court.

James VI came to Holyrood Palace on 25 July 1595 from Stirling Castle, after receiving a letter from Sir Robert Melville assuring him the queen was ill, on the testimony of the Mistress of Ochiltree and other gentlewomen. There was some doubt over the queen's illness because a plot was suspected.

On 11 October 1603 Margaret Stewart was given a royal pension of 300 and later 700 merks annually for her service to Anne of Denmark and her children from 1590 to 1603, and especially for looking after Lady Margaret, Duke Robert, and Prince Charles at Dunfermline Palace before he was put in the keeping of Alexander Seton, 1st Earl of Dunfermline.

On 4 May 1621 she wrote from Dalkeith Palace to her son and Sir Robert Kerr, a gentleman of the king's chamber, asking him to ask the King for payment of her pension by the depute treasurer Gideon Murray. She reminded him that she had served Anne of Denmark since the month of her arrival in Scotland to the day she left in June 1603.

== Family ==
Her children formed links at court, especially as ladies in waiting in the household of Anne of Denmark, where she was the senior lady in waiting. Her second son Josias Stewart sided with the rebels Francis Stewart, 5th Earl of Bothwell and Hercules Stewart, but was pardoned for his treason. Her children were;

- Andrew Stewart, who became the 3rd Lord Ochiltree, and then by an exchange of titles, Baron Castle Stuart.
- Josias Stewart of Bonington, who was a supporter of Francis Stewart, 5th Earl of Bothwell. In 1595 he revealed information to the Privy Council of Scotland about a band or league between the Earl and the Catholic rebel Northern earls. He was the executor and administrator of the estates of his sister Jean Stewart, Lady Bargany and her son Thomas Kennedy.
- Mary (or Margery) Stewart (d. 1606) was a lady in waiting in the household of Anne of Denmark, she married Sir Roger Aston an English favourite of James VI who had appointed him Gentleman of the Bedchamber in 1587, and in 1596 keeper of Linlithgow Palace, where two of her daughters were born.
- Anne Stewart, married Andrew Kerr of Ferniehirst, called Lord Jedburgh, who had been Captain of the King's Guard. At the marriage of the "young laird Farnieherst" in January 1585 the king's bed caught fire.
- Jean Stewart, also a maiden in the household of Anne of Denmark, married Gilbert Kennedy younger of Bargany. The wedding was celebrated at court with food and music and King James gave her clothes. It was said that James VI compelled the Laird of Bargany to arrange the marriage without a dowry, because he had sided with kirk ministers against him. The queen arranged a loan for the dowry.
- Margaret Stewart, also a maiden in the queen's household, who married in January 1596 Sir John Stewart younger of Traquair. Their son John Stewart of Traquair inherited, and was made Lord Stewart of Traquair, and Earl of Traquair in 1633.
- Martha Stewart, who married Nicholas Rutherford of Hundalee.
