= Janet Stewart, Lady Ruthven =

Scottish aristocrat

Janet Stewart, Lady Ruthven (c. 1500 – after 1564) was a Scottish noblewoman.

She was a daughter of John Stewart, 2nd Earl of Atholl and Lady Janet Campbell, a daughter of Archibald Campbell, 2nd Earl of Argyll and Elizabeth Stewart.

Janet Stewart married (1) Alexander Gordon, Master of Sutherland (died 1529), (2) Hugh Kennedy of Girvanmains (divorced), (3) in 1544, Henry Stewart, 1st Lord Methven (died 1552), and (4) in 1557, Patrick Ruthven, 3rd Lord Ruthven.

A Latin document drawn up at Dunrobin Castle on 4 November 1544 calls her "Dame Jean or Jonete Stewart, Mistress of the earldom of Sutherland and Lady of lordship of Methven". On that day, John Murray, the bailie of her estates, produced a royal letter ordering the tenants of Sutherland to pay rent to her for her jointure lands. The officer of the court at Dunrobin, Donald Skallag, read out the letters, and then Murquhard Murray explained in Scottish Gaelic the legal penalties if the rents were not paid.

In June 1545 Mary, Queen of Scots and Regent Arran granted Lord Methven and "Lady Jonet Stewart" some of the lands of Gorthy in Perthshire. Around the year 1550, Archibald Douglas, 6th Earl of Angus granted "Dame Jonet Stewart Lady Methven" and her son Henry Stewart, Lord Methven, rights over the marriage of a Forfarshire heiress Katherine Gorthy.

In June 1564, she gave a present of textiles to Mary, Queen of Scots including, a cloth of estate of cloth of gold which was used to make mats to lay around the queen's bed, two more cloths of estate, and a tablecloth of cloth of gold.

== Family ==
Her children included:

- John Gordon, 11th Earl of Sutherland.
- Gilbert Kennedy of Girvanmains, who married Margaret Kennedy in 1553.
- Barbara Kennedy, who married John Bellenden by contract signed by the Regent Mary of Guise herself on 30 September 1555.
- Elizabeth Kennedy, who married Patrick Vans of Barnbarroch at Perth on 17 August 1561.
- Helen Kennedy, who married Laurence Bruce of Cultmalindie, who was appointed Faud of Shetland and built Muness Castle on Unst.

Four children with Lord Methven, born before their marriage;

- Dorothea Stewart, who married William Ruthven, Master of Ruthven at Perth on 17 August 1561.
- Henry Stewart, 2nd Lord Methven (died 1572), who married Jean Ruthven, a daughter of Patrick Ruthven, 3rd Lord Ruthven and his first wife Janet Douglas, a daughter of Archibald Douglas, 6th Earl of Angus.
- Joan or Jonet Stewart, who married Colin Campbell, 6th Earl of Argyll.
- Margaret Stewart, who married (1) Andrew Stewart, Master of Ochiltree, eldest son of Andrew Stewart, 2nd Lord Ochiltree, (2) Uchtred Macdowall of Garthland

And :

- Alexander Ruthven, who was a gentleman of the king's bedchamber in 1580.
