= Hugh Kennedy of Girvanmains =

Scottish courtier, soldier, and landowner

Hugh or Huw Kennedy of Girvanmains was a Scottish courtier, soldier, and landowner.

He was the son of Alexander Kennedy of Girvanmains in Ayrshire. The family lived at Dalquharran Castle.

He was a supporter of Archibald Douglas, 6th Earl of Angus when James V of Scotland was in his minority. After James V broke free from the Douglases, Kennedy was regarded as a traitor, but was forgiven in 1530 and allowed to into exile in France.

In August 1554 Mary of Guise hired a private ship, called the Lion from George Hume to attack Borve Castle, Sutherland held by Iye Du Mackay. Hugh Kennedy embarked 50 soldiers and the royal gunner Hans Cochrane with a cannon. Provisions for Kennedy's voyage included a barrel of white wine bought from Anthony Varennes, a French soldier based at Broughty Castle under Monsieur Curtre.

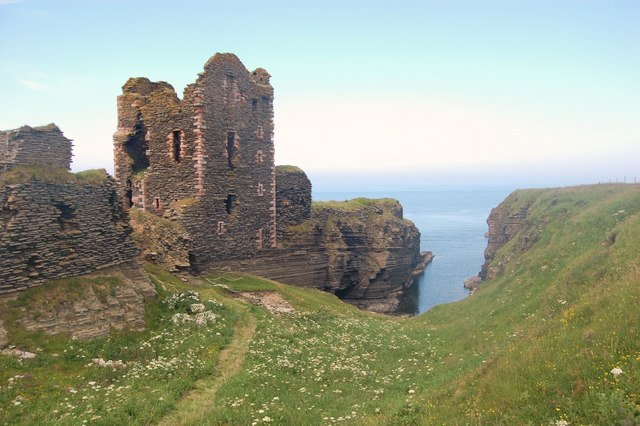
Hugh Kennedy hoped to capture the Robsons at Girnigoe Castle in 1554

Kennedy was at Dunrobin Castle in October 1554. He wrote to the Earl of Cassillis that he had met representatives of the Clan Gunn on 12 October who promised their loyalty to the queen. The Robson Gunn family, however, were prominent supporters of Iye Du Mackay. John Robson's sons and his nephews were at Girnigoe Castle. Hugh Kennedy asked Cassillis to persuade Mary of Guise to order the Earl of Caithness to surrender Girnigoe. William Robson could be charged with treason for fire-raising, murder, slaughter, and concurring with and fortifying rebels. Hugh Kennedy wrote that he planned to meet Iye Du Mackay on 18 October, and he hoped he would accept the queen regent's terms. The late Donald Mackay's wife Helen Sinclair was in possession of some of Mary of Guise's dower lands near Inverness. Hugh Kennedy thought that Mary of Guise could take these lands, because Helen Sinclair had hosted the household servants of the rebel Iye Du Mackay. He thought the matter would not even go to trial. He sent his greetings to Henri Cleutin.

In October 1555, Hugh Kennedy was paid for the voyage in the Lion, and for keeping Iye Du Mackay and two gentlemen, and buying Mackay clothes before 11 November 1554, with two years arrears of his salary.

Rob John Robson was subsequently a pledge for the Clan Gunn and was held at Edinburgh Castle from February 1558.

The date of Hugh Kennedy's death is unknown.

== Marriage and family ==
He married Lady Janet Stewart, a daughter of John Stewart, 2nd Earl of Atholl and Janet Campbell. She was first married to Alexander Gordon, Master of Sutherland, and known as the "Mistress of Sutherland". After her marriage to Hugh Kennedy was dissolved, she married Henry Stewart, 1st Lord Methven in 1544, and she subsequently married Patrick Ruthven, 3rd Lord Ruthven.

Their children included:

- Gilbert Kennedy of Girvanmains, who married Margaret Kennedy in 1553
- Elizabeth or Elspeth Kennedy (died 1572), who married Patrick Vans of Barnbarroch at Perth on 17 August 1561.
- Barbara Kennedy, who married John Bellenden of Auchnoul, Lord Justice Clerk. The marriage contract was signed by Mary of Guise on 30 September 1555. Barbara was her lady-in-waiting. Guise contributed £266-13s-4d to her dowry in October 1555. At this time, her father was employed by Guise on a military mission against the Clan Mackay, and John Bellenden was working with the Queen Regent at her justice ayres in Dumfries and Jedburgh.
- Margaret Kennedy, who married Ughtred McDowall of Garthland. His second wife was Margaret Stewart, Mistress of Ochiltree, a daughter of Henry Stewart, 1st Lord Methven.
- Helen Kennedy, who married in 1559 Laurence Bruce (died 1617), son of John Bruce of Cultmalindie and Euphame Elphinstone, a daughter of Alexander Elphinstone, 1st Lord Elphinstone. In 1566 Laurence Bruce he stood surety for Hugh Kennedy in his feud with Lord Oliphant. Laurence Bruce became Sheriff or "Faud" of Shetland from 1571 and built Muness Castle on Unst. Their children included Alexander Bruce of Cultmalindie, Andrew Bruce of Muness, and Helen Bruce who married Adam Sinclair of Brow.
