= Cousland Castle =

Ruined Scottish castle

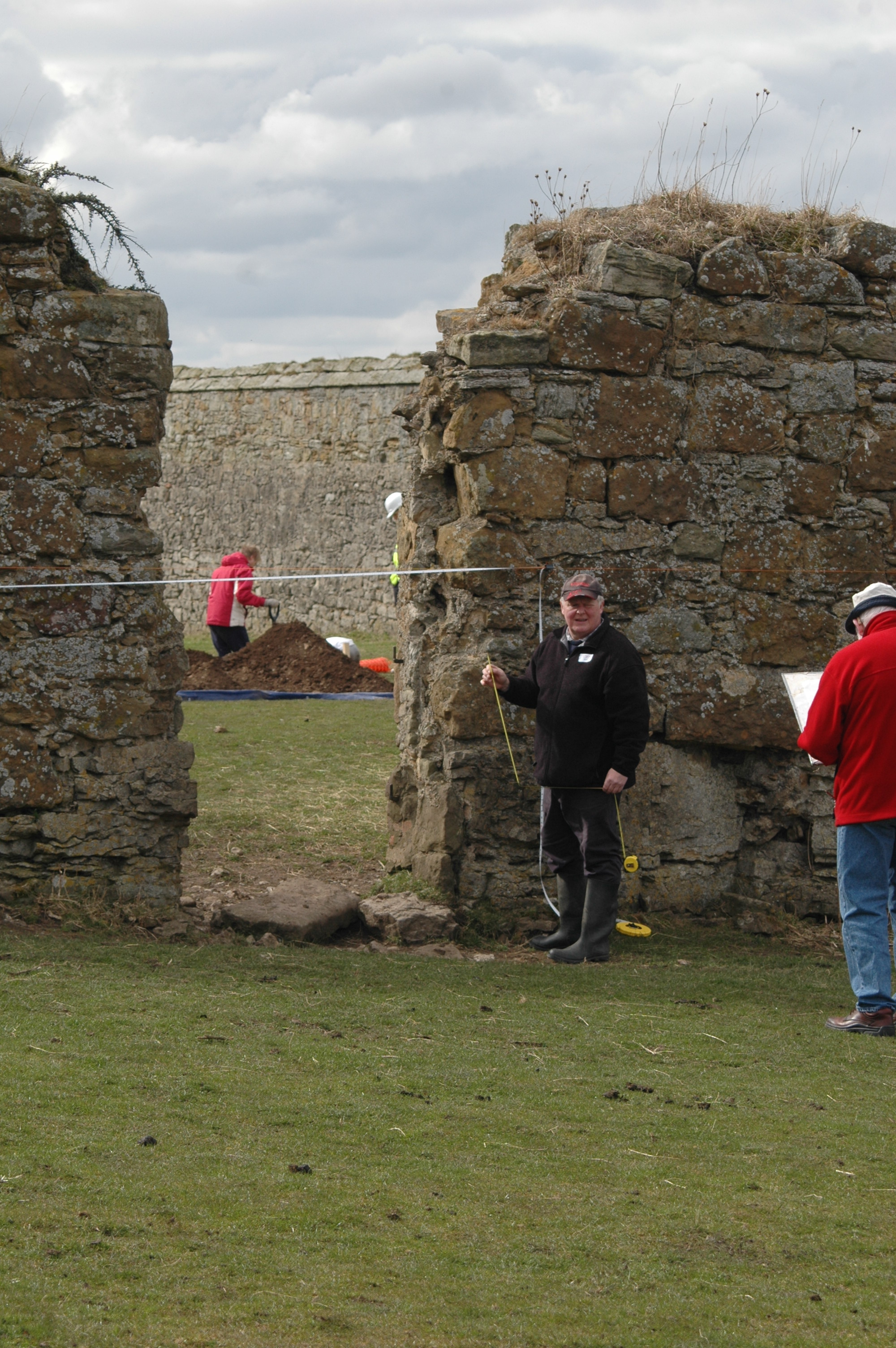
- Interactive map of the Cousland Castle area

General information
- Type: ruined castle
- Location: Cousland, Midlothian, Scotland
- Coordinates: 55°54′15″N 2°59′52″W

Design and construction
- Designations: scheduled monument

Cousland Castle is a ruined castle near the town of Cousland, Midlothian, Scotland.

== Structure ==
The 16th-century ruins of the tower house and enclosure walls are all that remains. The original 15th-century tower house was extended in the 16th century to form a larger residence. The basement of the tower is vaulted. The tower stands at the north-east corner of the square walled garden area, 68 metres (223 ft), enclosed by walls 85 centimetres (33 in) thick, probably constructed after 1690. The house was demolished after 1760, and the walls survive intact on the northern sides. The tower, house and walls are protected as a scheduled monument.

== History ==
Cousland was a hunting lodge of the St Clair of Roslin family. Henry Sinclair, Lord Sinclair sold Cousland to William Ruthven, Lord Ruthven in 1493. Cousland was also associated with Robert or Thomas Cochrane, a courtier and favourite of James III of Scotland. He was said to have been a stone mason who rose to prominence until he was assassinated at Lauder Bridge in 1482. Thomas Cochrane held some lands of Cousland as a gift from the King.

The castle was burned by Patrick Charteris as a result of a feud with William Ruthven, 2nd Lord Ruthven in 1529. Following the Battle of Pinkie in 1547, the castle was slighted by Edward Seymour, Duke of Somerset. The castle is indicated as "Cowsland" with a sketch in the maps of the battle published by William Patten in 1548.

It is said that in 1567 Mary, Queen of Scots, made her formal surrender to the Confederate Lords after the battle of Carberry Hill at Cousland Castle. David Calderwood's account of the battle places the Lords at the "north side of Cowsland" rather than at the castle.

Cousland was forfeited by John Ruthven, 3rd Earl of Gowrie and his mother Dorothea Stewart, and was subsequently granted to Hugh Herries, a physician to James VI and I who had helped to rescue the King from the Ruthvens at Gowrie House in Perth on August 1605. The castle passed from the Herries family, to the Hays of Kinnoull, before passing to the Makgill family in the 17th century.

In the late 17th century, Cousland was known to be in the ownership of John Dalrymple, 1st Earl of Stair.
