= Barbara Ruthven =

Scottish maid of honour to Anne of Denmark

Barbara Ruthven (died 1625) was a Scottish courtier, favourite of Anne of Denmark, and expelled from court after the death of her brother.

Barbara Ruthven was a daughter of Dorothea Stewart, Countess of Gowrie and the oldest daughter of Janet Stewart, daughter of John Stewart, 2nd Earl of Atholl, and William Ruthven, 1st Earl of Gowrie and Henry Stewart, 1st Lord Methven.

== Career ==
She was a maid of honour to Anne of Denmark with her sister Beatrix. Francis Mowbray called Barbara a "dame of honour" to the queen in a letter of 1602.

Beatrix Ruthven had a prominent role at the christening of Princess Elizabeth in November 1596, for which the queen bought her a gown of figured black velvet with white sleeves and a yellow damask skirt. Christene Ruthven, another gentlewoman listed in the queen's household may have been another sister. Their sister Elizabeth was married to Robert Gordon of Lochinvar.

James Hudson noted Barbara having a secret conversation with the Scottish ambassador Robert Crichton, 8th Lord Crichton of Sanquhar in May 1597. Beatrix Ruthven was also a significant political figure at court, and was given a present by "McSorley", Sir James MacDonell of Dunluce, in October 1598.

The Earl of Gowrie and one of his brothers were killed in a struggle with James VI of Scotland on 5 August 1600 at Gowrie House in Perth. David Calderwood recorded anecdotes presaging the event. Days before, Beatrix Ruthven had laughed at the crooked feet of a Doctor Hereis, and he solemnly took her hand and said that a great disaster was coming her way. Two younger Ruthven brothers managed to find safety with their tutor at Berwick-upon-Tweed, where John Carey noted that their two sisters who waited on the queen were sent from court. Carey sent the brothers to Durham, and hoped their tutor would take them to Cambridge University.

The Gowrie sisters were protected by Anne of Denmark even though James wished them to be excluded from his presence, and had ordered them to be 'thrust out' of Falkland Palace. On 1 November 1600 their mother, Dorothea Stewart, who was staying at Dirleton Castle, hoped that the king could be persuaded to support her daughters, "quhais estait is verie desolait" and she could not help them herself. The French ambassador in London heard that Anne of Denmark kept to her chamber, in a state of undress, and complained of the absence of her servants, the Gowrie sisters.

Sir Robert Cecil, who was in the confidence of Anne of Denmark, helped Barbara travel to London. Cecil wrote to the Master of Gray about the reception of Barbara Ruthven in England, saying that some of Elizabeth's ladies had taken pity on her, but the queen had not received her in court. He mentioned an intercession by "the Queen that is there", meaning Anne of Denmark. Cecil wrote another letter on 3 January 1602, probably to the Master of Gray, explaining the delicate and flammable situation of Elizabeth receiving letters asking for the relief of 'that house which is touched with the infamy of attempting the king's blood'. In August 1602 Cecil understood that Anne of Denmark and Queen Elizabeth were agreed that Barbara should come to London. In September Roger Aston told James VI that Beatrix Ruthven was in England. Cecil wrote to the diplomat in Scotland George Nicholson saying she had no access to the queen or her ministers. Lord Sanquhar had asked Cecil if he would talk to her, and he said would prefer to hear from her via James's diplomat and agent in London. King James heard rumours she was "trafficking busily and to his prejudice" in London. An agent of Elizabeth told James that she would not have any dealings with the Gowrie sisters.

A Scottish diplomat in London, James Hudson, wrote to Cecil that it was best "Mrs Barbara were away", and given something. Barbara was in London when on 25 December 1602 her sister Beatrix Ruthven was smuggled into the apartments of Anne of Denmark posing as a gentlewoman servant to Lady Paisley or Lady Angus, at the queen's request. There was a rumour in February 1603 that Barbara Ruthven had returned to Scotland by boat.

Roger Aston discussed with Anne of Denmark how her support for the Gowrie brothers and sisters and a suspected plot against King James may have dented her reputation in England. Early in 1603 Barbara came to London again from Cambridge (where her brothers were) and had new clothes made for her. James Hudson wrote to Sir Robert Cecil saying there were rumours she came to join Elizabeth's household or seek favours for her brothers.

Ruthven's appearance seemed striking and her speech foreign to the lawyer John Manningham who wrote, 'I sawe this afternoone a Scottishe Lady at Mr. Fleetes in Loathebury; shee was sister to Earl Gowre, a gallant tall gentlewoman, somewhat long visage, a lisping fumbling language. Peter Saltingstone came to visit hir' and 'was with the Lady Barbara, Shee saith the King will not swear, but he will curse and ban at hunting, and wish the divel goe with them all'.

== Union of the Crowns ==
In January 1603, the Privy Council of England wrote to Sir John Carey at Berwick, asking that none should assist the Ruthven brothers. He did not think they were still in the locality. Elizabeth I died, and James became King of England at the Union of the Crowns. In May 1603 Cecil organised an exchequer payment to his steward Roger Houghton for £300 spent on Barbara Ruthven's relief, and she was later given a yearly pension of £200. She wrote to the Privy Council on 19 June accepting the king's wish that she should leave London, and that she would live at Mr Scott's house in the country, where she had previously lodged. She was paid £100 on 3 September.

In Scotland early in 1604, the Earl of Mar heard an unlikely rumour that Cecil would marry Barbara Ruthven. She was granted a royal pension of £200 yearly. William Wade, newly made keeper of the Tower of London in August 1605, heard that she sometimes visited her brother Patrick Ruthven, "the young gentleman Gowrie" but there was no warrant permitting this.

In 1622 Barbara Ruthven was the administrator of the will of the Scottish bigamist Sir John Kennedy, appointed because his daughter Dorothy was too young to be executrix.

Barbara Ruthven was buried at Greenwich on 29 December 1625.

There has been some confusion with "Lady Ruthin", Elizabeth Talbot Grey, Countess of Kent, who became first lady of the bedchamber to Anne of Denmark in 1617.

== Beatrix Ruthven, Lady Coldenknowes ==
In May 1606 King James wrote to his advocate Thomas Hamilton to draw up an act to rehabilitate Mistress Beatrix, excepting any family inheritance.

Beatrix married Sir James Home of Coldenknowes and died in Scotland. Their son was Sir James Home of Whitriggs, who married Anne Home, daughter of George Home, 1st Earl of Dunbar and Elizabeth Gordon, daughter of Alexander Gordon of Gight and Agnes Beaton, daughter of Cardinal David Beaton, Archbishop of St. Andrews, and Marion Ogilvy. James and Anne Home's son was James Home, 3rd Earl of Home.

== Patrick Ruthven, Marie Ruthven, and Anthony van Dyck ==
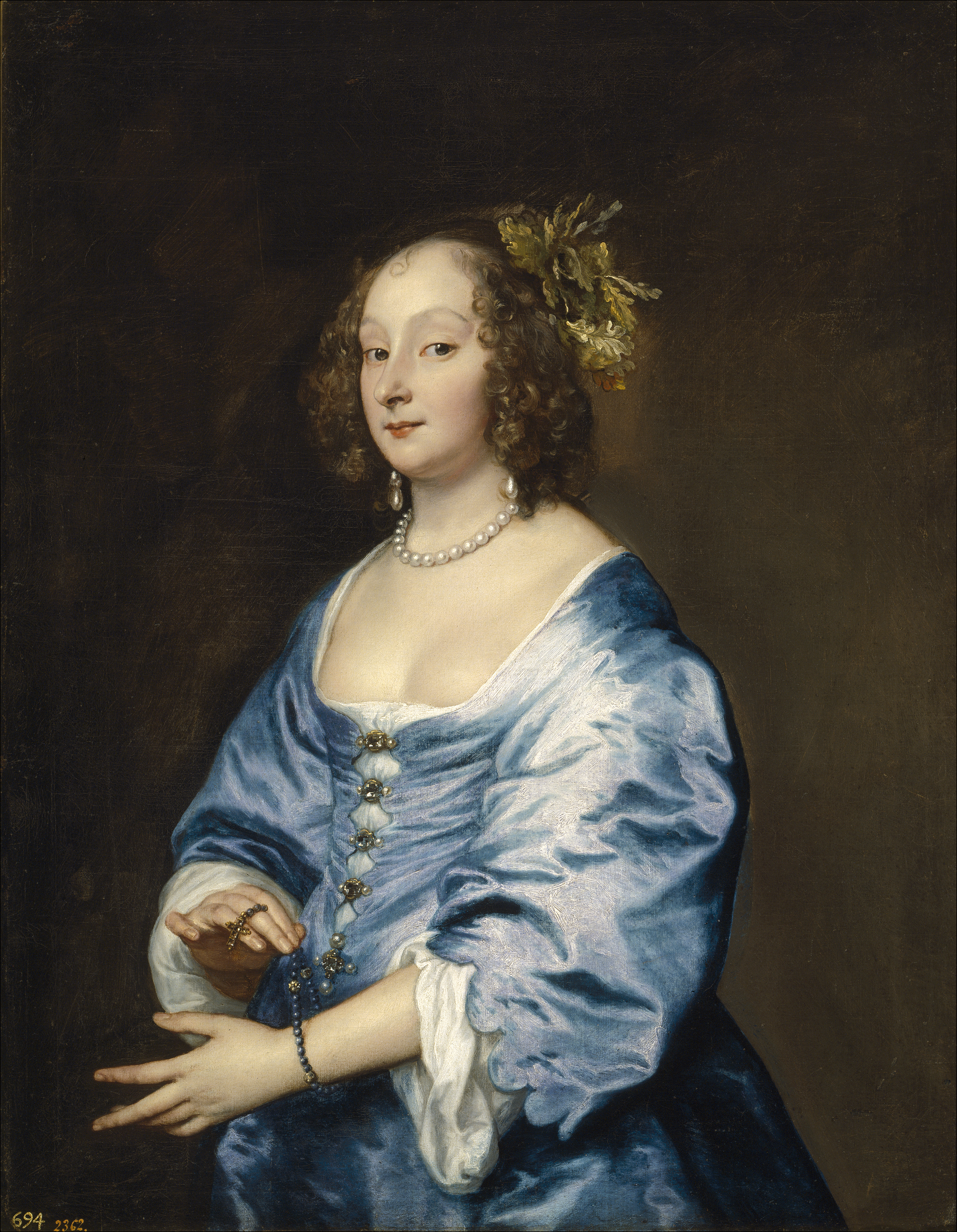
Mary Ruthven, Anthony van Dyck, Museo del Prado

King James made proclamations in April 1603 for the capture of Patrick and William Ruthven. The Venetian ambassador heard that they had planned to assassinate King James because of the death of their brother, the Earl of Gowrie, and that Gowrie had been killed because he was in love with Anne of Denmark.

Barbara's younger brothers went to Berwick-upon-Tweed and lived in hiding for a month, until the Marshall of the town Sir John Carey helped them travel to Durham and Cambridge. Later in 1603, Sir William Ingleby (1546–1618) of Ripley Castle captured one of the fugitive brothers of the Earl of Gowrie at Kirkby Malzeard. He was recognised at an inn kept by Christopher Mawlam, by Francis Wandesford, who had seen him before at Durham. At first he pretended to be from "Wutton" in County Durham, but his lack of local knowledge revealed him. Next day Ingleby received him as a prisoner. He had with him a satchel stuffed with books and some apothecary confections, according to Wandesford's letter to Robert Cecil.

Patrick Ruthven was a prisoner in the Tower of London in 1613. According to the letter writer John Chamberlain, he was assaulted by another prisoner, the Earl of Northumberland for crossing his path while they were walking in the garden. Around this time, in February 1613, Arbella Stuart seems to have expected to be released from the Tower to attend the marriage of Princess Elizabeth. She bought pearls to wear from the jeweller Abraham der Kinderen. Arbella was not invited and pawned and sold most of the pearls for funds a few months later. Ruthven made these transactions for her. Patrick Ruthven was visited in the Tower by an astrologer and an alchemist, and seems to be the man captured by Sir William Ingleby in 1603. His brother William Ruthven was also interested in alchemy.

Patrick Ruthven was given an allowance with money for clothing and books. He was released in August 1622, and according to John Chamberlain, given a pension of £500 a year and confined to live in Oxford or Cambridge. The Earl of Kellie heard that his niece Elizabeth Gerard nee Woodford had organised his release using the influence of the Duke of Buckingham. She was the widow of Thomas Gerard (died 1618), and she married Patrick Ruthven after he was freed.

Ruthven was restored by the Parliament of Scotland in 1641. He and Elizabeth had three sons, including Patrick Ruthven (died 1667) who was a soldier in Swedish service. Their daughter Marie or Mary Ruthven (d. 1645) was a maid of honour to Henrietta Maria. She married the painter Anthony van Dyck. He painted her portrait several times. Their daughter Justiniana van Dyck was baptised on the day the painter died, 9 December 1641. Mary married secondly Sir Richard Pryse.
