= Patrick Ruthven, 3rd Lord Ruthven =

Scottish nobleman and politician

Patrick Ruthven, 3rd Lord Ruthven (c. 1520 – 13 June 1566) played an important part in the political intrigues of 16th century Scotland. He succeeded to the lordship in December 1552. The Ruthven lordship encompassed the offices of Provost and Constable of Perth, and Sheriff of Strathearn.

== Life ==
Patrick was the son of William Ruthven, 2nd Lord Ruthven and Janet Haliburton, heiress of the Haliburtons of Dirleton Castle.

=== Quest for wealth and advancement ===
During the war of the Rough Wooing, Patrick, Master of Ruthven, aided the English cause. In 1548 the English commander Grey of Wilton noted that he had been at the English-held Yester Castle with his servants in their "jacks" wearing red scarves. He wanted to profit by delivering Perth to the English. His father was provost of the town, and Patrick offered it to Sir Andrew Dudley, a brother of the Duke of Northumberland, who occupied Broughty Castle.

After the war with England was concluded, in March 1551 he was in Paris and wrote to Mary of Guise asking for money she had promised him. Her financial officer Bartholomew de Villemore had tried to pay him with deprecated coinage. Patrick also asked for political preferment:

I haif evir bene and salbe at your grace commandment. Fordir, pleis your grace, I think I have bene ane futtman lang aneuch, bot quhene it pless your grace ye will mak me ane hors man amangis utheris, ... I shall jeopard my lyfe in your service farder nor thame that giffis yow fairer wordis and gettis mair of your geir.

I have ever been and shall be at your grace's commandment. Further, please your grace, I think I have been a footman long enough; but when it please you grace, you will make me a horseman, among others,... I shall jeopardize my life in your service farther than any who gives you fairer words and gets more of your gear.

=== Religious and political stance ===
However, as a strong Protestant and a supporter of the Lords of the Congregation, Patrick signed the Treaty of Berwick in 1560, and sent his son Archibald as a hostage to England and Westminster School. Ruthven wrote to William Cecil from Huntingtower Castle reminding him of their previous meetings in England during the time of Edward VI, and approving of Cecil's, "forth-setting of the union of these realms in greater amity than in times bypast has been." In conference with Mary of Guise on 12 May 1560, at Edinburgh Castle, Ruthven was more unyielding on all points than any of the other representatives of the Congregation.

== Political office and other involvements ==
Thomas Randolph, was the English ambassador present in Scotland for the short years that Mary, Queen of Scots spent actively ruling there. In June 1563, Randolph reported that Patrick had joined Mary's privy council at the instance of William Maitland of Lethington, in spite of the fact that the queen personally could not abide him. In 1565, he was one of the few nobles who supported Mary's marriage with Henry Stuart, Lord Darnley.

Patrick was the leader of the band (which also included Darnley) that murdered David Rizzio, Mary's personal secretary and favorite. This event was followed by his flight into England.

In Edinburgh Lord Ruthven lived at "Lord Ruthven's Land" at the foot of the West Bow at the east end of the Grassmarket.

On 2 April 1566, Ruthven and Morton sent their testimony on David Rizzio's murder to Queen Elizabeth I of England, declaring they had acted the best for Darnley, Mary, state and religion. Ruthven died in England.

Mary's secretary Claude Nau wrote that he died deceived by evil spirits who made him rave of a false vision of heaven.

== Family ==
Patrick married first Janet Douglas (d. around 1552), illegitimate daughter of Archibald Douglas, 6th Earl of Angus, and had several children. Secondly, he married Janet Stewart, daughter of John Stewart, 2nd Earl of Atholl, and widow of Henry Stewart, 1st Lord Methven. Patrick's two eldest children married their stepmother Janet Stewart's children; daughter Jean Ruthven married Henry Stewart, 2nd Lord Methven, and the heir, William Ruthven, 1st Earl of Gowrie, married Dorothea Stewart.

A younger son Alexander Ruthven was a gentleman of the king's bedchamber in 1580.

Peerage of the United Kingdom
Preceded by William Ruthven	Lord Ruthven; 1552–1566	Succeeded by William Ruthven
