= Roger Aston =

English courtier

Sir Roger Aston (died 23 May 1612) of Cranford, Middlesex, was an English courtier and favourite of James VI of Scotland.

== Biography ==
Aston was the illegitimate son of Thomas Aston (died 1553). Scottish sources spell his name variously as "Aschetone", "Aschetoun", or "Aschingtoun".

After serving the Earl of Lennox, Lord Darnley, and Mary, Queen of Scots, Aston was made a Gentleman of the Bedchamber to James VI of Scotland in 1578.

In England, he was Master of the Great Wardrobe to King James I in England. He held both positions until his death. From 1595 he was keeper of Linlithgow Palace, and one of his daughters was born at the palace in October 1595.

== At the Scottish court ==
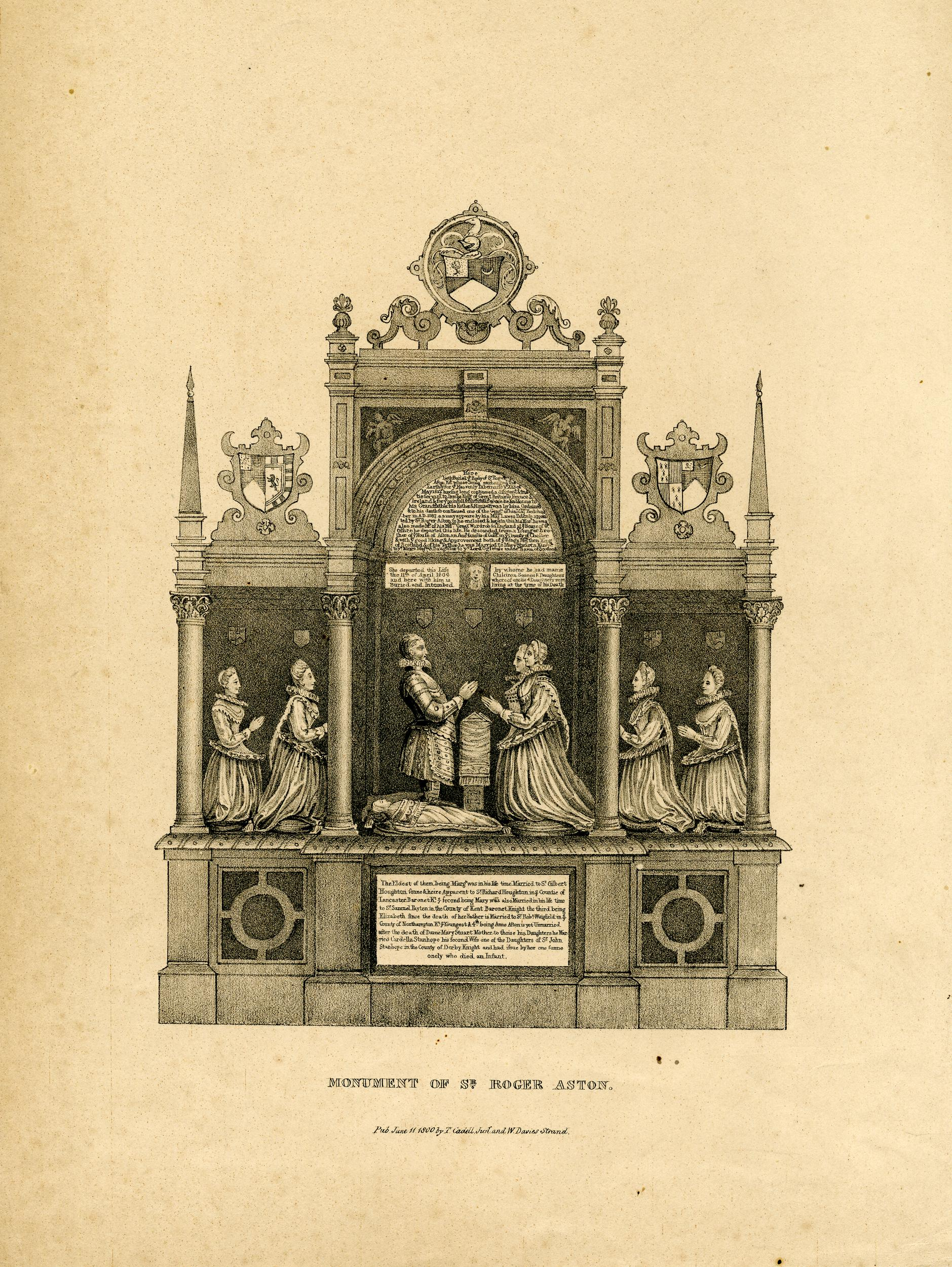
Engraving of Aston's monument at Cranford

In May 1580 twenty five gentlemen were appointed as "pensioners to attend the King's Majesty at all times on his riding and passing to the fields". The riding entourage included Aston with, Captain James Stewart, Captain Crawford, Walter Stewart of Blantyre, the Master of Cathcart, John Carmichael, James Anstruther, Patrick Hume of Polwarth, and John Stewart of Baldynneis.

In July 1582 Aston was sent to Antwerp with a Scottish diplomat. They were to bring back Colonel William Stewart of Houston. Aston wrote to the Earl of Leicester describing his mission, the state of Scotland, and reporting the surrender of the town of "Houdencke", meaning Oudenaarde, whose garrison was allowed to retire with ensigns displayed.

The diplomat and intriguer Archibald Douglas held a longstanding grudge against Aston based on an incident in 1583. James VI had given Francis Walsingham a ring but Walsingham discovered the stone was worthless. He gave the ring to Aston to return it to Scotland but Aston later claimed it was stolen from him.

=== Babington Plot ===
In September 1586 Aston carried King James's congratulations to Elizabeth on the discovery of the Babington Plot. In December 1586 he rode again to London with Robert Melville and the Master of Gray who were sent as ambassadors to plead for the life of Mary, Queen of Scots. He received £4,000 from Queen Elizabeth I for James VI, the payment of an annuity or subsidy.

Aston brought the news of Mary's death to James VI in February 1587. Archibald Douglas had advised William Davison to delay sending Aston to Edinburgh with the bad news, which could affect and diminish Aston's standing with the king, and so his utility to English service. However, Aston's reputation did not suffer.

=== Factional politics ===
In July 1587 Aston wrote to Francis Walsingham and Archibald Douglas from Falkland Palace. He told Walsingham he felt abandoned and wished to seek his fortune elsewhere. To Douglas he wrote of his hopes that Elizabeth would work for James, and of his efforts for Douglas personally in the "part of a true friend". He felt unable to write to their friend Thomas Fowler because of his evil fortune. Douglas sent Aston's letters to Walsingham. It was expected that Aston and Sir William Keith of Delny would lose their places at court because they had been supporters of the Master of Gray, who was out of favour. The Earl of Huntly's followers called Aston, Keith, and the Lord Privy Seal "Queen Elizabeth's pensioners". Aston felt he was watched as an Englishman and could not write as often as he wished.

Aston travelled from the court at Falkland to Edinburgh in 1588. While he was asleep he was robbed of £70 in gold and some jewels including a ring.

Aston remained in the king's service, and in December 1588 stayed at Kinneil House and played a card game called "maye" with the king. Aston wrote to James Hudson that James was pleased by the news of the deaths of Catherine de' Medici and the Duke of Guise. He mentioned the worth of Fulke Greville's opinions. He was himself growing weary of the "little certainty in this state as I know not what to say to it". James Hudson sent Aston's letters to Walsingham.

In March 1589 Aston (and Thomas Fowler) wrote of his support for the Chancellor of Scotland, John Maitland, 1st Lord Maitland of Thirlestane. Aston went to London and met with Walsingham on 12 April. Fowler wanted his correspondence kept secret from the Scottish ambassador and Aston. Aston returned to Edinburgh on 28 May 1589.

In August 1589 Aston travelled to London to buy items for the arrival in Scotland, the wedding, and the coronation of Anne of Denmark. He visited or wrote to Lord Scrope at Carlisle for actors from the Queen's Players to perform in Edinburgh. However, bad weather prevented Anne of Denmark from sailing. Aston travelled to Norway and Denmark with the king in 1589 and 1590.

The English ambassador Robert Bowes was asked to tell James VI about the execution in London of the Irishman Brian O'Rourke, who had been captured in Glasgow. Bowes decided to give a list of alleged treasons to Aston so that he could approach the king in the "best season" to break the news. Aston socialised with Bowes, and would travel to the horse races at Gatherley near Richmond, which Bowes also attended.

On 3 January 1592 James VI sent Aston to Elizabeth to describe the events of 27 December, when the rebel Francis Stewart, 5th Earl of Bothwell broke into Holyrood Palace and to ask that the annuity or subsidy be advanced to pay for a royal guard. On his return to court, he attempted to persuade Anne of Denmark not to intercede with James VI for Bothwell's supporters, including the physician John Naysmyth.

=== The good captain of Linlithgow ===
Aston was made keeper of Linlithgow Palace and once for a practical joke hung a copy of his family tree in the gallery next to that of the king of France, which James VI found very amusing. In 1594 he repaired the roof of Linlithgow Palace using lead shipped from England. While he was at Stirling Castle in September 1595 he sold a hackney horse to James VI for him to ride, costing £200 Scots. He asked the English ambassador Robert Bowes for a fair and large portrait of Queen Elizabeth. Bowes referred to him as the "good captain of Lithgow". Roger Aston was of doubtful parentage and as a joke hung a copy of his family tree next to that of the king of France in the long gallery at Linlithgow, which James VI found very amusing.

Aston kept up a correspondence with Sir Robert Cecil. His letters were sensitive, and once when they were intercepted in England and returned to Scotland he risked disgrace. Cecil kept a catalogue of his sources and "intelligencers", a list of its contents show that details on Aston appeared on folio number 21. Probably, James VI knew what Aston shared with his English correspondents, and found this a useful source of information.

=== Aston and Anne of Denmark ===
Aston's wife was Mary Stewart, a well-connected gentlewoman in the household of Anne of Denmark. In May 1595, Anne of Denmark asked Roger Aston to obtain a portrait of Elizabeth I for her. Aston asked the English diplomat Robert Bowes to help.

In 1598, Aston had hoped to buy land for his wife and children's future in Scotland, but was caught up in the financial crisis caused by the bankruptcy of Robert Jousie and Thomas Foulis. They owed him £4,066 Scots.

He informed Sir Robert Cecil of the queen's factional struggles, which seem to have been mostly concerned with the custody of her son Henry Frederick, Prince of Wales.

Aston felt that Anne of Denmark had been involved with the Ruthven brothers and the mysterious events culminating in their deaths at Gowrie House in Perth. He wrote of these suspicions to Cecil, and that incriminating "presumptions were great by both by letters and tokens".

Aston went to London to collect the subsidy money in January 1601/2. Isobella Bowes, the wife of the diplomat Robert Bowes, sent gifts to Anne of Denmark with Aston. Bowes asked Robert Bruce of Kinnaird in June if his wife, Martha Douglas, could find out if the queen had received them.

Aston was injured in a fall on the steps outside Anne of Denmark's bedchamber at Dunfermline Palace in March 1602 and was unconscious for three hours. He recovered, and subsequently discussed with Anne of Denmark how her support for the exiled Gowrie brothers and sisters and a suspected plot against King James may have dented her reputation in England.

== England ==
At the Union of the Crowns following the death of Queen Elizabeth, Roger Aston brought money from London to King James at Berwick-upon-Tweed. Aston then went to York to Thomas Cecil, Lord Burghley on 4 April 1603 and told him that King James would stay at the King's Manor for Easter on his journey to London. Aston was knighted on the way south at Grimston Park.

In October 1603 the king transferred Aston's Scottish pension of 500 merks to Archibald Douglas of Whittingehame. In November 1603, Aston and a Scottish courtier brought the new of the trial of the Earl of Cobham to the king.

King James made fun of Aston as a man from Cheshire. In July 1605 James sent his unpublished manuscript Historie of the Churche to the Earl of Salisbury. James had composed the work at Dalkeith Palace in the 1580s. This manuscript however had been written by Patrick Young following a copy made by John Geddie. James apologised that the language had been corrupted first by the version of Scots used by Geddie, and then by Young's attempts to convert the text into English spelling. He joked that the result was like the Welsh spoken by Aston, who was from Cheshire.

As Master of the Wardrobe, in 1608 Aston was involved in upholstering the seating and the Lord Chancellor's woolsack in the Houses of Parliament. Aston was keeper of the little park at Eltham Palace in 1610 and built four bridges for the convenience of King James.

He was a Member of Parliament for Cheshire in the Blessed Parliament from 1604 to 1611.

King James, by writ under the privy seal, in the 9th year of his reign (1611 or 1612), granted to Sir Roger's coat-armour, an augmentation out of the two national badges of England and Scotland: the rose of England, and the thistle of Scotland impaled, in a canton or, in regard of the marriage of Sir Roger with Mary Stewart, a lady in waiting to Anne of Denmark, and daughter of Andrew Stewart, Master of Ochiltree, (who died during the life of his father Andrew Stewart, 2nd Lord Ochiltree).

Godfrey Goodman wrote that he knew Aston and found him "a very honest, plain-dealing man, no dissembler, neither did he any ill office to any man".

Aston lies buried in St Dunstan's Church, Cranford, London in an ornate church monument. (Note: Written on the monument is the following inscription: Here lyeth buried the Body of S^{r} Roger Aston K^{t}. whose Soule exchanged the Earthly for the Heavenly Tabernacle the 23^{d} of May 1612. haveing long continued a diligent & trusty Servant to James King of Great Britain France & Ireland and for the painfull & faithfull Service he had done to his Grandfather his Father & Himselfe was by him ordained (and to his death so continued) one of the Gentlemen of his Majesties Bedchamber in Anno 1587. as may appear by his Majesties Letters Patents, appointed by S^{r} Roger Aston to be inclosed and kept in this his Monument; He was alsoe made Master of his Majesties Great Wardrobe in England at the house of which office he departed this Life. He descended from a younger Branch of the House of Aston an ancient Familey of Gentry in the County of Chester: And with the good likeing and Aprovement of the Kings Majesty (then King of Scotland) and of her Father he was married to Mary Stuart a Kinswoman to the Kings Majesty and Daughter to the Lord Ogletry an antient Baron of Scotland. She departed this Life the 11th. of April 1606. and here with him is buried & intombed by whom he had many Children Sons and Daughters whereof only four daughters were living at the time of his Decease. The eldest of them being Margret was in his Life time married to Sir Gilbert Houghton in the County of Lancaster Ban^{tt}. K^{t}. The second being Mary was also married in his Life time to Sir Samuel Peyton in the County of Kent Barr^{tt}. K^{t}. The third being Elizabeth since the death of her Father is married to Sir Robert Wingfield in the County of Northampton K^{t}. The youngest & fourth being Ann Aston is yet unmarried. After the death of Dame Mary Stuart Mother to these his Daughters He married Cordelia Stanhope his 2d Wife one of the Daughters of Sir John Stanhope in the County of Derby K^{t}. & had issue by her one Son only who died an Infant.)

== Family ==
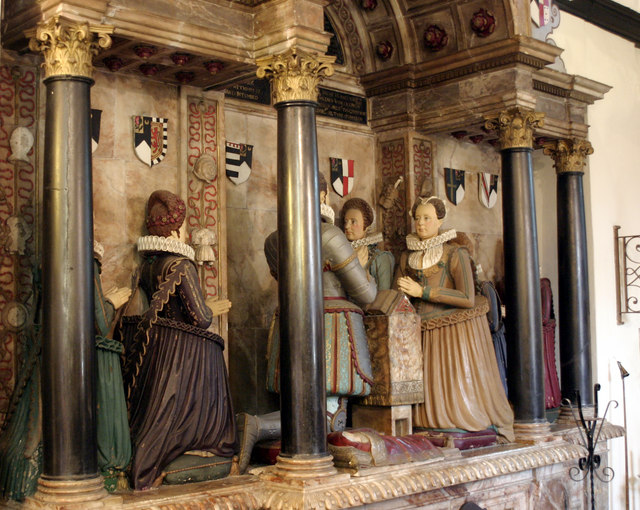
Aston Monument, St Dunstan, Cranford Park - geograph.org.uk - 1215812

Aston married firstly Mary Stewart (died 11 April 1606), gentlewoman in the household of Anne of Denmark, daughter of Margaret Stewart, Mistress of Ochiltree and Andrew Stewart, Master of Ochiltree (see above), with whom he had four daughters:Wotton 1741, p. 108

- Margaret (23 December 1657), married Sir Gilbert Houghton, 2nd Baronet, of Houghton-Tower, in Lancashire.
- Mary, married Sir Samuel Peyton, of Knowlton, in Kent.
- Elizabeth, married Sir Robert Wingfield, of Upton, in Northamptonshire,
- Anne, married Sir Thomas Perient, of Colchester, in Essex.

Anne Aston was almost married to George Villiers, but a Scottish gentleman of the privy chamber advised him against it.

Roger Aston married secondly Cordelia, daughter of Sir John Stanhope and sister to the Earl of Chesterfield. They had one son who died in infancy.Wotton 1741, p. 108
