= William Wallace of Failford =

Scottish courtier and landowner

William Wallace of Failford, (fl. 1580 – d. 1616), was a Scottish courtier and landowner.

William Wallace was a younger son of the Wallace of Craigie family, owners of Craigie Castle in South Ayrshire. He had the title of minister and proprietor of Failford or Fail Monastery.

His father was Hugh or William Wallace and his mother was Margaret Kennedy, daughter of the Laird of Bargany. Margaret Kennedy subsequently married Gilbert Kennedy, 3rd Earl of Cassilis and her daughter Katherine Kennedy was the wife of Sir Patrick Vans of Barnbarroch.

Wallace went with James VI of Scotland to Norway and Denmark to meet the king's bride Anne of Denmark. He wrote a newsletter to Sir Patrick Waus of Barnbarroch from Helsingør on 12 February 1590. Barnbarroch had left the royal party and returned to Scotland from Oslo. Wallace described the journey to Denmark, honourably conveyed to Bohus, "Ba Hous", and Varberg, "Waidberrie" in Sweden. There had been some contention amongst the Scottish lords. The Justice Clerk Lewis Bellenden was to be sent to England. The Lord Chancellor John Maitland of Thirlstane was going to Lübeck and Wallace hoped to travel with him. He was made a carver or cup-bearer to the king, a household appointment. The time in Denmark was spent hunting, but Wallace says they were dying of thirst and cob webs "worme wobbis" grew their throats.

Wallace wrote that King James had told Sophie of Mecklenburg-Güstrow, Anne's mother, of Barnbarroch's good service and the voyage in his little ship. He had heard that the dowry money would not be spent, "broikin", which displeased many, this was a reference to controversy between Chancellor Maitland and the Earl Marischal and his kinsman William Keith of Delny.

Wallace also wrote that he had given Barnbarroch's good wishes to Gert or Gerhard Rantzau (d. 1627), Captain of Kronborg, Henrik Ramel or Ramelius, and Richard Wedderburn who had a house at Helsingør. He sent a note of the Danish royal family, the Regents, and the council. Rantzau had written to Barnbarroch in August 1588 mentioning Andrew Keith, Lord Dingwall and Failford's brother John Wallace as his kinsman.

Wallace married Jonet Cathcart (d. 1630), who became known as "Lady Faill". His children included William, Nathan, Robert, Elizabeth, Helen and Margaret, and Jean and Annabel and Marie.

William Wallace died in 1616. Although a part of the property at Fail or Failford did not pass to his son William, but went instead to Walter Whyteford, William junior became William Wallace of Failford.
