= Cousland =

Village in Midlothian, Scotland

Coordinates: 55°54′15″N 2°59′52″W

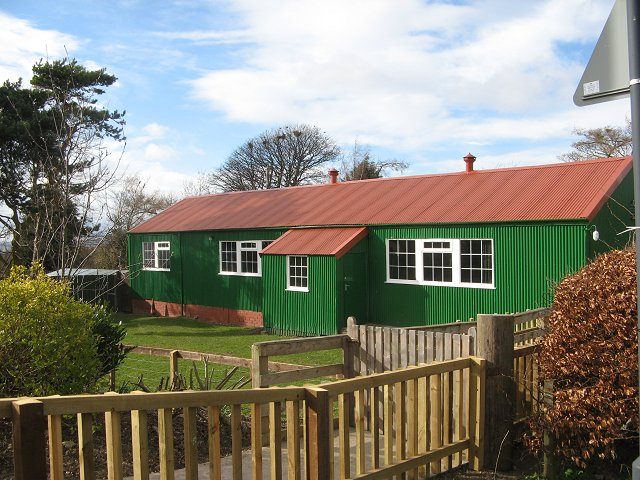
Cousland Village Hall

Cousland is a village in Midlothian, Scotland. It is located 4 kilometres (2.5 mi) east of Dalkeith and 3 kilometres (1.9 mi) west of Ormiston, on a hill between the Rivers Tyne and Esk.

== History ==
Cousland was a possession of the Sinclair family of Roslin from the late 12th century, and passed to the Ruthvens in the late 15th century. It formerly had its own chapelry, which was annexed to the parish of Cranston about the time of the Reformation.

In 1547, during the Rough Wooing, the English army led by Lord Hertford burned the village, around the time of the Battle of Pinkie which was fought nearby. The village was a centre of lime production from the 16th century. Cousland lime was used to build and repair Edinburgh's town walls, at Kelso Abbey in 1554, and was frequently used at Holyrood Palace for plastering and harling.

The Confederate Lords, opponents of Mary, Queen of Scots, gathered at Cousland in 1567 at the time of the stand-off at Carberry Hill. After the execution of William Ruthven, 1st Earl of Gowrie, in 1584, Cousland passed successively to the Herries, the Hays of Kinfauns, and the Macgills of Oxenfuird, before coming to the Dalrymples, later Earls of Stair, in the 1690s. Cousland Smiddy is a blacksmith's workshop built in the 18th century, which unusually remains in working order, and is a category B listed building.

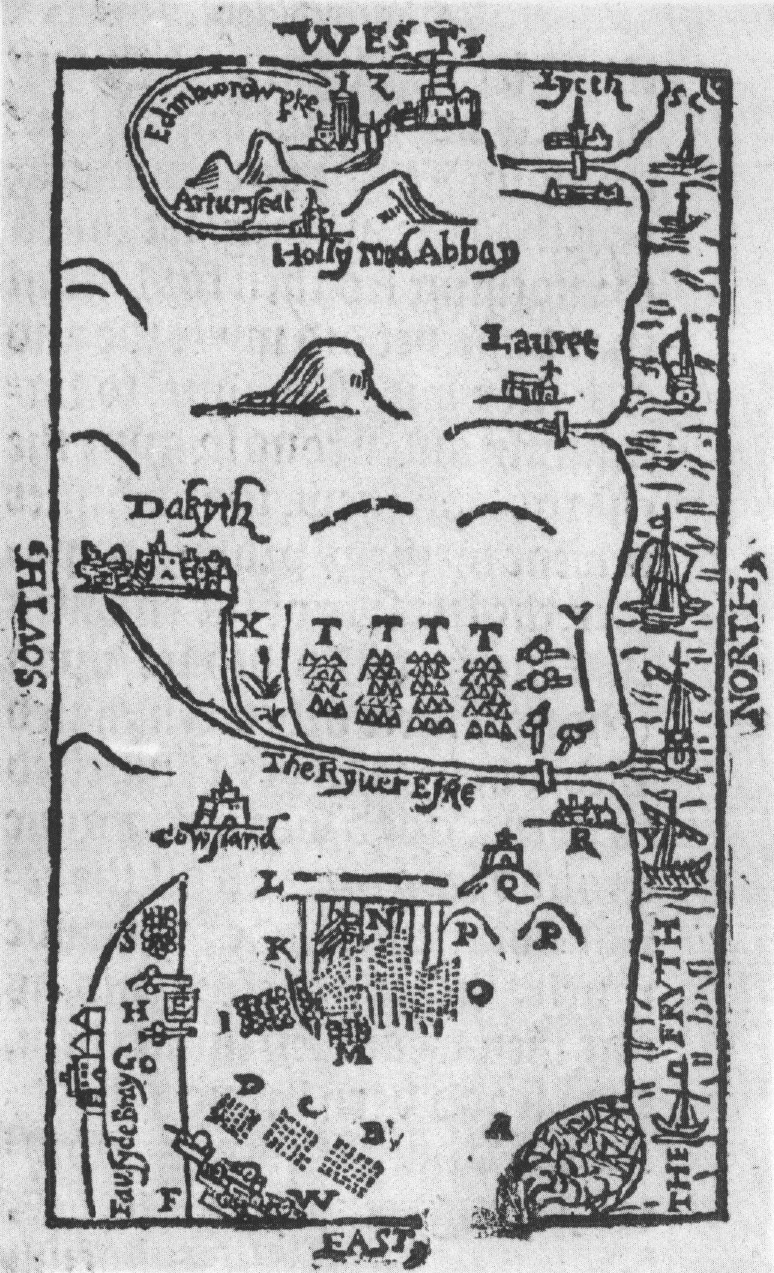
A contemporary sketch of the Battle of Pinkie shows "Cowſland" at centre-left, below "Dakyth"

An archaeological survey, the Big Cousland Dig, was carried out in 2007–2008, and focused on the sites of the castle, the windmill and an 18th-century pottery.

=== Cousland Castle ===
The ruins of a tower house and enclosure walls are located on the south side of the village. Although formerly thought to be a nunnery, the remains are now attributed to William Ruthven, 1st Lord Ruthven, and dated to the late 15th century. The original tower was extended to form a larger residence in the 16th century. The tower house had a vaulted basement, and was extended southwards. It stands at the north-east corner of a walled garden area, 68 metres (223 ft) square, enclosed by walls 85 centimetres (33 in) thick, probably constructed after 1690. The house was demolished after 1760, and the walls survive intact on the northern sides. The tower, house and walls are protected as a scheduled monument.

Dorothea Stewart, Countess of Gowrie, was commanded to surrender Dirleton, Ruthven, Cousland, and the Gowrie lodging in Perth to the crown in May 1584.
