= John Manningham =

English lawyer and diarist

John Manningham (1570s – 1622) was an English lawyer and diarist, a contemporary source for Elizabethan era and Jacobean era life and the London dramatic world, including William Shakespeare.

== Life ==
He was son of Robert Manningham of Fen Drayton, Cambridgeshire, by his wife Joan, daughter of John Fisher of Bledlow, Buckinghamshire.

He matriculated at Magdalene College, Cambridge around 1592, and graduated B.A. in 1596. On 16 March 1598 he entered as a student in the Middle Temple, and on 7 June 1605 he was called to the degree of an utter barrister.

A fellow-student, Edward, son of William Curll and brother of Walter Curll, obtained for him the post of auditor of the court of wards. He was also befriended by a distant relative, Richard Manningham, who, born at St Albans in 1539, made a fortune in London as a mercer, and in his old age retired to Bradbourne, near Maidstone. Richard Manningham died on 25 April 1611, and was buried in East Malling Church, where John Manningham erected a monument to his memory. To John, his sole executor, Richard left his house and lands in Kent.

== Diary ==
Manningham wrote a diary, preserved among the Harleian Manuscripts in the British Library, and first printed by the Camden Society in 1868, under the editorship of John Bruce. It covers the period from January 1602 to April 1603; at the time the writer was a student in the Middle Temple. The work is a medley of anecdotes of London life, political rumours, accounts of sermons, and memoranda of journeys. The gossip respecting Queen Elizabeth's illness and death and the accession of James I is set down in detail, and Manningham often supplies comments on the character of the chief lawyers and preachers of the day. He also gives an account of the performance of Shakespeare's Twelfth Night on 2 February 1602 in the Middle Temple Hall, and the Harefield Entertainment of August of that year.

John Payne Collier first called attention to Manningham's work. The anecdote of Shakespeare's triumph over Richard Burbage in the pursuit of the favors of a lady of doubtful virtue ("William the Conqueror was before Richard III") comes from his entry for 13 March 1602. Sir Thomas Bodley, John Stow, Sir Thomas Overbury and Barbara Ruthven are also occasionally mentioned.

== Family ==
Manningham married, about 1607, Ann, sister of his friend Curll. They had three sons and three daughters. Walter Curll, by his will of 15 March 1646–7, left legacies to his sister Ann Manningham and her son and his godson Walter.

== Notes ==
Attribution

- This article incorporates text from a publication now in the public domain: "Manningham, John". Dictionary of National Biography. London: Smith, Elder & Co. 1885–1900.
