= Patrick Vans, Lord Barnbarroch =

Scottish diplomat and judge (1529–1597)

Sir Patrick Vans of Barnbarroch (1529 – 22 July 1597), or Patrick Vaus, was a Scottish judge and diplomat.

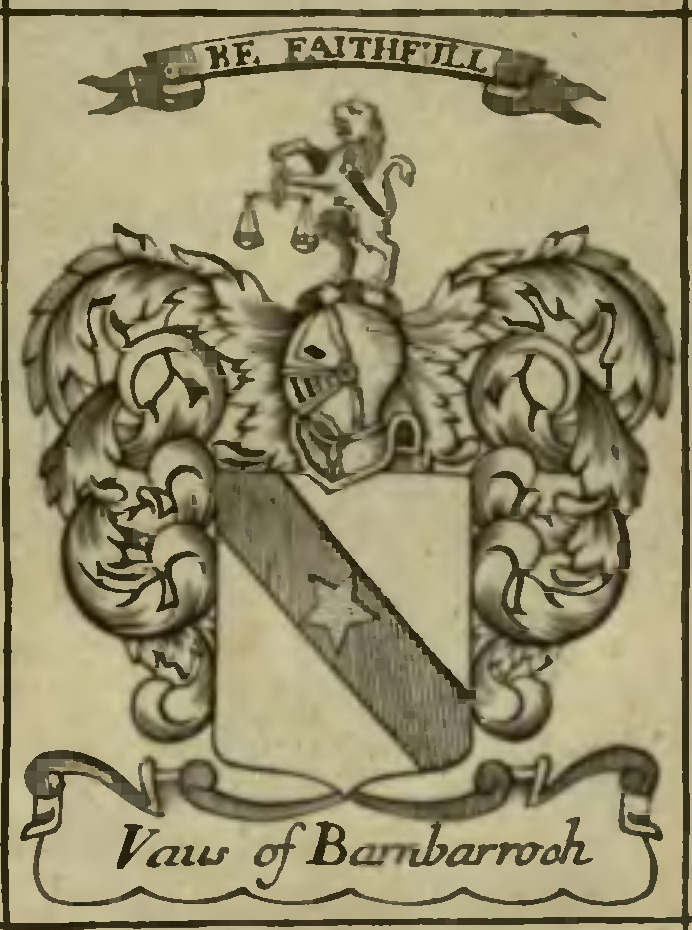
Heraldic achievement of Vans of Barnbarroch

== Early life ==
Patrick Vans was the second son of Sir John Vans of Barnbarroch and his wife, Janet MacCulloch, only child of Simon MacCulloch of Myreton, Keeper of Linlithgow Palace. He was born at Barnbarroch, near Wigtown.

Patrick studied Divinity, and became rector of Wigtown. In 1568 he succeeded to the family estates on the death of his elder brother, and on 1 January 1576 he was appointed an ordinary lord of session on the spiritual side with the title of Lord Barnbarroch. He was knighted in 1583. On 21 January 1587 he was admitted a member of the privy council.

== Mission to Denmark ==
In May 1587 he was sent with Peter Young and a retinue of 44 gentlemen and servants, as ambassadors to Denmark, to discuss the Orkney Islands and arrange for a marriage between James VI and Elizabeth, the elder sister of Anne, Princess of Denmark. James VI sent a Latin letter to Frederick II of Denmark recommending his ambassadors and hoping to receive a written answer.

The ambassadors hired John Gardiner's ship, the Lion of Leith. Barnbarroch wrote a journal of this mission, mentioning his arrival at Elsinore on 8 June 1587 and their stay with Richard Wedderburn. The next day he was met by the Captain of Kronborg and the Toll Master of the Sound, "Phalrik Boyall". The king, Frederick II of Denmark was at Antvorskov, and sent Gert Rantzau to welcome them. When they reached Antvorskov, with a wagon train provided by the king, David Myrtone, a relation of the Laird of Cambo in Fife, was sent ahead to the Chancellor Niels Kaas because he could speak German. Kaas told them that Frederick II was ill with toothache, and they spoke to Manderup Parsberg and Henrik Below, saying that only had commission to speak with the king. Barnbarroch's narrative breaks off before he describes his audience with Frederick, and a letter from Frederick to James VI suggests they were not given a formal audience at this time.

Richard Douglas heard in August 1587 that the ambassadors had returned, and Elizabeth was promised to Archduke Mathias (she married Henry Julius, Duke of Brunswick-Lüneburg). The King's marriage plans were to be discussed at Falkland Palace in September 1587.

When the ships conveying Anne of Denmark to Scotland in October 1589 were driven back by storms, James VI decided to send a special embassy to fetch her, Vans was named one of the principal ambassadors for that purpose, and, when the king resolved himself to embark, was especially chosen to accompany him. For this voyage he hired the Falcon of Leith from John Gibson. According to William Wallace of Failford, James VI described the Falcon as a little ship to Anna of Denmark's mother, Sophie of Mecklenburg-Güstrow.

Barnbarroch signed the ratification of the king's marriage contract at Oslo on 21 November 1589. The other witnesses were John Maitland, the Earl Marischal, the Provost of Lincluden, Lewis Bellenden, James Scrimgeour, Alexander Lindsay, John Carmichael, William Keith of Delny, William Stewart, John Skene, and George Young. On 30 November, at Oslo, James VI rewarded Barnbarroch with a charter for lands at Barnbarroch and Barglas.

When James VI decided to remain in Denmark until the spring, Barnbarroch returned to Scotland to report the marriage to the Privy Council, arriving in Scotland on 15 December. In 1592 he was elected a lord of the articles, and in June of the same year received an annual pension of £200 Scots. He was again chosen a lord of the articles on 16 July 1593, and at the same time was appointed to a commission for the provision of ministers and augmentation of stipends.

In December 1593, he was appointed to a committee to audit the account of money spent by the Chancellor, John Maitland of Thirlestane, on the royal voyages. The funds in question came from the English subsidy and the dowry of Anne of Denmark.

He died on 22 July 1597, and was succeeded by his son, Sir John Vans, one of the gentlemen of the chamber to King James.

The voyage to Denmark may be connected with the ballad "Sir Patrick Spens".

== Katherine Kennedy ==
Patrick Vaus married Elizabeth Kennedy, a daughter of Hugh Kennedy of Girvanmains and Janet Stewart on 17 August 1561 at Perth. It was a double wedding, the bride's half sister Dorothea Stewart married William Ruthven, Master of Ruthven.

Vaus married his second wife Katherine Kennedy in 1573, she was the daughter of Gilbert Kennedy, 3rd Earl of Cassillis and Margaret Kennedy (died 1580), a daughter of Thomas Kennedy of Bargany. They had at least ten children.

Her mother, Margaret Kennedy, Countess of Cassillis, wrote to Katherine Kennedy in November 1578 from Maybole Castle. She wanted her daughter, who was in Edinburgh, to buy velvet for a cloak to match a doublet and skirt, with a small "champ" or fielded pattern. The cloak should be lined with rabbit fur. She also wanted a marten fur to line a gown, and a furred petticoat. The countess wanted plain bracelets with a lock or clasp, and a "tablatt" or locket with a "just dyackle", a compass dial. She could buy a pearl for it cheaper than £3 herself. She also a "laich", low bed. She had received a description of a skirt made of "rammage" patterned velvet for the President of Session's wife Elizabeth Durham and wanted a cloak made of the same black fabric.

Some of Katherine's letters survive. She wrote to the steward at Barnbarroch, George Vaus, to instruct him to shear the sheep when the weather was right, to compel the farm servants to work at the mill by threatening to sell their goods, and see that Jonet MacDowall was spinning wool, some of the wool should be used for a new table cloth for her extending dining table. In September 1587 Vaus gave her and her factor William Dunbar rights to manage his rents and crops for three years for the 10,000 Scots that he owed her.

A son Richard Waus was granted the vicarage of Leswalt and Inch in Wigton in March 1580. This benefice was previously held by the master of the royal works William MacDowall.

== Published correspondence ==
Letters and papers belonging to Sir Patrick were published in two volumes by Robert Vans Agnew in 1887.

- Correspondence of Sir Patrick Waus of Barnbarroch, knight, volume 1
- Correspondence of Sir Patrick Waus of Barnbarroch, knight, volume 2

== Family ==
Patrick had the following children with Elizabeth Kennedy:

- Isobell Vans
- Margaret Vans
- Janet Vans
- Grissell Vans

He had the following children with Katherine Kennedy:

- Patrick Vans (d. 1649)
- Robert Vans
- Alexander Vans
- Eupheme Vans
- Elizabeth Vans
- Catherine Vans
- Jean Vans
- Florence Vans
- Mary Vans
- John Vans of Barnbarroch
