= Lord Methven =

Lord Methven was a title in the Peerage of Scotland. It was created on 17 July 1528 by King James V of Scotland for his stepfather Henry Stewart. The title became extinct on the death of the grantee's grandson in the 1580s. The title takes its name from Methven in Perthshire.

== Henry Stewart, 1st Lord Methven ==
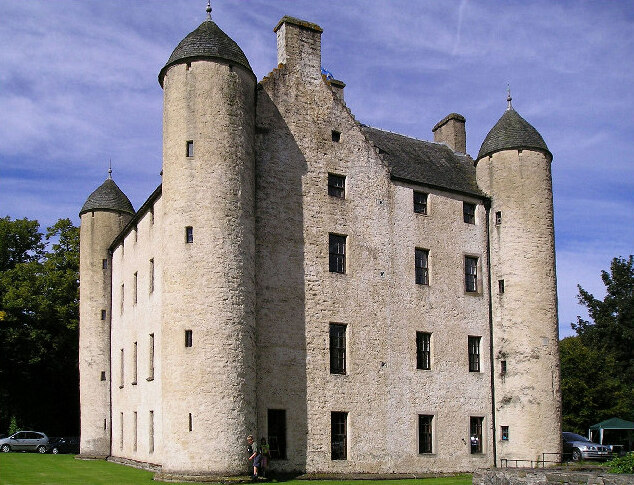
Methven Castle

Henry Stewart was born around 1497, a younger son of the Lord Avondale. He became the lover and eventual husband of Queen Margaret, widow of King James IV. When the Queen's son, King James V, assumed power he granted his mother and stepfather Methven Castle and raised him to the peerage. After the Queen's death in 1541, Lord Methven married Janet Stewart, widow of the Master of Sutherland (and mother of the 11th Earl) and daughter of John Stewart, 2nd Earl of Atholl. They were the parents of the second Lord Methven and of Dorothea Stewart, who married William Ruthven. Lady Methven later married her son-in-law's father Patrick Ruthven, 3rd Lord Ruthven.

== Henry Stewart, 2nd Lord Methven ==
Henry Stewart was born before his parents' marriage but legitimated in 1551. Some time after that date he succeeded as second Lord Methven. It was rumoured in March and April 1568 that the captive Mary, Queen of Scots might marry Lord Methven or George Douglas, relatives of Regent Moray.

He married Jean Ruthven, daughter of his stepfather the third Lord Ruthven and sister of his brother-in-law the fourth Lord; they were the parents of the third Lord Methven. Jean Ruthven wrote to him from Arbroath in March 1571, during the Marian Civil War. She was worried that Adam Gordon of Auchindoun, a supporter of Mary, Queen of Scots, was coming to Arbroath. At this time she was pregnant.

Lord Methven was killed on 3 March 1572 by a cannon-shot from Edinburgh Castle and was succeeded by his son. His widow later married Andrew Leslie, 5th Earl of Rothes.

== Henry Stewart, 3rd Lord Methven ==
Henry Stewart succeeded his father as third Lord Methven in 1572. He married Catherine, daughter of Henry Stewart and granddaughter of James Stewart, Earl of Arran, but they had no children and on his death the title became extinct. Methven Castle was granted to Ludovic Stewart, 2nd Duke of Lennox on 24 March 1586; the Duke's first wife was Sophia Ruthven, granddaughter of the first, niece of the second and first cousin of the last Lord Methven.
