= Richard Wedderburn =

Scottish merchant based in Denmark

Richard Wedderburn (floruit 1560-1602), was a Scottish merchant based in Denmark.

Richard Wedderburn was the eldest son of Alexander Wedderburn elder (1510–1589) and Isobel Anderson. He was a great uncle of David Wedderburne of Dundee who is known for his account book published in 1898. Richard's brother Patrick Wedderburn was also merchant and burgess in Dundee, but Richard was not recorded as a burgess or freeman of Dundee.

Wedderburn was a burgess or citizen of Elsinore or Helsingør in Denmark by 1568. He supplied timber for the roof of the kirk of Dundee in 1591.

In July 1573 his parents gave him part of their tenement in Dundee located in South Marketgate. He sold this property to his brother Patrick and his wife, Elizabeth Low, in 1590. Richard also had a property called the Chapel Yard in the Cowgate of Dundee.

He hosted Sir Patrick Vans of Barnbarroch, a Scottish ambassador negotiating the marriage of James VI of Scotland with Elizabeth the elder sister of Anne of Denmark, for a night at Elsinore on 8 June 1587. At that time Wedderburn loaned Mr John Learmonth money and Barnbarroch and Peter Young were his security for the debt of 18 Danish dollars and 8 shillings. Barnbarroch's kinsman, William Wallace of Failford mentioned meeting Wedderburn during the king's visit to Elsinore in 1590.

In 1590 Richard Wedderburn was given a license to export seven horses from Scotland, and a yearly quantity of wheat for making the flour used at the table of Christian IV of Denmark which he had been supplying for some years to Frederick II of Denmark.

In Danish records, which include payments for the Scottish wheat flour and green cloth supplied to the king, "Skotsk hvidemel" and "grønt klaede", his name appears as "Richardus Vederborn".

Another Scottish embassy, that of Lord Ogilvy and Peter Young, sent to attend the coronation of Christian IV in September 1596, stayed with him in August, and he claimed 516 dalers from the King of Denmark.

In 1600 he was involved in the transport of timber bought by Peder Munk for building work at Frederiksborg Castle.

Richard Wedderburn married three times. He died in 1602 and was buried at St. Olaf's Church, Helsingør where there is a carved slab commemorating him.
