= John Ruthven, 3rd Earl of Gowrie =

16th-century Scottish nobleman

The Earl of Gowrie
- Born: c. 1577; Perth, Scotland
- Died: 5 August 1600 (aged 22–23); Perth, Scotland
- Education: University of Edinburgh
- Parent(s): William Ruthven, 1st Earl of Gowrie; Dorothea Stewart

John Ruthven, 3rd Earl of Gowrie (c. 1577 – 5 August 1600) was a Scottish nobleman who died in mysterious circumstances, referred to as the "Gowrie Conspiracy", in which he and/or his brother Alexander were attempting to kill or kidnap King James VI of Scotland for unknown purposes. The king's retinue killed both brothers during the attack, and the king survived.

== Early life ==
John Ruthven was the second son of William Ruthven, 1st Earl of Gowrie, and his wife Dorothea Stewart. His brother James, the 2nd Earl, died in 1586, therefore John succeeded his brother as the Earl of Gowrie while still a child. The Ruthven family had a history of treason. (Note: The 1st Earl of Gowrie (c. 1541 – 1584), and his father, Patrick, 3rd Lord Ruthven (c. 1520 – 1566), had both been concerned in the murder of David Rizzio in 1566; and both took an active part on the side of the Kirk in the constant intrigues and factions among the Scottish nobility of the period. The former had been the custodian of Mary, Queen of Scots, during her imprisonment in Loch Leven, where, according to the queen, he had pestered her with amorous attentions; he had also been the chief actor in the plot known as the "raid of Ruthven" when King James VI was treacherously seized while a guest at Castle Ruthven in 1582, and kept under restraint for several months while the Earl remained at the head of the government. Though pardoned for this conspiracy the 1st Earl continued to plot against the king in conjunction with the earls of Mar and Angus; and he was executed for high treason on 2 May 1584; his friends complaining that the confession on which he was convicted of treason was obtained by a promise of pardon from the king. His eldest son, James, 2nd Earl of Gowrie, only survived till 1588, the family dignities and estates, which had been forfeited, having been restored to him in 1586 (McNeill 1911, p. 301; Juhala 2004).) Like his father and grandfather before him, Ruthven attached himself to the party of the reforming preachers, who procured his election in 1592 as Provost of Perth, a post that was almost hereditary in the Ruthven family. He was educated at Perth Grammar School and the University of Edinburgh, where he was in the summer of 1593, about the time when his mother, and his sister the Countess of Atholl, aided the Earl of Bothwell in forcing himself, sword in hand, into the king's bedchamber in Holyrood Palace.

A few months later Ruthven joined with earls of Atholl and Montrose in offering to serve Elizabeth I of England, then almost openly hostile to the Scottish king; and it is probable that he had also relations with the rebellious Bothwell. He travelled to Italy in 1597 with his tutor, William Rhynd, and they enrolled at the University of Padua in April. On his way home in 1599 he remained for some months at Geneva with the reformer Theodore Beza.

At Paris, he made acquaintance with the English ambassador, Henry Neville, who reported to Robert Cecil on 27 February 1599 that Ruthven was devoted to Elizabeth's service. Neville wrote that Ruthven would like to kiss Queen Elizabeth's hand, and said the Earl was loyal to the Protestant religion and the English queen. Gowrie would be able to give Cecil useful information regarding potential feared "alterations" in the political state of Scotland. In London he was received very favourably by Queen Elizabeth and her ministers.

In February 1600 he encountered William Stewart of Houston in a long gallery or passage in Holyrood Palace. Stewart had arrested the earl's father in 1584. The earl made to move out of Stewart's way then reconsidered at the urging of his servant Thomas Kinrosser. Stewart noted this and complained to the king as an offence to his long service and dignity, warning that Gowrie was a threat to the court. Gowrie was told about this, and said "Aquila non captat muscas", meaning "the eagle does not chase flies", that Stewart was beneath his attention.

The "Gowrie conspiracy" resulted in the killing of the earl and his brother by attendants of King James at Gowrie House, Perth. Gowrie House stood just inside Perth's town wall, next to the River Tay on the site now occupied by Perth Sheriff Court at the junction of Canal Street and Tay Street.

== Gowrie conspiracy ==
The Gowrie conspiracy or Gowrie Plot was a series of events unfolding on 5 August 1600. It is shrouded in mystery. Although the facts of the actual attack and deaths of the Ruthvens are known, the circumstances by which that sequence of events came about remain a mystery.

Ruthven had reason to seek vengeance on James VI as he had executed his father in response to the Ruthven Raid, which in turn was inspired by high debts of the King to the Ruthven family. Getting rid of the family got rid of the debts, especially if the family was stripped of all ownership for reason of "treason". Rumours circulated that Anne of Denmark was involved in the Gowrie Conspiracy, and it was said that a letter had been found from her to the Earl of Gowrie, urging him to visit the royal court and enclosing the gift of a valuable bracelet.

== Aftermath ==
The events at Gowrie House caused intense excitement throughout Scotland. The investigation of the circumstances was also followed with much interest in England where all the details were reported to Elizabeth's ministers. The ministers of the Kirk, whose influence in Scotland was too extensive for the king to neglect, were persuaded, but with great difficulty, to accept James's account of the occurrence. He voluntarily submitted himself to cross-examination by one of their number.

The ministers' belief, and that of their partisans, no doubt influenced by political hostility toward James, was that the king had invented the story of a conspiracy by Gowrie to cover his own design to extirpate the Ruthven family. James gave some colour to this belief, which has not been entirely abandoned, by the relentless severity with which he pursued the two younger, and unquestionably innocent, brothers of the earl. A more tangible motive for mutual discontent is to be found in the fact that the king was Gowrie's debtor to the extent of no less than £80,000 representing a sum of £48,063 due to his father while treasurer, with the interest at 10% per annum for the succeeding years. With this sum the old Earl of Gowrie, when treasurer, was forced to burden himself in order to meet the current expenses of the government. It was probably his inability to meet the obligations incurred by his father that had compelled the young earl to remain abroad; and on his return he presented a petition to the court of session, stating that he was unfit to pay any more to his creditors than he had done already, and asking to be relieved of these royal debts. In answer to his application he on 20 June 1600 obtained a protection from debt for a year.

Great efforts were made by the government to prove the complicity of others in the plot. One noted and dissolute conspirator, Sir Robert Logan of Restalrig, was posthumously convicted of having been privy to the Gowrie conspiracy on the evidence of certain letters produced by a notary, George Sprot, who swore they had been written by Logan to Gowrie and others. These letters, which are still in existence, were in fact forged by Sprot in imitation of Logan's handwriting; but the researches of Andrew Lang have shown cause for suspecting that the most important of them was either copied by Sprot from a genuine original by Logan, or that it embodied the substance of such a letter. If this is correct, it would appear that the conveyance of the king to Fast Castle, Logan's impregnable fortress on the coast of Berwickshire, was part of the plot; and it supplies, in all events, an additional piece of evidence to prove the genuineness of the Gowrie conspiracy. Robert Logan died before May 1608 the last of his line; George Sprot was hanged at the Market Cross of Edinburgh for foreknowledge of the conspiracy on 12 August 1608.

Forfeiture of the Earl of Gowrie Act 1600
- Act of Parliament
- Parliament of Scotland
- Long title: Act anent the dishereising and inhabilitie of the brether and posteritie of the erle of Gowrie.
- Citation: 1600 c. 1

Dates
- Royal assent: 15 November 1600

On 7 August 1600, James's Privy Council of Scotland ordered that the corpses of Gowrie and his brother should remain unburied until further decisions were made over the matter, and that no person with the name of Ruthven should approach within ten miles of the court. Orders were also sent for the apprehension of the earl's brothers William and Patrick, but they fled to England. The bodies of Gowrie and his brother Robert were disembowelled and preserved by one James Melville, who, however, was paid for his services, not by the magistrates of Perth, but by the Privy Council; and on 30 October they were sent to Edinburgh to be produced at the bar of Parliament. On 15 November, the estates of the Ruthvens were discerned by Parliament via the Forfeiture of the Earl of Gowrie Act 1600 (c. 1) to be forfeited and their family name and honours extinct.

The corpses of the Earl and his brother were hanged and quartered at the Mercat Cross in Edinburgh on 19 November 1600. Their heads were put on spikes at Edinburgh's Old Tolbooth and their arms and legs upon spikes at various locations around Perth.

Name of Ruthven Act 1600
- Act of Parliament
- Parliament of Scotland
- Long title: Act aboleissing the surname of Ruthven.
- Citation: 1600 c. 2

Dates
- Royal assent: 15 November 1600

Another act, the Name of Ruthven Act 1600 (c. 2) was further passed abolishing the name of Ruthven, ordering that the house wherein the tragedy happened should be levelled to the ground, and decreeing that the barony of Ruthven should henceforth be known as the barony of Huntingtower. In a letter of November 1600, the Patrick Gray, 6th Lord Gray described the aftermath of the Gowrie Conspiracy. The Ruthven family were ordered to change their surname, and the House of Ruthven near Perth was renamed as Huntingtower.

Some suspicion had fallen on Anne of Denmark, and the sisters Beatrix and Barbara Ruthven were barred from her presence. In October 1600, the French ambassador in London heard that Anne of Denmark (who was pregnant) kept to her chamber, in a state of undress, and complained of the absence of the Ruthven sisters. Some courtiers were removed from her household after the birth of her child (Prince Charles). Despite her protests, her enemy, Sir Thomas Erskine, was made captain of the royal guard.

Master John Gordon wrote to James VI about commemorating the events with verse and a monument. James VI wrote to Gordon that the master of work William Schaw would "conferre with yow thairanent, that ye maye agree upon the forme, devyse, and superscriptionis".

== Family ==
Ruthven's two younger brothers, William and Patrick, fled to England. The brothers went to Berwick-upon-Tweed and lived in hiding for a month, until the marshal of the town Sir John Carey helped them travel to Durham and Cambridge.

William Ruthven died in France prior to 1622.

After the 1603 accession of James to the English throne, it was reported that one of the brothers was captured at an inn at Kirkby Malzeard near Ripon, by Francis Wandesford who had seen him three years earlier at Durham. Wandesford delivered him to Sir William Ingleby of Ripley Castle. It was thought that Patrick Ruthven was captured in London in June 1603, but the mayor Robert Lee discovered this was a case of mistaken identity. Later Patrick was captured and imprisoned for nineteen years in the Tower of London. After his release in August 1622, Patrick Ruthven resided first at Cambridge and afterwards in Somersetshire, being granted a small pension by the crown. He married Elizabeth Woodford, widow of Lord Gerrard, by whom he had two sons and a daughter, Mary. The latter entered the service of Queen Henrietta Maria and married the Dutch painter Anthony van Dyck, who painted several portraits of her; after Van Dyck's death, she married Sir Richard Pryse, 1st Baronet of Gogerddan. Patrick died in poverty in a cell in the King's Bench in 1652, being buried as "Lord Ruthven". His son, also named Patrick, presented a petition to Oliver Cromwell in 1656, in which, after reciting that the parliament of Scotland in 1641 had restored his father to the barony of Ruthven, he prayed that his "extreme poverty" might be relieved by the bounty of the Protector.

Sisters Barbara and Beatrix were helped by Anne of Denmark, and Barbara Ruthven went to London. Beatrix (died 1625) married John Home of Cowdenknowes; and they were grandparents of James Home, 3rd Earl of Home.

== Notes ==
Peerage of Scotland
Preceded by James Ruthven	Earl of Gowrie; 1586–1600	Forfeit
