= Huntingtower Castle =

Castle in Perth and Kinross, Scotland

Coordinates: 56.4094°N 3.4883°W

Huntingtower Castle, once known as Ruthven Castle or the Place of Ruthven, is located near the village of Huntingtower beside the A85 and near the A9, about 5 km NW of the centre of Perth, Perth and Kinross, in central Scotland, on the main road to Crieff. This castle is the subject for several local ghostlore stories.

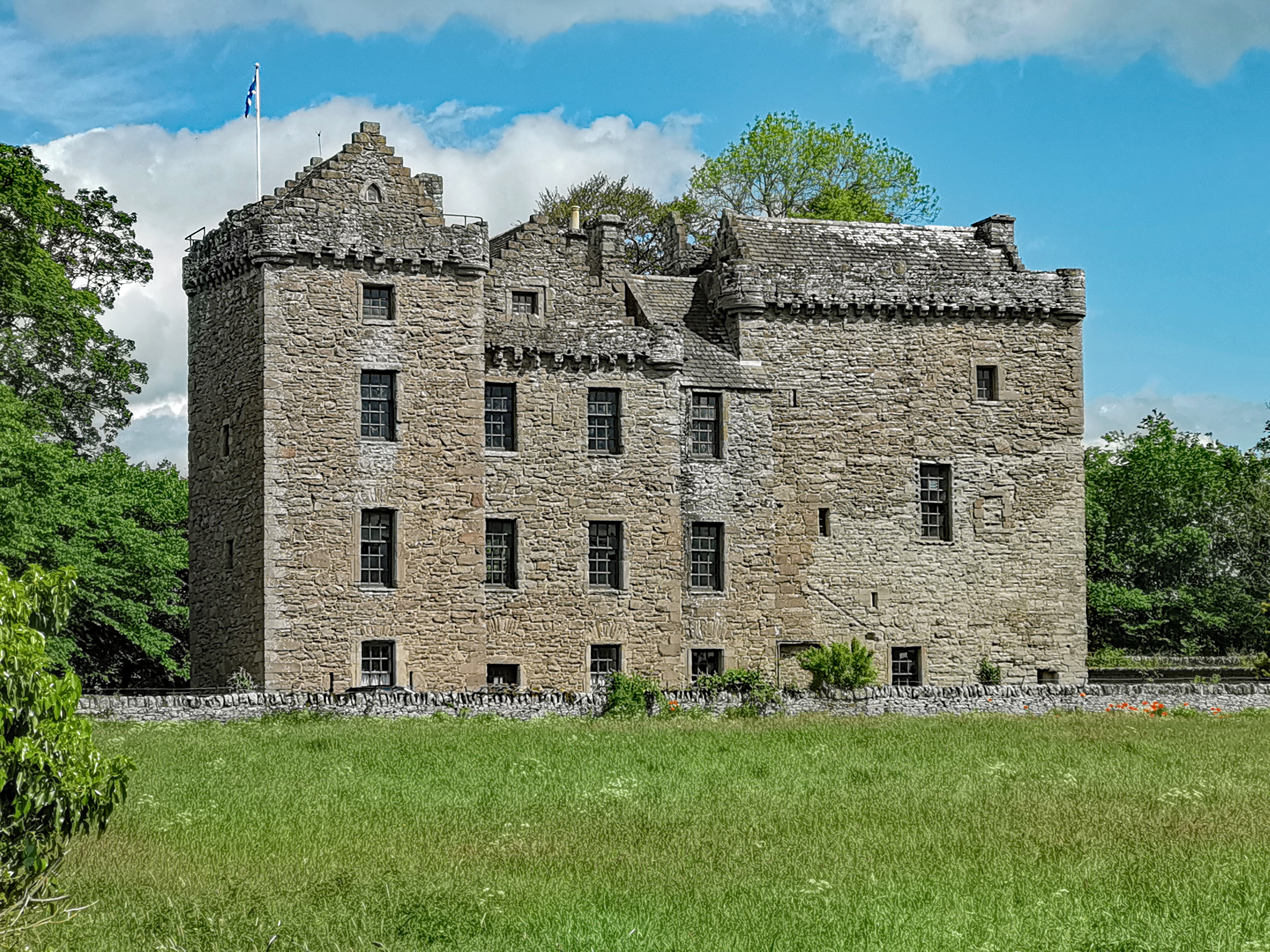
Huntingtower Castle

== History ==
Huntingtower Castle was built at least by the 14th century as it was one of the castles owned by the Lords of Badenoch. Alexander Stewart, Earl of Buchan, called the Wolf of Badenoch for his misdeeds, died there in 1394.

Later, in the 15th century the castle was claimed by the Huntly family, or by the Clan Ruthven family. It was known for several hundred years as the 'House (or 'Place') of Ruthven' or 'Ruthven Castle', or simply 'Ryffane', until the family was forfeited for the Gowrie Conspiracy in 1600 and the Ruthven name was suppressed by Act of Parliament. As contemporary writers reported, the "prinsipall howse callyd Ryven is now callyd the Huntynge towre" and, "the House of Riven to be called Hunt towre". The Ruthvens also had a substantial townhouse in nearby Perth, called Gowrie House.

Mary, Queen of Scots visited on 25 June and 16 September 1565. Regent Morton made a progress in Fife in September 1575, and while he was at Ballinbreich Castle he was summoned to Huntingtower (Ruthven) to the christening of James Ruthven, the heir.

In the summer of 1582, the castle was occupied by the 4th Lord Ruthven, who was also the 1st Earl of Gowrie, and his family. Gowrie was involved in a plot to kidnap the young King James VI, son of Mary, Queen of Scots. On 22 or 23 August 1582, Gowrie and his associates seized the young king at Huntingtower, then known as "Ruthven Castle". James was held prisoner for 10 months in various locations. This kidnapping is known as the 'Raid of Ruthven' and the Protestant conspirators behind it hoped to gain power through controlling the king. James Stewart, Earl of Arran was imprisoned in Ruthven Castle. James eventually escaped from his captors at St Andrews on 27 June 1583.

James VI forgave Gowrie, and returned for a banquet at the "House of Ruthven", but after a second abortive attempt by Gowrie and others to overthrow him, Gowrie was finally executed and his property (including Huntingtower) was forfeited to the crown. Dorothea Stewart, Countess of Gowrie, was commanded to surrender Dirleton, Huntingtower ("Ruthven"), Cousland, and the Gowrie lodging in Perth to the crown in May 1584.

James VI and his young cousin Ludovic, Duke of Lennox stayed at Huntingtower in September 1584, as a German traveller Lupold von Wedel noted. After around 10 days, there was news of plague in nearby Perth, where some of the servants were staying, and so the king and a few followers went on to Tullibardine Castle and then to Stirling Castle. The rest of the royal household remained in quarantine enclosed at Huntingtower.

The Castle and lands were restored to the Ruthven family in 1586. The king visited for a week in September 1587. However, in 1600, the brothers John and Alexander Ruthven were accused, some say falsely, of attempting to kidnap King James, and were killed in Gowrie House, the Ruthven home in Perth, by an overwhelming number of the king's armed men. This time, the king was less merciful: as well as seizing the estates, he abolished the name of Ruthven and decreed that any successors would be ineligible to hold titles or lands. Thus the House of Ruthven ceased to exist and by royal proclamation Ruthven castle was renamed Huntingtower.

David Murray, 1st Viscount of Stormont was made keeper. James VI stayed in April 1601, writing the new name "Huntingtower" on his letters. In 1605 the Privy Council heard that woods, yards or gardens, and windows of Huntingtower had been damaged by members of the Clan Gregor. King James heard the castle needed repairs in 1623 and ordered his surveyor, James Murray to report. There is no record of repairs in that year.

The Castle remained in the possession of the crown until 1643 when it was given to the family of Murray of Tullibardine (from whom the Dukes of Atholl and Mansfield are descended). John Murray, 1st Duke of Atholl resided in the Castle, where his wife Lady Mary Ross bore a son 7 February 1717. The Castle began to be neglected and after Lady Mary died in 1767, it was abandoned as a place of residence except by farm labourers. The last inhabitants of the castle were the family of the castle custodian Niel Cowan. The Cowan family of Niel, Margaret, Alexander and Lorraine left in late 2002.

Today, the castle can be visited by the public and is sometimes used as a venue for marriage ceremonies. It is in the care of Historic Scotland (open all year; entrance charge).

== Architecture ==
The original 'Huntingtower' (now known as the 'Eastern Tower') was a free-standing building, constructed primarily as a gatehouse. It consists of three storeys and a garret under the roof. Around the end of the 15th century a second tower (the 'Western Tower') was built alongside the Huntingtower, with a gap of about 3 metres between them. This second tower was L-shaped in plan and was connected to the Huntingtower by a wooden bridge below the level of the battlements. It is thought that this construction was for defensive reasons: if one tower was attacked and taken, residents could flee into the second and draw up the bridge between the two. The space between the two towers was built up in the late 17th century resulting in the Castle as it stands today. At the same time the number and size of windows was greatly increased, particularly in the Western Tower.

A great hall was built against the north side of the Western Tower in the 16th century, but nothing remains of it above ground except a raggle showing the position of the roof against the Tower. The defensive walls that originally enclosed the Castle (and probably other vanished subsidiary buildings) have also been removed.

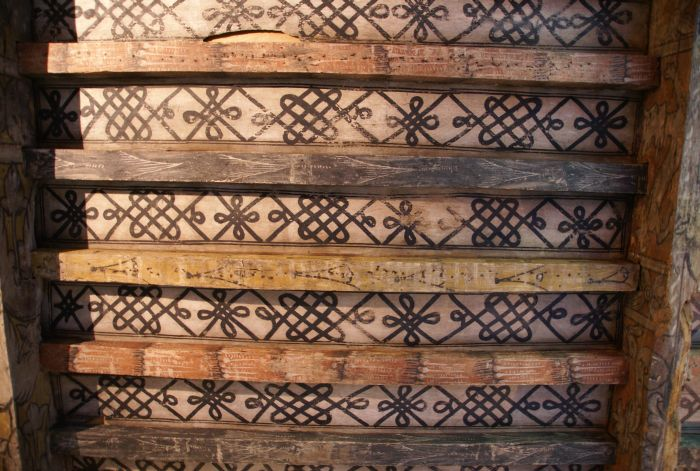
The painted ceiling at Huntingtower Castle

Among the features of interest at Huntingtower are early 16th-century paintings which survive on the first floor of the Eastern Tower. These include fragmentary wall paintings showing flowers, animals and Biblical scenes, and a largely complete decorative scheme on the wooden ceiling. Among the designs are grotesque animals (including a version of the Green Man) on the main beams, and Renaissance-style knotwork patterns on the overlying planks. This painted ceiling is believed to be the earliest of its kind to survive substantially in Scotland. Minor fragments of wall-paintings also survive in the Western Tower.

The early preservation and conservation of the painted ceiling was conducted by the Office of Works. Frank Baines sought advice from the expert chemist Arthur Pillans Laurie of Heriot-Watt University in 1912. He advised using a weak solution of gelatine to fix the flaking paint pigment.

== Ghostlore and other legends ==
Huntingtower is said to be haunted by "Lady Greensleeves", a young woman named Dorothea who was the daughter of the 1st Earl of Gowrie. The legend states that she was in love with a servant at the castle and that the two used to have clandestine meetings at night in the eastern tower, where the servants slept. One night the girl's mother, the Countess, is supposed to have discovered what was going on and made her way across the bridge from the family's quarters in the western tower to the eastern tower to catch the pair. Dorothea heard her mother's footsteps on the bridge and, unable to return to the other tower by that route, made her way to the roof. Here she leapt from the tower to land safely on the battlements of the western tower and so return to bed where she was discovered by her mother. The distance between the towers was several metres and thus she accomplished quite a feat in leaping the distance. The following day the girl and her lover eloped and no records exist to tell us what happened to them.

A number of sightings of the figure of a tall young woman in a green silk dress have been seen in and around Huntingtower over the years, usually at dusk but sometimes in full daylight. Her appearance is said to be an ill omen and a forewarning of some disaster to come. A traveller staying at Huntingtower in the 1930s is reported to have seen Lady Greensleeves in a corridor of the castle. The following day he resumed his journey to Fife and was drowned when he fell from the ferry taking him across the River Tay.

A second Huntingtower legend concerns St Conval's Well, which is beside the road below the castle. The water from this well is meant to have the power to heal, but those who go to collect it must do so in silence: any word spoken on the outward or return journey renders the water useless. Those who go to fetch water are also supposed to leave a small token behind at the well, such as a coin or charm. The well is in good condition and to this day runs clear.

== Notable persons ==
George Turnbull was brought up nearby. He was the Chief Engineer building the first railway from Calcutta (the then commercial capital of India): 541 miles to Benares en route to Delhi.
