= William Ruthven, 1st Earl of Gowrie =

Scottish peer (1541–1584)

William Ruthven, 1st Earl of Gowrie, 4th Lord of Ruthven (c. 1541 – May 1584) was a Scottish peer known for devising the Raid of Ruthven.

== Life and career ==
William Ruthven was born in 1541 in Ruthven Castle, in Perthshire, Scotland, the son of Patrick Ruthven, 3rd Lord Ruthven and Janet Douglas. On 23 August 1581, he was named Earl of Gowrie by James VI of Scotland.

He and his father had both been involved in the murder of David Rizzio in 1566; and both took an active part on the side of the Kirk in the constant intrigues and factions among the Scottish nobility of the period. William had been the custodian of Mary, Queen of Scots, during her imprisonment in Lochleven Castle, where, according to the queen, he had pestered her with amorous attentions. According to Mary's secretary Claude Nau, Ruthven secretly made an offer to Queen Mary for her freedom. The old Lady Lochleven, Margaret Erskine reported him to her son, William Douglas, Laird of Lochleven and he was removed from his duty.

Ruthven wrote a friendly letter to his "great aunt", Margaret Douglas, Countess of Lennox, in June 1571 during the Marian Civil War. He asked about the health of her son Charles Stuart, 1st Earl of Lennox and hoped for peaceful times in which she could visit Scotland. He said the young James VI was growing tall.

On 22 or 23 August 1582, Ruthven devised and undertook the Raid of Ruthven, a successful plot to seize the 15-year-old King James during a visit to his castle near Perth, now known as Huntingtower Castle. James was held captive until his escape at St Andrews on 27 June 1583. Ruthven remained at the head of the government for several months during the king's detention.

Ruthven was the last-known custodian of the silver casket that contained the Casket Letters; letters said to have been written by Mary, Queen of Scots, implicating her in the murder of her husband, Henry Stuart, Lord Darnley.

== Arrest and execution ==
Ruthven was arrested at his house in Dundee by Colonel William Stewart. Stewart surrounded the house with 100 soldiers from 3 o'clock in the morning to 3 o'clock in the afternoon before Ruthven surrendered, at which point the town of Dundee received an order from James VI to take arms against him. Ruthven was shipped to Leith and brought to Holyrood Palace. He was taken to Kinneil House and then to Stirling Castle. His trial was held in Mar's Wark or "Lady Mar's house" at Stirling. The judges included John Graham, Lord Hallyards. The charges, recorded by Roger Aston, included "witchcraft in conferring with sorcerers".

He was beheaded at Stirling on 3 May 1584 because of his leading involvement in the Raid of Ruthven and all of his honours were forfeited.

Following his execution, his lands were divided among the king's favourites, but the honours were restored to his son James in 1586.

His widow, Dorothea Stewart came to the opening of Parliament on 22 August 1584 and kneeled on the Royal Mile crying to the king for grace for her children. James Stewart, Earl of Arran pushed her away, and she fainted and was left on the street.

A letter produced in the posthumous trial of Robert Logan of Restalrig in 1609 referred to William Ruthven as Greysteil, a character in a popular poem of his time noted for his strength and sinister powers, enthralled to a powerful woman.

== Marriage and children ==
William Ruthven was married to Dorothea Stewart, the oldest daughter of Henry Stewart, 1st Lord Methven and Janet Stewart, daughter of John Stewart, 2nd Earl of Atholl.

Scots Peerage lists 14 children of William and Dorothea, ten daughters and four sons:

- James Ruthven, 2nd Earl of Gowrie (died 1588)
- John Ruthven, 3rd Earl of Gowrie (c. 1577 – 5 August 1600)
- Alexander Ruthven (12 January 1580 – 5 August 1600)
- William Ruthven, died in France prior to 1622
- Patrick Ruthven, imprisoned for 19 years in the Tower of London. Father of Mary Ruthven, who married the painter Anthony van Dyck.
- Mary Ruthven, married to John Stewart, 5th Earl of Atholl, and after his death married John Stewart, 1st Earl of Atholl (1566–1603)
- Margaret Ruthven, married to John Graham, 4th Earl of Montrose, and was mother of James Graham, 1st Marquess of Montrose
- Sophia Ruthven (died May 1592), first wife of Ludovic Stewart, 2nd Duke of Lennox
- Jean Ruthven, mother of James Ogilvy, 1st Earl of Airlie
- Elizabeth "Isabel" Ruthven, who married Robert Gordon of Lochinvar, and was mother of John Gordon, 1st Viscount of Kenmure
- Beatrix Ruthven, lady in waiting to Anne of Denmark, wife of John Home of Cowdenknowes
- Lilias, about whom little is known, the English ambassador wrote she was "dead also with sorrow" after her father's execution in May 1584.
- Dorothea, who married John Wemyss of Pittencrieff
- Barbara Ruthven, lady in waiting to Anne of Denmark

Another source, Paterson's History of the Counties of Ayr and Wigton lists another daughter named Elizabeth, explicitly called "Elizabeth (Not Isabel)":

- Elizabeth Ruthven (died 1617), second wife of Sir Hugh Campbell of Loudon (died 1622).

There were plans in 1591 for Dorothea Stewart, Countess of Gowrie to marry William Keith of Delny but James VI forbade it.

John and Alexander Ruthven were killed on 5 August 1600 as the main characters in The Gowrie Conspiracy, a failed attempt to kidnap or murder James VI.

== Sources ==
Peerage of Scotland
New creation	Earl of Gowrie; 1581–1584	Succeeded by James Ruthven
Preceded by Patrick Ruthven	Lord Ruthven; 1566–1584	Succeeded by James Ruthven
