= Colin Campbell, 6th Earl of Argyll =

Scottish nobleman and politician

Colin Campbell, 6th Earl of Argyll (c. 1542– October 1584) was a Scottish nobleman and politician. He was appointed to the Lord Chancellorship of Scotland.

== Biography ==
He was the eldest son of Archibald Campbell, 4th Earl of Argyll and his second wife Margaret Graham. He was a younger half-brother of Archibald Campbell, 5th Earl of Argyll. His maternal grandparents were William Graham, 3rd Earl of Menteith and Margaret Moubray.

Argyll made a progress in Lorne, Argyll, and Cowal in July 1574 holding courts and executing those convicted of "slaughter, murder, theft, or common sorcery." Around 160 people were executed by hanging. Some "women and men suspected of witchcraft and sorcery were apprehended" and kept in prison or released on caution, until further trial. Argyll also ensured churches had ministers or readers teaching the Bible in Scottish Gaelic as translated by the late John Carswell, Bishop of the Isles. He sought the resolution of feuds between Aonghus MacDonald of Kintyre and Lachlan Mor Maclean, and MacConnell Gorm, Lord of the Isles, and the Laird of Glengarry.

In May 1583, James VI granted Colin Argyll and his wife Annas or Agnes Keith the lands of Lundie, Forfarshire.

== Marriages and family ==
Colin was first married to Joan Stewart, daughter of Henry Stewart, 1st Lord Methven and his second wife Janet Stewart. (Her maternal grandparents were John Stewart, 2nd Earl of Atholl and Lady Janet Campbell. Janet was a daughter of Archibald Campbell, 2nd Earl of Argyll and Elizabeth Stewart. Elizabeth was a daughter of John Stewart, 1st Earl of Lennox and Margaret Montgomerie. Margaret was a daughter of Alexander Montgomerie, 1st Lord Montgomerie and Margaret Boyd.)

In January 1572, he married secondly Agnes or Annas Keith, Countess of Moray. She was a daughter of William Keith, 4th Earl Marischal and his wife Margaret Keith. Their first child was a stillborn son. They had three children:

- Archibald Campbell, 7th Earl of Argyll (c. 1575–1638).
- Colin Campbell of Lundie (died c. 1650).
- Jane Campbell

He died in 1584, and was buried at Kilmun Parish Church.

He had written his will at Darnaway Castle in September 1584. His goods included 18 pieces of tapestry at Castle Campbell and three horns set in silver.

Legal offices
Preceded by The 5th Earl of Argyll	Lord Justice General; 1579–1584	Succeeded by The 7th Earl of Argyll
Political offices
Preceded by The 4th Earl of Atholl	Lord Chancellor of Scotland; 1579–1584	Succeeded by The Earl of Arran
Peerage of Scotland
Preceded by Archibald Campbell	Earl of Argyll; 1573–1584	Succeeded by Archibald Campbell
