= Henry Stewart, 1st Lord Methven =

16th-century Scottish noble

Henry Stewart
- Arms of Henry Stewart, 1st Lord Methven.
- Born: c. 1495
- Died: c. 1552 (aged 56–57)
- Title: 1st Lord Methven
- Spouses: Margaret Tudor (m. 1528; died 1541) Janet Stewart (m. 1544)
- Parent(s): Andrew Stewart, 1st Lord Avondale; Margaret Kennedy

Henry Stewart, 1st Lord Methven (c. 1495 – 1552) was Master of the Scottish Artillery and third, and last husband, of Margaret Tudor, eldest daughter of Henry VII of England and Elizabeth of York.

== Ancient lineage ==
He was a son of Andrew Stewart, 1st Lord Avondale, and his wife Margaret Kennedy. His brother was Andrew Stewart, 1st Lord Ochiltree. Henry was a fifth-generation male-line descendant of Murdoch Stewart, 2nd Duke of Albany, through his son Walter. He was thus a fourth cousin, twice removed of James IV of Scotland, first husband of Margaret Tudor.

== Marriage to the Queen mother ==
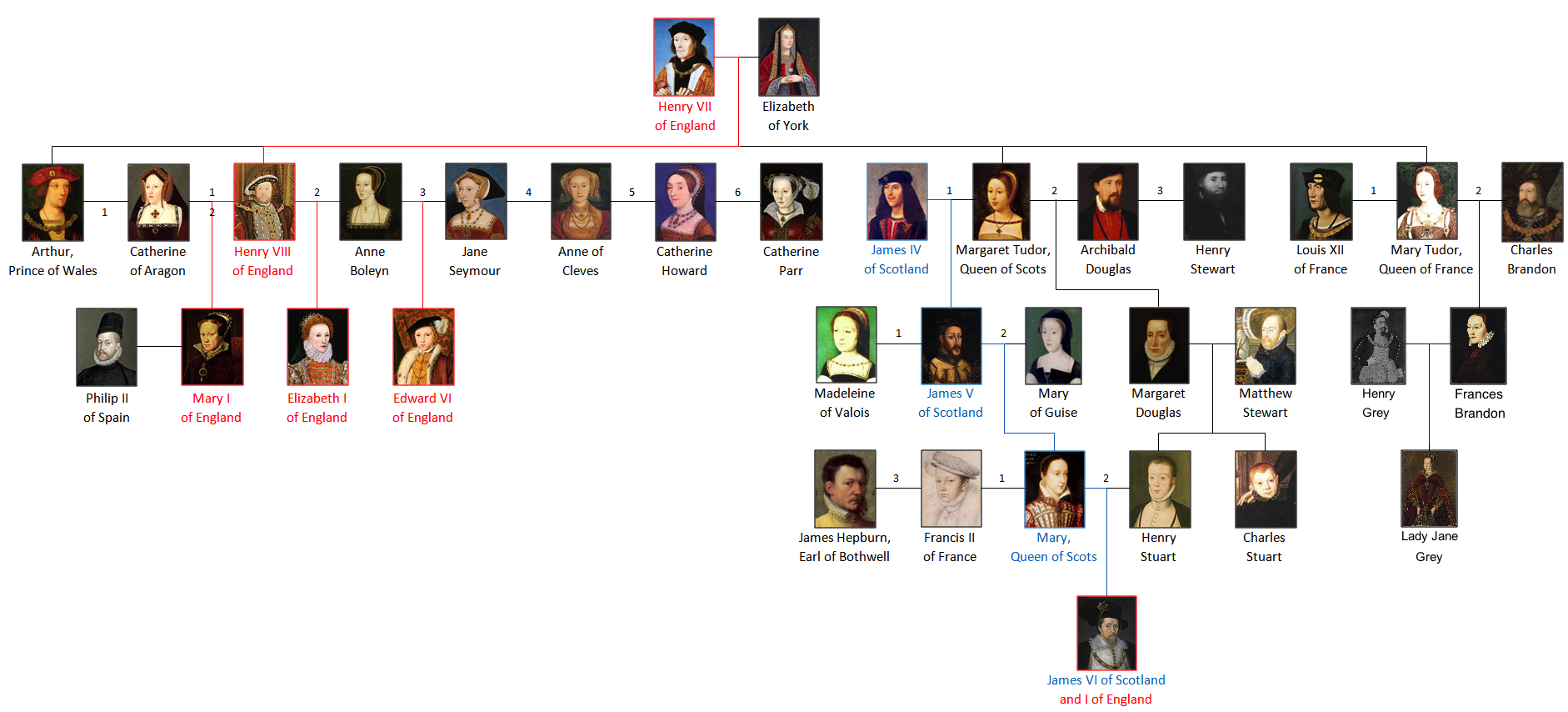
Henry Stewart shown with Margaret Tudor on the Tudor family tree

His friendship with Margaret Tudor, the queen mother, was first noted in September 1524, and he was appointed master carver to James V, directory of Chancery, and Master of Artillery. In January 1525, when Margaret Tudor was ill, he threatened the secretary of the Duke of Albany, offering to throw him down the stairs to her apartments at Edinburgh Castle.

Henry and Margaret Tudor were married on 3 March 1528, after Margaret's long-sought divorce from her second husband, Archibald Douglas, 6th Earl of Angus, was finally granted in March 1527 by Pope Clement VII. Margaret was already the mother of James V of Scotland, with her first husband, James IV, and Margaret Douglas, with Angus. They had no issue surviving most records, which were destroyed by order of James VI. Reaction to the marriage was swift: Margaret and Henry were besieged at Stirling Castle by Lord Erskine, with the support of James V and her former husband, the Earl of Angus. Henry was imprisoned.

However, after James V escaped from the care of the Douglas family and joined his mother at Stirling Castle, Henry was created Lord Methven. Margaret made him captain of her castle of Newark in Ettrick. In 1539, Henry and Margaret let their coalfield at Skeoch to John Craigyngelt. As rent he would supply 100 loads to Margaret's lodging at Stirling Castle.

== Second marriage ==
Henry was discovered to have been keeping a mistress in one of Margaret's castles. Margaret Tudor wished to divorce him but James V was reluctant to allow it. After she died in 1541, Methven was able to marry his mistress, Janet Stewart, daughter of John Stewart, 2nd Earl of Atholl and Lady Janet Campbell. Her maternal grandparents were Archibald Campbell, 2nd Earl of Argyll and Elizabeth Stewart. Elizabeth was a daughter of John Stewart, 1st Earl of Lennox and Margaret Montgomerie. Margaret was a daughter of Alexander Montgomerie, 1st Lord Montgomerie and Margaret Boyd.

Henry and Janet were parents to four children:

- Henry Stewart, 2nd Lord Methven (d. 3 March 1572).
- Dorothea Stewart, who married William Ruthven, 1st Earl of Gowrie.
- Joan Stewart. Married Colin Campbell, 6th Earl of Argyll.
- Margaret Stewart. Married (1st) Andrew Stuart, Master of Ochiltree, eldest son of Andrew Stewart, 2nd Lord Ochiltree (who was her paternal cousin); (2nd) Uchtred Macdowall of Garthland

=== Master of the Royal Artillery ===
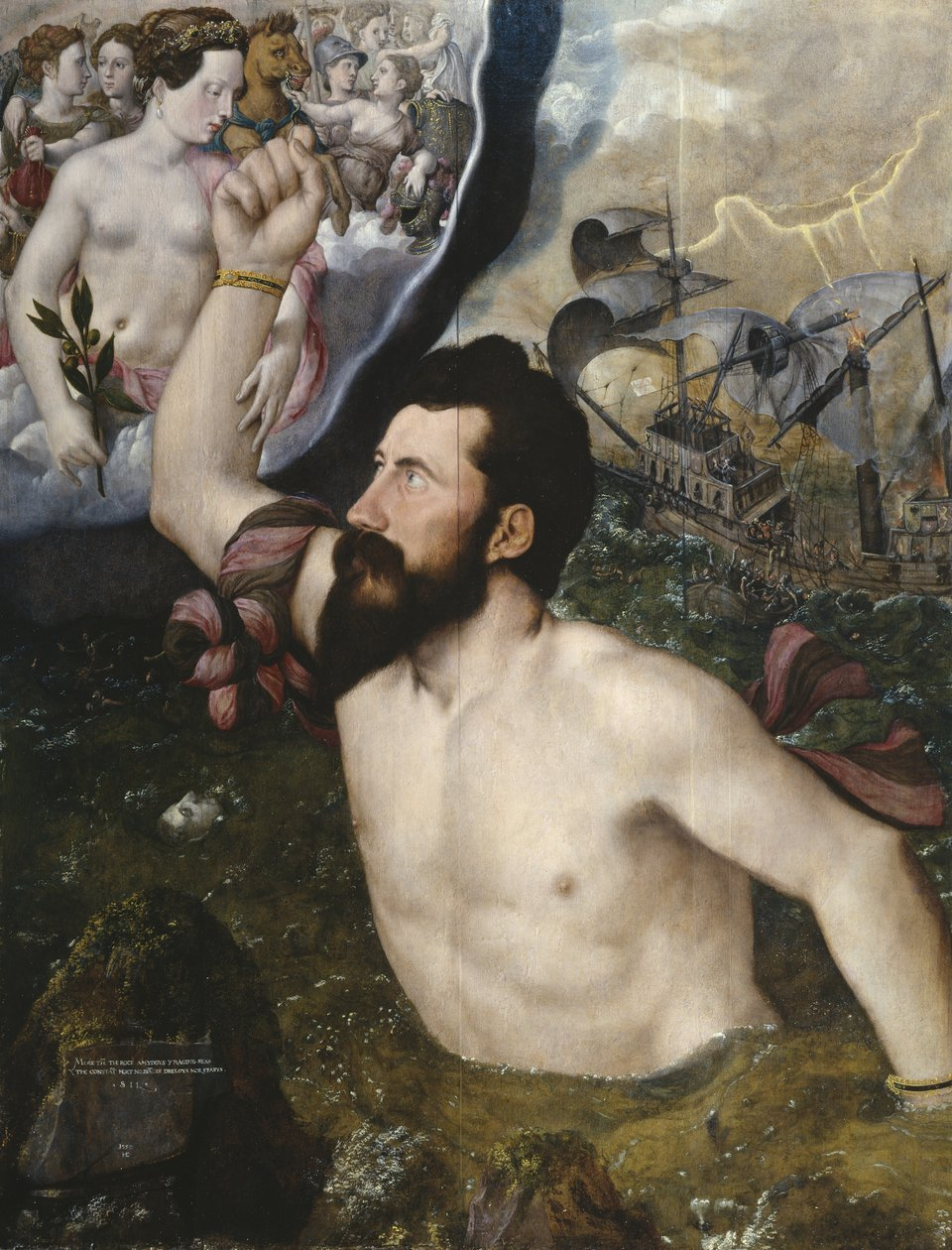
Allegorical portrait of Sir John Luttrell, who held Broughty Castle for the English, by Hans Eworth, 1550

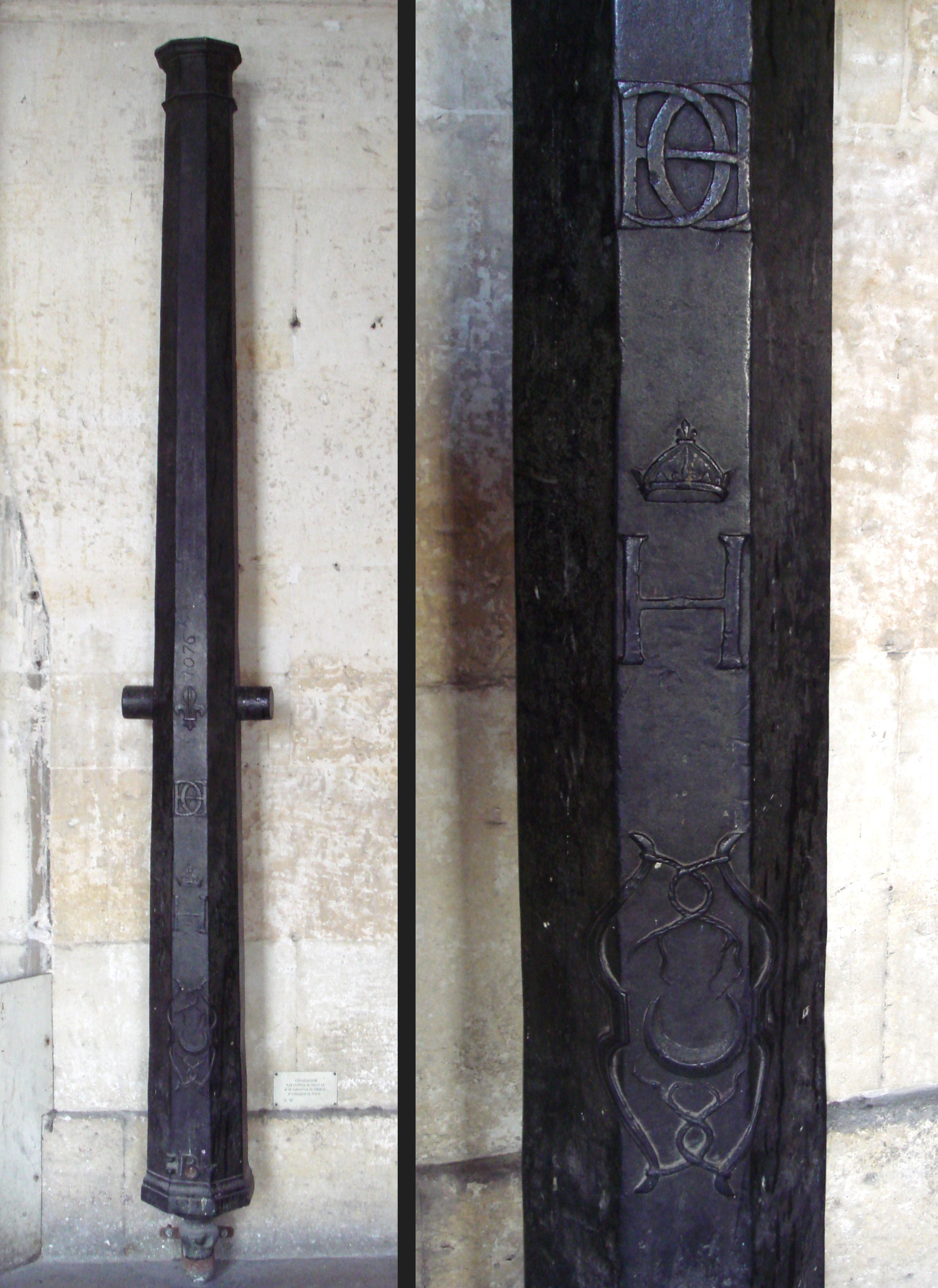
French bâtard culverin of 1548, a type familiar to Lord Methven

On 10 September 1524, Methven was made Principal Master of the Royal Artillery, ("Magnalium nostrorum seu machinarum bellicarum, videlicet: artailzery"), 25 years later he would direct the Scottish artillery at the Siege of Haddington.

During the war of the Rough Wooing, Methven wrote to queen Mary of Guise, the widow of James V, on 31 December 1547 to discuss the use of artillery in the war. He said that Regent Arran had been advised that the modest ("sober") Scottish artillery used at the Siege of St Andrews Castle could have taken the castle, and the later prolonged and expensive siege, after Arran had departed, had harmed public opinion. Similarly, a recent ineffective show of artillery at Broughty Castle had only warned the English to get more support and re-fortify. Now, to take Broughty from the English, more cannon needed to be supplied. Methven asked for French captains with intelligence of the field, and intelligence to assiege and order artillery to the best effect.

The historian Marcus Merriman connected Methven's letter with the employment of an Italian military engineer Migliorino Ubaldini who directed the construction of new fortifications at Edinburgh Castle.

Methven wrote to Mary of Guise again on 3 June 1548 with more strategic advice. He said that he had friends all over Scotland and had been diligent in acquiring intelligence of the motives of those Scots who favoured the English. He found four principal motives; religion, fear, regard for a belief in prophecy, and the ignorant conceit that English justice and rule might be better. He advised her that there were so many dissidents that the unity of Scotland would be best served by offering an act of remission, a general pardon, rather than punishment, as her husband James V had done for rebels during his minority, (on 10 December 1540). Methven thought the defeat at Pinkie, which he called the "jeornay of Penke", was due to these causes, and the unorderly haste of the Scottish army.

He added that he heard it was already widely known in Perth by the end of May that the Scottish artillery at the siege of Broughty Castle would be moved to the Siege of Haddington. The citizens of Perth hoped a French army would come to protect them from Broughty's English garrison. Methven had issued the guns at Broughty to the Earl of Argyll. Methven starting moving the guns on 6 June. As an example to the local lairds who were obliged to do this work, he yoked 240 oxen and began to drag the guns through his and Lord Ruthven's lands. At Haddington, he reported on 5 July; "all nycht all our greit artallzery lawborit and has dong the tolbutht and reft an pece that lay betuix it and the kirk of the Freyris." But on 17 July, the French officer D'Essé ordered the guns to be withdrawn. As English reinforcement approached Methven took the Scottish and French guns to Edinburgh and Leith, and ordered their repair.

== Ancestry ==
Ancestors of Henry Stewart, 1st Lord Methven

16. Walter Stewart (executed 1425)
8. Walter Stewart, Feudal Baron of Morphie
17. Janet Erskine
4. Alexander Stewart
9. Elizabeth Arnot
2. Andrew Stewart, 1st Lord Avondale (second creation)
1. Henry Stewart, 1st Lord Methven
24. Sir James Kennedy of Dunure, the Younger
12. Gilbert Kennedy, 1st Lord Kennedy
25. Mary Stewart
6. John Kennedy, 2nd Lord Kennedy
26. Herbert Maxwell, 1st Lord Maxwell
13. Catherine Maxwell
3. Margaret Kennedy
28. Alexander Seton
14. Alexander Gordon, 1st Earl of Huntly
29. Elizabeth of Gorden
7. Elizabeth Gordon
30. William Crichton of that Ilk, 1st Lord Crichton
15. Elizabeth Crichton

== Sources ==
- Buchanan, Patricia Hill (1985). Margaret Tudor, Queen of Scots. Scottish Academic Press. ISBN 9780707304243.
- HMC 9th report and appendix, Lord Elphinstone (London, 1884), 191.
- Cameron, Annie (1927). The Scottish Correspondence of Mary of Lorraine. Scottish History Society.
