= Alexander Ruthven =

Scottish earl

Alexander Ruthven, master of Ruthven (12 January 1580 – 5 August 1600) was a Scottish nobleman. He is most notable for his participation in the Gowrie conspiracy of 1600.

== Early life ==
Ruthven was born in Perth, the third son of William Ruthven, 1st Earl of Gowrie, and his wife Dorothea Stewart. He was educated at Perth grammar school, and later at the University of Edinburgh.

== Gowrie conspiracy ==
Ruthven was, with his brother John Ruthven, responsible for an attempt to kidnap or murder King James in August 1600. He lured the king to Gowrie House, where he attempted to confine him in a corner turret while his brother distracted members of the king's retinue. According to Adrian Damman and Thomas Hamilton, Alexander Ruthven tried to tie the king's hands with his garter.

However, the king was able to call for help, and both Alexander and John Ruthven were killed by members of the king's party. Alexander was killed by John Ramsay. While opponents of the king were of the belief that James had fabricated the conspiracy to cover his eradication of the Ruthven family, most modern scholarship agrees that the brothers concocted a plot to kidnap the monarch.

== Aftermath ==
Following his death, Alexander was condemned for treason, and hanged and quartered in Edinburgh on 17 November 1600. His head remained exposed in that city, while his arms and legs were taken to Perth.
