= James Stewart, Earl of Arran =

16th-century Scottish noble and politician

Arms of James Stewart

James Stewart, Earl of Arran (died 1595) was created Earl of Arran by the young King James VI, who wrested the title from James Hamilton, 3rd Earl of Arran. He rose to become Lord Chancellor of Scotland and was eventually murdered in 1595.

== Career ==
He was the second son of Andrew Stewart, 2nd Lord Ochiltree, by his wife Agnes, the daughter of John Cunningham, 5th of Capringtoun, Ayrshire. Stewart's sister, Margaret, was married to the reformer John Knox.

In April 1573, James was sent as a "pledge" or hostage to England for the security of the English army and artillery sent to the "Lang Siege" of Edinburgh Castle, which was held by supporters of Mary, Queen of Scots. Regent Morton gave him £55 for his expenses in England. He was Captain of the Royal Guard of James VI, served with the Dutch forces in the Netherlands against the Spanish, and returned to Scotland in 1579.

James quickly became a favourite of the young king, and in 1580 was made Gentleman of the Bedchamber. He was a follower of Esmé Stewart, and in January 1580 he accused the former Regent Morton, still the effective power in Scotland, of participation in the murder of Henry Stuart, Lord Darnley. Stewart was rewarded as Tutor of Arran, with powers over the earldom of the mentally-ill James Hamilton, 3rd Earl of Arran, then made Earl of Arran on 22 April 1581. He also claimed the position of second person in the land through being nearest to the king by descent, other than the now-insane third earl. The new Earl often resided at the Hamilton's Kinneil House until after his own fall in the autumn of 1585, when he remained at Kinneil under house-arrest, and for a time Kinneil was called Arran House.

In July 1581 he married Elizabeth Stewart, the divorced former wife of the King's great-uncle, Robert Stewart, once Earl of Lennox and now Earl of March. Elizabeth, the Countess of Arran, was the daughter of John Stewart, 4th Earl of Atholl.

=== The Lennox-Arran administration ===
Esmé Stewart was made Earl, then Duke, of Lennox, and he and Arran became partners in government, and rivals for the supremacy. Their government of Scotland, and their correspondence with France and Spain, made them unpopular in England and with the "ultra-Protestant" sector at home, although the young King greatly admired Lennox and enjoyed his company. Lennox and Arran disagreed over several issues, including the rehabilitation of Thomas Kerr of Ferniehirst in June 1581.

James VI wrote to Mary on 28 May 1582 that the Earl of Arran and Lennox were as good friends as ever, and they would both work to accomplish the "Association", a plan for Mary to return to Scotland.

=== The Ruthven raid ===
In August 1582 Lennox and Arran held the Privy Council at Perth, and then returned to Dalkeith Palace near Edinburgh. James VI was invited to stay hunting in Perthshire, and he was taken at Huntingtower Castle (then known as "Ruthven Castle") by the Earl of Gowrie and his political faction on 22 August 1582, a kidnap known as the Ruthven Raid. The next day they gave the King their supplication or mandate, which stated;

We have suffered now about the space of two years such false accusations, calumnies, oppressions and persecutions, by the means of the Duke of Lennox and him who is called the Earl of Arran, that the like of their insolencies and enormities were never heretofore born with in Scotland.

Arran went to Huntingtower and was arrested by the raiders. Lennox was sent in exile to France and died. Gowrie ran Scotland for ten months, after issuing an indictment against Lennox and Arran that included the detail that the Countess of Arran was "a vile and impudent woman, over famous for her monstrous doings, not without suspicion of the devilish magical art." Arran was held for a time at Ruthven Castle. He was then permitted to attend some council meetings to bolster support for the new regime.

Arran had obtained a quantity of jewels belonging to James VI, or to his mother, Mary, Queen of Scots. On 28 May 1583 his wife Elizabeth Stewart, returned sets of pearl, ruby, and diamond buttons, to the Master of Gray, who was master of the king's wardrobe. Later, in 1585, they returned more royal jewels, including the "Great H of Scotland".

=== The Arran supremacy ===
Arran assembled a force of 12,000 men and regained power in July 1583, an ascendancy that would last for two years, and the Ruthven Raiders and their followers were banished to Newcastle upon Tyne. Francis Walsingham came as ambassador from England. Arran organised a local character known as "Kate the Witch" to shout insults at Walsingham at the gate of Stirling Castle. James VI intended to give Walsingham a valuable diamond ring as a parting gift, but Arran, who Walsingham had ignored, substituted a ring of crystal.

Gowrie was executed in May 1584. After May 1584, Arran was always recorded first in the lists of those attending the Scottish Privy Council. He became provost of Edinburgh, and lieutenant-general of the royal army. He acted against the Presbyterian wing of the Scottish church, and the banished lords of the Ruthven Raid, who had returned to assault Stirling Castle. The role of his wife in the administration also attracted the censure of Edinburgh Kirk ministers.

Arran and his wife resided at Holyrood Palace, where their lodgings included the "Balling House", a hall for dancing. Arran was made keeper and governor of Edinburgh Castle and in November 1584 he was ordered to survey the state of repair and faults in its fortifications, and prospect for a new well, according to "his experience and judgement in the art militaire." As part of his strategy to maintain good relations with England, Arran sent copies of the king's poetry book, The Essayes of a Prentise in the Divine Art of Poesie, printed in Edinburgh by Thomas Vautrollier and bound in orange vellum, to Cecil and Lord Hunsdon on 28 December 1584.

Arran's rule was undermined in part by the machinations of his own diplomat in London, the young Master of Gray. By February 1585, Elizabeth opened two lines of communication in Scotland, one with Arran and another with the Master.

James VI granted Dirleton Castle to Arran, who entertained the King there for twelve days in May 1585, while there was plague in Edinburgh. The entertainment included a sumptuous banquet and a Robin Hood play.

Arran fell from power after a border incident when the Englishman Francis Russell, son of the second Earl of Bedford, was killed with a "shot from a dag" on 27 July 1585. Arran was accused of involvement by the English ambassador, Edward Wotton and James VI on first hearing the news offered to send Arran as a prisoner to England. Instead, Arran was imprisoned at St Andrews Castle and then placed in house arrest at his own Kinneil House. One account says he went from Kinneil to Ayr and embarked on a boat with the royal jewels including the Great H of Scotland or 'Kingis Eitche', but was forced to give the jewels to George Home.

Due the plague in Edinburgh and other towns in Scotland, Arran was unable to prevent the Banished Lords of the Ruthven Raid returning from England, seizing Stirling Castle on 4 November 1585, and declaring him a traitor at Stirling's market place. Before they came to the castle, Arran had slipped away over the bridge.

== Retirement and death ==
Avoiding plans for his banishment, and despite being ordered to leave the country, he spent the rest of his life in retirement in Ayrshire. He did however remain in communication with James, and may have carried out some secret missions for him.

In December 1592 Stewart came to Holyroodhouse and met the king by the kennels. He then entered the presence chamber where some called him 'Lord Chancellor' and then met Anne of Denmark and kissed her hand. However, James let it be proclaimed in churches that he would not employ Stewart again. The English ambassador Robert Bowes heard that his supporters included the Duke of Lennox, Sir George Home, James Sandilands, Colonel William Stewart, Thomas Erskine, and the Laird of Dunipace, who plotted his rehabilitation and the wreck and overthrow of the Chancellor John Maitland and the Hamilton family.

He was murdered by Sir James Douglas of Parkhead, nephew of Regent Morton, on 5 December 1595.

Legal offices
Preceded by Colin Campbell	Lord Chancellor of Scotland; 1584–1586	Succeeded by John Maitland
