= Garthland Castle =

Coordinates: 54.8565°N 4.9968°W

Garthland Castle was a castle that was located near Garthland Mains, Dumfries and Galloway, Scotland.

The castle was possibly built in 1211, as a datestone bearing that date has been discovered within the Garthland Mains estate. It would appear that further extensions in 1274 were undertaken, as another datestone has been reused within the Garthland Mains estate. The castle was seat of the family of M'Dowall of Garthland.
