= John Stewart, 2nd Earl of Atholl =

Scottish peer and soldier

John Stewart
- Arms of Stewart, Earls of Atholl
- Born: c. 1480
- Died: c. 1521 (aged c. 41)
- Allegiance: England
- Conflicts: War of the League of Cambrai Battle of Flodden
- Children: John, Janet, and 5 other daughters

John Stewart, 2nd Earl of Atholl (c. 1480 – c. 1521) was the second Earl of Atholl. He fought in the Battle of Flodden on 9 September 1513.

== Biography ==
He was born after 1475 to John Stewart, 1st Earl of Atholl and Eleanor Sinclair. He married Lady Janet Campbell, daughter of Archibald Campbell, 2nd Earl of Argyll, by Elizabeth Stewart. He succeeded to the title of 2nd Earl of Atholl on 15 September 1512 at the death of his father. He fought in the Battle of Flodden on 9 September 1513. He was living in 1520, and died before 1522. His widow, Janet, died around Candlemas 1545–46.

Children:

- John Stewart, 3rd Earl of Atholl (1507–1542).
- Lady Janet Stewart married (1st) Alexander Gordon, Master of Sutherland; (2nd) Hugh Kennedy of Girvanmains; (3rd) Henry Stewart, 1st Lord Methven; and (4th) Patrick Ruthven, 3rd Lord Ruthven.
- Lady Helen Stewart, married (1st) John Lindsay, 5th Lord Lindsay of the Byres; (2nd) Thomas Moncur.
- Lady Elizabeth Stewart, stated to have married Kenneth Mackenzie, 10th of Kintail.
- Lady Jean Stewart (died 19 April 1522), married James Arbuthnot, 13th of Arbuthnott.
- Lady Isabel Stewart, married James Herine or Herring of Lethendy.
- Margaret Stewart, who married Colin Campbell, 3rd of Glenorchy, and her son was "Grey Colin", Laird of Glenorchy.

== Footnotes ==
Peerage of Scotland
Preceded by John Stewart	Earl of Atholl; 1512–1519	Succeeded by John Stewart
