= Jean Stewart, Lady Bargany =

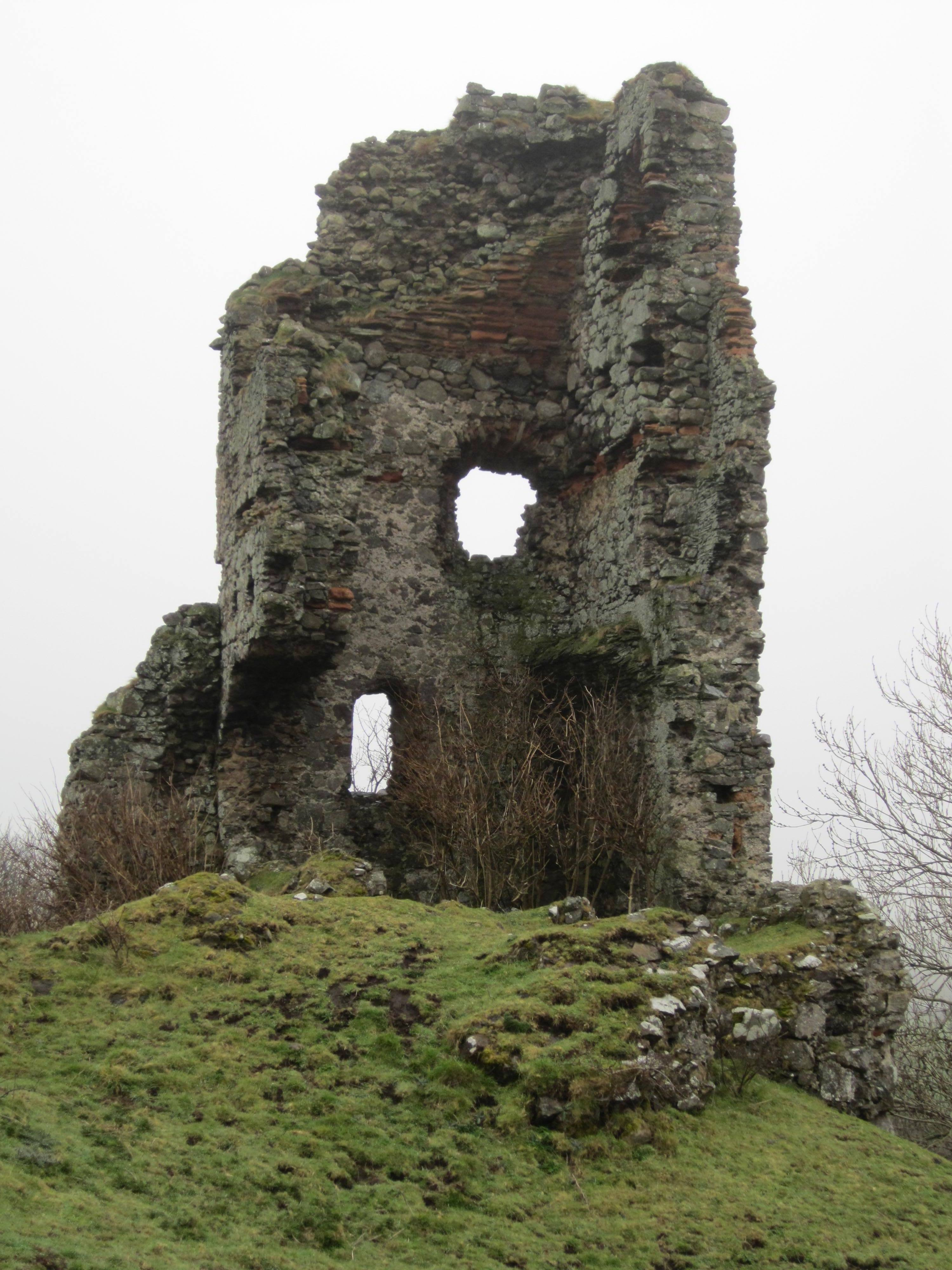
Ardstinchar Castle

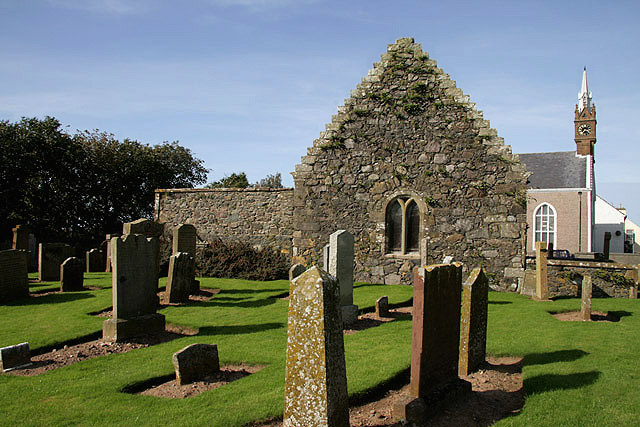
Jean Stewart was buried at Ballantrae

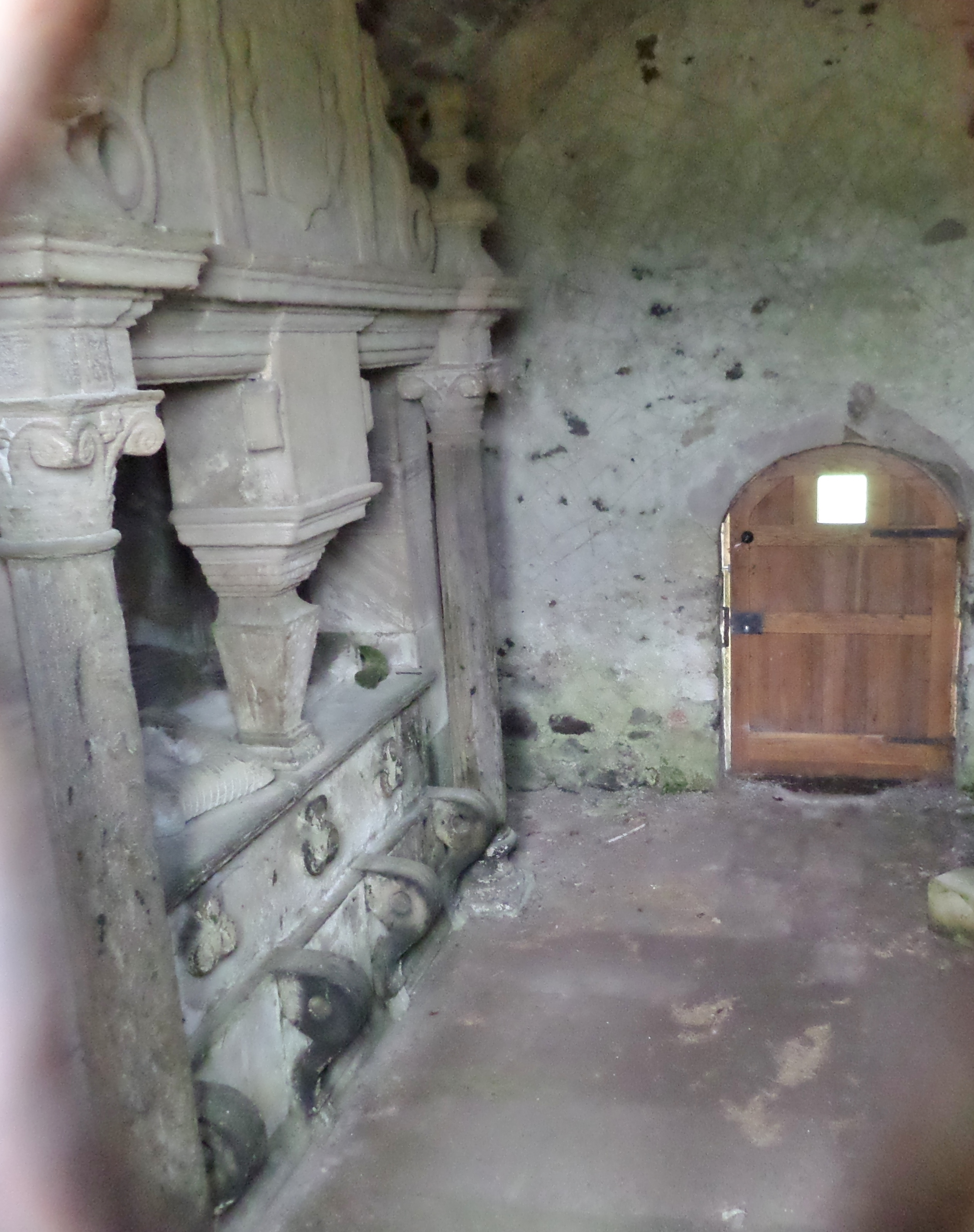
The Kennedy Aisle at Ballantrae

Jean Stewart, Lady Bargany (c.1577 – 1605) was a Scottish lady in waiting to Anne of Denmark. She was a younger daughter of Andrew, Master of Ochiltree and Margaret Stewart, Mistress of Ochiltree. Jean was a maiden in the household of Anne of Denmark and her mother was the senior lady in waiting. Her marriage is of special interest to historians.

== Marriage ==
Jean Stewart married Gilbert Kennedy of Bargany and Ardstinchar, the third son of Thomas Kennedy of Bargany and Agnes Montgomerie daughter of Hugh Montgomerie, 2nd Earl of Eglinton. Bargany Castle, demolished in the seventeenth century, was on the south side of the Water of Girvan in Dailly parish in Ayrshire.

Two chronicles, possibly by the same author, state that James VI of Scotland arranged this marriage for Kennedy to a bride without a dowry to punish the family because Thomas Kennedy laird of Bargany had taken part in a riot in Edinburgh on 17 December 1596.

The older laird of Bargany had appeared with others in the Tolbooth of Edinburgh and made a religious protest. James VI was in the Tolbooth of Edinburgh with most of the Privy Council and the Octavians. After a sermon given by Walter Balcanquhall in St Giles, the congregation came out crying "the sword of Gideon" and some called for arms. The royal guard escorted James VI back to Holyroodhouse. The incident came to be regarded as a conflict between the gentlemen of the king's household known as 'cubiculars' and the financial officers called the 'Octavians' who were unpopular with some, and thought to be led by Roman Catholic interests. As the two chronicles mention, after this disturbance Lord Lindsay of the Byres' property was forfeit, and the old Laird Bargany was punished by a marriage for his son Gilbert that was to "the wreck of his house".

== A dowry for Jean Stewart ==
Some details known about the marriage contract and settlement appears to contradict the story found in the chronicles. James VI bought clothes for Jean Stewart and paid for food and musicians at the wedding in Edinburgh in 1597. Anne of Denmark first tried to obtain Lord Lindsay's forfeit as a dowry for her favourite, Jean Stewart. Then she arranged a loan for the dowry, asking Sir William Stewart of Traquair, Jean Stewart's brother-in-law, to be a guarantor. He had protected the king on the day of the riot, and became a cautioner for the money. Years later, in 1615 the loan for dowry or "tochter" money was still not paid, and their son claimed the sum from John Stewart of Traquair and his legal tutor Robert Stuart. It was noted that Jean Stewart had been a "gentlewoman married out of the queen's company". In April 1615 the Privy Council of Scotland wrote to King James that Traquair ought not to be liable because Sir William had been following the queen's direction "whose commandment was ever unto him a law". The Privy Council noted that the king and queen were also cautioners for the loan and "personallie bound in the contract". In May, Anne of Denmark asked her lady-in-waiting Jean Ker, Countess of Roxburghe to write to her husband to intercede with King James to the same effect, to pay what Traquair owed for the dowry.

== The Jean Stewart sonnet ==
Among sonnets possibly by the poet William Fowler in the Hawthornden manuscripts held by the National Library of Scotland, one is dedicated to a "Jean Stewart". The subject of the poem, identified by an anagram "A trustie ane" for "Jean Stuart", is a woman blessed with a "dowry deck'd". This poem may refer to Jean Stewart, Lady Bargany. Literary historians Helena Mennie Shire and Sebastiaan Verweij have suggested another lady was the subject, "Jean Stewart", Jean Campbell, who was a great-granddaughter of King James IV of Scotland, and the second wife of the Duke of Lennox. The sonnet is given here below with a suggested modernised version by Jamie Reid-Baxter:

Lyke as the heavens with dowries hathe you dect
Aboue the com̄on course of humaine race,
As nature hath you clad in eche respect
With bewtye, bounty, witt, & comly grace,
As all the Gods ther vertues in you place,
What heaven what earth or man may you devyse,
As loue himself is painted in your face
To hurt & heale with Archers of your eyes,
As chastety close hidden in you lyes,
As al your graces euerye man dothe muse,
As you to serue eche one ther spreit applyes,
So wish I you (A trustie ane) to chuse:
And, mistris myne, if ye my truthe will trye,
Ye shall not fynde a trustier then I.

(modernised)
Just as the heavens have bedecked you with dowries
Surpassing the general experience of humankind,
And nature has clothed you in every way
With beauty, generosity, wit and lovely gracefulness,
And all the gods have placed their virtues in you,
- Whatever heaven, earth or man can devise for you –
And love himself is painted in your face,
To hurt and heal with the arrows shot from your eyes,
And chastity lies deep and hidden in you,
And every man wonders at all your graces
And each one devotes his spirit to serving you -
So by the same token, I wish you to choose 'A trusty one':
And mistress mine, if you will try my troth,
You will not find anyone trustier than I am.

== Kennedy feud ==
Thomas Kennedy of Bargany died on 7 November 1597 and Gilbert Kennedy became the laird of Bargany and Ardstinchar. James VI settled the barony of Bargany on Thomas Kennedy and Jean Stewart on 12 August 1597. Jean Stewart continued to be known as "Lady Bargany". They had a son Thomas and two daughters who died young.

Gilbert Kennedy of Bargany was drawn into the long-standing family feud with John Kennedy, 5th Earl of Cassillis. On 3 January 1598, Thomas Kennedy of Culzean, called the Tutor of Cassillis, shot pistols at Bargany's servants Alexander Kennedy and David Mure and others at Maybole and pursuing them the next day at the Place of Auchendrane. The Tutor claimed that Alexander Kennedy had been insinuated into his household, and he had been ambushed in Maybole.

Although Bargany had helped the earl at Inch Castle, on 11 December 1601 he met the earl and his followers at Pennyglen near Maybole and was killed with a lance thrust in his back. The Earl claimed in his defence to the Privy Council that Bargany's party that day included men who had been denounced by the king as rebels. The Earl had a commission to pursue these rebels with fire and sword. The lawyer Thomas Hamilton challenged this defence, but Cassilis and his followers (all named) were found not guilty.

Jean Stewart Lady Bargany was required to deliver her houses of Ardstinchar, Bargany, Newark, and her house in Ayr to the king's herald in 1603. She continued the feud by legal means, but also received several royal gifts by privy seal letter.

== Death ==
Jean Stewart fell ill from some sort of fever and went to see the queen's physician Martin Schöner at court in London, but he gave her no hope and she died at Stilton in Cambridgeshire on her way back to Scotland on 16 August 1605. The chronicle said she died of "eittik" or "hectic", meaning pulmonary consumption.

== Burial at Ballantrae ==
Jean Stewart was buried with her husband in the new burial aisle she had built at Ballantrae close to Ardstinchar Castle. The monument has been discussed in connection with the architecture of Anne of Denmark and David Cunningham of Robertland. It has been suggested the monument may be the work of the master mason David Scoughall.

== The will of Lady Bargany ==
The will of Jean Stewart gives an insight the clothes worn by a Scottish courtier, some of which were gifts from the queen, with the furnishings she owned at Ardstinchar and Bargany, and her farmstock including the four English milk cows at Bargany, her coach horses and six nags.

Among the silverware there was a little silver gilt mazer or quaich. Personal jewelry included three gold chains; three pairs of gold bracelets; a gold belt; two gold hangers of brooches; two small jewels set with diamonds and rubies; two pairs of gold garnishings (back and fore, to wear in her hair); eight knops and finger rings; and a pearl embroidered "shadow". A shadow was the name of a kind of riding veil.

Her wardrobe included six gowns with their doublets, skirts, and vasquines, each valued at £76-13s-4d. Scots; five cloaks of silk, velvet grosgam, and taffeta at £40 each; a gown of green figured velvet; four "stands" of velvet clothes that had belonged to Gilbert Kennedy, and more cloaks.

There were bed curtains of red, blue, and yellow taffeta; a scarlet embroidered "pinnacle" (a bed canopy), black figured taffeta bed curtains, red and white embroidered curtains with a red velvet "pinnacle", green damask bed curtains, gray, blue, green curtains and a scarlet canopy, red stemming, red grosgrain, and six stands of tartan curtains. Other household goods listed included "buirdclaith" (tablecloths) of dornick and damask linen, pots, pans, spits and racks.

There were two "hagbuts" or muskets and six small "iron pieces" or pistols. The executor of the will was Josias Stewart of Bonytoun, sometime friend of the rebel Hercules Stewart.

== Thomas Kennedy of Bargany and Margaret Stewart ==
Their son, Thomas Kennedy of Bargany married his cousin Margaret Stewart, the daughter of Jean Stewart, and Lady Bargany's brother Josias Stewart of Bonytoun, who had been the executor of Jean's will and Thomas' legal tutor. Margaret Stewart left him in 1619, complaining of his lack of respect to her and her father. On 6 October 1619 after her usual morning prayers at Bargany Castle, she was walking in the garden with her psalm book in her hands, and was surprised by her husband's servant Patrick Kennedy, who asked where she had been. Patrick complained to Thomas about her answer and said she called him "his tutor". This enraged Thomas who found her in the gardener's house and he punched and kicked her. Although the gardener Thomas Todie intervened as she tried to escape Thomas caught up with her again and dragged her by the hair back towards Bargany House (the distance of three archery butts), and up a narrow stair to the gallery, banging her head against the sides. Thomas left her unconscious on the gallery floor and locked her alone in the castle. Margaret found her way out of the back door and escaped through the hedge and waded through the deep water of the Girvan, hiding in the woods and reaching the safety of her aunt's house at Dailly the next day. Then she rode to Ardstinchar Castle hoping to find her father but had to stay in a barn until Lord Ochiltree arrived. She came to Edinburgh where her father and John Jolie, doctor of physic looked after her. Meanwhile, in November Thomas was at Ballintrae and played golf on the links called the Green of Ardstinchar with his friends. The Privy Council of Scotland upheld her complaint.
