= Robert Jameson (shipowner) =

Scottish shipowner

Robert Jameson (died 1608) was a Scottish shipowner from Ayr.

Jameson was a burgess of Ayr, and owner of ships including the James Royall. He is described as Master of his ships, and also as "Captain Robert Jameson". His brother George (d. 1603) was also a burgess of Ayr.

== Career ==
In August 1584 James VI gave Jameson a ship called the Pheasant which had been confiscated from William Gytonis for piracy on the West Seas.

In 1585 the former royal favourite James Stewart, Earl of Arran embarked on Robert Jameson's boat carrying royal jewellery including 'Kingis Eitche', the Great H of Scotland, but he was forced to give his treasure up to William Stewart of Caverston, Governor of Dumbarton Castle, aboard ship in the coastal water known as the Fairlie Road.

In 1588 James VI of Scotland hired a ship from Ayr, which may have belonged to Robert Jameson, to be fitted out for Sir William Stewart of Carstairs to pursue the rebel Lord Maxwell with 120 musketeers or "hagbutters".

On 22 October 1589 James VI decided to sail to Norway to meet his bride Anne of Denmark, after receiving her letters sent from Flekkerøy in Norway. His courtiers, led by the Chancellor of Scotland John Maitland of Thirlestane equipped a fleet of six ships.

Patrick Vans of Barnbarroch hired the Falcon of Leith from John Gibson, described as a little ship. Maitland's accounts of the English subsidy money detail the preparation of the James Royall, apparently of 126 tons, again hired from Jameson. The James was now equipped with cannon by the Comptroller of Ordinance John Chisholm for the use of the royal gunner James Rocknow. The guns were probably intended for firing salutes. The sails of the James were decorated with red taffeta.

An order, brought from the king by William Schaw, was made on 13 March 1590 for several towns including Ayr to equip "six ships of the greatest berth" to bring James VI and Anna of Denmark from Denmark. These ships would have "streamers of war of red taffeta". As a substitute for a ship at Ayr, Colonel William Stewart would hire a ship available on the east coast. Edinburgh town council hired the Angel of Kirkcaldy from David Hucheson, and the ship was painted by James Workman.

Jameson complained to the Privy Council in June 1590 that he worried he would not be paid for the charter of the James, because of changes in the gathering and administration of a tax raised to fund the king's voyage. The council ordered that Jameson should be paid.

The payment for the hire of the ship in Maitland's account is for two months in the king's "passing and returning", which suggests that the James Royall, presumably with Jameson as Captain, sailed with the king, returned from Norway in November 1590, and made the voyage again in April. One ship returned from Flekkerøy shortly before James met Anna at Oslo, bringing home some people who were no longer required. There had been an accident when its gunner fired a fully loaded cannon as a salute for Steen Bille, injuring a boy.

In January 1593 Mr George Kerr, brother of Mark Kerr of Newbattle, gave 236 gold crowns to John Campbell, a servant of Robert Jameson. The Privy Council asked Jameson to pay the money to the courtier James Sandilands of Slamannan.

In August 1598 James VI and the council again chose Robert Jameson's ship to carry the king to Kintyre. Robert was instructed to hire sailors in Ayr and borrow suitable weapons and cannon in the town. This expedition was cancelled. It was thought King James had planned to dispossess the landholders and install a colony of settlers from Fife.

In 1607 two of his children, John and Margaret, were declared legitimate by royal charter.

When Captain Robert Jameson died in January 1608 the James was at Ayr, unrigged and stripped of its furniture.
