= Kennedy Aisle =

Church in South Ayrshire, Scotland

- Ballantrae, South Ayrshire, Scotland; UK grid reference NX 08379 82444
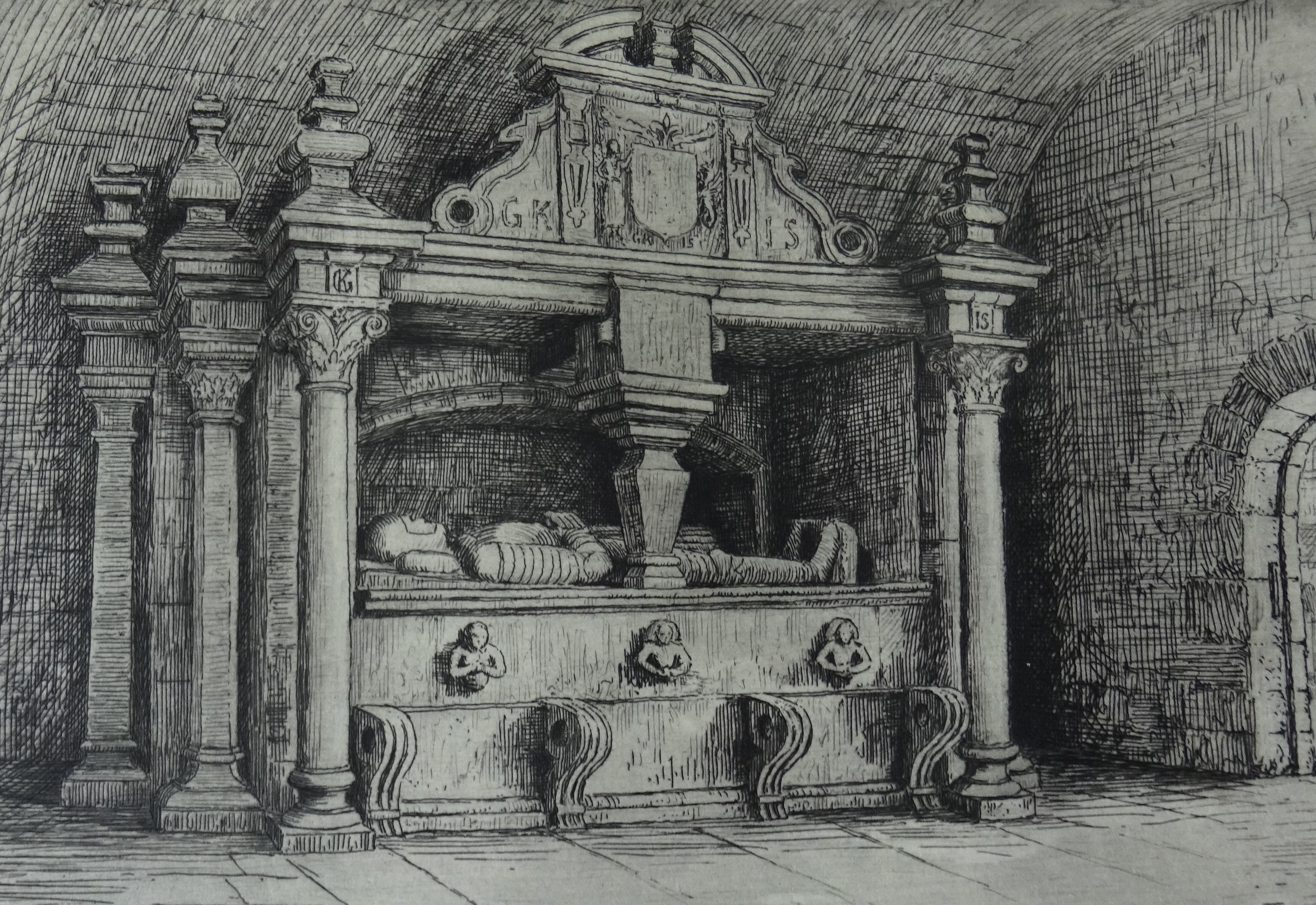
- The Kennedy Monument in the aisle

Site information
- Type: A Burial Aisle and crypt
- Owner: Clan Kennedy
- Open to the public: By arrangement
- Condition: Maintained

Location
- Kennedy Aisle
- Location within Scotland
- Coordinates: 55.099287°N 5.0048943°W

Site history
- Built: 17th century
- Built by: Janet Kennedy, Lady Bargany
- In use: 17th to 20th centuries
- Materials: Ashlar masonry

The Kennedy Aisle or Bargany Aisle at (NX 08379 82444) Ballantrae, South Ayrshire is a vaulted burial chamber and crypt containing a large mural memorial, the Kennedy Monument, an ornately carved stone monument dated to between 1602 and 1605 that commemorates Gilbert Kennedy of Bargany and Ardstinchar, his wife, Janet or Jean Stewart, who died in 1605 and three of their children.

The mural monument architecturally has much in common with the 1600 Glencairn Monument commissioned by James, Seventh Earl of Glencairn for himself, his Countess, Margaret and their eight children. A burial crypt was present in front of the monument.

== The old parish kirk ==
The aisle was erected as a mausoleum containing a memorial to Gilbert Kennedy, Baron of Bargany and Ardstinchar, circa 1604. It became a part of the new kirk that became the parish kirk in 1617, replacing St Cuthbert's Kirk on the lands of Kirkholm at Kirkcubright-Innertig. A new manse was built at the same time and a glebe provided. It was described as ".. the new Kirk of Ballantry; quhilk the lady had caussitt build for hir husband, quhair scho had gartt sett wp ane glorieous towme".

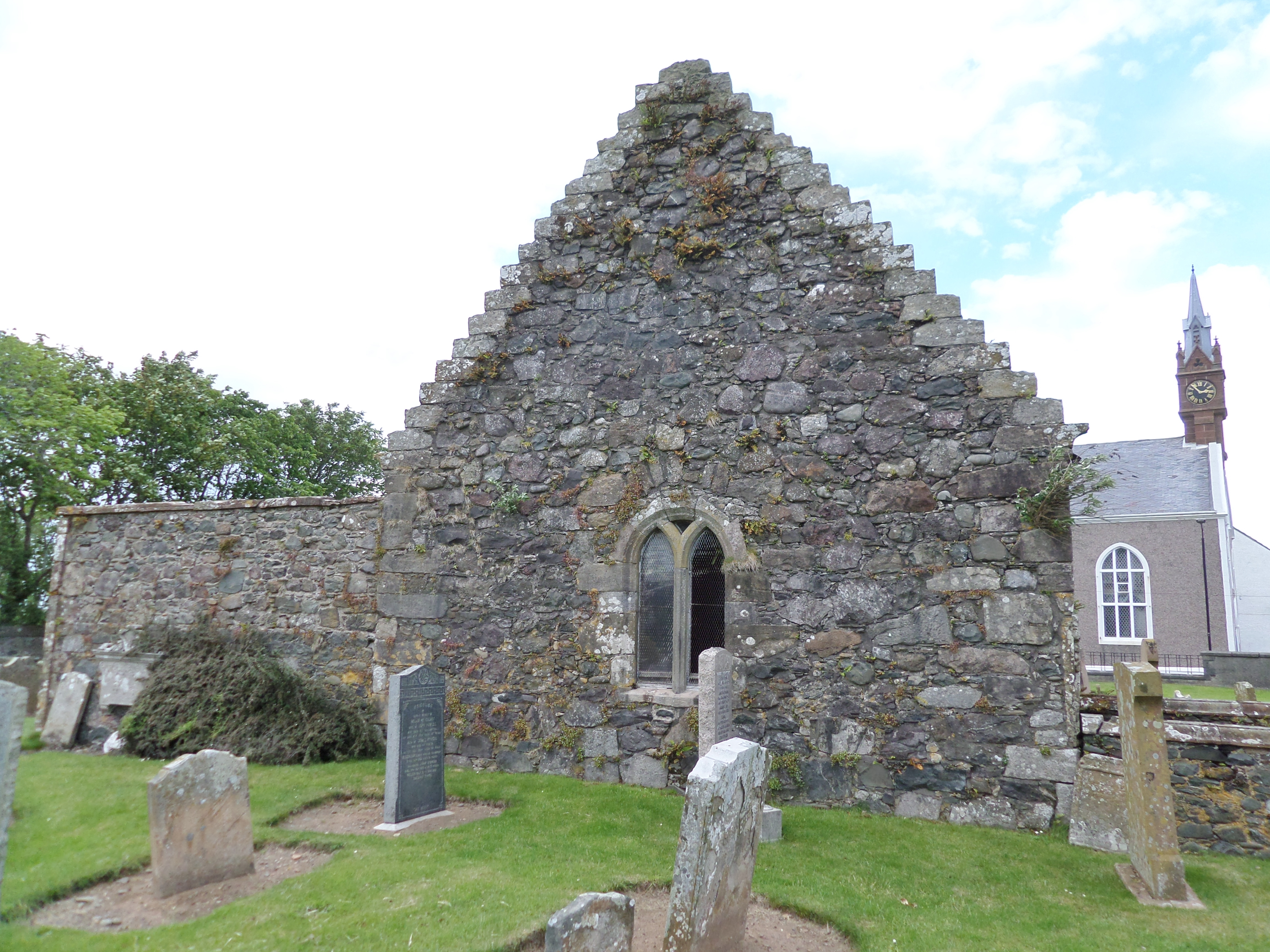
The Kennedy Aisle and what may be a section of the old kirk wall seen from the North.

As stated, in 1617 the move of the Parish kirk to Ballantrae was confirmed by Parliament ".. that off lait Laird off Barganie, vpoun ane verre religious and gryit zeale and affectioun, vpoun his lairge ans sumpteous chairgie and expense has caused builde and edefie ane kirk within the toun of Ballantrae, now erected in ane burgh of baronie, ...".

In 1650 Ballantrae Kirk was disjoined from Colmonell Parish and it became part of the Presbytery of Ayr in 1699. A new manse was built in 1736 that required repair work in 1777.

The old kirk was abandoned and probably robbed to provide building stone for the new parish church built nearby in 1819. In 1827 it was decided that the site of the old kirk should be cleared for use as a burial ground. Of the original parish kirk only one wall may survive with a trace of an infilled pointed arch window.

In 1855 a roofed building stood attached to the east gable end of the David Ferguson Kennedy of Finarts Aisle, unroofed by 1894, the ruins of which survive.

The patronage of the kirk had been held by Crossraguel Abbey, passed to the Kennedys of Bargany and then to Sir John Hamilton of Lesterrick when the Bargany estates were sold.

== Gilbert Kennedy of Bargany and Ardstinchar ==
Gilbert, 16th Laird or Baron of Bargany and Ardstinchar, was killed in 1601 aged 25 at the so-called 'Battle of Brockloch' or the 'Maybole Snowballing'. He was ambushed at Pennyglen, Lady Corse, near Maybole with only thirty or so attendants in a snowstorm by around 200 men led by John Kennedy, 5th Earl of Cassillis. He was struck in the back by a thrown lance and died soon after at Ayr. The details of the incident differ between sources. In revenge for his brother's death, Thomas Kennedy of Drummurchie killed Sir Thomas Kennedy of Culzean near Ayr on the 12th May 1602. Thomas fled to Ireland, where he lived with the Viscount of Ardes.

Gilbert's body was at first interred in a leaden coffin in St John's, the old Kirk of Ayr, until the tomb at Ballantrae was ready for his burial in his own lands.

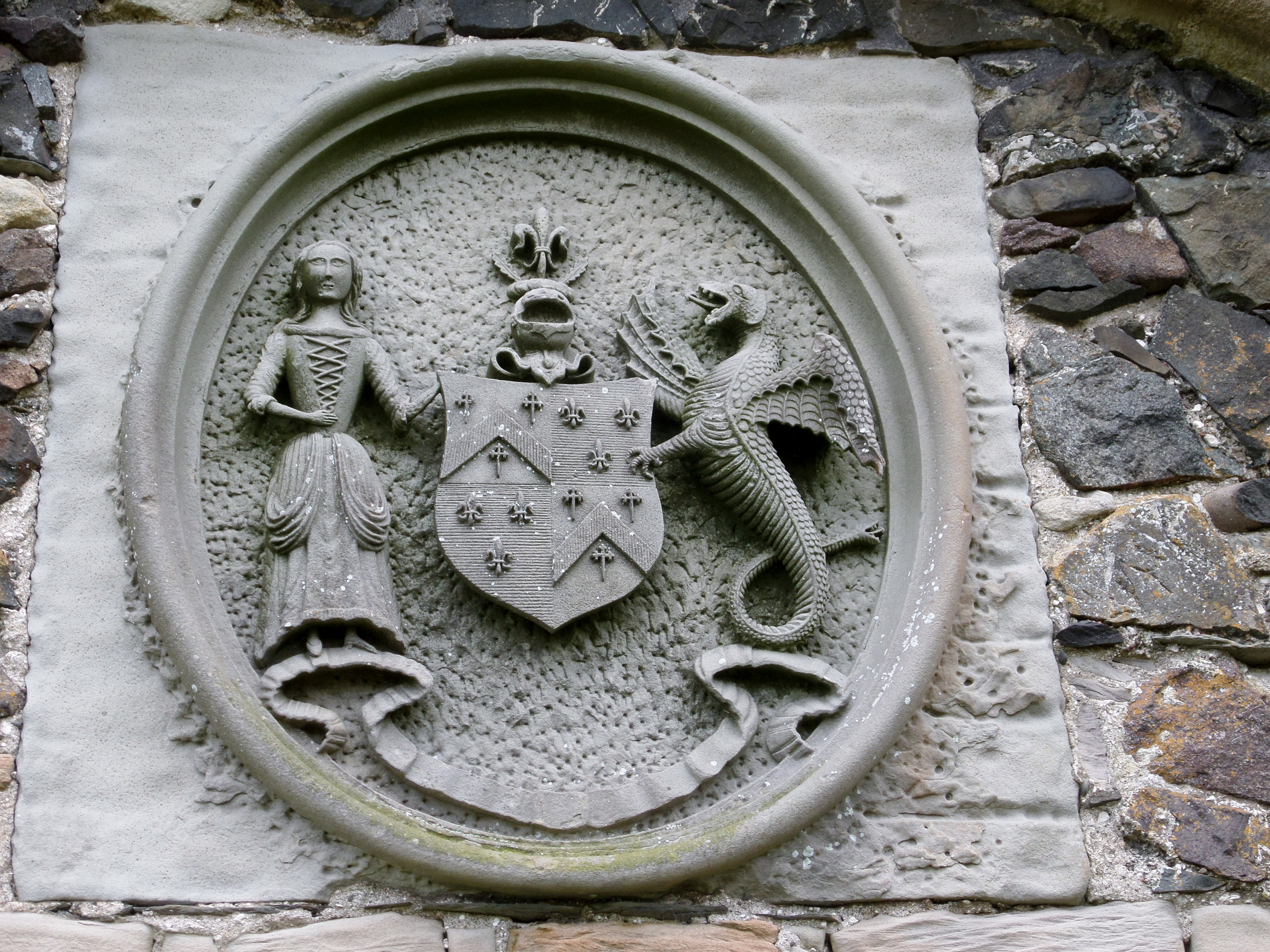
Kennedy of Bargany and Ardstinchar Coat of Arm with supporters.

Gilbert was described by one source in the following terms "He wes the brawest manne that wes to be gottin in ony land; of hiche statour, and weill maid; his hair blak, but of ane comlie feace, the brawest horsmainne, ane the ae best of mony at all pastymis, for he was feirce and feirry, and wonder nimbill. He was bot about the aige of 25 yeair quhane he was slayne, bot of his aige the maist wyise he might be, for gif he had tyme to add experience to his witt, he hed been by his marrowis."

== Janet or Jean Stewart, Lady Bargany ==
Gilbert married Janet Stewart, Lady Bargany in 1597. She was a sister of Lord Ochiltree and a younger daughter of Andrew, Master of Ochiltree and his wife, Margaret Stewart, Mistress of Ochiltree. Janet and her sisters were maidens or ladies in waiting in the household of Queen Anne of Denmark, wife of James VI of Scotland. Janet's mother was the senior lady in waiting. The couple had a son, Thomas, Master of Bargany and Ardstinchar and two daughters who died young.

Janet died of a fever, possibly tuberculosis, on 16 August 1605 at Stilton, after consulting the queen's physician Martin Schöner in London about her consumption. Her body was brought to lie next to her husband at St John's, the old Kirk of Ayr prior to their joint funeral on 15 December 1605. The funeral was attended by many of the nobility such as the Earls of Eglinton, Abercorn, and Winton.

=== The funeral ===
Taking place on 15 September 1605, "... the procession which accompanied the remains from Ayr to Ballantrae numbered one thousand gentlemen on horseback. including three Earls and many Lords and Barons. A nephew of the slain Ardstinchar bore the banner of revenge; on which was painted a picture of the Laird and the motto 'Judge and revenge my cause, O Lord'. A vast concourse of people attended the funeral ceremonies at Ballantrae" with a thousand gentlemen on horseback.

== The Kennedy Aisle ==
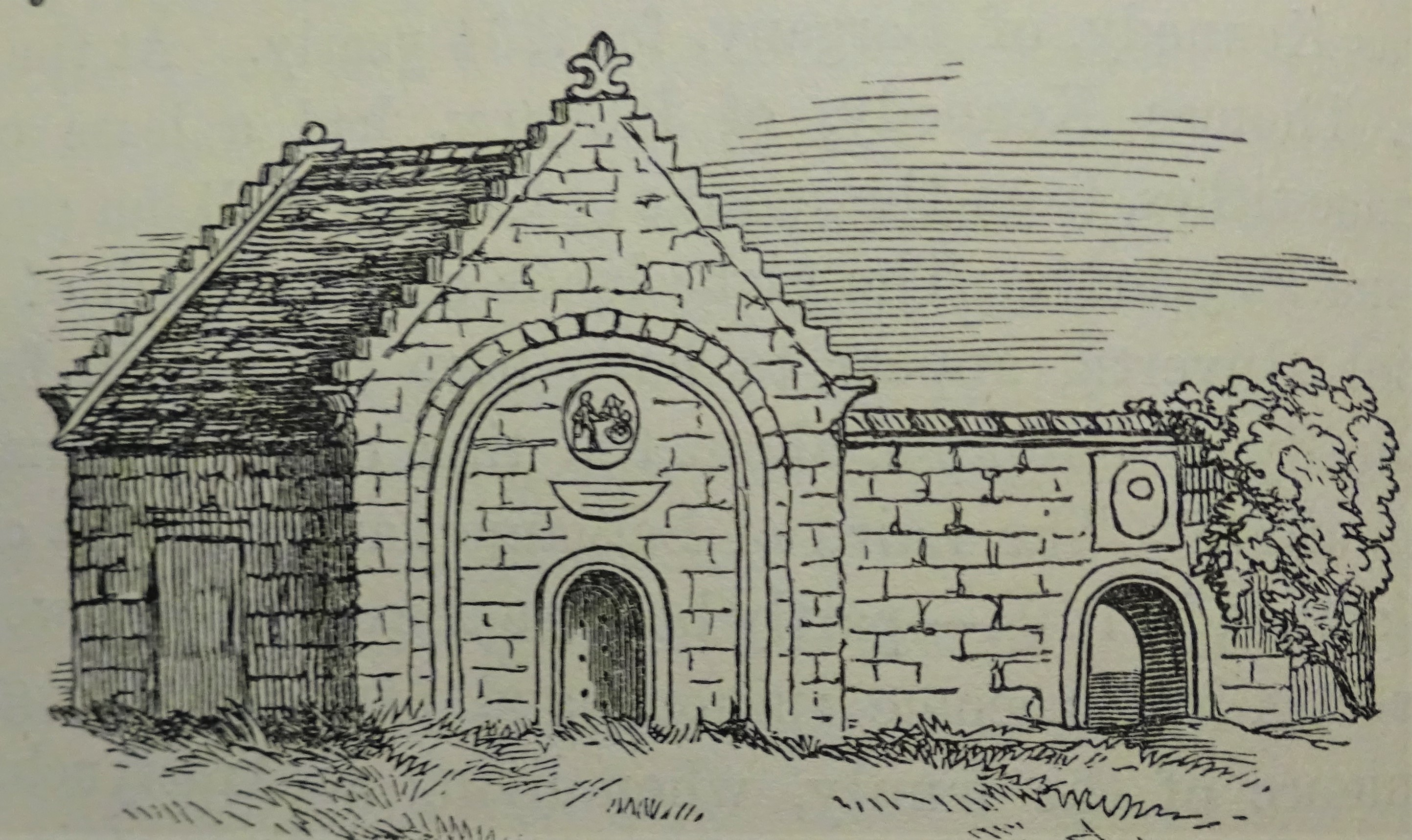
The Kennedy & Ferguson Kennedy of Finnarts Aisles in the 1860s. Note the blocked up door.

A Category A Listed Building, the circa 1602 aisle stood against the south wall of the old kirk, forming a transept aisle lying off the nave of the kirk. The original arch leading into the nave of the old church was partly filled with rubble stonework with a new wooden door constructed in the centre. The stone vaulted ceiling and walls of the aisle show the remnants of an overall plaster finish.

As stated, the kirk had become the parish kirk of Ballantrae in 1617 and after over two hundred years of use, in 1819, most of the building, except for the aisle, was demolished to make way for a burial ground.

The entry in the Ordnance Survey Book for 1855–1857 regarding the aisle states "It is all that remains of that building, & was a few years ago level with the Surface, when Captain Kennedy, Finnart got it rebuilt."

In 1889 the old kirk's aisle was still in use as the "..resting place of the descendants of the ancient family of the Kennedies of Bargany". Two Kennedy family memorial plaques are present, one on each side of the entrance door to the kirk.

The 1806 mausoleum or aisle of David Ferguson Kennedy of Finarts is attached to the west facing side of the aisle and may incorporate part of a wall with a blocked up window that belonged to the old kirk's nave. The so called 'Fishermen's Loft' was built over it to create more space for the then expanding congregation. The gable ends of the aisle have crow steps and the north facing gable is topped by a fleur-de-lis finial reflecting that incorporated into the Kennedy family's coat of arms. The stone paved floor of the aisle has a section of large rectangular slabs that give access to the burial crypt below.

A finely carved coat of arms of the Kennedys of Bargany and Ardstinchar is displayed above the entrance door. They are Quarterly, 1st and 4th, argent. a chev. gules between three cross crosslets fitchée ea., for Kennedy; 2nd and 3rd, azure three fleurs-de-lis or, the arms of France. The supporters are Joan of Arc due to Hugh Kennedy's link with her from the Hundred Years' War and a Wyvern. The arms of France were granted by Charles VII for services rendered.

In addition to the door set in the old arch a side door existed that ran through the east wall and a window was also present next to it, blocked up and with a vertical gravestone set into it on the exterior wall, carrying a heavily worn image of three women standing side by side.

The inscription above the door reads "This aisle contains the burying place of the family of Bargany and Ardstinchar, Chief of the name of Kennedy; and a monument raised over the remains of Gilbert, the sixteenth baron, who was slain in a feudal conflict with his cousin, the Earl of Cassillis, at Maybole in 1601, at the early age of twenty-five; at which conflict, when overpowered by numbers, Bargany displayed the most consummate bravery. The epitaph having been defaced, the representative of the family, Hew F. Kennedy, now of Bennane, mindful of their virtues, has considered it his duty to erect this tablet to the memory of his ancestors".

The 1814 enclosed grave of Rev Donald Williamson is built against the east wall of the aisle with the memorial plaque attached to the wall and another worn plaque to the left.

By 1956 the aisle was in a poor state of repair with the inscriptions and the fine carving details lost through vandalism and decay.

== The Kennedy or Bargany Mural Monument ==
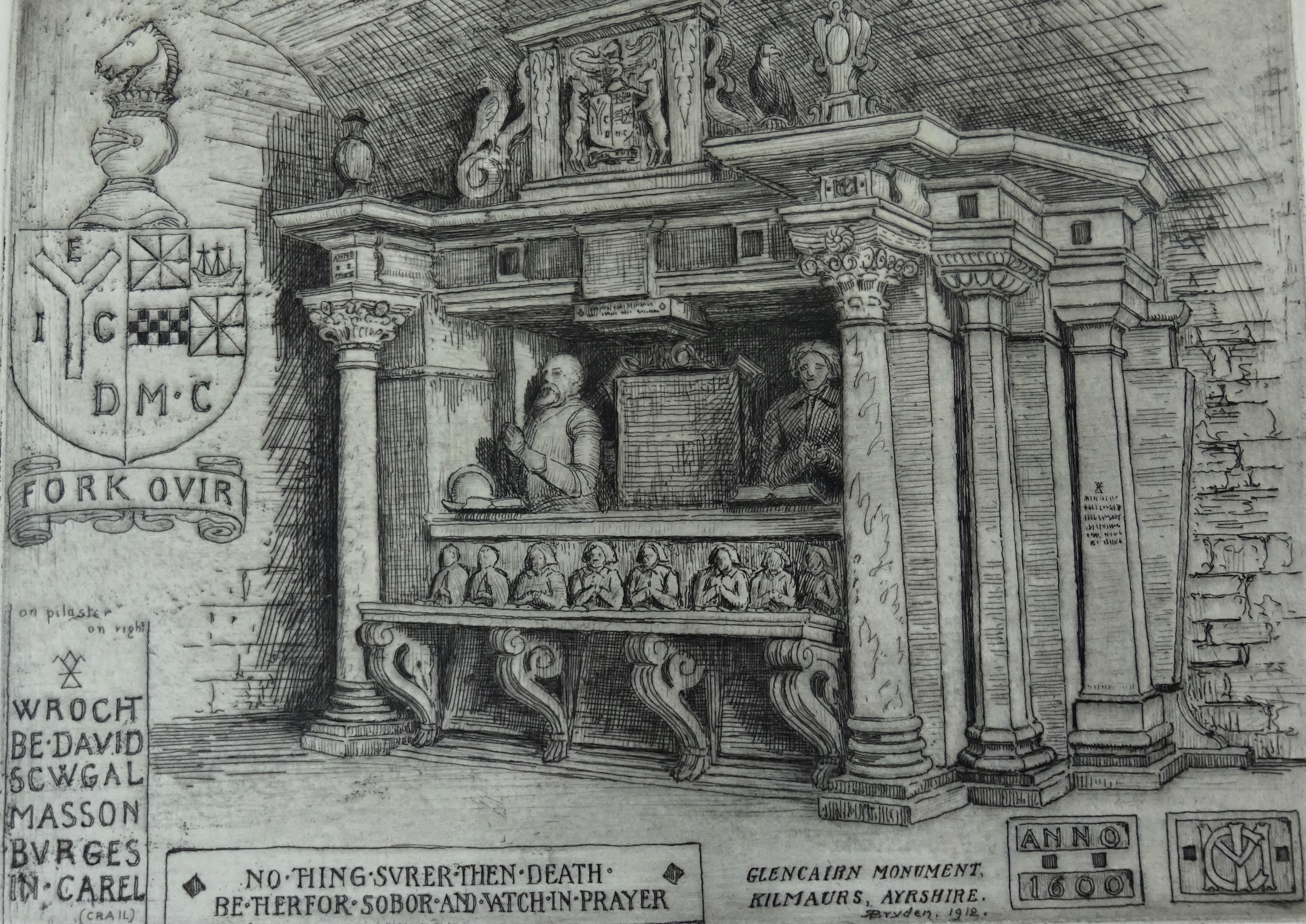
The 1600AD Glencairn Aisle Mural Monument created by Master Mason David Scougal, Kilmaurs, East Ayrshire

This is a pillar arch and effigy monument built as a burial vault for the Laird of Bargany and Ardstinchar and his wife. It is one of several "glorious tombs" built in Ayrshire in the 17th century. It was constructed following medieval traditions in an approximate Renaissance style. No mason's marks are visible, however the stonework shows considerable erosion and it may have been lost, together with the other known previously existing inscriptions.

Three receding columns on either side and support a canopy and each is topped by an over-large finial. The columns are circular, followed by octagonal and square as in the Glencairn Aisle monument. The three finials are all of a different design. A small divided pediment sits atop of a large worn armorial panel bearing the almost totally eroded carved Kennedy family Coat of Arms with still discernable supporters with two oak leaves above and a fleur-de-lis carved centrally. The Ordnance Survey Name Book records the animals carving on the right as a Griffin, however a wyvern is carved on the coat of arms over the entrance.

An awkward square sectioned baluster rises from the chest at the centre to supports the weight of the armorial panel above. It has a scroll either side and may have once carried an inscription.The four projections from the chest may have supported a Bible board, as found at the Glencairn Monument, as also indicated by the shelf at the back.

Three small carved figures have been identified by one source as 'weepers' or symbols of mourning Janet Stewart and Gilbert Kennedy had three children, a son Thomas and two daughters who died young. The carvings are identifiable as a male and two females with the male and females at prayer with their hands held upwards. The gap between the small half-length alto-relief carved figures and the four projecting trusses is further suggestive of a bible board having once been present.

As stated, four stone slabs below the figures with the four extended trusses could be pulled out to give access to the crypt below. These four rectangular stone slabs are still present, set within the smaller stone slabs that pave the floor of the aisle. It is not known when the crypt was last used or if it contains other burials than Gilbert, Jean and their three children.

The laird, Gilbert, is recumbent and shown life size in full armour with his head resting on a pillow and his legs pressed against a board. Lady Bargany lies on his left-hand side, partly within a curved alcove. Each have their hands clasped in prayer. A small rectangular cavity on the alcove wall above Lady Bargany's feet may have once carried a metal plaque.

The initials 'IS' are found on the top of the forward most right-hand side pillar, to the right of the armorial panel and to the right below the armorial shield, whilst the initials 'GK' are found in the same locations on the left-hand side. 'IS' stands for 'Janet Stewart' when using the Latin alphabet.

The Master Mason responsible for creating this monument between 1601 and 1605 is thought to have been David Scougal of Crail. His mason's mark has not been found on this monument. He signed his work at the Glencairn Aisle, "WROCH BE DAVID SCWGAL MASSON BVRGES IN CAREL 1600". Given the loss of other extensive carved text from the Kennedy Monument the survival of Scougal's mason's mark or any signature is however unlikely.

The Ordnance Survey Name Book for 1855 – 1857 states that "A recent attempt to renovate this interesting relic of antiquity has done [more] than time to deface it".

== The Glorious Tombs ==
The Bargany or Kennedy Aisle at Ballantrae in South Ayrshire of 1601 appears to have used the Glencairn Aisle monument as a model and may therefore provide some clues as to the original appearance of the Glencairn Aisle monument and vice versa. The other Ayrshire examples of 'Glorious Tombs' are the Skelmorlie Aisle at Largs of 1639, the Crauford Monument at Kilbirnie and the Hamilton Aisle at Dunlop of 1641.

== Historical timeline ==
Dates associated with the Kennedy Aisle –

1601 – Gilbert Kennedy mortally wounded at the Battle of Brochloch.

1604 (circa) – a new kirk, manse and burial aisle built by Lady Kennedy for her family and husband.

1605 – Lady Bargany, Janet/Jean Stewart died.

1605 – Baron Gilbert and Lady Bargany interred in the Kennedy Aisle.

1617 – the Scottish Parliament confirmed the establishment of a new parish kirk in Ballantrae.

1650 – the parish was disjoined from Colmonell.

1736 – the manse was replaced.

1777 – repairs were carried out on the manse.

1819 – a new parish church was built nearby.

1827 – the old kirk was demolished apart from the Kennedy Aisle.

1850s – Hew Fergussone Kennedy of Bennane had repair works carried out on the aisle and monument.

1956 – a grant of £40 (Circa £950 in 2022) from the Pilgrim Trust enabled repairs to be carried out on the aisle.
