= River Stinchar =

River in South Ayrshire, Scotland

Coordinates: 55°06′N 5°00′W

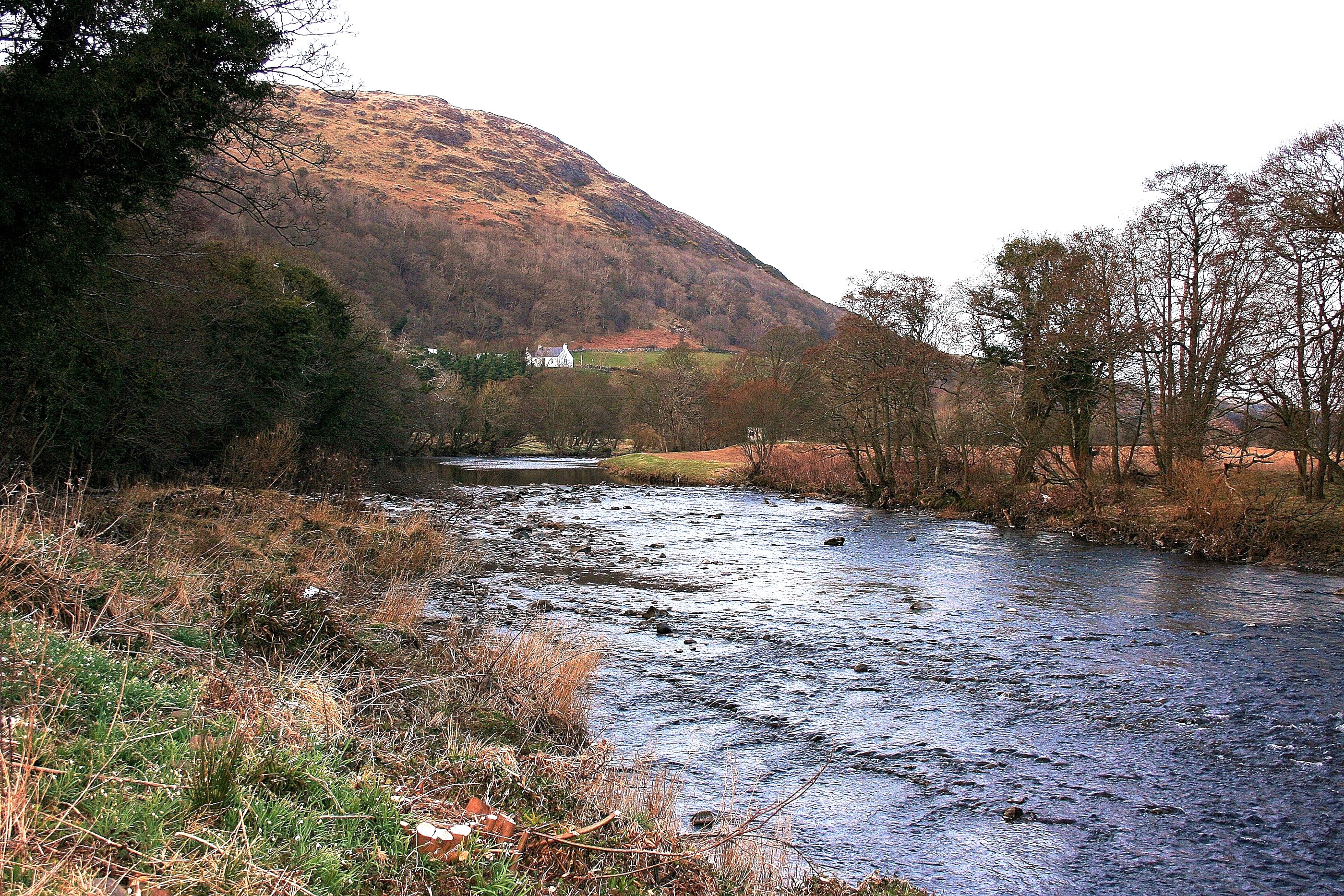
The River Stinchar at Knockdolian, South Ayrshire.

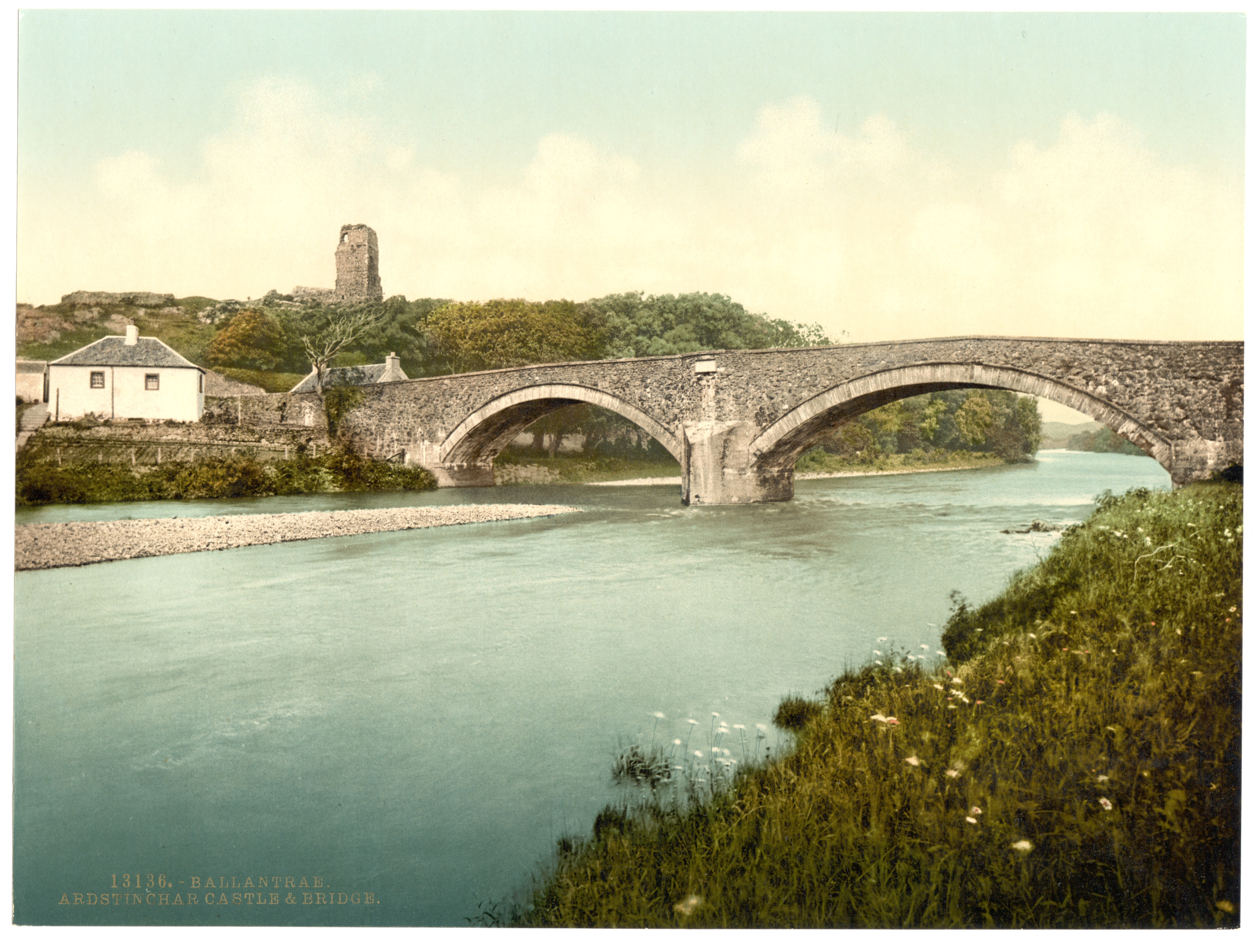
Ardstinchar Castle and the bridge over the river

The River Stinchar (/ˈstɪnʃər/ STIN-shər) is a river in South Ayrshire, Scotland. It flows south west from the Galloway Forest Park to enter the Firth of Clyde at Ballantrae, about 20 kilometres (12 miles) south-southeast of Ailsa Craig.

It is reputed poet Robert Burns fished the river, and despite being impressed by its beauty, was unable to find words to rhyme with the name.

In the mid-20th century, William MacFarlane and his family, who lived in nearby Pinmore Lodge among 900 acres (360 hectares), built motor boats under the brand of Stinchar Craft.

== See also ==
Kilwinnet
