= Thomas Kennedy of Bargany =

Scottish courtier and landowner

Thomas Kennedy of Bargany (died 1597) was a Scottish courtier and landowner.

== Life ==
=== Military career ===
Thomas Kennedy and his father fought for Regent Moray at the Battle of Langside on 13 May 1568.

=== Inheritance ===
In May 1585 Thomas Kennedy took possession of several properties in Ayr as heir to his father, in Sandgate and Woodgate, some of which his father had acquired in 1544. He was knighted in May 1590 at the coronation of Anne of Denmark. Bargany Castle, demolished in the seventeenth century, was on the south side of the Water of Girvan in Dailly parish in Ayrshire.

=== Legal issues ===
Bargany helped the Gilbert Kennedy, 4th Earl of Cassillis in an attempt to gain the lands of Crossraguel Abbey in August 1570. He brought the new owner Allan Stewart to the Earl at Maybole Castle and then they went to the Abbey, from where the Earl abducted him and took him to Dunure Castle and tortured him with fire until he signed a lease of the lands. Bargany, who was not at Dunure, realising he was implicated, sought legal help for Stewart then besieged Dunure and brought Stewart to Ayr where he revoked the lease.

In 1591 his brother-in-law, the lawyer Sir Patrick Vans of Barnbarroch, came to Ardstinchar Castle. They discussed his legal case with Sir John Seton of Barns. Seton was a kinsman of Bargany's wife, and he hoped to gain the return of lands of Lethmold, which had passed to Seton by the forfeit of the Earl of Douglas. Bargany employed another lawyer, George Mark, and wrote to Barnbarroch rehearsing his offer to Seton, and hoping he would "both effectuously and secretly" work in his favour.

=== Edinburgh riot, son forced to marry ===
Thomas Kennedy of Bargany took part in a riot in Edinburgh on 17 December 1596. The laird had appeared with others in the Tolbooth of Edinburgh and made a religious protest. The incident was regarded as a conflict between the gentlemen of the king's household known as 'cubiculars' and the financial officers called the 'Octavians'. Two family chronicles mention that Bargany was punished by James VI who arranged a marriage for his son that was to "the wreck of his house".

== Death ==
He died in November 1597.

== Family ==
He was the son of Thomas Kennedy of Bargany and Margaret Campbell, a daughter of Hew Campbell of Loudon, Sheriff of Ayr. Thomas Kennedy married Isobel Stewart, a daughter of Andrew Stewart, 2nd Lord Ochiltree and Agnes Cunningham. He married secondly Agnes Montgomerie daughter of Hugh Montgomerie, 2nd Earl of Eglinton. Their children included:

- Gilbert Kennedy of Bargany and Ardstinchar, who married his cousin Jean Stewart, a daughter of Andrew, Master of Ochiltree and Margaret Stewart, Mistress of Ochiltree. Jean Stewart was a maiden in the household of Anne of Denmark.
