= William Stewart (courtier) =

Scottish courtier

William Stewart (floruit 1585–1607) was a Scottish courtier.

== Career ==
In 1591, William Stewart was described as a valet in the chamber of James VI. The other valets in 1591 were William Murray, John Gibb, and John Stewart.

He may have been the servant of Regent Morton in 1581, mentioned in Morton's confession, who witnessed that the former regent had slept well through the night before his execution.

William Stewart served the king during his visit to Norway and Denmark, in 1589 and 1590, when he met his bride Anne of Denmark. A Danish record of the royal company listed names in rank, and Gibb and Stewart appear at the very end of the list, next to James VI's English courtier, Roger Aston.

James VI played cards in Denmark, and William Stewart acted as his pursemaster, as John Tennent had done for James V, paying out sums of money lost by the king. James VI staked Danish dalers and rose nobles from his queen's dowry. An account of the dowry mentions that Stewart gave money to the king to play on several occasions, on 4 March 1590 James lost 4 dalers at a game called "mont". The king also played a dice game called "mumchance" and lost 41 dalers. Stewart also handed out tips and gratuities when James visited the ships and at other times. James enjoyed another card game called 'maye' which he played at Kinneil House at Christmas 1588 with Roger Aston.

William and John Stewart of Rosland, both royal servants, were rewarded with the escheat, the forfeited property, of James Hall of Foulbar in 1591. James VI wrote on 29 May 1591 to Robert Mure of Caldwell, requesting him to ask Lord Ross of Halkhead to pay annual rents owed to the royal servants John Stewart of Rosland and William Stewart for the lands of Foulbar.

In April 1592 James VI sent Stewart to warn the Earl of Atholl to attend him at Perth. Stewart was still a valet in the king's chamber in 1594 when clothes costing £300 Scots were bought for him to wear at the baptism of Prince Henry.

== John Stewart, the usher and the valet ==
John Stewart of Rosland at Rothesay, was usher of the inner chamber door. John Stewart of Rosland married Jonet Graham, and acquired lands at Partick. Their daughter Jonet Stewart married Ninian Stewart. He witnessed a charter in the king's chamber at Holyrood Palace on 8 January 1588. This John Stewart may be the royal servant mentioned in testimony about Valentine Thomas's visit to Holyrood in 1597.

Another John Stewart was a valet to James VI from 1573. He was a son of John Stewart, Constable of Stirling Castle, and Margaret Maxtoun.

== Other contemporaries called William Stewart ==
There were several men called William Stewart active in this period, including:

- William Stewart of Grandtully and Banchrie, (1567–1646), royal servant
- William Stewart of Houston, known as Colonel Stewart, who also attended James VI in Denmark.
- William Stewart (skipper), of Dundee, captain of one of the ships of James VI in Denmark.
- William Stewart of Monkton (d. 1588), Provost of Ayr.
- William Stewart of Caverston, Captain of Dumbarton Castle.
