= Gilbert Kennedy of Bargany and Ardstinchar =

Gilbert Kennedy of Bargany and Ardstinchar (c. 1577 – 1601) was a Scottish landowner and murder victim. Kennedy had inherited a long-standing family feud with John Kennedy, 5th Earl of Cassillis, on the death of his father, Thomas Kennedy of Bargany. On 11 December 1601 he met the Earl and his followers at Pennyglen near Maybole and was murdered with a lance thrust in his back.

== Biography ==
Gilbert Kennedy was the third son of Thomas Kennedy of Bargany and Agnes Montgomerie daughter of Hugh Montgomerie, 2nd Earl of Eglinton. Bargany Castle, demolished in the 17th century, was on the south side of the river Girvan in Dailly parish in Ayrshire.

In the spring of 1597 Kennedy married Jean Stewart a daughter of the Andrew, Master of Ochiltree and Margaret Stewart, Mistress of Ochiltree. Jean was a maiden in the household of Anne of Denmark and her mother was a senior lady in waiting. They had a son Thomas and two daughters who died young.

Two chronicles, possibly by the same author, state that James VI of Scotland arranged his marriage to a bride without a dowry to punish the family because Thomas Kennedy laird of Bargany had taken part in a riot in Edinburgh on 17 November 1596. The laird had appeared with others in the Tolbooth of Edinburgh and made a religious protest. The incident was regarded as a conflict between the gentlemen of the king's household known as "cubiculars" and the financial officers called the "Octavians". As the chronicles mention, after this disturbance Lord Lindsay of the Byres' property was forfeit, and Bargany was punished by a marriage that was to "the wreck of his house".

However, what is known about the marriage contract and settlement contradicts the story found in the chronicles. James VI bought the bride clothes and paid for food and musicians at the wedding in Edinburgh. Anne of Denmark first tried to obtain Lord Lindsay's forfeit as a dowry for Jean Stewart. Then she arranged a loan for the dowry, asking Sir William Stewart of Traquair, Jean Stewart's brother-in-law who had protected the king on the day of the riot, to be a cautioner for the money. In 1615 the dowry or "tochter" money was still unpaid, and their son claimed the sum from Sir John Stewart of Traquair and his legal tutor Robert Stuart. In April 1615 the Privy Council of Scotland wrote to King James that Traquair ought not to be liable because Sir William had been following the queen's direction "whose commandment was ever unto him a law". The Privy Council noted that the king and queen were also cautioners and "personallie bound in the contract". In May, Anne of Denmark asked her lady-in-waiting Jean Ker, Countess of Roxburghe to write to her husband to intercede with James to the same effect, to pay what Traquair owed for the dowry.

Thomas Kennedy of Bargany died on 7 November 1597 and Gilbert Kennedy became the laird of Bargany and Ardstinchar.

Kennedy was drawn into the long-standing family feud with John Kennedy, 5th Earl of Cassillis. On 3 January 1598 Thomas Kennedy of Culzean, called the Tutor of Cassillis, shot pistols at Bargany's servants Alexander Kennedy and David Mure and others at Maybole and pursuing them the next day at the Place of Auchendrane. The Tutor claimed that Alexander Kennedy had been insinuated into his household, and he had been ambushed in Maybole.

Although Bargany had helped the earl at Inch Castle, on 11 December 1601 he met the earl and his followers at Pennyglen near Maybole and was killed with a lance thrust in his back. The Earl claimed in his defence to the Privy Council that Bargany's party that day included men denounced by the king as rebels that he had a commission to pursue with fire and sword. The lawyer Thomas Hamilton challenged this defence, but Cassillis and followers (all named) were found not guilty.

Jean Stewart Lady Bargany was required to deliver her houses of Ardstinchar, Bargany, Newark, and her house in Ayr to the king's herald in 1603. She continued the feud by legal means, but also received several royal gifts by privy seal letter. She died in Edinburgh in September 1605 and left a will with an inventory of her belongings including her clothes, jewellery, beds, and six "stands" or sets of tartan curtains. There were two "hagbuts" or muskets and six small "iron pieces" or pistols.

Jean Stewart was buried with her husband in the new burial aisle they had built at Ballantrae close to Ardstinchar Castle. The monument has been discussed in connection with the architecture of Anna of Denmark and David Cunningham of Robertland.

== Thomas Kennedy of Bargany and Margaret Stewart ==
Their son, Thomas Kennedy of Bargany married his cousin Margaret Stewart, daughter of Josias Stewart of Bonytoun who had been the executor of Jean's will and his legal tutor. She left him in 1619, complaining of his lack of respect to her and her father. On 6 October 1619 after her usual morning prayers at Bargany Castle, she was walking in the garden with her psalm book in her hands, and was surprised by her husband's servant Patrick Kennedy, who asked where she had been. Patrick complained to Thomas about her answer and said she called him "his tutor". This enraged Thomas who found her in the gardener's house and he punched and kicked her. Although the gardener Thomas Todie intervened as she tried to escape Thomas caught up with her again and dragged her by the hair back towards Bargany House (the distance of three archery butts), and up a narrow stair to the gallery, banging her head against the sides. Thomas left her unconscious on the gallery floor and locked her alone in the castle. Margaret found her way out of the back door and escaped through the hedge and waded through the deep water of the Girvan, hiding in the woods and reaching the safety of her aunt's house at Dailly the next day. Then she rode to Ardstinchar Castle hoping to find her father but had to stay in a barn until Lord Ochiltree arrived. She came to Edinburgh where her father and John Jolie, doctor of physic looked after her. Meanwhile, in November Thomas was at Ballintrae and played golf on the links called the Green of Ardstinchar with his friends. The Privy Council of Scotland upheld her complaint.
