= Culross Palace =

Merchant's house in Fife, Scotland

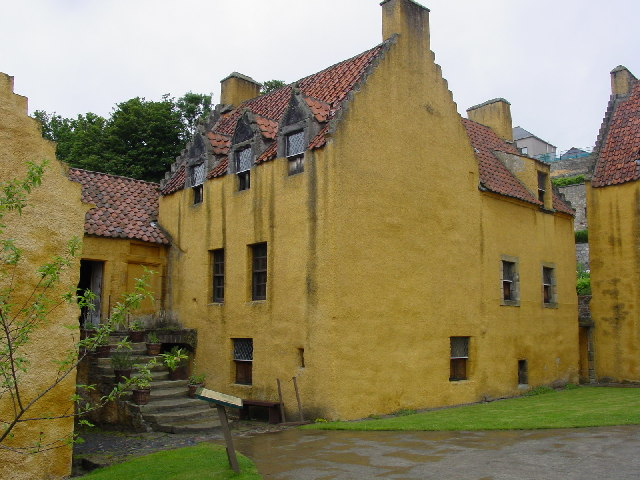
- Culross Palace courtyard.
- Interactive map of the Culross Palace area

General information
- Coordinates: 56.05573°N 3.63107°W

Scheduled monument
- Official name: The Palace, Culross, palace and gardens
- Designated: 10 February 1992
- Reference no.: SM5288

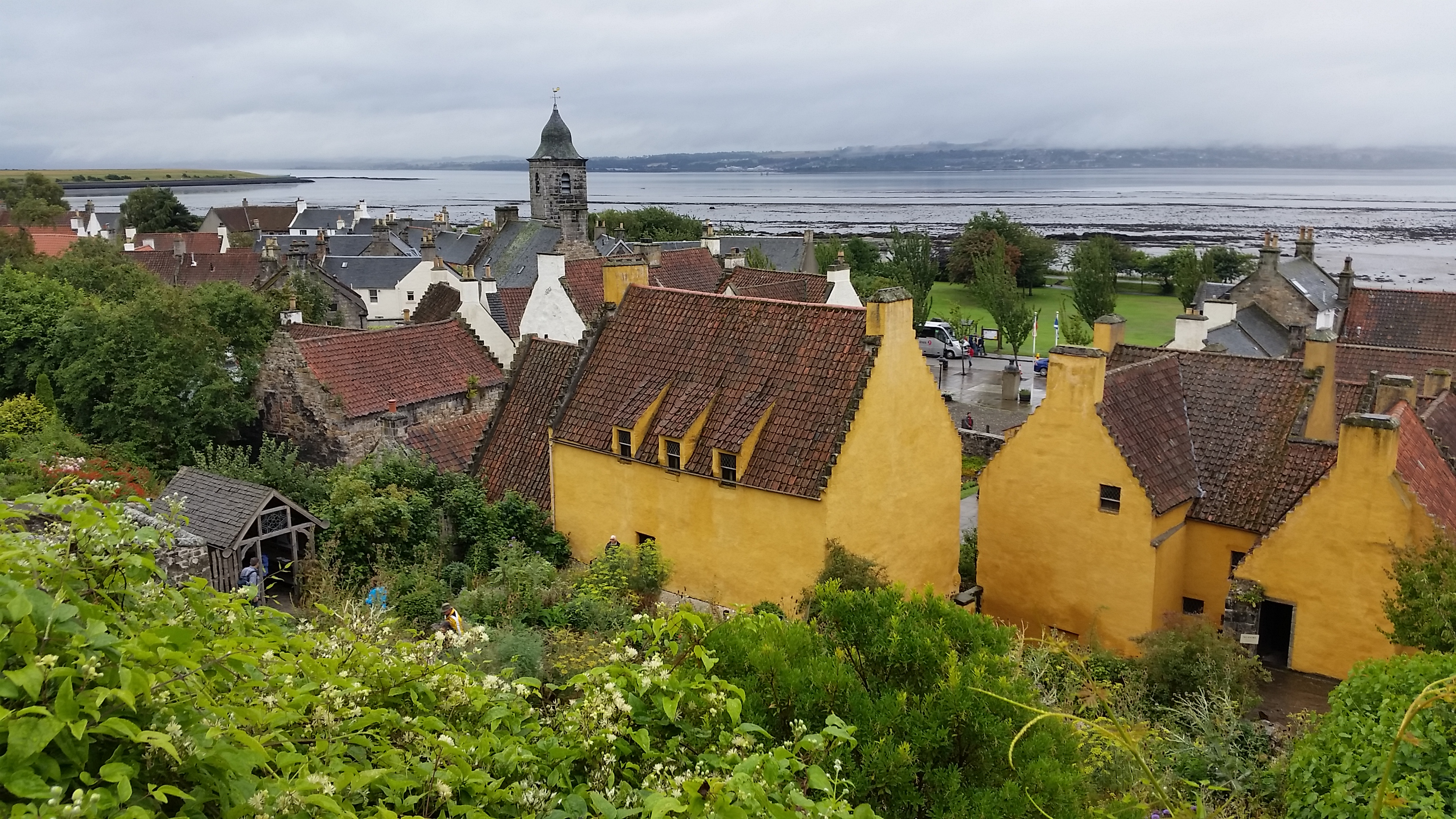
Culross Palace from top of its garden, Culross and Firth of Forth in the distance, August 2018

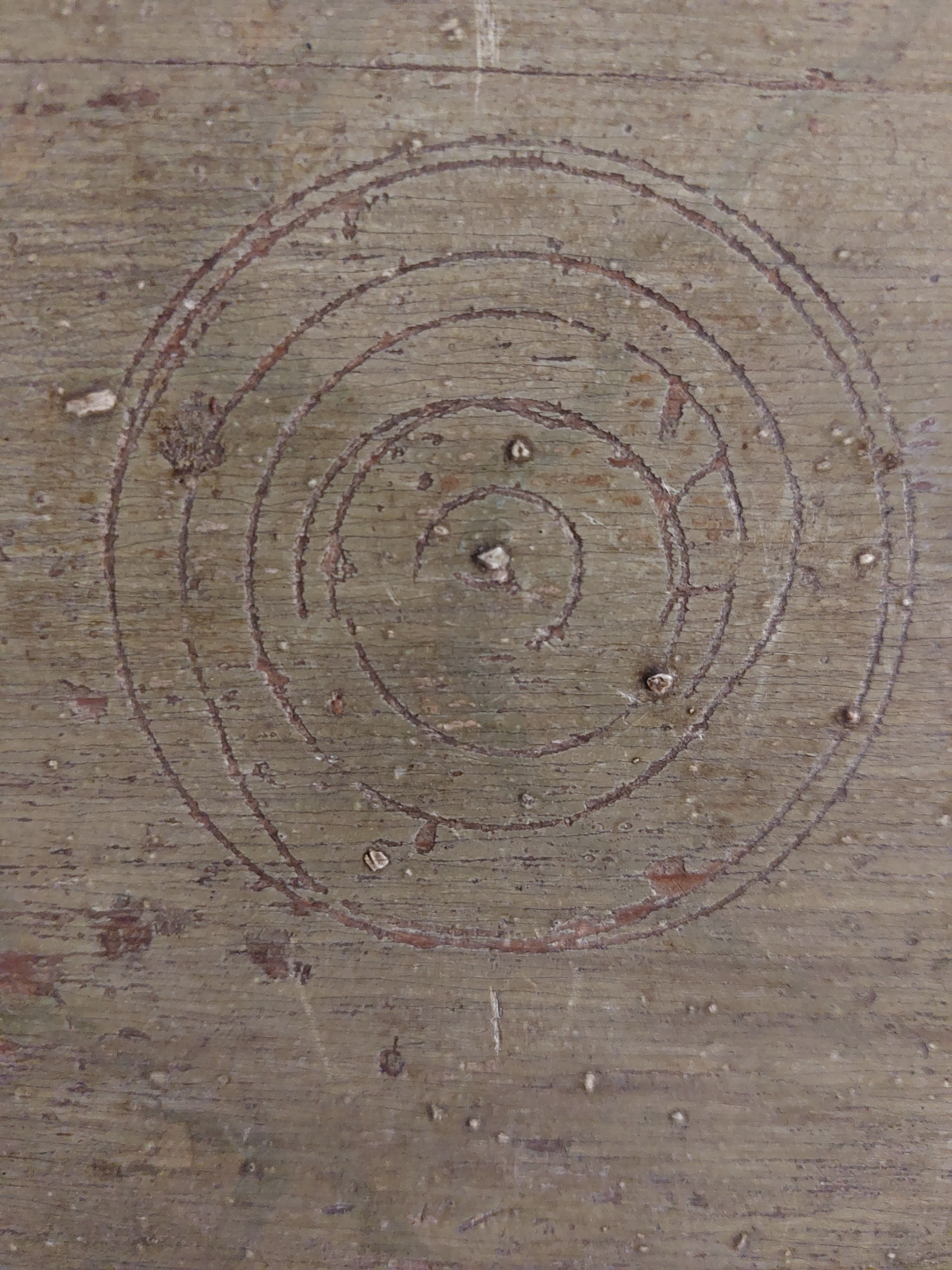
'Witch marks' above a fireplace in Culross Palace. These marks were thought to guard against witches coming down the chimney.

Culross Palace is a late 16th to early 17th century merchant's house in Culross, Fife, Scotland.

The palace, or "Great Lodging", was constructed between 1597 and 1611 by Sir George Bruce, the Laird of Carnock. The house was mainly built in two campaigns. The south block in 1597 and the north building in 1611, the year when George Bruce was knighted. Bruce was a successful merchant who had a flourishing trade with other Forth ports, the Low Countries and Sweden. He had interests in coal mining, salt production, and shipping, sending William Stewart to Spain for wine, and is credited with sinking the world's first coal mine to extend under the sea.

Many of the materials used in the construction of the palace were obtained during the course of Bruce's foreign trade. Baltic pine, red pantiles, and Dutch floor tiles and glass were all used. The exterior boasts the use of crow-stepped gables, including a statue of a veiled woman posing on the gable step. The palace features fine interiors, with decorative mural and ceiling painting, 17th and 18th-century furniture and a fine collection of Staffordshire and Scottish pottery.

Although it was never a royal residence, James VI visited the Palace in 1617. The palace is now in the care of the National Trust for Scotland who have restored a model seventeenth-century garden, complete with raised beds, a covered walkway and crushed shell paths. The herbs, vegetables and fruit trees planted in the garden are types that were used in the early seventeenth century.

The renaissance paintwork was restored in 1932 for the National Trust and again in the 1990s by conservators from Historic Environment Scotland. On the second floor of the south block a ceiling painting includes 16 emblems adapted from Geffrey Whitney's A Choice of Emblemes (London, 1586). The north block has the fragmentary remains of a scene showing the Judgement of Solomon, and extensive original decorative painting.

== See also ==
- Scheduled monuments in Fife
