= Thomas Kennedy of Culzean =

Scottish landowner

Thomas Kennedy of Culzean (died 1602) was a Scottish landowner involved in a feud and a murder victim.

== Background ==
He was a son of Margaret Kennedy, Countess of Cassillis and Gilbert Kennedy, 3rd Earl of Cassillis. Thomas Kennedy married Elizabeth McGill, after she divorced Robert Logan of Restalrig. He became a gentleman of the privy chamber of James VI of Scotland in October 1580, and was knighted at the coronation of Anne of Denmark in May 1590.

== Feud ==
He was involved in a feud between Cassillis and Bargany Kennedy families. Kennedy was the Tutor of Cassillis, administrator of the estates of his nephew, John Kennedy, 5th Earl of Cassillis. In a battle between these factions, in December 1601, the Earl's men fatally wounded the Laird of Bargany who was returning home from Ayr. Bargany's younger brother, Thomas Kennedy of Drummurchie, murdered Thomas Kennedy at Saint Leonard's Chapel near Ayr on 11 May 1602. The body was taken to Greenan Castle and later buried at Maybole. Culzean's son-in-law, James Mure of Auchindrayne, was executed for the murder.

== Portrait ==
A portrait of Thomas Kennedy dated 1592 giving his age as 43, attributed to the Edinburgh-based artist Adrian Vanson, is displayed by the National Trust for Scotland at Culzean Castle. The painting has his arms and a motto "AVISE A LA FIN".

- Portrait of Sir Thomas Kennedy, ArtUK
