= Kilwinnet =

Kilwinnet is the name of two Scottish landed estates, one in Stirlingshire dating from the 13th century, and the other in Ayrshire from 1992 - both currently are owned by the Wilson family.

John Wilson of Kilwinnet is head of the heraldic House of Wilson of Kilwinnet, Ayrshire.
