= William Stewart of Caverston =

Scottish landowner

William Stewart of Caverston and Traquair (died 1605), was a Scottish landowner and Captain of Dumbarton Castle.

== Career ==
He was a brother of Sir John Stewart of Traquair. His lands were at Caverston, or Caberston, sometimes given as "Taberstoun". Caverston was a property of the Traquair Stewarts in Innerleithen parish with a fortified house. No visible traces of Caberston Tower remain. Regent Moray gave William Stewart a charter of the lands of "Caverstoun" in January 1568, which notes that the lands in Peeblesshire were formerly held from the Earl of Bothwell and were part of the Barony of Crichton.

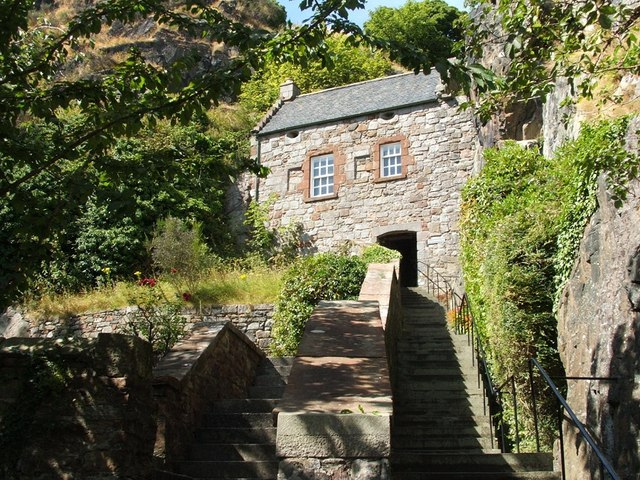
Dumbarton Castle, the "chamber between the craigs"

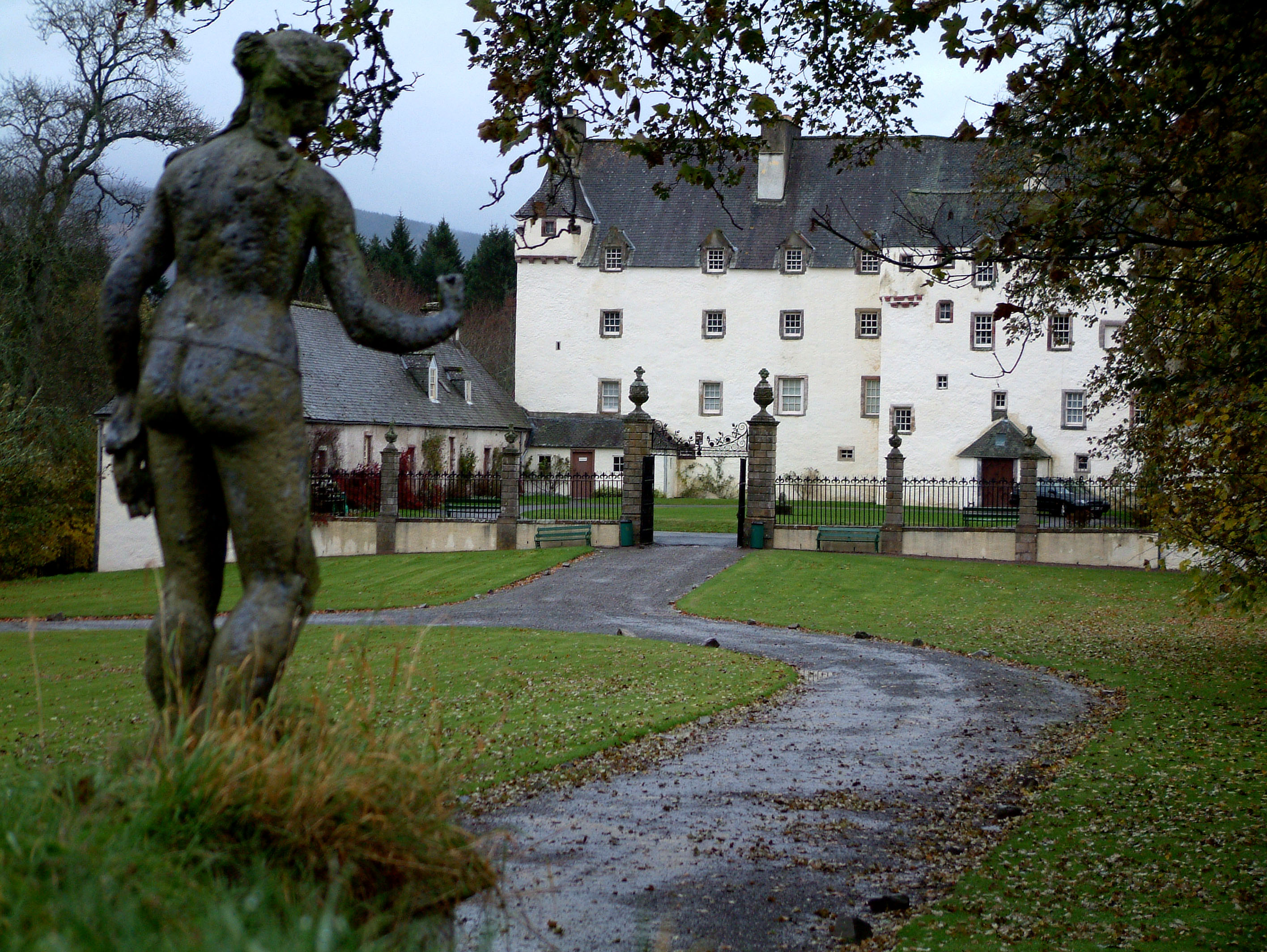
William Stewart inherited Traquair from his brother in 1594

Anthony Standen wrote a narrative describing the escape of Mary, Queen of Scots, and Henry Stuart, Lord Darnley, from Holyrood Palace in March 1566. In one version of this account, Standen mentions that William Stewart accompanied his older brother and the royal party on the ride to Dunbar Castle.

Stewart was appointed an extraordinary attendant at the court of James VI of Scotland in 1580. An extraordinary postholder was not expected to be present at court at all times, unless required by the Lord Chamberlain, and might not have a fee. He was one of the 25 gentlemen appointed to ride and pass to the fields with James VI in May 1580, with Roger Aston, Patrick Hume of Polwarth, John Stewart of Baldynneis, John Carmichael, and Walter Stewart of Blantyre.

In 1580 Stewart captured John Cunningham of Drumquhassil in Edinburgh. Drumquhassil had opposed the delivery of Dumbarton Castle to the king's favourite Esmé Stewart. Drumquhassil surrendered the keeping of Dumbarton to Stewart, with an inventory of the munitions and furnishings. The inventory gives useful information about locations in the castle, including the "chamber between the craigs" that can still be visited today. Stewart and Drumquhassill signed the inventory on 27 August 1580. After this, Stewart was officially the deputy captain of Dumbarton.

Esmé Stewart, Duke of Lennox, rewarded Caverston for his loyalty with the tenancy of the lands of Inzertoun in Dalkeith. When Lennox was threatened by the Raid of Ruthven, he fled to safety at Dumbarton.

In March 1583, Stewart swore an oath of his continuing loyalty and service to James VI as captain of Dumbarton. In May he was asked to open and inspect a locked chest containing Esmé Stewart's letters at Dumbarton with Walter Stewart of Blantyre. They were looking for a copy of the Articles of Association, a scheme to return Mary, Queen of Scots to power in Scotland.

In August 1583, after the fall of the Gowrie Regime, the English ambassador Robert Bowes heard that Stewart would also get the role in the royal wardrobe held by James Murray.

In September 1583 he mediated between James Stewart, Earl of Arran and Colonel Stewart who were contesting the reward of a forfeited estate, called an "escheat". He joined the Privy Council in June 1584, and was made Commendator of Dryburgh Abbey in 1584 and 1585, replacing David Erskine. This was a position giving a valuable income.

In May 1585 Stewart came to Edinburgh with the king's letter asking the town council for a loan of 1000 merks, for soldiers for the English border.

In 1585 the former royal favourite James Stewart, Earl of Arran was said to have embarked on a boat in Ayrshire carrying royal jewellery including "Kingis Eitche" or "Great H of Scotland". William Stewart of Caverston or William Stewart of Monkton negotiated the recovery of the royal jewels from the Earl of Arran and his wife Elizabeth Stewart, Lady Lovat, about ship on the Fairlie Roads. Stewart delivered the "Great H" into the "king's own hands".

In 1585 Stewart gave up the keeping of Dumbarton Castle to Lord John Hamilton for a time.

== Rebel follower of the Earl of Bothwell ==
The lawyer and historian David Moysie mentions that William Stewart was a follower of Francis Stewart, 5th Earl of Bothwell and took part in the Raid of Holyrood in 1591. He was forfeited with the other raiders in May 1592.

== Laird of Traquair ==
He inherited the lands of Traquair from his older brother John Stewart in 1594, and became known as "William Stewart of Traquair". At the baptism of Prince Henry at Stirling Castle in August 1594 he was of the men appointed to carry the "paill", a red velvet canopy held up with four poles over Prince Henry during the ceremonies. Traquair also held up the canopy at the baptism of Prince Charles in 1600.

In 1597, Anne of Denmark arranged a loan for the dowry of one her maidens of honour, Jean Stewart, who was marrying Gilbert Kennedy of Bargany and Ardstinchar. She asked William Stewart of Traquair, who was Jean Stewart's brother-in-law, to be a guarantor or cautioner for the loan. Eventually, the Traquair Stewarts became liable for the loan.

William Stewart contributed 8 kids, 15 moor fowls, 2 black cocks, 28 capons and a roe deer to a banquet at Holyrood Palace for Anne of Denmark's brother, Ulrik, Duke of Holstein on 30 April 1598.

He died on 20 May 1605.

== Contemporaries called William Stewart ==
There were several men called William Stewart active in this period, including:

- William Stewart of Houston, known as Colonel Stewart.
- William Stewart, of Dundee, skipper and captain of one of the ships of James VI in Denmark. William Stewart also served as skipper of the Bruce for George Bruce of Carnock.
- William Stewart of Monkton (d. 1588), Provost of Ayr.
- William Stewart, valet of the king's chamber.
- William Stewart, a servant of Regent Morton mentioned in Morton's "Confession".

Robert Bowes' letter of 19 September 1583 to Francis Walsingham mentions Arran's brother William Stewart of Monkton, Colonel William Stewart, and William Stewart of Caverston.
