= Ballantrae =

Coordinates: 55°06′01″N 5°00′17″W

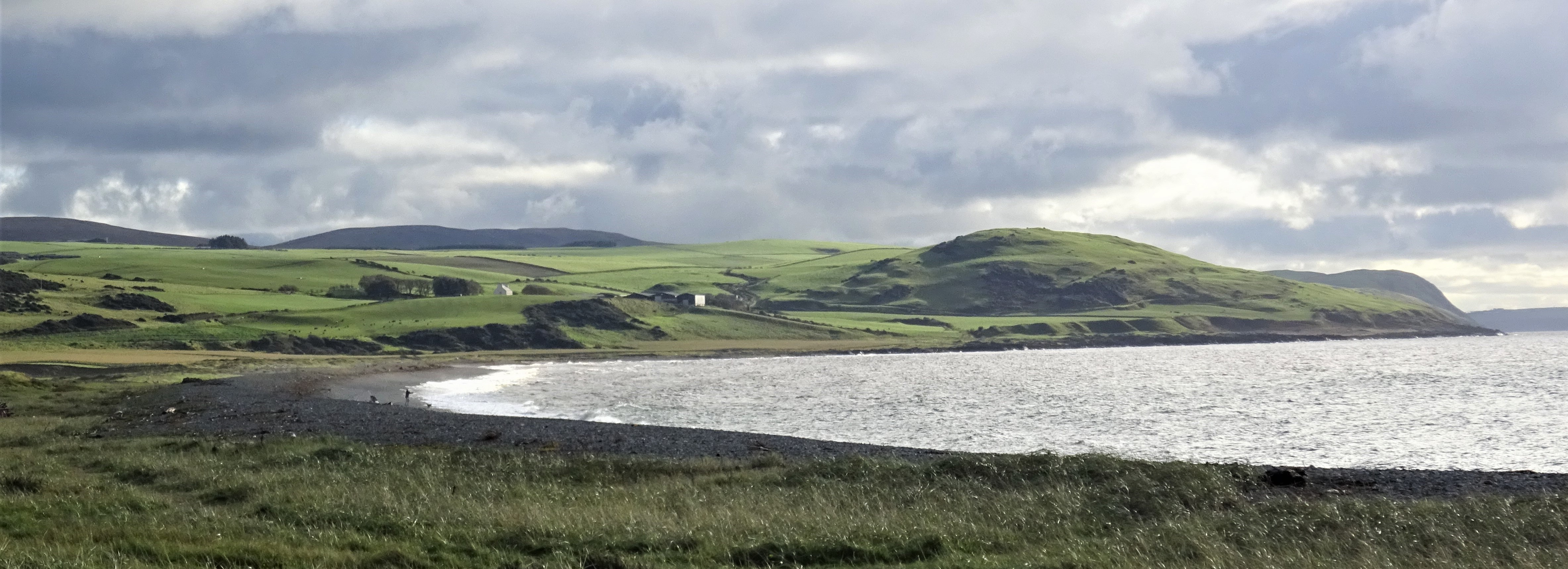
- Ballantrae beach and Bay, 2020

- Location within South Ayrshire
- OS grid reference: NX083827
  - Edinburgh: 92 mi (148 km) NE
  - London: 320 mi (515 km) SE
- Council area: South Ayrshire
- Lieutenancy area: Ayrshire and Arran
- Country: Scotland
- Sovereign state: United Kingdom
- Post town: GIRVAN
- Postcode district: KA26
- Dialling code: 01465
- Police: Scotland
- Fire: Scottish
- Ambulance: Scottish
- UK Parliament: Ayr, Carrick and Cumnock
- Scottish Parliament: Carrick, Cumnock and Doon Valley

Ballantrae is a community in Carrick, South Ayrshire, Scotland. It is located at the mouth of the River Stinchar.

== Topography ==
The name probably comes from the Scottish Gaelic Baile na Tràgha, meaning the 'town by the beach'. The beach consists of shingle and sand and offers views of Ailsa Craig, the Isle of Arran and Kintyre. The caves at Bennane Head and Balcreuchan Port are nearby. Both are associated with the legend of Sawney Bean. Ballantrae has lent its name to a subdivision of the Arenig group, which is the name applied to the lowest stage of the Ordovician system.

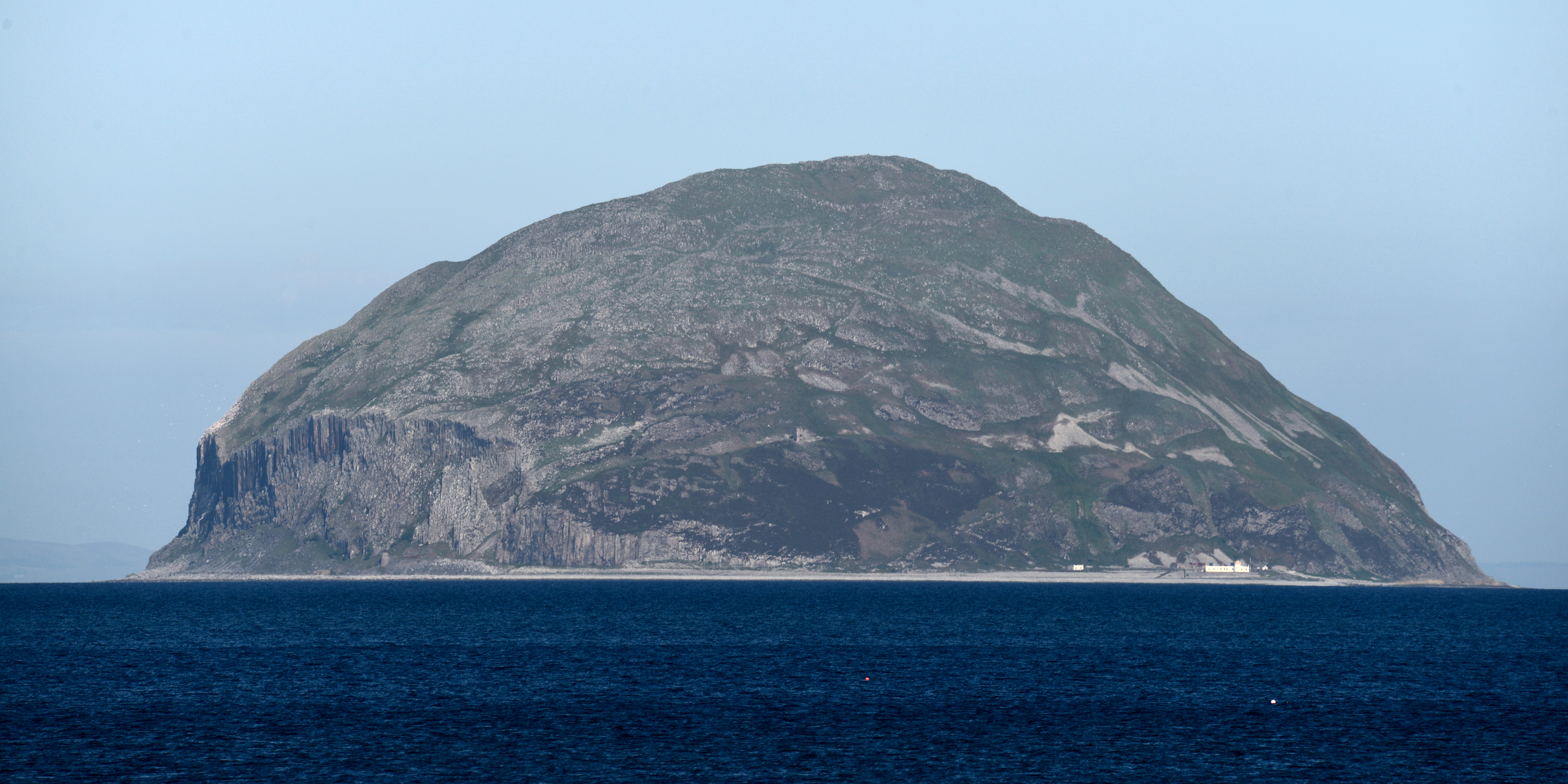
Ballantrae is located near microgranite batholith, Ailsa Craig

== History ==
The Kennedy family built Ardstinchar Castle in the 1420s. It survived until the 1770s when it was demolished and stone used to build a bridge over the River Stinchar, as well as houses in Ballantrae, including the Kings Arm's Hotel.

The first kirk in Ballantrae was built as a mausoleum containing a memorial to Gilbert Kennedy, Baron of Bargany and Ardstinchar, in about 1604. It became a part of the new parish kirk in 1617, replacing St Cuthbert's Kirk on the lands of Kirkholm. The ruined mausleum surives today as the Kennedy Aisle, part of Ballantrae Old Cemetery.

In June 1673, while holding a conventicle at Knockdow near Ballantrae, Alexander Peden was captured by Major William Cockburn, and condemned by the Privy Council to four years and three months' imprisonment on the Bass Rock and a further fifteen months in the Edinburgh Tolbooth.

The Ballantrae Windmill of 1696 on Mill Hill above the raised beach cliffs is one of the oldest industrial buildings in Scotland.

The present church was built in 1819.

James Mackay, 1st Earl of Inchcape of Strathnaver, was the owner of Glenapp Castle on the eponymous estate, and flowering shrubs spell out the name of his daughter on the opposite side of the glen. This daughter, Elsie Mackay, perished in an attempt to become the first female transatlantic aviator in 1928. She is commemorated by a stained glass window in the chancel of the church at Ballantrae. The Glenapp Castle has been converted into a luxury hotel.

=== Fishing ===
The Annual Reports of the Fishery Board for Scotland provide an insight into the state of fishing from Ballantrae in the years before the First World War. The catch typically consisted of cod and saithe.

Fishery Statistics

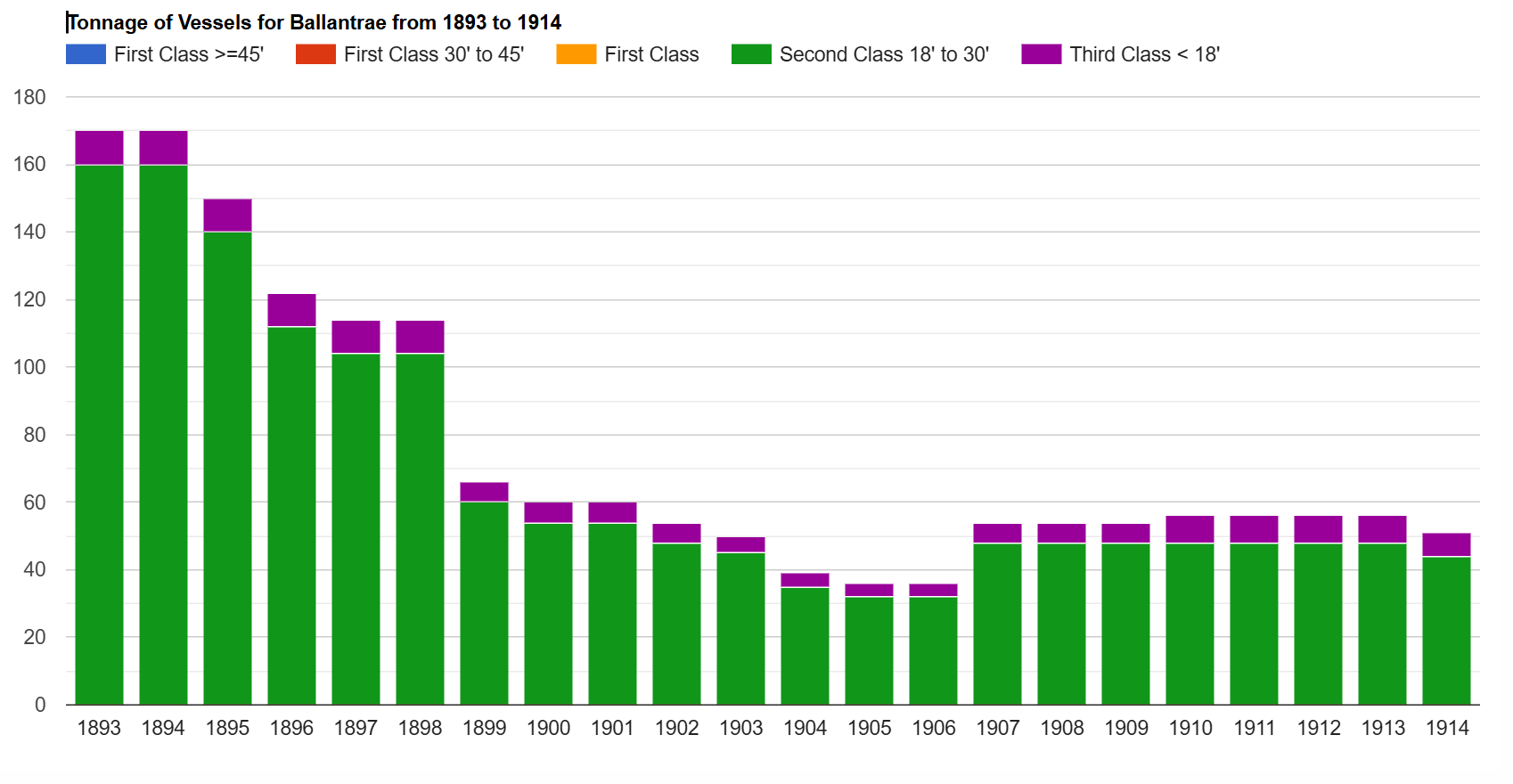
Tonnage of vessels

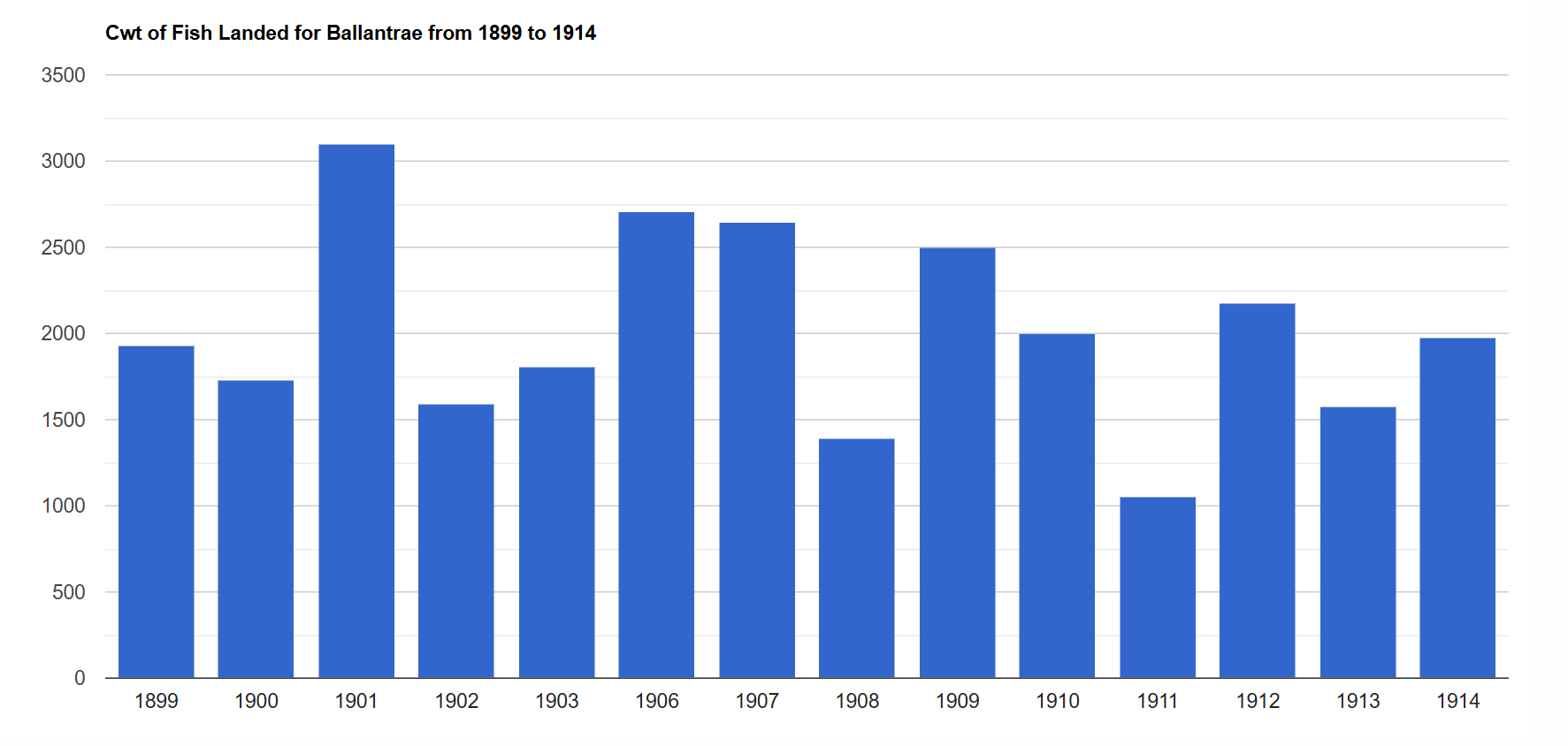
Cwt of fish landed

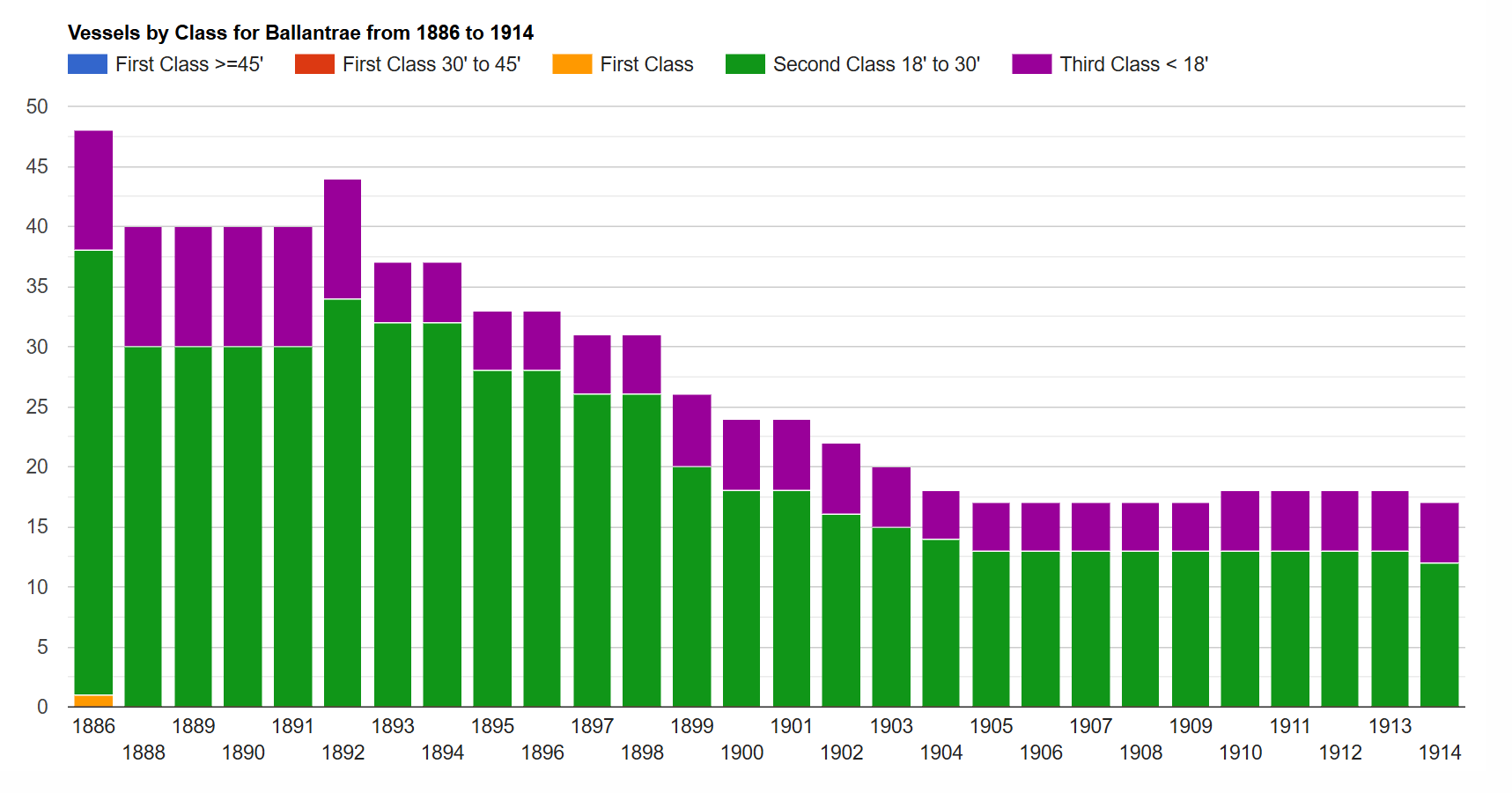
Vessels by class

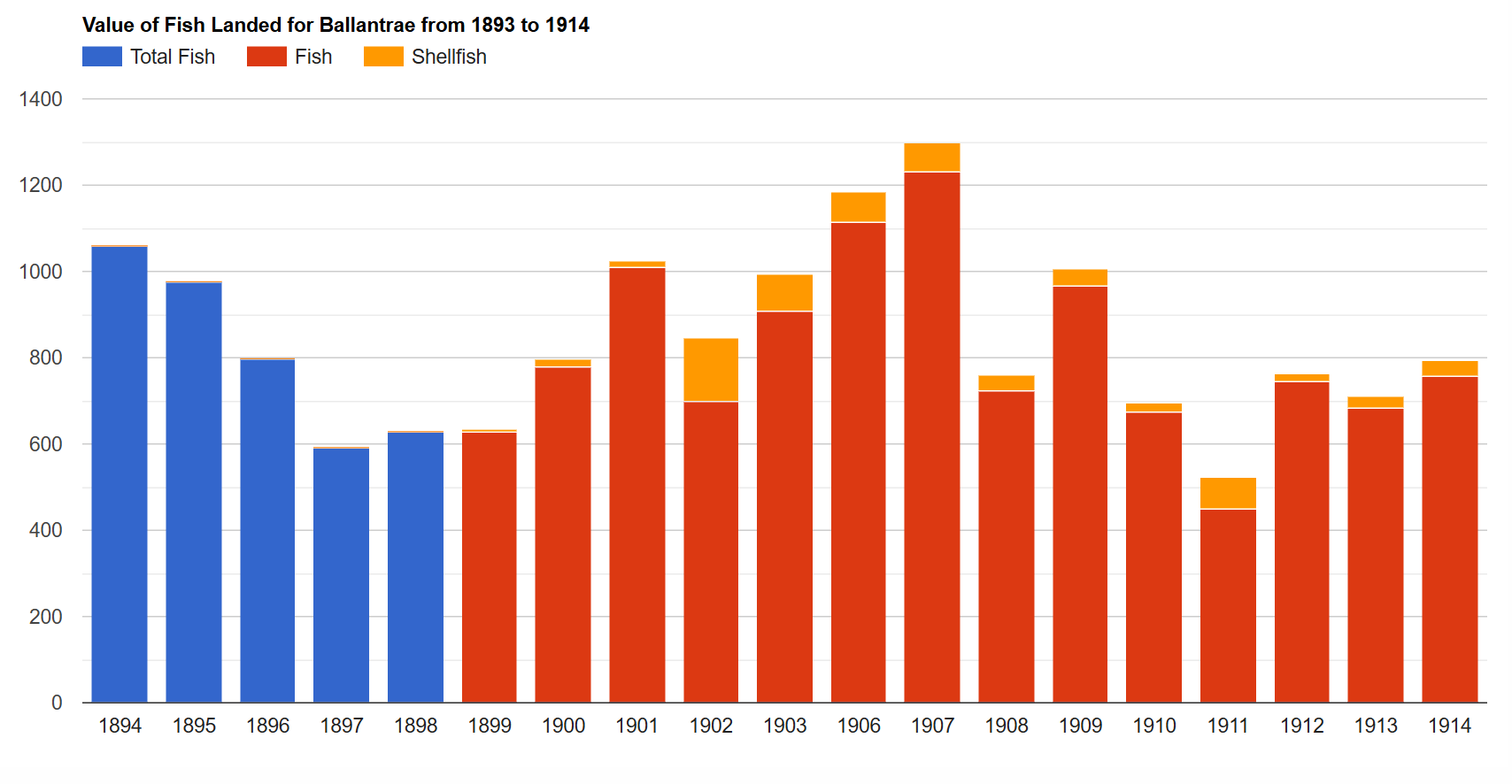
Value (£) of fish landed

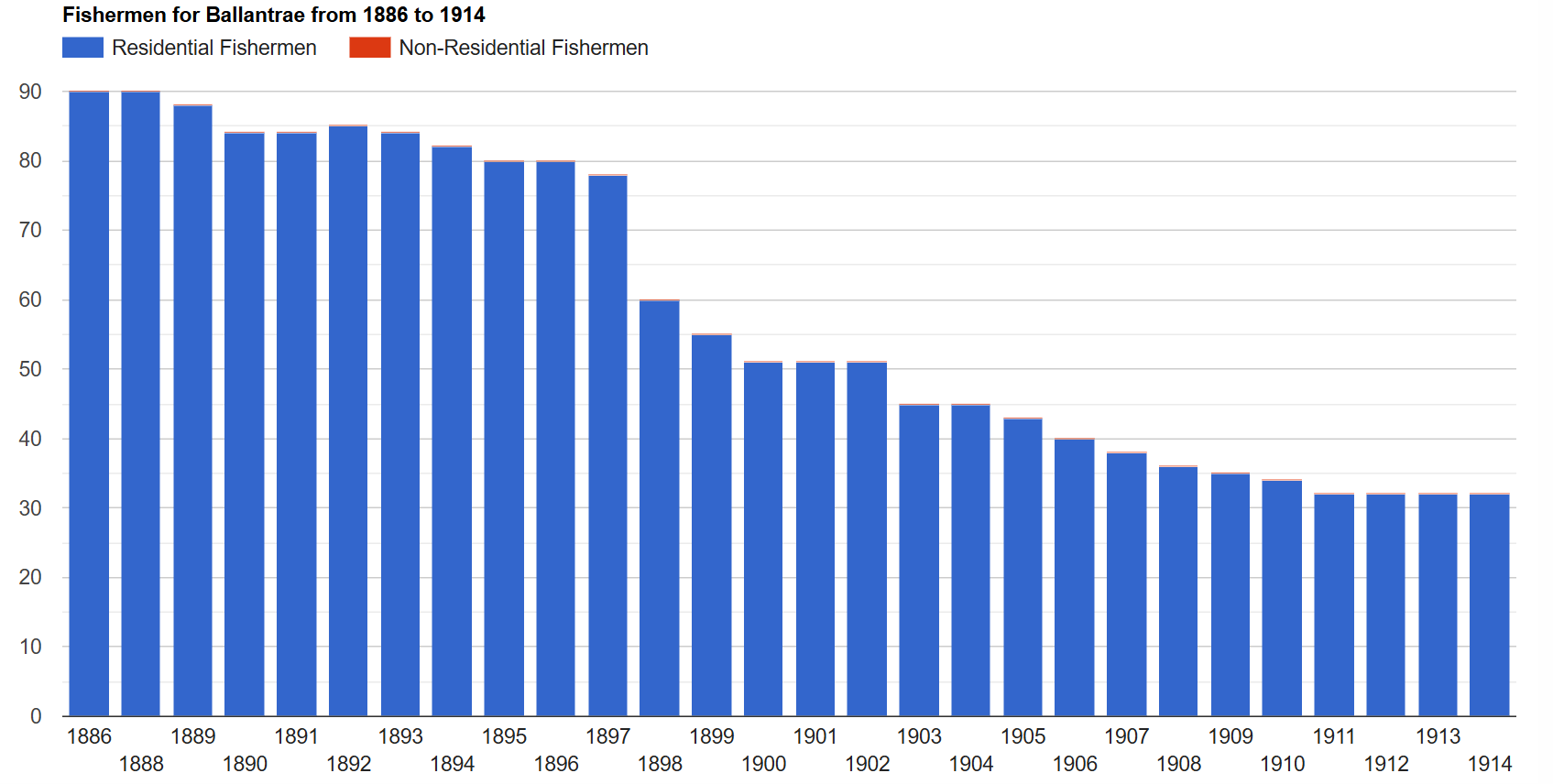
Fishermen

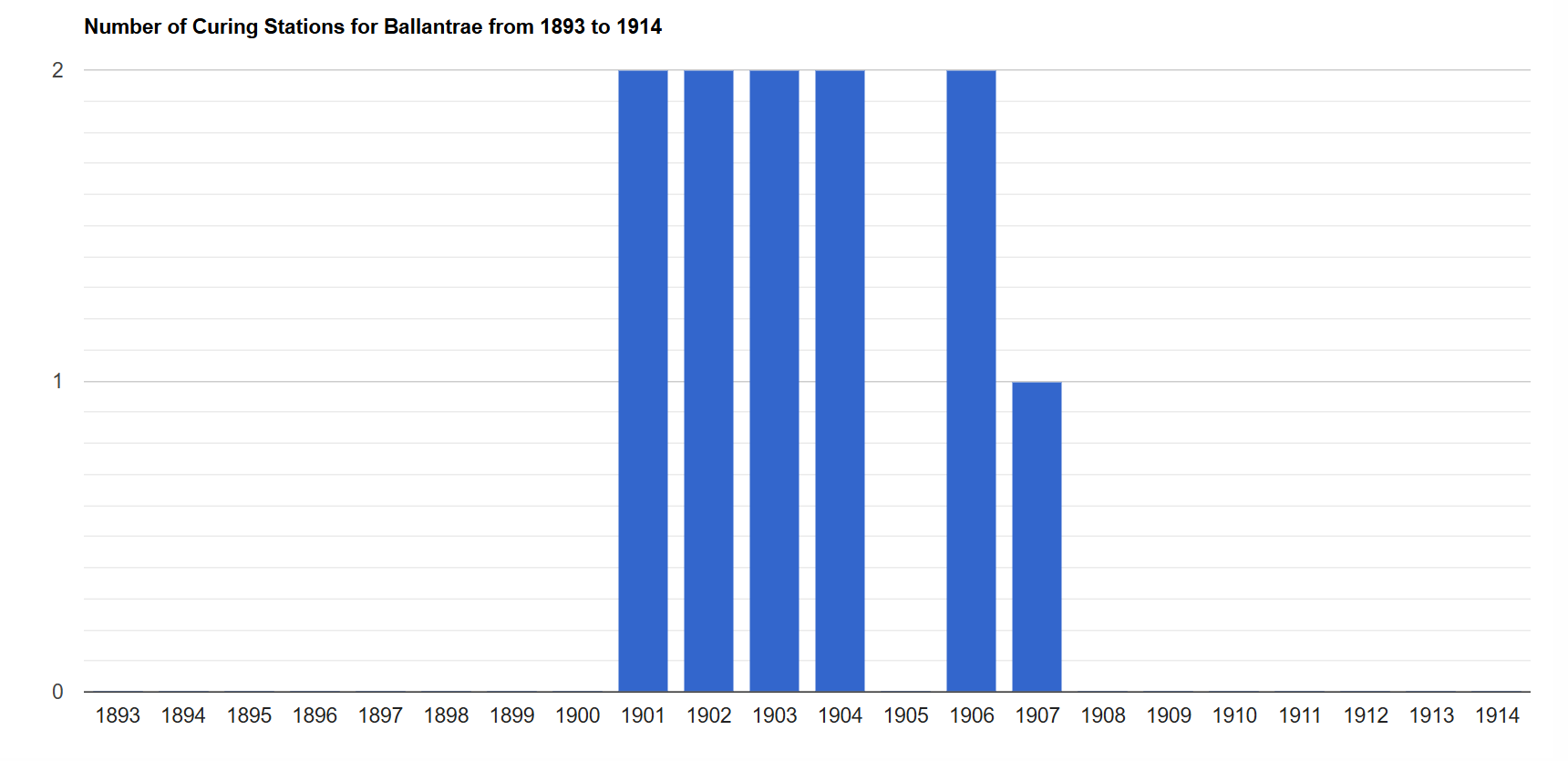
Number of curing stations

== Literature ==
When he was in the Samoan Islands writing his novel The Master of Ballantrae, Robert Louis Stevenson remembered and borrowed the name of the town he had visited on walking tours, but the setting for the novel is not that town.

== People from Ballantrae ==
- William Hunter (1861–1937), surgeon
- Struan Stevenson (1948–), former Tory MEP
