= John Kennedy, 5th Earl of Cassilis =

Scottish peer

John Kennedy, 5th Earl of Cassillis (1575 – 14 November 1615) was a Scottish peer, the son of Gilbert Kennedy, 4th Earl of Cassillis and Margaret Lyon.

He succeeded to the titles of 7th Lord Kennedy and 5th Earl of Cassillis on 14 December 1576.

In 1596 Kennedy travelled in France and Italy and wrote to Archibald Douglas from Venice.

He was one of the central figures in The Historie of the Kennedyis, an anonymous account of the feud between the Cassillis and Bargany Kennedy families published in 1830 by Robert Pitcairn. This feud climaxed in a pitched battle in December 1601, in which the Earl's men fatally wounded the Laird of Bargany who was returning home from Ayr. According to the Historie, the Earl also summarily hung a young man named Dalrymple, to whom he was related, for being a closer relation of Bargany's. In most of these deeds he was heavily influenced by his Tutor Thomas Kennedy of Culzean, which led to the murder of Culzean, by Bargany's younger brother, Thomas Kennedy of Drummurchie at Greenan Castle on 12 May 1602.

He held the office of Treasurer of Scotland on 22 March 1598/99.

== Family ==
He married Jean Fleming, (widow of John Maitland, 1st Lord Maitland of Thirlestane), on 4 November 1597. There had been a plan for him to marry a daughter of the Earl of Glencairn. She died soon after, and this was a cause of a quarrel between the families.

On 1 November 1604 he was warded in Blackness Castle for assaulting his wife. He appealed several times for his liberty to the Privy Council for the "unmannerly insolence committed by him against his wife."

== Sources ==
- Pitcairn, R., A Historical and Genealogical Account of the Principal Families of the Name of Kennedy, (Edinburgh, 1830)
- Paterson, J., History of The Counties of Ayr and Wigton: Volume 2, Carrick, (Originally published 1863 then 1871 by James Stillie, Edinburgh. Republished by Grimsay Press, Glasgow, 2003)

Peerage of Scotland
Preceded by Gilbert Kennedy	Earl of Cassilis; 1576–1615	Succeeded by John Kennedy
