= Ardstinchar Castle =

- United Kingdom
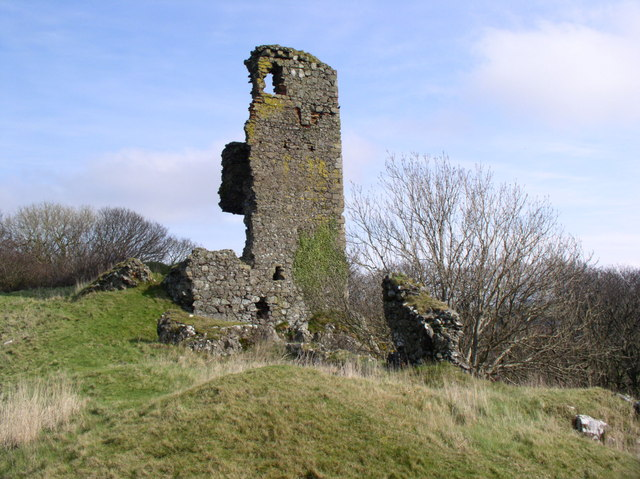
- Remains of Ardstinchar Castle

Location
- Coordinates: 55.098°N 5.00028°W
- Height: 15 metres

Site history
- Built: mid-15th century
- Built by: Hugh Kennedy of Ardstinchar
- Materials: Stone
- Fate: demolished

Ardstinchar Castle is a late medieval castle at Ballantrae, in the west coast of Ayrshire at the mouth of the River Stinchar. It was built by Hugh Kennedy of Ardstinchar in the mid-15th century. In the 1770s, the castle was demolished and the stone was used to build a bridge over the River Stinchar. Only remnants of the castle keep remain to this day. The site is a scheduled monument.

== History ==
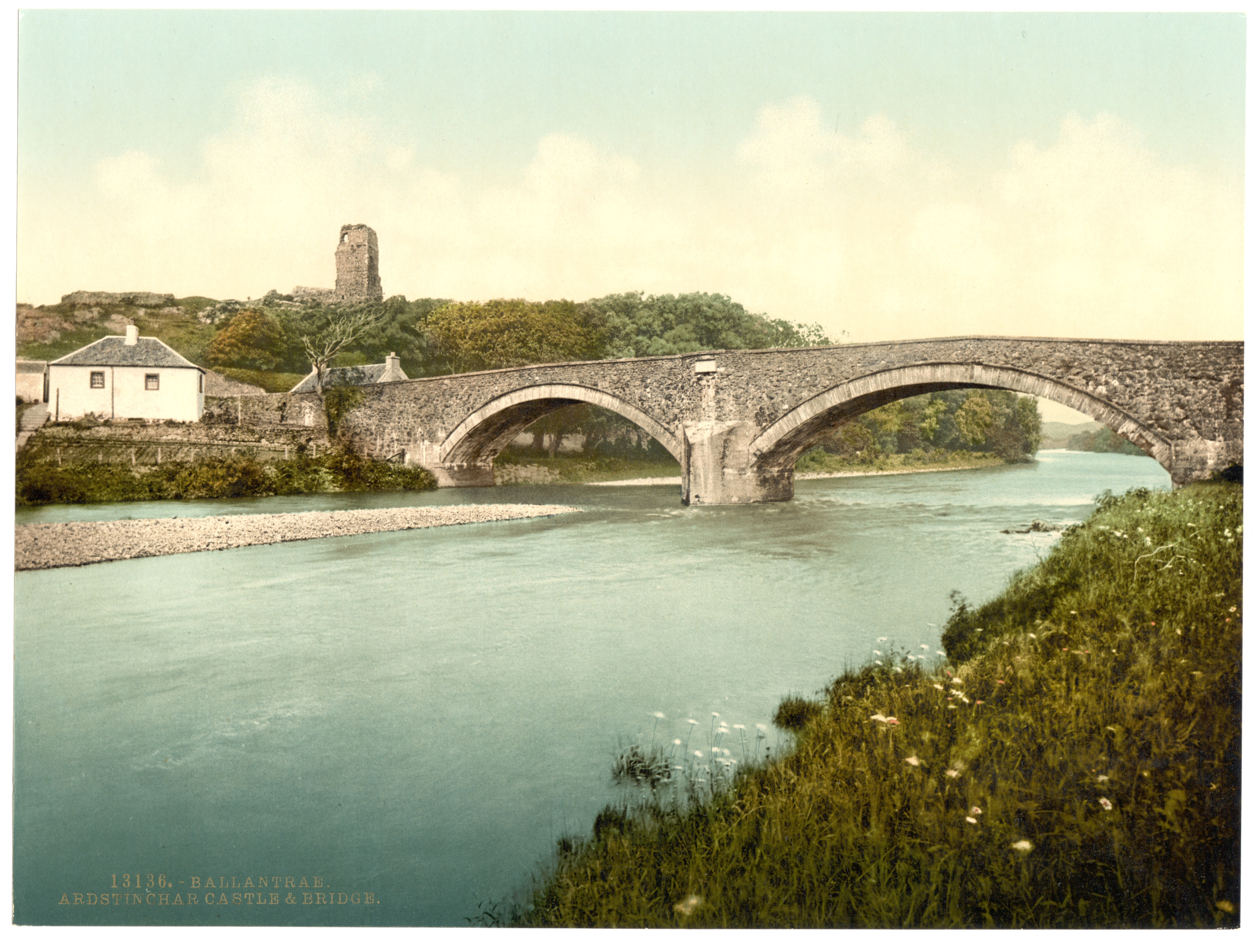
Ardstinchar Castle and bridge

Ardstinchar Castle was built by Hugh Kennedy of Ardstinchar, originally a Dominican friar who left his monastery to travel to France, where he took part in the Hundred Years' War as a mercenary and led troops for Joan of Arc at the Siege of Orléans (1428–1429). He probably inherited the land from his brother, Alexander, who died without issue, and held it by 1429. With another brother, Thomas, he combined estates to form the Barony of Ardstinchar, but retained a liferent on his own land until his death in 1454. His descendants lived in Ardstinchar Castle for more than a century.

James V of Scotland visited on 25 November 1529. Mary, Queen of Scots stayed at the castle on 8 August 1563. She is likely to have strolled and admired the view on the half turret walkway which still remains today.

A long-standing family feud between the Cassillis and Clan Kennedy, which started in Hugh Kennedy's era, ended in 1601 with the murder of the last baron of Bargany and Ardstinchar. Jean Stewart, the widow of Bargany, who had been a lady in waiting to Anne of Denmark, stayed on at Ardstinchar and resisted an attempt to evict her in 1603. She died in 1605. The family fortunes were lost, and the estate was bought by Sir John Hamilton of Letterick, son of the 1st Marquis of Hamilton.

By 1770, the castle had fallen into disrepair and was quarried to provide stone for the construction of a three-arch bridge over the River Stinchar, as well as several houses and an inn in Ballantrae, now the King's Arms Hotel.

== Architecture ==
Little remains of the castle today apart from the ruins of the keep on a rocky hill. The original castle was wedge-shaped and had three square towers connected by battlement walls. The gatehouse was on the north side, and the keep was in the southeast part of the courtyard with a long hall house alongside.

The remains of the castle are situated on the rock outcrop summit near the river. The main tower is 8.7 by 6 metres (29 ft × 20 ft) and walls are 1.1 metres (3 ft 7 in) thick. From the ground, it has a height of 15 metres (49 ft). The remains of the other towers are too small to measure. The courtyard wall varies from 1 to 1.6 metres (3 ft 3 in to 5 ft 3 in) wide. A rock-cut trench, 8 metres (26 ft) wide and 1.5 metres (4 ft 11 in) deep, lies outside the north-east courtyard wall, and there is another shallow trench in the west.

== See also ==
- Balthayock Castle
