= Bohan =

Bohan may refer to:

== People ==
- Bohan Dixon, English footballer
- Bohan Phoenix, Chinese-American rapper
- Caren Bohan, American journalist
- Catherine Bohan, Irish swimmer
- Daniel Bohan, Canadian Catholic prelate
- Eddie Bohan, Irish politician
- Edmund Bohan, New Zealand historian, biographer, novelist, singer, and author
- Elizabeth Baker Bohan (1849–1930), British-born American author and artist
- Gloria Bohan, American businesswoman
- Harry Bohan, Irish Catholic priest, sociologist and hurling manager
- Jim Bohan, Australian rules footballer
- John R. Bohan (1824–1886), Irish-born American politician
- Kamaruddin Bohan, Malaysian footballer
- Leo Bohan, Australian rules footballer
- Marc Bohan (1926–2023), French fashion designer
- Mick Bohan, Gaelic football coach
- Owen Bohan, Irish piper
- Patrick Bohan, American saloonkeeper
- Seamus Bohan, Irish politician

== Places ==
- Stone of Bohan, son of Reuben, a place referred to in the Book of Joshua
- Bohan, Wallonia, a former municipality in Wallonia
- Bohan sur Semois, a village in Wallonia, Belgium
- Mohan, Yunnan (simplified Chinese: 磨憨; Tai Lue: Bo Han), a border town in Mengla County, Yunnan, China

== Other ==
- Bohán, a native people of South America who lived in modern-day Uruguay along the Uruguay River
- A fictional island, based on the Bronx, in the video game Grand Theft Auto IV
