= William Boyle =

William Boyle may refer to:

- William Boyle (Irish writer) (1853–1923), Irish dramatist and short-story writer
- William Boyle (piper) (died c. 1888), Irish piper
- William Boyle, 12th Earl of Cork (1873–1967), Royal Navy officer
- William M. Boyle (1903–1961), American Democratic political activist from Kansas
- William George Boyle (1830–1908), British soldier and politician
- William James Boyle (1887–1971), political figure in Saskatchewan
- William Michael Boyle (born 1978), American author
- W. A. Boyle (1904–1985), president of the United Mine Workers of America union, 1963–1972
- William Lewis Boyle (1859–1918), British Member of Parliament for Mid Norfolk, 1910–1918
- Will Boyle (born 1995), English footballer for Cheltenham Town

== See also ==
- Billy Boyle, actor on British children's television
