= Owen Bohan =

Irish piper (fl. 1850s)

Owen Bohan (fl. 1850s) was an Irish piper.

A native of Clonbur, County Galway, Owen and his brother, Patrick R. Bohan, were famed pipers. Nicholas Burke, who heard them perform in his boyhood, said "They had a great name as Irish pipers." The piper Richard Stephenson is known to have studied under the brothers.

Unlike most Irish pipers and musicians, neither of the Bohans was lame, blind, or in any way infirm. But they enjoyed travelling, all over Ireland and England, with Liverpool being an especial destination.

Owen appears to have settled in either Dublin or Liverpool, and no further details of his life are known.

== See also ==
- Paddy Conneely (died 1851)
- Martin O'Reilly (1829-1904)
