= William Boyle (piper) =

William Boyle (died c. 1888?) was an Irish piper.

Boyle was a native of the town of Galway, "a fine general player on the Irish pipes and was equally proficient on the fiddle. Caring little for travel, he never went far from home until he came to America" about the year 1885 or 1886, "being then well advanced in years."

Following a short stay in New York City, Boyle settled in Newark, New Jersey, where he kept a dance hall. When Owen Cunnigam was in Newark, "they would play together at balls and parties and other entertainments."

Boyle had learned pipe music from Michael Touhey of Loughrea, grandfather of Patsy Touhey. His own father was a piper too, and kept a dance house in Galway town. Boyle himself died in Newark.

== See also ==
- Paddy Conneely (died 1851)
- Martin O'Reilly (1829–1904)
