= Beaver hat =

Hat made of beaver fur felt

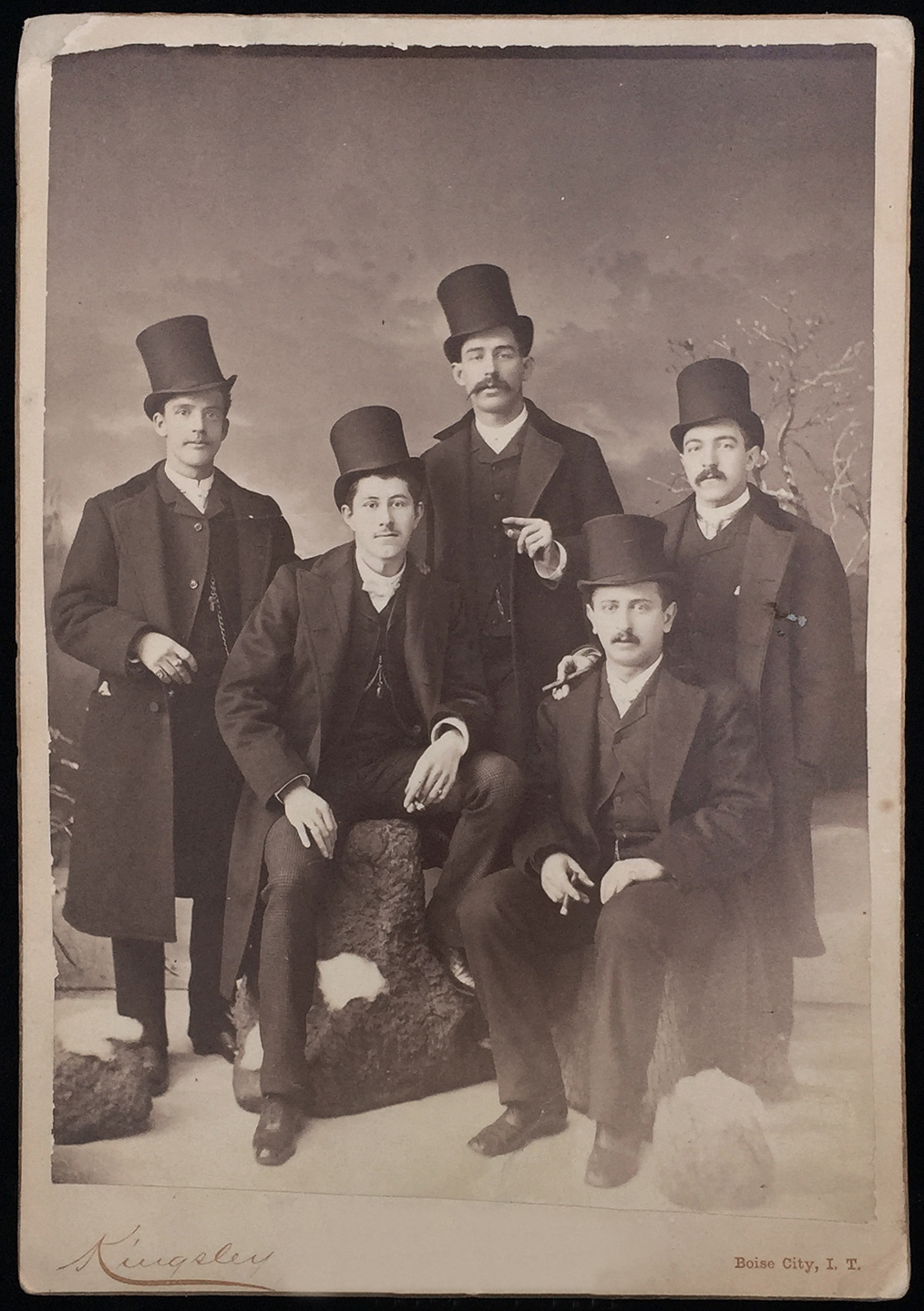
1886 cabinet card photograph of men in beaver hats

A beaver hat is a hat made from felted beaver fur. They were fashionable across much of Europe during the period 1550–1850 because the soft yet resilient material could be easily combed to make a variety of hat shapes (including the familiar top hat). Smaller hats made of beaver were sometimes called beaverkins, as in Thomas Carlyle's description of his wife as a child.

Used winter coats worn by Native Americans were a prized commodity for hat making because their wear helped prepare the skins, separating out the coarser hairs from the pelts. Additionally, trappers would most often obtain the beaver during winter when its coat was more dense and thus warmer compared to summer months.

To make felt, the underhairs were shaved from the beaver pelt and mixed with a vibrating hatter's bow. The matted fabric was pummeled and boiled repeatedly, resulting in a shrunken and thickened felt. Filled over a hat-form block, the felt was pressed and steamed into shape. The hat maker then brushed the outside surface to a sheen.

Evidence of felted beaver hats in western Europe can be found in Chaucer's Canterbury Tales, written in the late 14th century: "A Merchant was there with a forked beard / In motley, and high on his horse he sat, / Upon his head a Flandrish [Flemish] beaver hat." Demand for beaver fur led to the near-extinction of the Eurasian beaver and the North American beaver in succession. It seems likely that only a sudden change in style saved the beaver.

Beaver hats were made in various styles as a matter of civil status:

- the Wellington (1820–40)
- the Paris beau (1815)
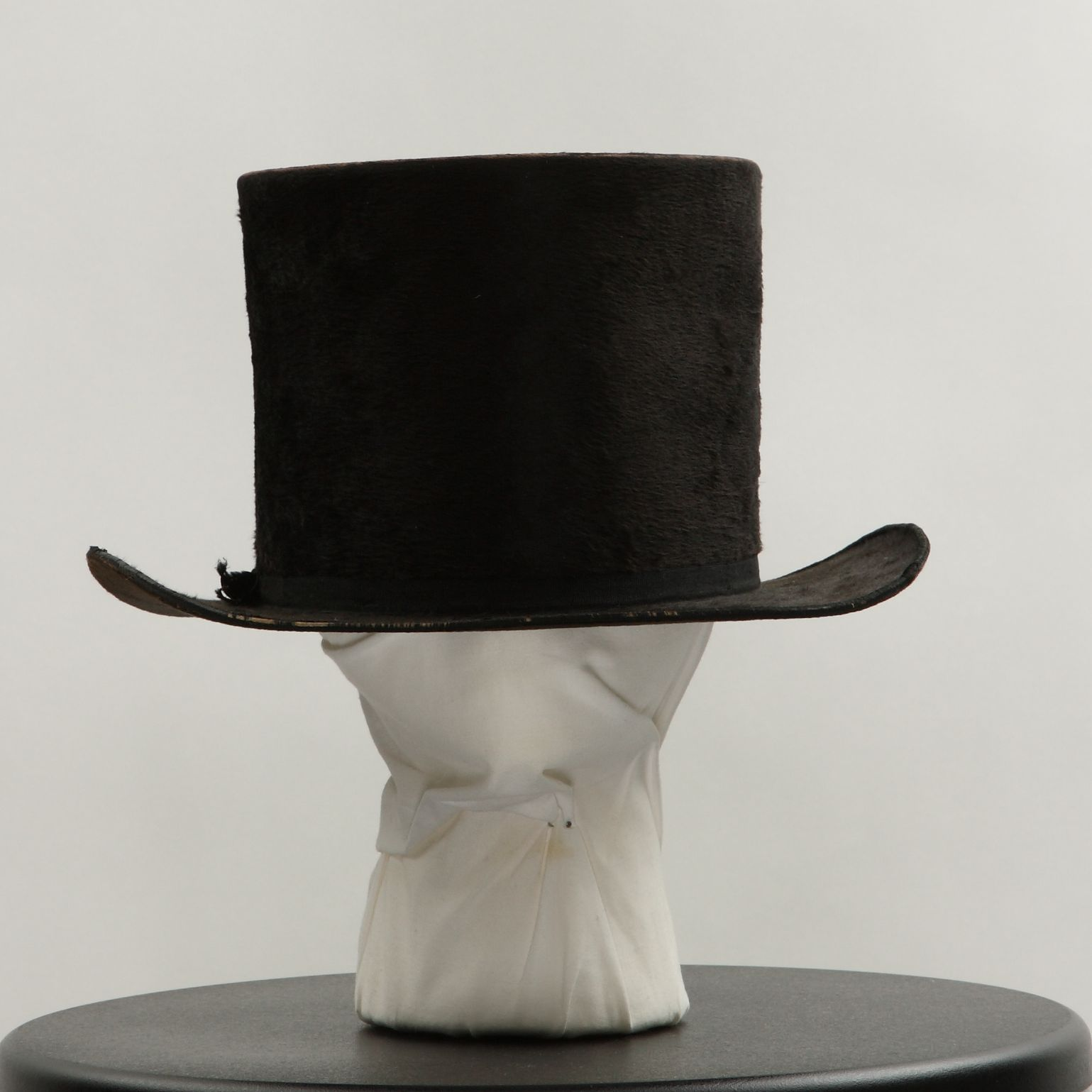
- Black beaver hat with high, straight-sided, flat-topped, oval-shaped crown; flat narrow brim up-turned slightly at sides; narrow (1/2" wide) black cross-grain ribbon encircles base of crown, tied in small bow at side; tan felt-lined sides; crown top lined with red and black checked paper; royal blue shield-shaped paper, label marked "PARIS" glued to center of paper lining; approx. 4 1/2" width of sides extending from top lined with red and black plaid paper; edges of brim and crown frayed and worn, 3" long tear in paper lining sides; - Worn by Benedict Macy (1819–1910)
  the D'Orsay (1820)
- the Regent (1825)
- the clerical (18th century).

In addition, beaver hats were made in various styles as a matter of military status:

- the continental cocked hat (1776)
- Navy cocked hat (19th century)
- the Army shako (1837).

The popularity of the beaver hat declined in the early/mid-19th century as silk hats became more fashionable across Europe.

== Castor and demicastor hats ==
Early modern records refer to "castor" and "demicastor" hats, derived from the French and Latin word for beaver, "castor". Demicastor was a felt made from beaver, rabbit fur, and wool. Beaver fur was obtained from Russia and the Baltic. In 17th-century American fur became available and was promoted by the Virginia Company.

In Scotland, Anne of Denmark gave a castor hat to her husband James VI as a New Year's Day gift in January 1591. She also gave castor hats to her servants, including the secretary Calixtus Schein. James VI played cards with the Duke of Lennox for the stake of a new "black castor hat lined with velvet". In April 1665, a Sussex vicar recorded his purchase of a "shaggy demicastor hat of the fashion".

== Carroting ==
"Carroting" was a chemical treatment —that contained poisonous ingredients such as mercury— that assisted greatly in the felting process. The history of the process was considered a “trade secret” and thus many people used different ratios or recipes to make their carroting solution. Carroting allowed the beaver fur to be felted so tightly that it was the only material that would allow a wide and durable rim.

This process made it possible to make quality hats out of low quality furs such as hare—which are domestic but difficult to felt without the chemical process.

Through the use of mercury in the carroting process, the heavy metal would eventually enter the blood system of the hatters leading to the term "mad as a hatter."

== In Judaism ==
A Biberhut or Bieber Hit (Biber is the German word for beaver) is a hat worn by some Ashkenazi Jewish men, mainly members of Hasidic Judaism. Two variations exist; the Flache (flat) Bieber Hat, which is mainly worn by adherents of Satmar Hasidim and some Yerushalmi Jews, and the Hoiche (tall) Bieber Hat also referred to as the Polish Hat, worn by most other Hasidic Jews.

== Gallery ==
Examples

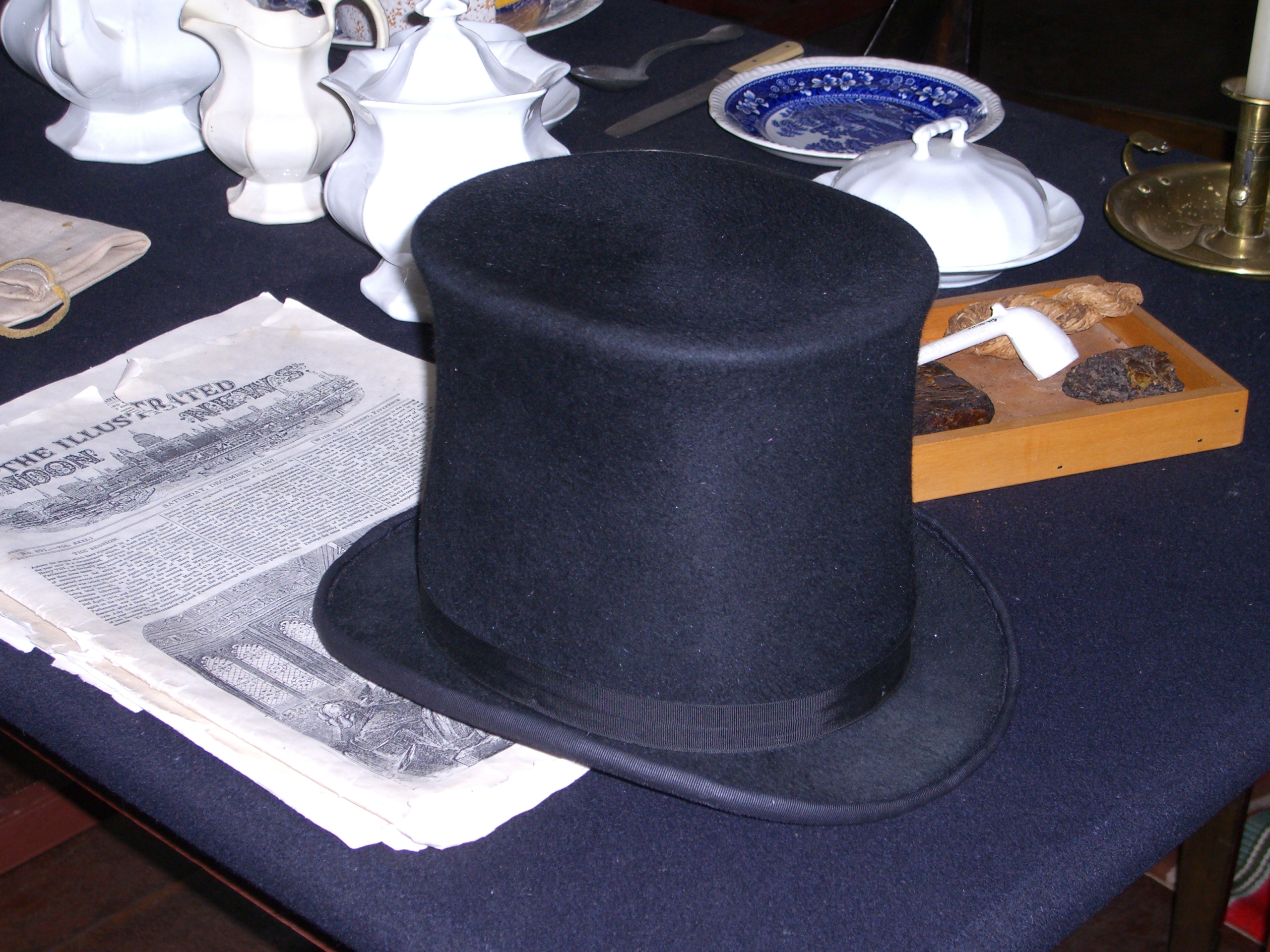
A silk reproduction felt hat, Lower Fort Garry NHS

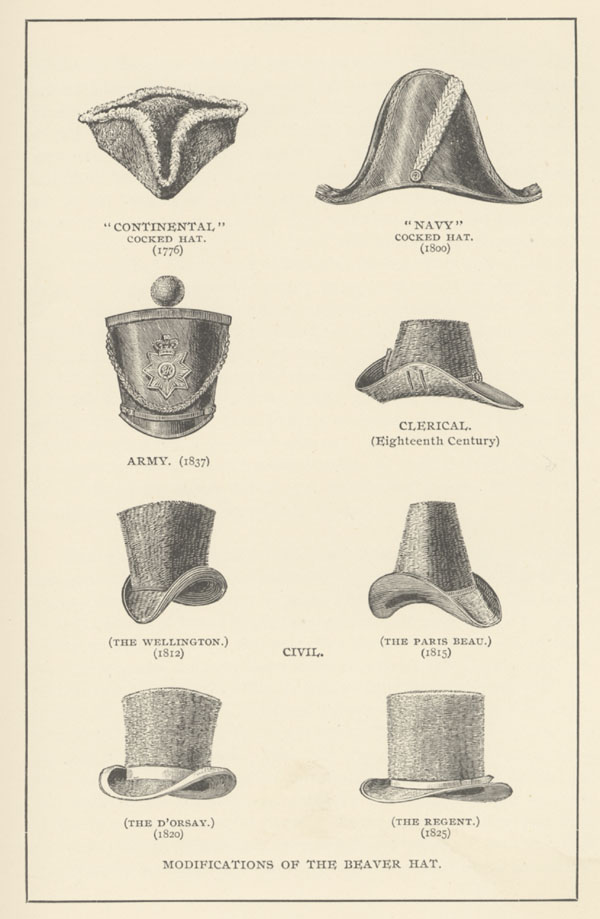
Shapes and styles of beaver hat 1776–1825

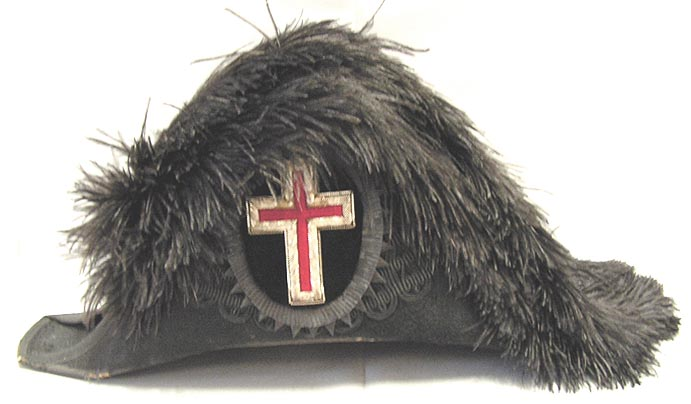
19th century Masonic Knights Templar Beaver Fur hat

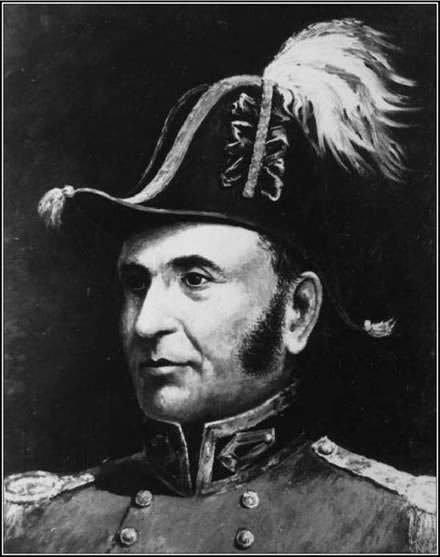
English military engineer John By (1779–1836)

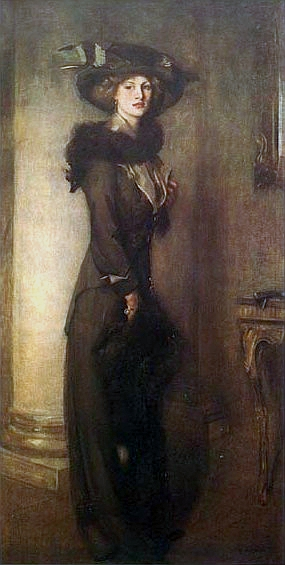
Edward Arthur Walton – The Beaver Hat

== See also ==
- List of hat styles
- List of fur headgear
