= Calixtus Schein (secretary) =

Calixtus Schein was a Danish secretary serving Anne of Denmark in Scotland in the 1590s.

== Career ==
Schein brought letters from the Danish court to Elizabeth I in June 1587, and was given a gold chain.

Schein served as a secretary in the household of Anne of Denmark from 1589, and was given silk livery clothes before leaving Denmark. His name was recorded as "Johannes Calixtus" in a list of the household made in 1590. His salary was £400 Scots annually. The Queen-Consort's other secretary was the poet William Fowler, and their junior colleague was John Geddie.

A wardrobe account includes clothes for Schein. His doublet and breeches of fine three-pile velvet, taffeta cloak, and "castour" hat was the most expensive costume bought for any of Anne's servants.

Calixtus and Anne wrote to Christian IV of Denmark for permission for him to leave Scotland in August 1593.

Another contemporary called "Calixtus Schein" was a magistrate in Lübeck.
