= Peter Kelly (piper) =

Peter Kelly (1837 – 1 April 1910) was an Irish piper. Kelly was born in the town of Galway but blinded in infancy. When old enough, his parents saw to it that he was taught the pipes by Martin O'Reilly as a means of ensuing his welfare. When aged about thirty he moved to Glasgow with fiddler John Crockwell, where he married and had nine children. He was survived upon his death by his widow and three children.

O'Neill said of him:

"This ideal old minstrel was a well-known figure for many years in the vicinity of the Jamaica and Albert bridges, and opposite the Queen Street Station, but instead of sitting down while playing he stood upright, resting his right leg above the knee on a short crotched stick so as to manipulate his instrument successfully. He had the reputation of being a particularly skilful and sweet player, and Mr. Henderson, the famous bagpipe maker who made his reeds, speaks in very high terms of his capabilities as a musician. Kelly played all his music by ear, and so quick was he in picking up a tune, that if he heard it played, sung, or whistled once, he could repeat it on the pipes without making a mistake. His favorite melodies were The Coolin and The Blackbird"

"Very often he was accompanied by another blind man named Smith, who played the flute, and the two were looked upon as inseparable cronies, and both were equally fond of their pint of porter, though by no means drunkards. Kelly was at his usual stand on the Albert bridge on the Saturday evening preceding his death from pneumonia four days later."

"Dire want drove his widow to a pawnshop with the pipes shortly after, and the generous ( ?) pawnbroker said, had not the chanter been worn nearly through by the finger marks he could afford to have given much more than the ten shillings he allowed her."
