= John Geddie (secretary) =

- Born: fl. 1575–1605
- Occupation: Secretary to Anne of Denmark

John Geddie (fl. 1575–1605) was a secretary to Anne of Denmark, queen of Scotland.

== Career ==
Geddie was a graduate of St Leonard's College at the University of St Andrews, and according to Scottish custom his name was usually written "Mr John Geddie". He was praised by contemporaries for his skills in calligraphy, and received a royal pension by privy seal letter in 1577 for making manuscripts of the works of George Buchanan. The annual gift of £20 Scots described him as Buchanan's servitor or servant. In November 1577 Geddie and the St Andrews mathematics regent William Welwood, were given a patent for their invention of a new method of extracting water from coal mines. In 1588, James VI gave him a gift of 20 French gold crowns, and a further £200 in October.

After his return to Scotland from some years of study in France, Geddie composed and calligraphed an excepionally beautiful Latin treatise on arithmetic dedicated to King James, dated at St Andrews, 5 September 1586. The manuscript features Geddie's own five-fold acrostic on "Iacobus Divina G[ratia] Scotorum R[ex]" as well as a poem composed in Geddie's honour by François Baudouin, sieur de l'Oaille, a judges in La Rochelle. A double acrostic poem linking the two men's names survives in the Fowler papers amongst the Hawthornden manuscripts in the National Library of Scotland.

In May 1590 he was given £180 for clothes to wear at the coronation of Anne of Denmark. He served as a secretary in the household of Anne of Denmark from 1591, junior in rank to her other secretaries Calixtus Schein and the poet William Fowler. The queen bought him clothes, including a fine black velvet doublet and breeches.

In 1590 he was secretary to an embassy to Denmark led by John Skene and Colonel William Stewart. First they went to London and Skene sent Geddie to William Cecil to arrange their audience with Elizabeth. Geddie left Helsingør on 30 August with letters for John Maitland, Robert Bowes and Skene's wife, Helen Somerville.

In December 1591 Geddie discussed letters from Spain sent to Sir John Seton of Barns with the English courtier Roger Aston. In January the English ambassador Robert Bowes asked Geddie to investigate and inform him of Spanish and Catholic intrigues at court, working with Roger Aston. In Bowes' opinion, Geddie was "honest, wise, and in great credit with all the king's secret seals", and would accept a gratuity like others in English pay.

Bowes mentioned that Geddie had carried a warning to the king from the rebel Earl of Bothwell in November 1592, which was false, and an attempt to incriminate Lord John Hamilton.

Geddie lost royal favour in 1594 apparently for losing a comprising document that suggested James VI was negotiating with Spain. These papers came in to the hands of Robert Bowes.

Geddie is associated with an early view of the town of St Andrews, and the musical part-books compiled by Thomas Wode, who mentioned that Geddie had promised to contribute a drawing of the royal arms.

In July 1605 King James sent his unpublished manuscript Historie of the Churche to Robert Cecil, 1st Earl of Salisbury. James had composed the work at Dalkeith Palace in the 1580s. This manuscript however had been written by Patrick Young following a copy made by John Geddie. James apologised that the language of this copy had been corrupted first by the version of Scots used by Geddie, and by Patrick Young's attempts to convert the text into English spelling. He joked that the result was like the Welsh spoken by the courtier Roger Aston, who was from Cheshire.
