= Catherine Bohan =

Irish swimmer

Personal information
- Born: 18 April 1964 (age 62)

Sport
- Sport: Swimming

Catherine Bohan (born 18 April 1964) is an Irish swimmer. She competed in three events at the 1980 Summer Olympics.
