= Donell Dubh Ó Cathail =

Irish harpist (c.1580–c.1660)

- Also known as: Daniel Duff O'Cahill
- Born: County Cork, Ireland
- Occupations: Harpist, possibly to a royal court
- Instrument: Harp

Donell Dubh Ó Cathail [Daniel Duff O'Cahill] (c.1580–c.1660) was an Irish musician, a performer on the Irish harp.

== Family ==
Ó Cathail was the son of a Cormac Ó Cathail, and a nephew or close relative of the Donell Óge Ó Cathail, harper to Elizabeth I. Harping seems to have been the family profession.

The family may not have been native to County Cork, as Ó Cathail is the name of unrelated families which originated separately in Galway, Clare, Kerry, Tipperary and Ulster.

His wife was Ellen (alive 1664), daughter of Charles MacCarthy and a granddaughter of Richard Barry of Ballinaltig. His known children were:

- David Óg (1586–1604), who had a son, David fitz David Ó Cathail, born 10 March 1605. The child's mother was Ellis, daughter of Richard, Lord Poer.
- James (died 1609)
- Ellen, married Garret fitz John Barry of Leamlara; their descendants were still extant in the 1900s.
- Lodowick, fl. 1621-c.1654.
- Daniel Óge, fl. 1635–1663.
- Richard, fl. 1637.
- Michael, a minor in the 1650s, alive in the 1690s.

== Employments ==
Ó Cathail had a number of successive employments as a household or court harper in Ireland and England. He probably commenced his career in the service of David de Barry, 5th Viscount Buttevant at Barryscourt Castle.

He spent the years 1607 to 1642 in England. Between 1607 and 1619 he was harper to Anne of Denmark, wife of the English king James I in London. A courtier, Gerrard Herbert, described entertainments for a French ambassador at Whitehall Palace on 20 May 1619, after Anne of Denmark's death. The party moved from the Great Hall to the Queen's Privy Chamber, where they heard the late Queen's French musicians sing, and in the Queen's bedchamber the Irish harp, a viol, and Mr Lanier singing and playing on the lute.

Ó Cathail was subsequently employed Henrietta Maria, wife of Charles I, between 1629 and 1642.

From his income and pensions he was able to buy land in County Cork and parts of the province of Connacht, to where he returned to retire.

== See also ==
- Cormac MacDermott (?–1618), harper and composer
- Ruaidri Dáll Ó Catháin (fl. late 16th/early 17th century), harper and composer
- Donnchadh Ó Hámsaigh (1695–1807), Irish harper

== Bibliography ==
- Seán Donnelly: "A Cork Musician at the Early Stuart Court: Daniel Duff O'Cahill (c.1580-c.1660), 'The Queen's Harper'", in Journal of the Cork Historical and Archaeological Society, vol. 105 (2000), pp. 1–26.
- Ann Buckley: "Music in Ireland to c.1500", in A New History of Ireland, vol. 1, ed. by Dáibhí Ó Cróinín (Oxford, 2005), pp. 744–813.
