= Anne of Denmark =

Queen of Scotland (1589–1619); Queen of England and Ireland (1603–1619)

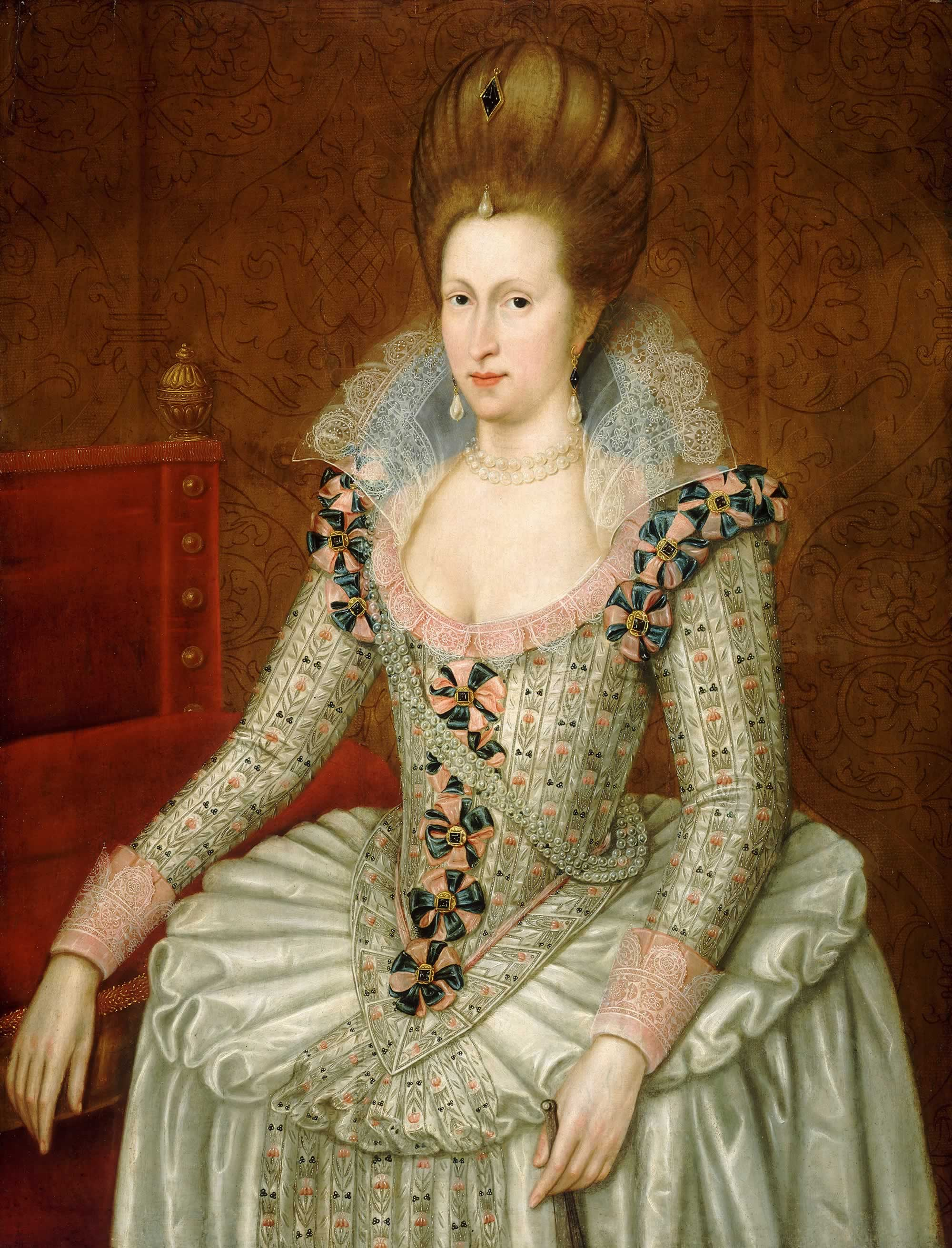
- 1605 portrait

Queen consort of England and Ireland
- Tenure: 24 March 1603 – 2 March 1619
- Coronation: 25 July 1603

Queen consort of Scotland
- Tenure: 20 August 1589 – 2 March 1619
- Coronation: 17 May 1590
- Born: 12 December 1574; Skanderborg Castle, Skanderborg, Denmark
- Died: 2 March 1619 (aged 44); Hampton Court Palace, Middlesex, England
- Burial: 13 May 1619; Westminster Abbey, London, England
- Spouse: James VI and I (m. 1589)
- Issue Detail: Henry Frederick, Prince of Wales; Elizabeth, Queen of Bohemia; Margaret; Charles I, King of England; Robert, Duke of Kintyre and Lorne; Mary; Sophia
- House: Oldenburg
- Father: Frederick II of Denmark
- Mother: Sophie of Mecklenburg-Güstrow

Anne of Denmark (Danish: Anna; 12 December 1574 – 2 March 1619) was Queen of Scotland from her marriage to King James VI on 20 August 1589, and Queen of England and Ireland from the union of the Scottish and English Crowns on 24 March 1603, until her death in 1619.

The second daughter of King Frederick II of Denmark and Sophie of Mecklenburg-Güstrow, Anne married James at age 14. They had three children who survived infancy: Henry Frederick, Prince of Wales, who predeceased his parents; Princess Elizabeth, who became Queen of Bohemia; and James's future successor, Charles I. Anne demonstrated an independent streak and a willingness to use factional Scottish politics in her conflicts with James over the custody of Prince Henry and his treatment of her friend Beatrix Ruthven. Anne appears to have loved James at first, but the couple gradually drifted and eventually lived apart, though mutual respect and a degree of affection survived.

In England, Anne shifted her energies from factional politics to patronage of the arts and constructed her own magnificent court, hosting one of the richest cultural salons in Europe. After 1612, she had sustained bouts of ill health and gradually withdrew from the centre of court life. Though she was reported to have been a Protestant at the time of her death, she may have converted to Catholicism at some point. (Note: The Archbishop of Canterbury reported that she had died rejecting Catholic notions. "But, then," cautions historian John Leeds Barroll, "we are all familiar with the modern 'press release'. In Anna's day, too, there was much to be said for promulgating an official version of England's queen dying 'respectably'." A letter from Anne to Scipione Borghese of 31 July 1601 is "open in its embrace of Catholicism.")

Some historians have dismissed Anne as frivolous and self-indulgent. However, 18th-century writers including Thomas Birch and William Guthrie considered her a woman of "boundless intrigue". Recent reappraisals acknowledge Anne's assertive independence and, in particular, her dynamic significance as a patron of the arts during the Jacobean age. (Note: "She quickly moved vigorously into court politics, an aspect of her new life not foregrounded by her few biographers ... she soon became a political presence at the Scottish court." "Though she has been accorded insufficient attention by historians, James's Queen, Anne of Denmark, was politically astute and active." "This new king's influence on the high culture of the Stuart period, although considerable in certain discrete areas, has been misunderstood in terms of innovations at the court itself ... during the first decade of his reign, these innovations were fundamentally shaped by James's much neglected queen consort, Anna of Denmark.")

== Early life ==
Anne was born on 12 December 1574 at the castle of Skanderborg on the Jutland Peninsula in the Kingdom of Denmark to Sophie of Mecklenburg-Güstrow and King Frederick II of Denmark. In need of a male heir the King had been hoping for a son, and Sophie gave birth to a son, Christian, three years later.

With her older sister, Elizabeth, Anne was sent to be raised at Güstrow by her maternal grandparents, the Duke and Duchess of Mecklenburg. Christian was also sent to be brought up at Güstrow but two years later, in 1579, his father the King wrote to his parents-in-law, to request the return of his sons, Christian and Ulrich, (probably, at the urging of the Rigsråd, the Danish Privy Council), and Anne and Elizabeth returned with him.

Anne enjoyed a close, happy family upbringing in Denmark, thanks largely to Queen Sophie, who nursed the children through their illnesses herself. (Note: The English agent Daniel Rogers reported to William Cecil that Sophie was "a right virtuous and godly Princess which with motherly care and great wisdom ruleth her children.") Suitors from all over Europe sought the hands of Anne and Elizabeth in marriage, including James VI of Scotland, who favoured Denmark as a kingdom reformed in religion and a profitable trading partner.

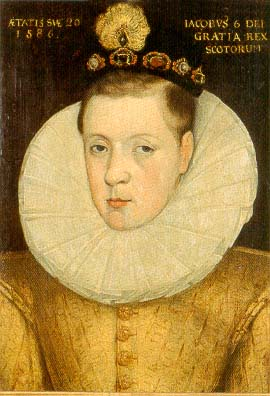
James VI in 1586, aged twenty, three years before his marriage to Anne

James's other serious possibility, though eight years his senior, was Catherine, sister of the Huguenot King Henry III of Navarre (future Henry IV of France), who was favoured by Elizabeth I of England. One reason James set this option aside was Henry's hard requirement for military assistance. Scottish ambassadors in Denmark first concentrated their suit on the oldest daughter, but Frederick betrothed Elizabeth to Henry Julius, Duke of Brunswick, promising the Scots instead that "for the second [daughter] Anna, if the King did like her, he should have her."

=== Betrothal and proxy marriage ===
The constitutional position of Sophie, Anne's mother, became difficult after Frederick's death in 1588, (Note: The clergyman observed at Frederick's funeral service that "had the King drunk a little less, he might have lived many a day yet.") when she found herself in a power struggle with the Rigsraad for control of her son King Christian IV. As a matchmaker, however, Sophie proved more diligent than Frederick and, overcoming sticking points on the amount of the dowry and the status of Orkney, (Note: The Orkney Islands had been a provisional part of the dowry of Margaret of Denmark on her marriage to James III of Scotland in 1469, returnable to Denmark upon full payment of the dowry.) she sealed the agreement by July 1589. (Note: The Danes waived their claim to Orkney, and James, declaring he would not be a merchant for his bride, dropped his demand for an excessive dowry.) Anne herself seems to have been thrilled with the match. On 28 July 1589, the English spy Thomas Fowler reported that Anne was "so far in love with the King's Majesty as it were death to her to have it broken off and hath made good proof divers ways of her affection which his Majestie is apt enough to requite." Fowler's insinuation, that James preferred men to women, (Note: "All his life, except perhaps for six short months, King James disliked women, regarding them as inferior beings. All his interest was centred on the attractions of personable young men.") would have been hidden from the fourteen-year-old Anne, who devotedly embroidered shirts for her fiancé while 300 tailors worked on her wedding dress. (Note: There were other dresses: five hundred Danish tailors and embroiderers were said to have been at work for three months. A dress of peach and parrot-coloured damask with fishboned skirts lined with wreaths of pillows round the hips was especially admired.)

Whatever the truth of the rumours, James required a royal match to preserve the Stuart line. "God is my witness", he explained, "I could have abstained longer than the weal of my country could have permitted, [had not] my long delay bred in the breasts of many a great jealousy of my inability, as if I were a barren stock." He wrote to Sophie from Aberdeen that Anne's portrait had "fascinated our eyes and heart" and he had "no higher desire" than to behold her in person. On 20 August 1589, Anne was married by proxy to James at Kronborg Castle, the ceremony ending with a torchlit procession and James's representative, George Keith, 5th Earl Marischal, sitting next to Anne on the bridal bed.

=== Marriage ===
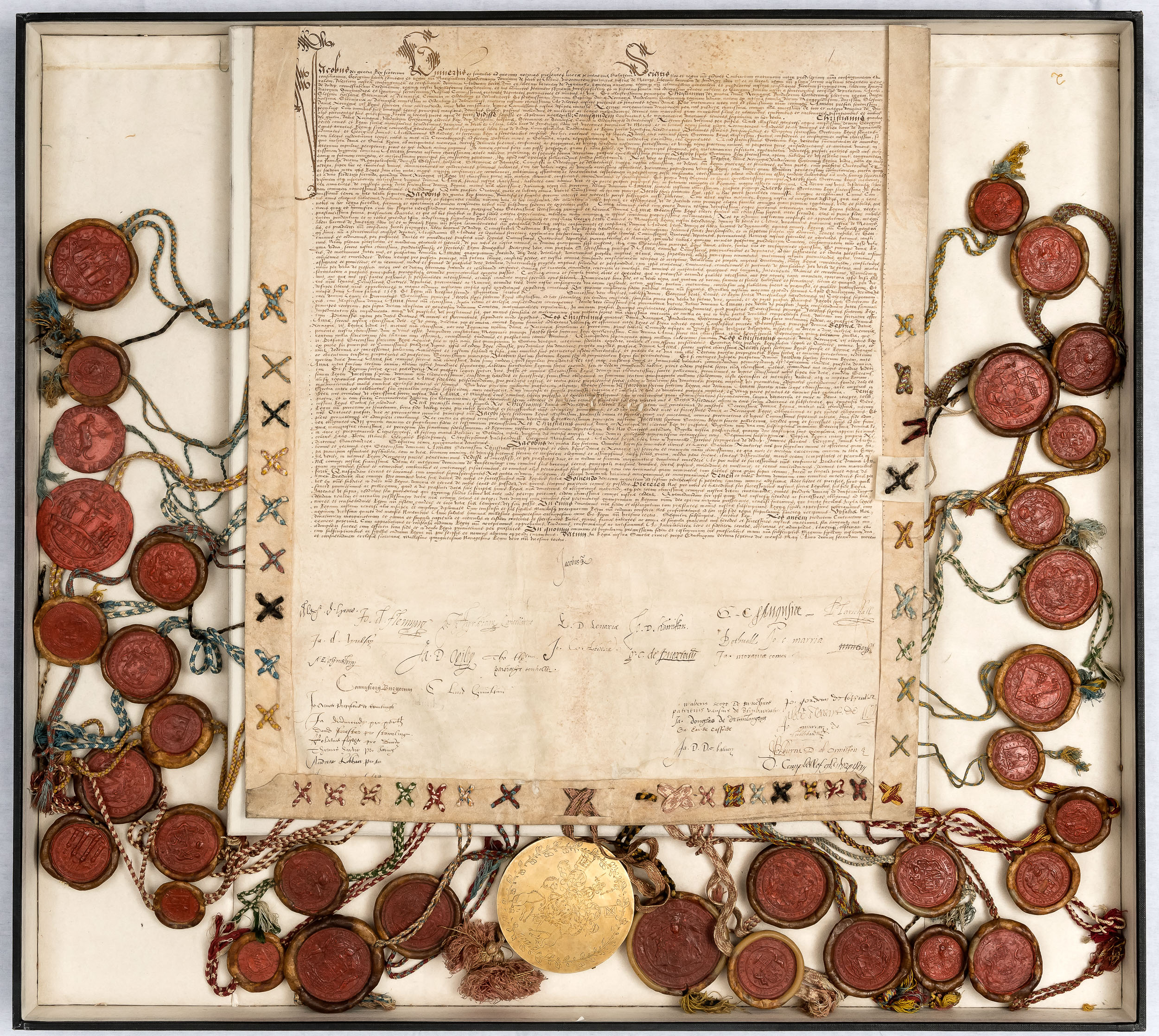
1589 marriage contract between Anne of Denmark and James VI

Anne set sail for Scotland within 10 days, but her fleet under the command of Admiral Peder Munk was beset by misadventures. At Elsinore a naval gun backfired, killing two gunners. The next day, a gun fired in tribute to two visiting Scottish noblemen exploded, killing one gunner and injuring 9 of the crew. Storms at sea then put the fleet in severe difficulties and one report had Anne's ship missing for three days. Two of the ships in the flotilla collided, killing two more sailors. Anne's ship, the Gideon, sprang a dangerous leak and put into Gammel Sellohe in Norway for repairs, but it leaked again after setting sail. The fleet then put in at Flekkerøy, by which time it was 1 October and the crews were unwilling to try again so late in the year. Anne was forced back to the coast of Norway, from where she travelled by land to Oslo for refuge, accompanied by the Earl Marischal and others of the Scottish and Danish embassies. (Note: The King of Denmark ruled both Denmark and Norway at this time.)

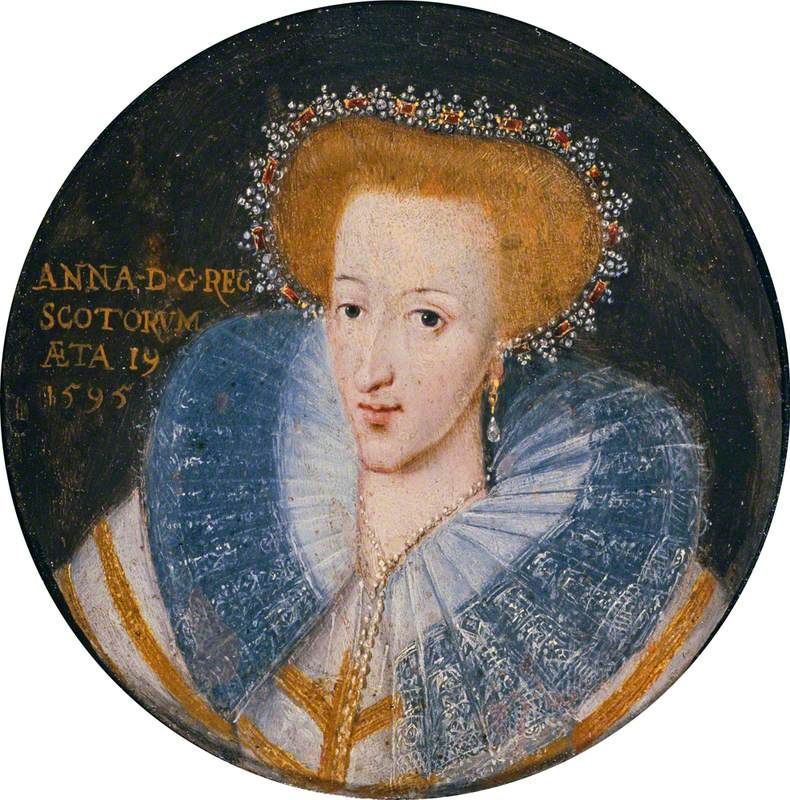
Anne of Denmark as Queen of Scotland, 1595, by Adrian Vanson

On 12 September Lord Dingwall had landed at Leith, reporting that "he had come in company with the Queen's fleet three hundred miles, and was separated from them by a great storm: it was feared that the Queen was in danger upon the seas." Alarmed, James called for national fasting and public prayers, and kept watch on the Firth of Forth for Anne's arrival from Seton Palace, the home of his friend Lord Seton. He wrote several songs, one comparing the situation to the plight of Hero and Leander, and sent a search party out for Anne, carrying a letter he had written to her in French: "Only to one who knows me as well as his own reflection in a glass could I express, my dearest love, the fears which I have experienced because of the contrary winds and violent storms since you embarked". Anne's letters arrived in October explaining that she had abandoned the crossing. She wrote, in French;

we have already put out to sea four or five times but have always been driven back to the harbours from which we sailed, thanks to contrary winds and other problems that arose at sea, which is the cause why, now Winter is hastening down on us, and fearing greater danger, all this company is forced to our regret, and to the regret and high displeasure of your men, to make no further attempt at present, but to defer the voyage until the Spring.

In what Willson calls "the one romantic episode of his life", James sailed from Leith with a three-hundred-strong retinue to fetch his wife personally. He arrived in Oslo on 19 November after travelling by land from Flekkefjord via Tønsberg. (Note: In one of the messages James left behind, he said he had decided on this action alone, to demonstrate that he was no "irresolute ass who could do nothing of himself". Williams points out that it was brave of James to cross the North Sea at that time of year in a 130-ton ship, and McManus notes that the gesture "startles commentators accustomed to the image of James as a timorous man.") According to a Scottish account, he presented himself to Anne, "with boots and all", and, disarming her protests, gave her a kiss, in the Scottish fashion. (Note: "His majesty minded to give the Queen a kiss after the Scots fashion at meeting, which she refused as not being the form of her country. Marry, after a few words spoken privately between His Majesty and her, there passed familiarity and kisses." McManus sees Anne's protests as an early sign of assertiveness. Willson distrusts Moysie's version and prefers a Danish narrative whereby James enters Oslo in state with heralds, observing the diplomatic niceties in full.)

Anne and James were formally married in hall of the Old Bishop's Palace in Oslo, then the house of Christen Mule, on 23 November 1589, "with all the splendour possible at that time and place." So that both bride and groom could understand, Leith minister David Lindsay conducted the ceremony in French, describing Anne as "a Princess both godly and beautiful ... she giveth great contentment to his Majesty." A month of celebrations followed; and on 22 December, cutting his entourage to 50, James visited his new relations at Kronborg Castle in Elsinore, where the newlyweds were greeted by Queen Sophie, 12 year-old King Christian IV, and Christian's four regents. Anne and James may have repeated their marriage ceremony at Kronborg, this time by Lutheran rites, on 21 January 1590. (Note: McManus regards this repeat ceremony as unsubstantiated.) The couple moved on to Copenhagen on 7 March and attended the wedding of Anne's older sister Elizabeth to Henry Julius, Duke of Brunswick on 19 April, sailing two days later for Scotland in a patched up "Gideon". They arrived in the Water of Leith on 1 May. After a welcoming speech in French by James Elphinstone, Anne stayed in the King's Wark and James went alone to hear a sermon by Patrick Galloway in the Parish Church. Five days later, Anne made her state entry into Edinburgh in a solid silver coach brought over from Denmark, James riding alongside on horseback.

=== Coronation ===
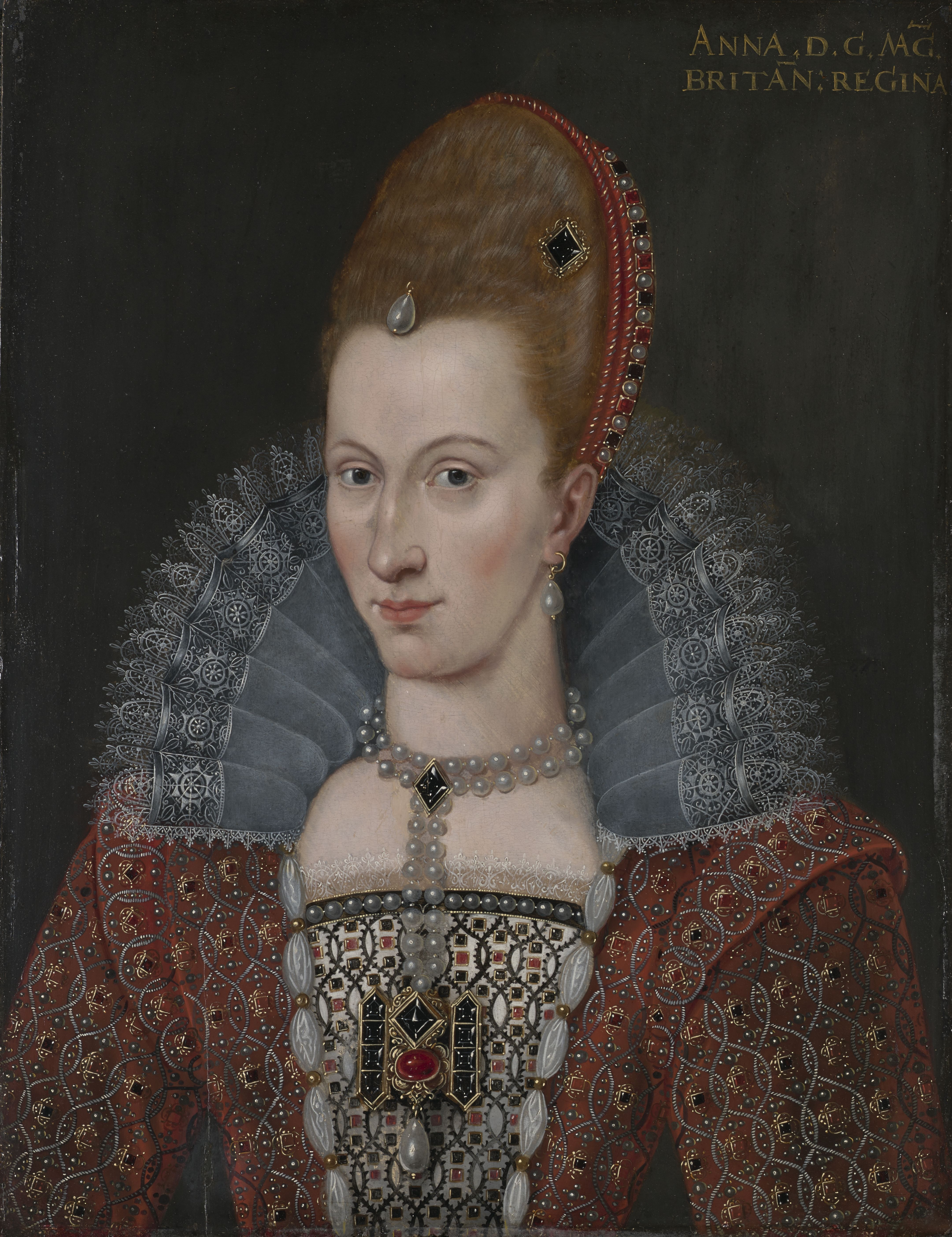
Anne of Denmark, c. 1600

Anne was crowned on 17 May 1590 in the Abbey Church at Holyrood, the first Protestant coronation in Scotland. During the seven-hour ceremony, her gown was opened by the Countess of Mar for presiding minister Robert Bruce to pour "a bonny quantity of oil" on "parts of her breast and arm", so anointing her as queen. (Kirk ministers had objected vehemently to this element of the ceremony as a pagan and Jewish ritual, but James insisted that it dated from the Old Testament.) The king handed the crown to Chancellor Maitland, who placed it on Anne's head. She then affirmed an oath to defend the true religion and worship of God and to "withstand and despise all papistical superstitions, and whatsoever ceremonies and rites contrary to the word of God".

When the Danish ambassadors left Scotland on 25 May 1590, James VI wrote a letter to the Lords Deputies of Council who ruled Denmark as guardians of Christian IV, with his resolve to "maintain perpetually and inviolably" the connection between the nations.

=== Household in Scotland ===
Anne brought servants and courtiers from Denmark, including the ladies-in-waiting and chamberers Katrine Skinkel, Anna Kaas, and Margaret Vinstarr, the preacher Johannes Sering, a page William Belo, and artisans such as goldsmith Jacob Kroger, the carpenter Frederick, her cooks Hans Poppilman and Marion, and her tailors. Her Danish secretary Calixtus Schein had two Scottish colleagues, William Fowler and John Geddie. The head of her first household was Wilhelm von der Wense. Servants from her home country provided familiarity and bridged a cultural divide.

At first, observers like William Dundas thought the queen led a solitary life, with few Scottish companions. Later in 1590 more Scottish noblewomen were appointed to serve her, including Marie Stewart, a daughter of Esmé Stewart, 1st Duke of Lennox, Margaret Wood, and members of the Ochiltree Stewart family. James invited Scottish lairds including Robert Mure of Caldwell to send gifts of hackney horses for the queen's ladies to ride. Anne bought her ladies and maidens of honour matching clothes and riding outfits, made by her Danish tailor Pål Rei and furrier Henrie Koss, and the Scottish tailors Peter Sanderson and Peter Rannald supervised by her master of Wardrobe, Søren Johnson. She had an African servant, noted in the accounts only as the "Moir", who was probably a "page of the equerry", attending her horse. He was dressed in orange velvet and Spanish taffeta. When he died at Falkland Palace in July 1591, James paid for his funeral. The German physician Martin Schöner attended Anne when she was ill or in childbed.

Two Danish favourites, Katrine Skinkel and Sofie Kass wore velvet hats with feathers to match the queen's, made by an older gentlewoman in the household, Elizabeth Gibb, the wife of the king's tutor Peter Young. Anne gave her ladies wedding gowns and trousseaux when they married, and even arranged a loan for the dowry of Jean, Lady Kennedy. When, in December 1592 the widower John Erskine, Earl of Mar married Marie Stewart, James VI and Anne of Denmark attended the celebrations at Alloa and there was a masque in costume in which Anne of Denmark performed. Materials for Anne's masque costumes included lightweight silks and ribbons and "plumages" of feathers. Her court musicians in Scotland included John Norlie, an English lutenist.

In 1593, Anne told the English ambassador Robert Bowes that she would like to meet Queen Elizabeth, and wanted to have a young English gentleman or maiden of "good parentage" join her household. Bowes passed this request to Cecil to consider. She made another overture of friendship to Elizabeth I in May 1595, asking for her portrait. There was no response and Bowes had to reiterate her request. Finally, in February 1596 Elizabeth condescended to grant Anne's "earnest desire" and send her a picture.

== Relationship with James ==
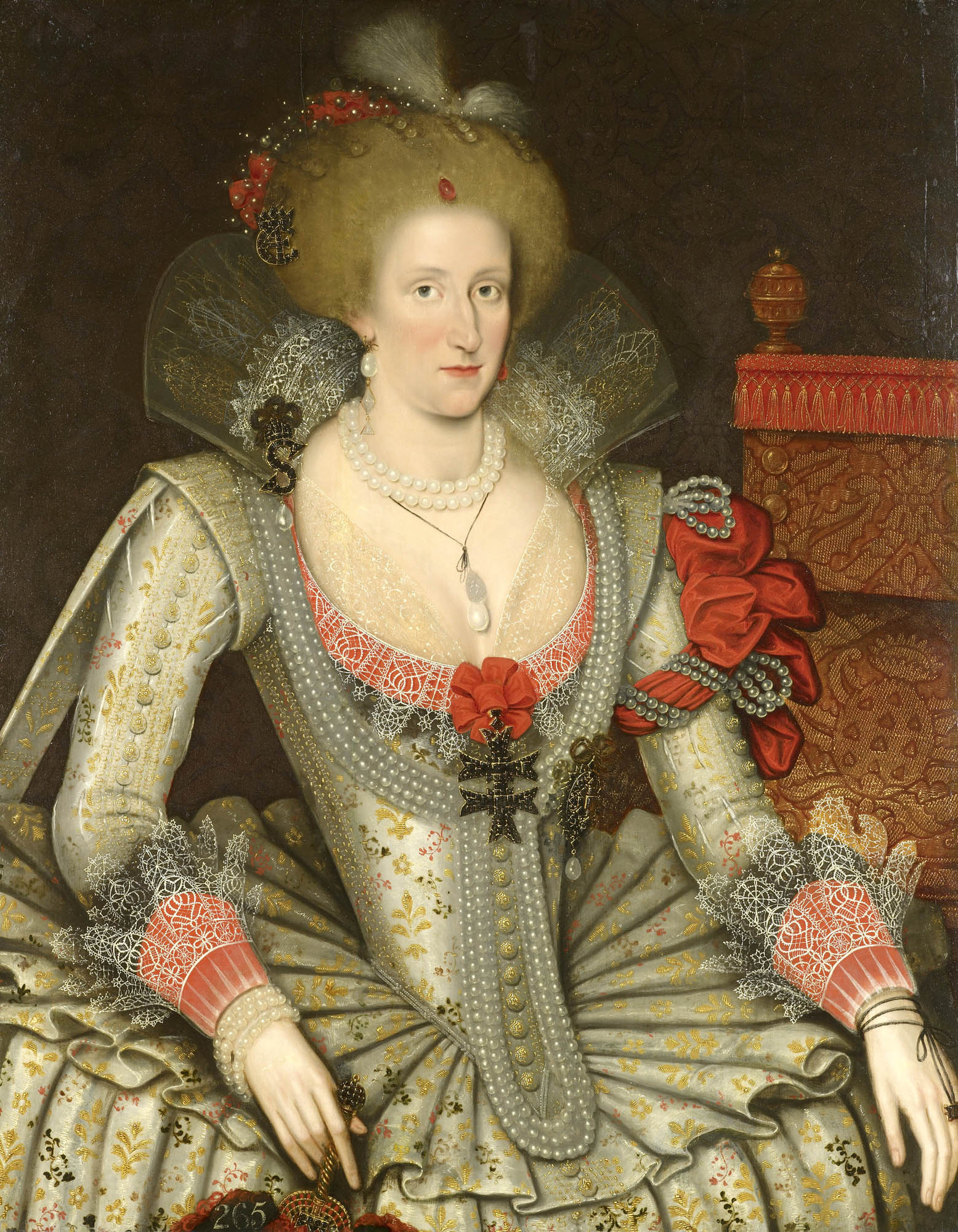
Anne of Denmark, c. 1614, by Marcus Gheeraerts the Younger

By all accounts, James was at first entranced by his bride, but his infatuation evaporated quickly and the couple often found themselves at loggerheads, though in the early years of their marriage James seems always to have treated Anne with patience and affection. James Melville of Halhill, a gentleman of her bedchamber, wrote that in Scotland Anne would intercede with James on behalf of honest courtiers, if she heard that he was stirred up against them by "wrong information" or slander.

In their first years of marriage, James VI and Anne of Denmark personally dressed in costume and took part in masques at the weddings of courtiers. These performances typically involved music, dance, and disguise. Between 1593 and 1595, James was romantically linked with Anne Murray, later Lady Glamis. He addressed her in verse as "my mistress and my love". Anne of Denmark herself was also occasionally the subject of scandalous rumours. In the Basilikon Doron, written 1597–1598, James described marriage as "the greatest earthly felicitie or miserie, that can come to a man".

From the first moment of the marriage, Anne was under pressure to provide James and Scotland with an heir. Even before Anne arrived in Scotland, rumours circulated that she was pregnant. but the passing of 1591 and 1592 with no sign of a pregnancy provoked renewed Presbyterian libels on the theme of James's fondness for male company and whispers against Anne "for that she proves not with child". When it was thought that she was pregnant, James tried to prevent her going horse riding but she refused. There was great public relief when on 19 February 1594 Anne gave birth to her first child, Henry Frederick. He was named after his two grandfathers, Henry Stuart, Lord Darnley, and King Frederick II of Denmark.

=== Custody of Prince Henry ===
Anne soon learned that she would have no say in her son's care. James appointed as head of the nursery his former nurse Helen Little, who installed Henry in James's own oak cradle. Most distressingly for Anne, James insisted on placing Prince Henry in the custody of John Erskine, Earl of Mar at Stirling Castle, in keeping with Scottish royal tradition. (Note: The Earls of Mar were the traditional custodians of the heirs to the Scottish throne.)

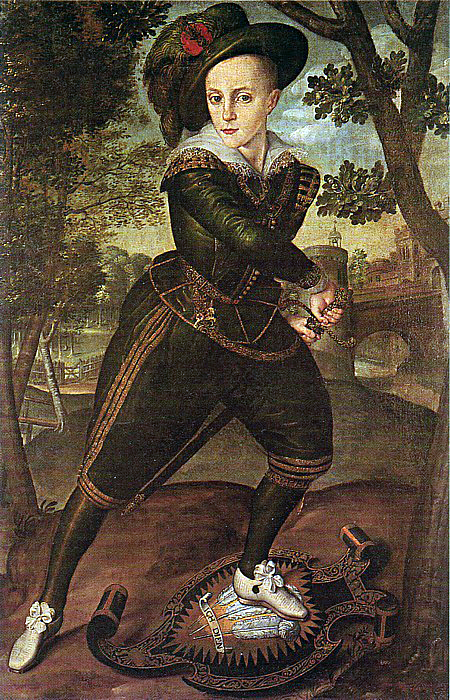
Prince Henry Stuart, c. 1608, by Robert Peake the Elder

In late 1594, she began a furious campaign for custody of Henry, recruiting a faction of supporters to her cause, including the chancellor, John Maitland of Thirlestane. (Note: Williams suggests that Maitland was playing a double game: though he shared Anne's enmity towards Mar, he secretly urged James not to give way to her.) Nervous of the lengths to which Anne might go, James formally charged Mar in writing never to surrender Henry to anyone except on orders from his own mouth, "because in the surety of my son consists my surety", nor to yield Henry to the Queen even in the event of his own death. "And in case God call me at any time see that neither for the Queen nor Estates, their pleasure, you deliver him till he be eighteen years of age, and that he command you himself." Anne demanded the matter be referred to the Council, but James would not hear of it. The issue remained unresolved and James went north after the Battle of Glenlivet. He wrote to Anne inviting her to join him as he tried to discover the whereabouts of rebel lords. She did not make the journey.

Anne made plans to make a progress to see the English border in May 1595, but James refused. The controversy over the custody of Prince Henry continued, with public scenes in which James reduced her to rage and tears over the issue. (Note: In May 1595 Anne desperately pleaded with James to be allowed custody of Henry, complaining that "it was an ill return to refuse her suit, founded on reason and nature, and to prefer giving the care of her babe to a subject who neither in rank nor deserving was the best his Majesty had." The King countered that "though he doubted nothing of her good intentions yet if some faction got strong enough, she could not hinder his boy being used against him, as he himself had been against his unfortunate mother.") Anne became so bitterly upset that in July 1595 she suffered a miscarriage. Thereafter, she outwardly abandoned her campaign, but it was thought permanent damage had been done to the marriage. In August 1595, John Colville wrote: "There is nothing but lurking hatred disguised with cunning dissimulation betwixt the King and the Queen, each intending by slight to overcome the other." Despite these differences, Anne and James visited the Prince at Stirling in December 1595 and returned to Holyrood Palace to celebrate her 21st birthday.

They had six more children. It was said, in May 1597, that Anne was "careful of no other thing, but to dance and sport". Anne extended and rebuilt Dunfermline Palace, in 1601 preparing a lodging for her daughter Princess Elizabeth, but the princess remained at Linlithgow Palace on the king's orders. Her younger sons Charles and Robert were allowed to stay with her at Dunfermline and Dalkeith Palace.

In February 1603, the French ambassador in London, Christophe de Harlay, Count of Beaumont, reported a rumour spread by James's friends that Anne was cruel and ambitious, hoping to rule Scotland as Regent or Governor for her son after her husband's death. Anne saw a belated opportunity to gain custody of Henry in 1603 when James left for London with the Earl of Mar to assume the English throne following the death of Elizabeth I. At his departure James made a tender public farewell to his wife. Pregnant at the time, Anne descended on Stirling with a force of "well-supported" nobles, intent on removing the nine-year-old Henry, whom she had hardly seen for five years; but Mar's wife and his young son would allow her to bring no more than two attendants with her into the castle. The obduracy of Henry's keepers sent Anne into such a fury that she suffered another miscarriage: according to David Calderwood, she "went to bed in anger and parted with child the tenth of May." (Note: Foreign commentators in London passed on rumours about the miscarriage: the Venetian ambassador reported that Anne had beaten her belly to induce it, the French Maximilien de Béthune, duc de Sully, that she had faked the miscarriage for political effect.)

When the Earl of Mar returned with James's instructions that Anne join him in the Kingdom of England, she informed James by letter that she refused to do so unless allowed custody of Henry. James's reply indicates that Anne had accused him of not loving her, of only marrying her because of her high birth, and of listening to rumours that she might turn Catholic: "I thank God," he wrote, "I carry that love and respect unto you which by the law of God and nature I ought to do my wife and mother of my children, but not for ye are a King's daughter, for whether ye were a King's or a cook's daughter ye must be all alike to me, being once my wife." And he swore "upon the peril of my salvation and damnation, that neither the Earl of Mar nor any flesh living ever informed me that ye was upon any papist or Spanish course." This "forceful maternal action", as historian Pauline Croft describes it, obliged James to climb down at last, though he reproved Anne for "froward womanly apprehensions" and described her behaviour in a letter to Mar as "wilfulness". Both Barroll and McManus point out that Anne's actions were political as well as maternal; Barroll and McManus elaborate diplomacy and politics went into the hand-over: the governing Council met at Stirling and banned Anne's noble attendants from coming within ten miles (16 km) of Henry; Mar delivered Henry to Ludovic Stewart, 2nd Duke of Lennox, representing the king; Lennox delivered him to the Council; the Council handed him over to Anne and Lennox, who were to take him south together. As the Queen travelled south, John Graham, 3rd Earl of Montrose, wrote to James urging him to exercise greater control over her: "But lest Her Highness' wrath continuing, should hereafter produce unexpected tortures, I would most humbly entreat Your Majesty to prevent the same ... and suffer not this canker or corruption to have any further progress."

James wrote to Anne that he had not received accusations from Mar's supporters that her actions at Stirling were motivated by religious factionalism or "Spanish courses". He reminded her that she was "a king's daughter" but "whether ye a king's or a cook's daughter, ye must be all alike to me, being once my wife", and so she should have respected the confidence he, her husband, had placed in Mar. The French ambassador in London, Maximilien de Béthune, Duke of Sully, heard that Anne would bring and exhibit her embalmed still-born male child in England in order to dispel false rumours about a plot.

=== Stirling to Windsor Castle ===
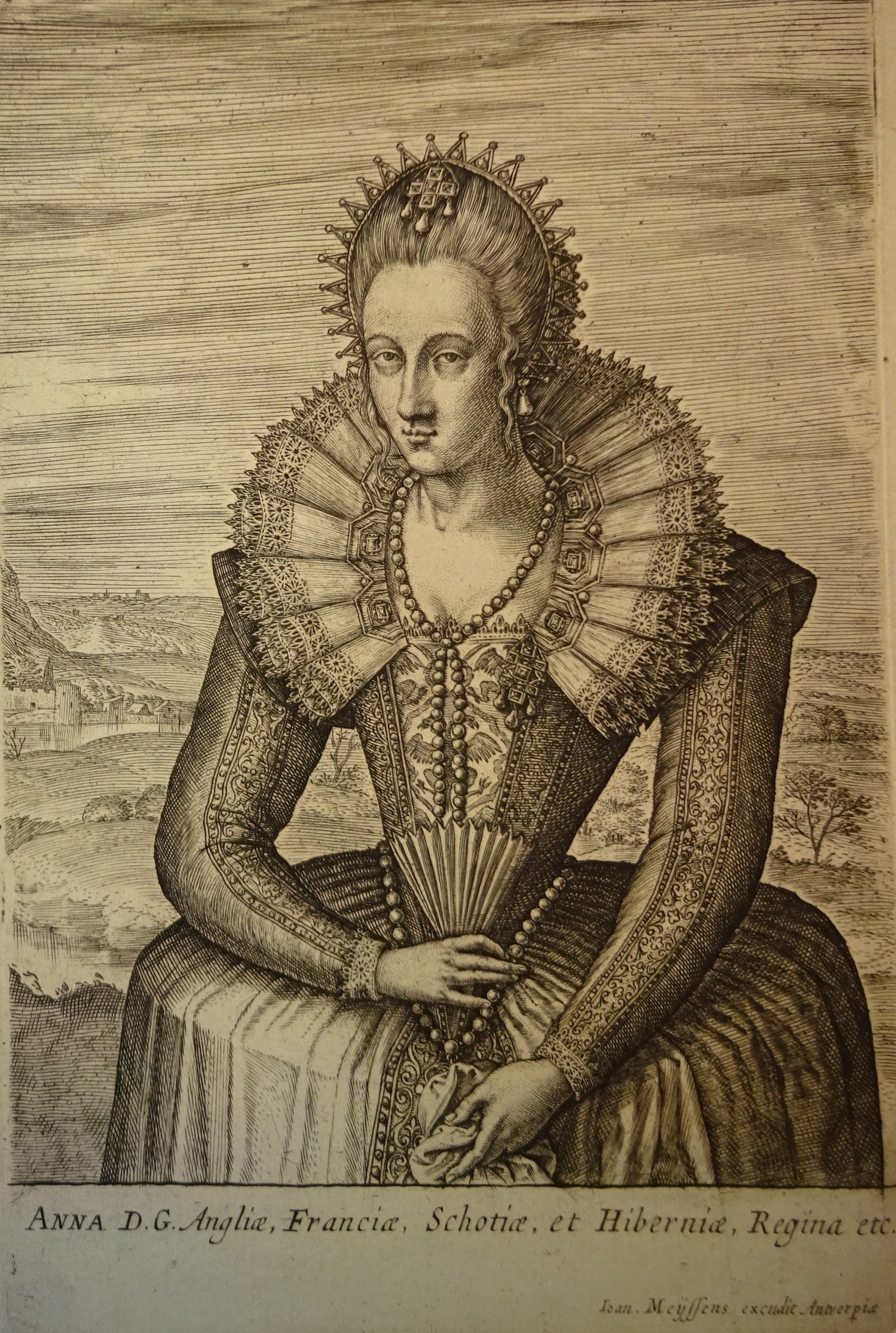
Anne of Denmark as Queen of England

Anne of Denmark's coat of arms. Depicting the Royal Coat of Arms of England, Scotland and Ireland impaled with her father's arms as King of Denmark. The shield is surmounted by a crown, and supported by a lion and a savage.

After a brief convalescence from the miscarriage, Anne travelled from Stirling to Edinburgh, where several English ladies had gathered, hoping to join her court, including Lucy Russell, Countess of Bedford, and Frances Howard, Countess of Kildare. Anne ordered a new gown of figured taffeta and had her white satin gown refashioned. New clothes were bought for her entourage, and her jester Tom Durie was given a green coat.

Marmaduke Darrell was sent from London with money for the expenses of her journey and the group of ladies sent by the Privy Council to attend her. Anne duly travelled south with Prince Henry, their progress causing a sensation in England. Princess Elizabeth followed two days later and soon caught up, but Prince Charles was left at Dunfermline, being sickly. Anne kept with her the body of the child she had miscarried.

She was met at York on 11 June by Thomas Cecil, Lord Burghley. He wrote to Sir Robert Cecil, "she will prove, if I be not deceived, a magnifical prince, a kind wife and a constant mistress". Her large crowd of followers was disorderly and there were quarrels between the Earl of Argyll and the Earl of Sussex, and between Thomas Somerset and William Murray who argued about the role of Master of Horse. The Duke of Lennox and the Earls of Shrewsbury and Cumberland made a proclamation at Worksop Manor that her followers should put aside any private quarrels, and hangers-on without formal roles should leave.

Courtiers and gentry made efforts to meet her on her journey. Lady Anne Clifford recorded that she and her mother killed three horses in their haste to see the Queen at Dingley. In the great hall at Windsor Castle, "there was such an infinite number of lords and ladies and so great a Court as I think I shall never see the like again." Lady Anne Clifford was thirteen years old at the time.

Anne and James were crowned at Westminster Abbey on 25 July 1603. The coronation prayers for Anne alluded to Esther, the Wise Virgins, and other Biblical heroines.

=== An English estate and income for the Queen ===
A council was appointed in 1593 by the Parliament of Scotland to look after her landed estates and income. Anne of Denmark's household expenses in Scotland were alleviated by money given to James VI by Elizabeth I. Between July 1591 and September 1594, she received £18,796 Scots. At the end of December 1595, the Queen's council, re-appointed as a financial administration known as the Octavians, gave Anne of Denmark a purse of gold which she then presented to the king as a New Year's Day gift.

Queen Anne's Jointure Act 1604
- Act of Parliament
- Parliament of England
- Long title: An Acte of Confirmation of the Jointure of the moste highe and mightie Princesse Anne Queene of England Scotland France and Ireland.
- Citation: 1 Jas. 1. c. 1 Pr.
- Territorial extent: England and Wales

Dates
- Royal assent: 7 July 1604
- Commencement: 19 March 1604 (Note: Start of session.)

Status: Current legislation

Anne's financial position changed in England when she was awarded a new jointure estate based on lands, manors, and parks which had previously been given to Catherine of Aragon. Administrators, led by Sir Robert Cecil, were appointed in November 1603, while the court was at Wilton House. The yearly income would be £6,376 according to a summary sent by King James to Anne's brother Christian IV for approval in December 1603. Anne wrote to Christian IV, pleased by the comparison with Catherine of Aragon, who was also a king's daughter. An Act for the Confirmation of the Jointure was discussed and read in the House of Commons on 24 May 1604.

The estate included Somerset House, the Honour of Hatfield, Pontefract Castle, Nonsuch Palace, and the old palace at Havering-atte-Bower. Robert Cecil had considered other royal dowries, including those of Cecily of York, Mary Tudor, and Mary of France. Thomas Edmondes heard the settlement was "as much, or rather more, than has been granted to any former King's wife". The manor of Topsham in Devon included admiralty rights at the port, and in July 1606 (after the sudden death of its owner) she obtained a cargo of tobacco from Venezuela.

The English jointure income was to be spent on Anne's clothes and her household wages and rewards. King James would pay the other costs of her household, stable, and food. The Venetian diplomat Scaramelli heard she had received a gift of valuable jewels from James, Nonsuch Palace, and a yearly income of 40,000 crowns. If she became a widow she would be independent of her son, Prince Henry. Anne would be able to grant leases of her English manors. Letters were sent to representatives who would join with lawyers to form the Queen's council to administer her English estate, a draft letter survives in the papers of her secretary William Fowler. She would continue to draw an income from her Scottish jointure properties. A similar commission for her Scottish properties had been appointed in April 1603 under the leadership of Alexander Seton, Lord Fyvie. Henry Wardlaw of Pitreavie was chamberlain of the Scottish lands, comprising the Lordship of Dunfermline, the Earldom of Ross, and Lordships of Ardmannoch and Ettrick Forest, and compiled accounts of the queen's revenue.

On 13 February 1610, John Chamberlain wrote that Anne "hath been somewhat melancholy of late about her jointure, that was not fully to her liking" and King James had promised additional funds. In the autumn of 1617, King James changed the settlement, giving Anne an additional £20,000, to make £50,000 yearly, from which she would pay for her household diet and stable if he died before her.

=== Marital frictions ===
Observers regularly noted incidents of marital discord between Anne and James. The so-called Gowrie conspiracy of 1600, in which the young Earl of Gowrie, John Ruthven, and his brother Alexander Ruthven were killed by James's attendants for a supposed assault on the King, triggered the dismissal of their sisters Beatrix and Barbara Ruthven as ladies-in-waiting to Anne, with whom they were "in chiefest credit." The Queen, who was five months pregnant, (Note: She gave birth to her second son, Charles, on the evening of 19 November 1600, at the same time as the Ruthven brothers' corpses were being hanged, drawn, and quartered.) refused to get out of bed unless they were reinstated and stayed there for two days, also refusing to eat. When James tried to command her, she warned him to take care how he treated her because she was not the Earl of Gowrie. (Note: James Melville, who witnessed the scene, wrote in his diary: "Foremost among those refraining to believe in the guilt of the two brothers was the Queen herself. She remained in her apartment and refused to be dressed for two days ... Although the King receiving full information of his wife's conduct and of the consequences to be drawn from it, he could not be persuaded to take up the matter right, but sought by all means to cover his folly.") James placated her for the moment by paying a famous acrobat to entertain her, but she never gave up, and her stubborn support for the Ruthvens over the next three years was taken seriously enough by the government to be regarded as a security issue. (Note: Barroll notes a "politically relentless" streak in Anne. Anne, however, always promised she would never take part in any "practice" against James.) In 1602, after discovering that Anne had smuggled Beatrix Ruthven into Holyrood, James carried out a cross-examination of the entire household; in 1603, he finally decided to grant Beatrix Ruthven a pension of £200, "because though her family is hateful on account of the abominable attempt against the King, she has shown no malicious disposition".

In 1603, James fought with Anne over the proposed composition of her English household, sending her a message that "his Majesty took her continued perversity very heinously." In turn, Anne took exception to James's drinking: in 1604 she confided to the French ambassador Beaumont that "the King drinks so much, and conducts himself so ill in every respect, that I expect an early and evil result."

A briefer confrontation occurred in 1613 when Anne shot and killed James's favourite dog during a hunting session at Theobalds. After his initial rage, James smoothed things over by giving her a £2,000 diamond in memory of the dog, whose name was Jewel.

=== Separate life ===
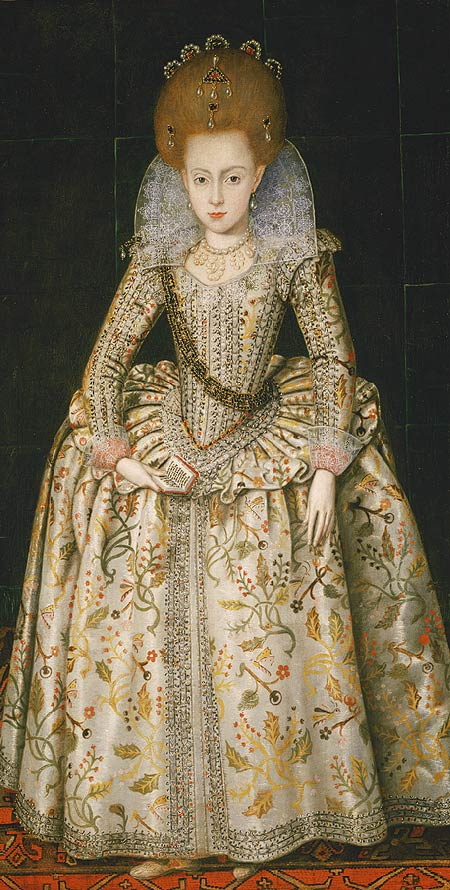
Anne's daughter Elizabeth, c. 1606, by Robert Peake the Elder

Anne enjoyed living in London, while James preferred to escape the capital, most often at his hunting lodge in Royston. Anne's chaplain, Godfrey Goodman, later summed up the royal relationship: "The King himself was a very chaste man, and there was little in the Queen to make him uxorious; yet they did love as well as man and wife could do, not conversing together." Anne moved into Greenwich Palace and then Somerset House, which she renamed Denmark House. After 1607, she and James rarely lived together, by which time she had borne seven children and suffered at least three miscarriages. After narrowly surviving the birth and death of her last baby, Sophia, in 1607, Anne's decision to have no more children may have widened the gulf between her and James.

=== A funeral and a wedding ===
The death of their son Henry in November 1612 at the age of eighteen, probably from typhoid and the departure of their daughter Elizabeth further weakened the family ties binding Anne and James. Henry's death hit Anne particularly hard; the Venetian ambassador Foscarini was advised not to offer condolences to her "because she cannot bear to have it mentioned; nor does she ever recall it without abundant tears and sighs". The letter writer John Chamberlain suggested that Anne absented herself from the investiture of Charles as Prince of Wales four years later "lest she renew her grief by the memory of the last Prince."

At first, Anne had objected to her daughter's match with Frederick V of the Palatinate, regarding it as beneath the royal family's dignity. She did not come to a betrothal ceremony at Whitehall, due to an attack with gout. However, she had warmed to Frederick, and attended the wedding itself on 14 February 1613. She was saddened by the tournaments on the following day, which reminded her of Henry. The couple left England for Heidelberg in April. From this time forward, Anne's health deteriorated, and she withdrew from the centre of cultural and political activities, staging her last known masque in 1614, and no longer maintaining a royal court. Anne's ailments included gout, dropsy, arthritis and swollen feet. Her influence over James visibly waned as he became openly dependent on powerful favourites.

=== Reaction to favourites ===
Although James had always adopted male favourites among his courtiers, he now encouraged them to play a role in the government. Anne reacted very differently to the two powerful favourites who dominated the second half of her husband's English reign, Robert Carr, Earl of Somerset, and George Villiers, the future Duke of Buckingham. She detested Carr, and although acknowledging his marriage in The Somerset Masque, she encouraged the rise of Villiers. Archbishop of Canterbury George Abbot and others had pressed Anne to support Villiers's appointment as a Gentleman of the Bedchamber; at first, she refused, saying, according to Abbot's own account, "if Villiers get once into his favour, those who shall have most contributed to his preferment will be the first sufferers by him. I shall be no more spared than the rest"; but Carr's enemies nonetheless persuaded the Queen to advocate for Villiers.

At her request, in April 1615 James knighted Villiers in her bedchamber. She developed friendly relations with Villiers, calling him her "dog". In an exchange of letters, Anne wrote to Villiers, "My kind dog, I have receaved your letter which is verie wellcom to me yow doe verie well in lugging the sowes eare". Villiers wrote back that he had pulled the King's ear until it was as long as any sow's. Even so, Anne found herself increasingly ignored after his rise and became a lonely figure towards the end of her life.

== Religion ==
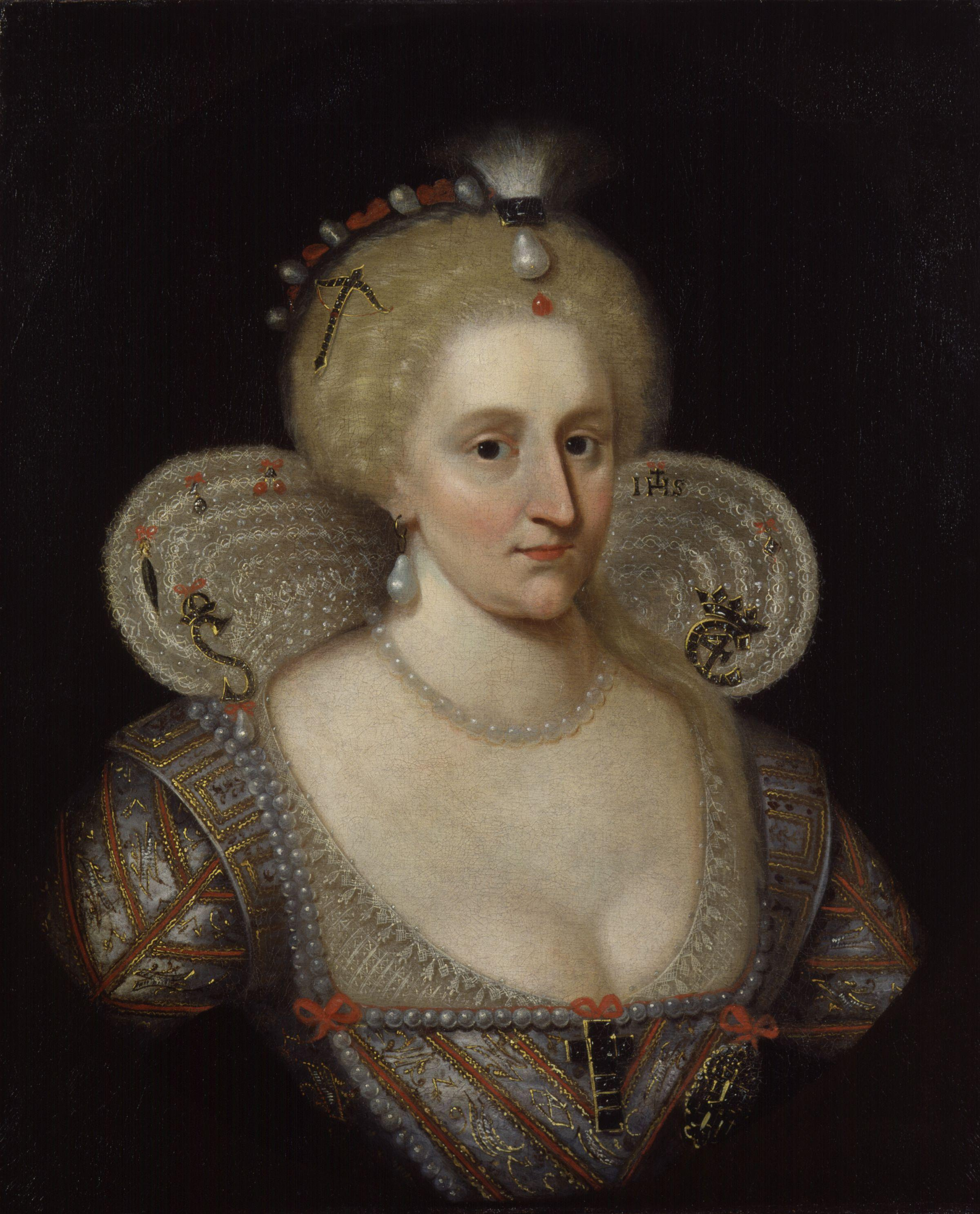
Anne of Denmark, c. 1616, by Paul van Somer

A further source of difference between Anne and James was the issue of religion; for example, she abstained from the Anglican communion at her English coronation. (Note: Willson takes Anne's abstention as a sign of Catholicism. McManus cautions that it may have signalled reformed-church distrust of the Eucharist.) Anne had been brought up a Lutheran, and had a Lutheran chaplain, Hans Sering, in her household. However, she may have secretly converted to Catholicism at some point, a politically embarrassing scenario which alarmed ministers of the Scottish Kirk and caused suspicion in Anglican England. (Note: Historians are divided on whether Anne ever converted to Catholicism. "Some time in the 1590s, Anne became a Roman Catholic." "Some time after 1600, but well before March 1603, Queen Anne was received into the Catholic Church in a secret chamber in the royal palace"; "The Queen ... [converted] from her native Lutheranism to a discreet, but still politically embarrassing Catholicism which alienated many ministers of the Kirk." "Catholic foreign ambassadors—who would surely have welcomed such a situation—were certain that the Queen was beyond their reach. 'She is a Lutheran', concluded the Venetian envoy Nicolo Molin in 1606." "In 1602 a report appeared, claiming that Anne ... had converted to the Catholic faith some years before. The author of this report, the Scottish Jesuit Robert Abercromby, testified that James had received his wife's desertion with equanimity, commenting, 'Well, wife, if you cannot live without this sort of thing, do your best to keep things as quiet as possible.' Anne would, indeed, keep her religious beliefs as quiet as possible: for the remainder of her life—even after her death—they remained obfuscated.")

Queen Elizabeth had certainly been worried about that possibility, sending messages to Anne warning her to ignore papist counsellors and requesting the names of anyone who had tried to convert her; Anne had replied that there was no need to name names because any such efforts had failed. Anne drew criticism from the Kirk for keeping Henrietta Gordon, wife of the exiled Catholic George Gordon, 1st Marquess of Huntly, as a confidante; (Note: The Countess of Huntly, a strong supporter of the Jesuits, was the daughter of Esmé Stewart, 1st Duke of Lennox, James's boyhood favourite, who had been hounded out of the country in 1582; she was therefore the sister of Ludovic Stewart, 2nd Duke of Lennox.) after Huntly's return in 1596, the St Andrews minister David Black called Anne an atheist and remarked in a sermon that "the Queen of Scotland was a woman for whom, for fashion's sake, the clergy might pray but from whom no good could be hoped."

When former intelligencer Sir Anthony Standen was discovered bringing Anne a rosary from Pope Clement VIII in 1603, James imprisoned him in the Tower for ten months. (Note: James sent the rosary back to the Pope. Standen had confided to the Jesuit subversive Robert Parsons that he was acting in Rome for the Queen. Haynes, 41. Willson assumes this incident is a proof of Anne's Catholicism, Haynes that it represents growing "Catholic leanings".) Anne protested her annoyance at the gift, but eventually secured Standen's release.

Like James, Anne later supported a Catholic match for both their sons, and her correspondence with the potential bride, Infanta Maria Anna of Spain, included a request that two friars be sent to Jerusalem to pray for her and the King. The papacy itself was never quite sure where Anne stood; in 1612, Pope Paul V advised a nuncio: "Not considering the inconstancy of that Queen and the many changes she had made in religious matters and that even if it might be true that she might be a Catholic, one should not take on oneself any judgement."

== Court and politics ==
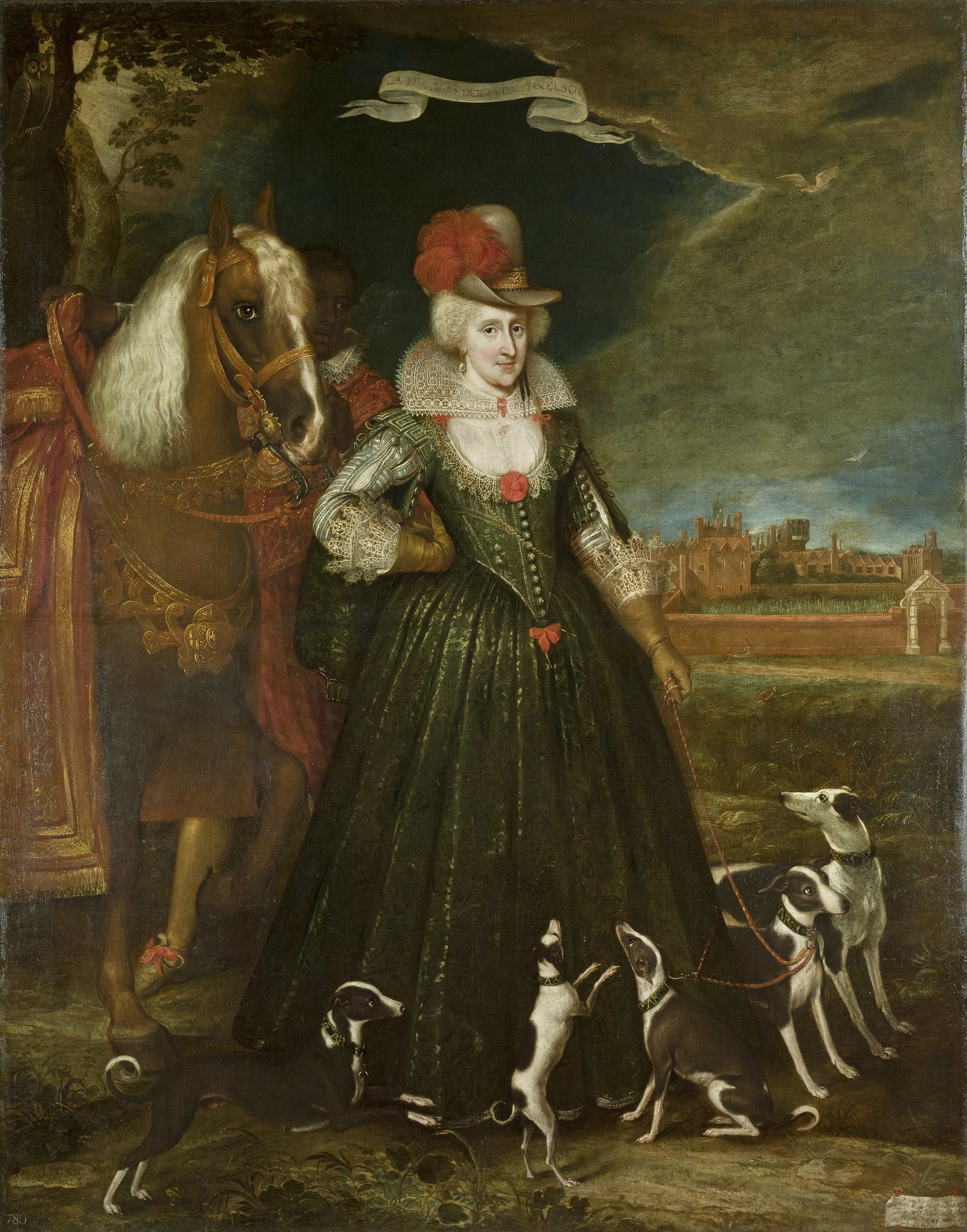
Anne of Denmark, c. 1617, by Paul van Somer

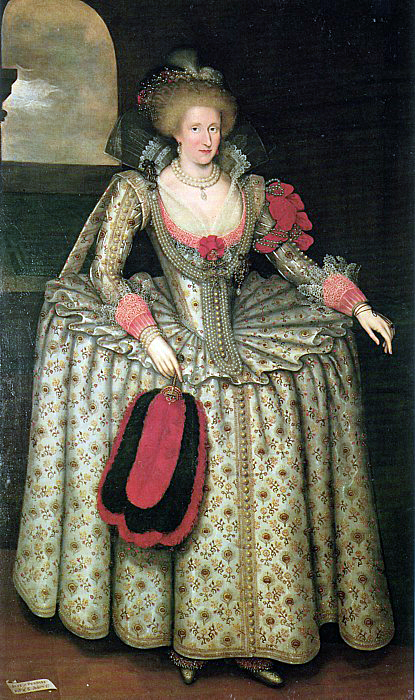
Anne of Denmark, c. 1611–1614, attributed to Marcus Gheeraerts the Younger.

In Scotland, Anne sometimes exploited court factionalism for her own ends, in particular by supporting the enemies of the Earl of Mar. As a result, James did not trust her with secrets of state. Henry Howard, active in the highly secret diplomacy concerning the English succession, subtly reminded James that though Anne possessed every virtue, Eve was corrupted by the serpent. Another of James's secret correspondents, Robert Cecil, believed that "the Queen was weak and a tool in the hands of clever and unscrupulous persons." In practice, Anne seems to have been little interested in high politics unless they touched on the fate of her children or friends, and later told Secretary of State Robert Cecil that "she was more contented with her pictures than he with his great employments." However, in November 1600 Robert Cecil had been anxious to find out about correspondence she had with Archduke Albert, Governor of the Spanish Netherlands.

In England, Anne largely turned from political to social and artistic activities. Though she participated fully in the life of James's court and maintained a court of her own, often attracting those not welcomed by James, she rarely took political sides against her husband. Whatever her private difficulties with James, she proved a diplomatic asset to him in England, conducting herself with discretion and graciousness in public. Anne played a crucial role, for example, in conveying to ambassadors and foreign visitors the prestige of the Stuart dynasty and its Danish connections.

The Venetian envoy, Nicolò Molin, wrote this description of Anne in 1606:

She is intelligent and prudent; and knows the disorders of the government, in which she has no part, though many hold that as the King is most devoted to her, she might play as large a role as she wished. But she is young and averse to trouble; she sees that those who govern desire to be left alone, and so she professes indifference. All she ever does is to beg a favour for someone. She is full of kindness for those who support her, but on the other hand she is terrible, proud, unendurable to those she dislikes.

Anne's comments did attract attention and were reported by diplomats. In May 1612 the Duke of Bouillon came to London as the ambassador of Marie de' Medici, dowager of France. According to the Venetian ambassador, Antonio Foscarini, his instructions included a proposal of marriage between Princess Christine, the second Princess of France, and Prince Henry. Anne told one of his senior companions that she would prefer Prince Henry married a French princess without a dowry than a Florentine princess with any amount of gold.

=== Reputation ===
Anne has traditionally been regarded with condescension by historians, who have emphasised her triviality and extravagance. Along with James, she tended to be dismissed by a historical tradition, beginning with the anti-Stuart historians of the mid-17th century, which saw in the self-indulgence and vanity of the Jacobean court the origins of the English Civil War. Historian David Harris Willson, in his 1956 biography of James, delivered this damning verdict: "Anne had little influence over her husband. She could not share his intellectual interests, and she confirmed the foolish contempt with which he regarded women. Alas! The king had married a stupid wife." The 19th-century biographer Agnes Strickland condemned Anne's actions to regain custody of Prince Henry as irresponsible: "It must lower the character of Anne of Denmark in the eyes of everyone, both as a woman and queen, that she ... preferred to indulge the mere instincts of maternity at the risk of involving her husband, her infant, and their kingdom, in the strife and misery of unnatural warfare."

However, the reassessment of James in the past two decades, as an able ruler who extended royal power in Scotland and preserved his kingdoms from war throughout his reign, (Note: Croft summarises the elements of this reappraisal in her introduction to King James) has been accompanied by a re-evaluation of Anne as an influential political figure and assertive mother, at least for as long as the royal marriage remained a reality. John Leeds Barroll argues in his cultural biography of Anne that her political interventions in Scotland were more significant, and certainly more troublesome, than previously noticed; and Clare McManus, among other cultural historians, has highlighted Anne's influential role in the Jacobean cultural flowering, not only as a patron of writers and artists but as a performer herself.

== Patron of the arts ==
Anne shared with James the fault of extravagance, though it took her several years to exhaust her considerable dowry. In 1593, James appointed a special Council, known as the "Octavians", to sort out Anne's accounts and make economies. She loved dancing and pageants, activities often frowned upon in Presbyterian Scotland, but for which she found a vibrant outlet in Jacobean London, where she created a "rich and hospitable" cultural climate at the royal court, became an enthusiastic playgoer, and sponsored lavish masques. Sir Walter Cope, asked by Robert Cecil to select a play for the Queen during her brother Ulrik of Holstein's visit, wrote, "Burbage is come and says there is no new play the Queen has not seen but they have revived an old one called Love's Labour's Lost which for wit and mirth he says will please her exceedingly." (Note: This Burbage was probably Cuthbert Burbage, brother of Richard Burbage.) Her patronage and involvement in drama and the London stage allowed her to exert considerable influence. Anne's masques, scaling unprecedented heights of dramatic staging and spectacle, were avidly attended by foreign ambassadors and dignitaries and functioned as a potent demonstration of the English crown's European significance. Zorzi Giustinian, the Venetian ambassador, wrote of the Christmas 1604 masque that "in everyone's opinion no other Court could have displayed such pomp and riches".

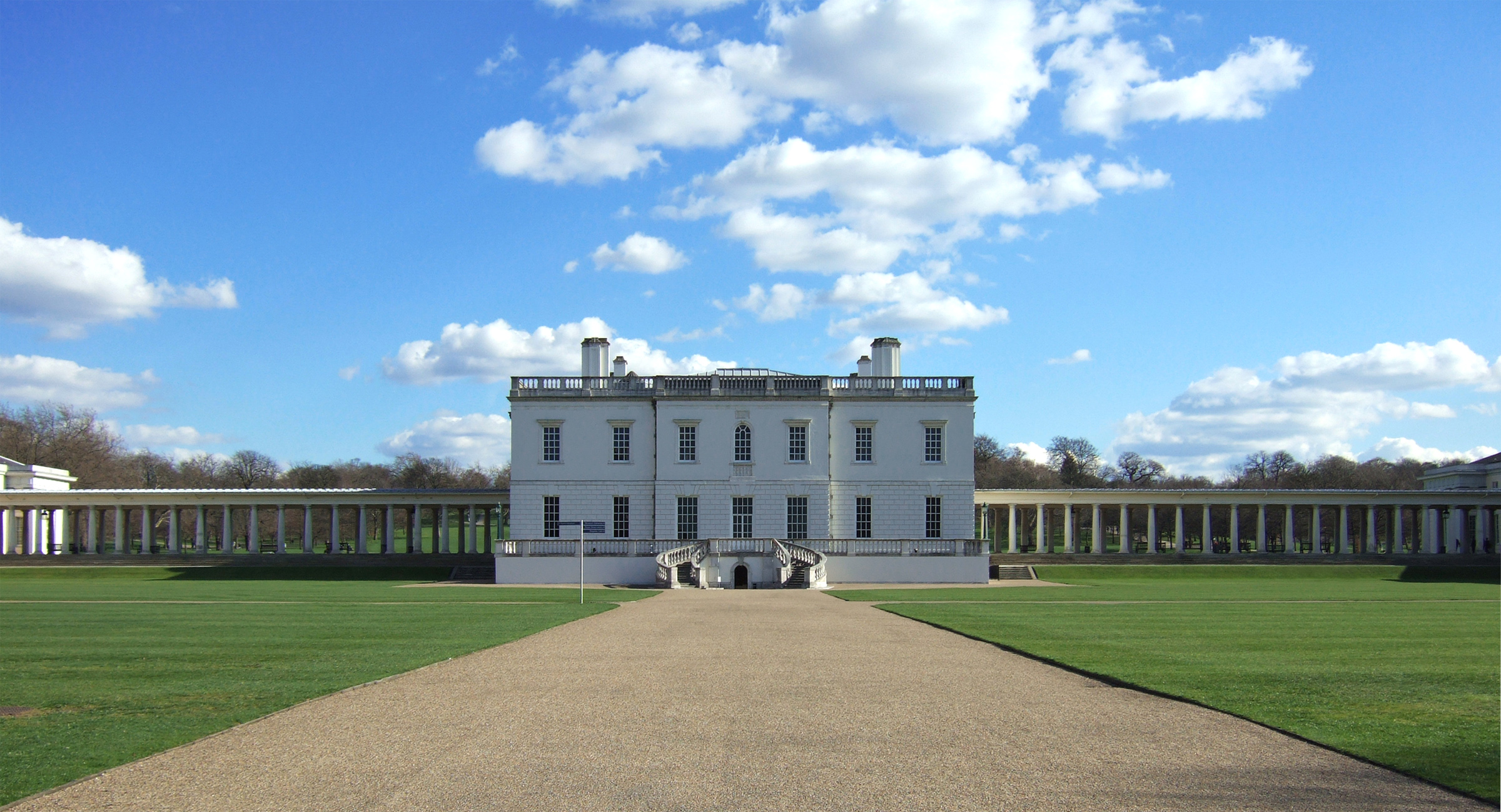
The Queen's House at Greenwich, begun for Anne in 1616

Anne's masques were responsible for almost all the courtly female performance in the first two decades of the 17th-century and are regarded as crucial to the history of women's performance. Anne sometimes performed with her ladies in the masques herself, occasionally offending or scandalising members of the audience. In Anne's first masque, Samuel Daniel's The Vision of the Twelve Goddesses of 1604, she played Pallas Athena, wearing a tunic that Dudley Carleton judged too short, because it revealed her legs and feet. Anne commissioned the leading talents of the day to create these masques, including Ben Jonson and Inigo Jones. (Note: "The part she played in promoting the fortunes of Ben Jonson and Inigo Jones has never been sufficiently recognised." Other writers employed by Anne included Samuel Daniel, Thomas Campion and John Donne.) In The Masque of Blackness of 1605, Anne performed while six months pregnant, and caused further scandal by appearing, alongside several of her ladies in waiting, with their skin painted as "blackamores". Carleton reported that, when the Queen afterwards danced with the Spanish ambassador, he kissed her hand "though there was danger it would have left a mark upon his lips".

According to John Webb, Inigo Jones had worked for Christian IV in Denmark before joining Anne's service in England. Jones, a gifted architect steeped in the latest European taste, also designed the Queen's House at Greenwich for Anne, one of the first true Palladian buildings in England, (Note: Probably, the first floor was finished at Anne's death.) as well as ornamental gateways for her gardens and vineyard at Oatlands. The Sergeant Painter John de Critz decorated a fireplace in her "tiring chamber", her dressing room at Somerset House with various colours of marbling and imitation stone, and painted black and white marble in the chapel at Oatlands. In 1618 a passage at Somerset House was decorated with Renaissance style grotesque work, recorded as "crotesque".

The diplomat Ralph Winwood obtained special greyhounds for her hunting from Jacob van den Eynde, Governor of Woerden. The Dutch inventor Salomon de Caus laid out her gardens at Greenwich and Somerset House. She had a barge for her journeys on the Thames, with glass windows. Anne particularly loved music and patronised the lutenist and composer John Dowland, (Note: Dowland dedicated his Lachrymae to Anne.) previously employed at her brother's court in Denmark, as well as "more than a good many" French musicians. Between 1607 and her death in 1619 she also employed the Irish harper Daniel Duff O'Cahill.

Anne also commissioned artists such as Paul van Somer, Isaac Oliver, and Daniel Mytens, who led English taste in visual arts for a generation. Under Anne, the Royal Collection began once more to expand, a policy continued by Anne's son, Charles. With some irony, Anne's servant Jane Drummond compared the queen's reputation to be content among "harmless pictures in a paltry gallery" with the Earl of Salisbury's "great employments in fair rooms". Drummond's remark contrasts the smaller and more private spaces housing the queen's collection with the halls and presence chambers where statecraft was enacted. Two paintings from her collection are now held by the Montreal Museum of Fine Arts, depicting Christ and the woman at the well and Christ and the Canaanite woman.

She was involved in an unsuccessful attempt to found a college or university at Ripon in Yorkshire in 1604. The scheme was promoted by Cecily Sandys, the widow of the Bishop Edwin Sandys and other supporters including Bess of Hardwick and Gilbert Talbot, 7th Earl of Shrewsbury. Historian Alan Stewart suggests that many of the phenomena now seen as peculiarly Jacobean can be identified more closely with Anne's patronage than with James, who "fell asleep during some of England's most celebrated plays".

Anne had a surprisingly good relationship with James Montague, one of James's closest aides and Bishop of Bath and Wells from 1608 to 1616. Her first visit to Bath may have been timed to coincide with the completion of the re-roofing of Bath Abbey, at the bishop's own expense, and Montague staged a "Panegiricall entertainement", probably at the bishop's palace in Wells in 1613, in which the character of Joseph of Arimathea presented the queen with a bough from the Holy Thorn of Glastonbury.

After Anne's death's her musicians remained at court and were involved in the entertainment of a French ambassador at Whitehall Palace on 20 May 1619. The Duke of Lennox hosted a feast in King's Great Chamber. A supper of sweetmeats was served in glass bowls brought in on Chinese porcelain platters. The guests moved from the Great Hall to the Queen's Privy Chamber, where they heard the late Queen's French musicians sing, and in the Queen's bedchamber the Irish harp (played by Donell Dubh Ó Cathail), a viol, and Mr Lanier singing and playing on the lute. They returned to the Great Chamber for a performance of Shakespeare's Pericles.

== Later years and illness ==
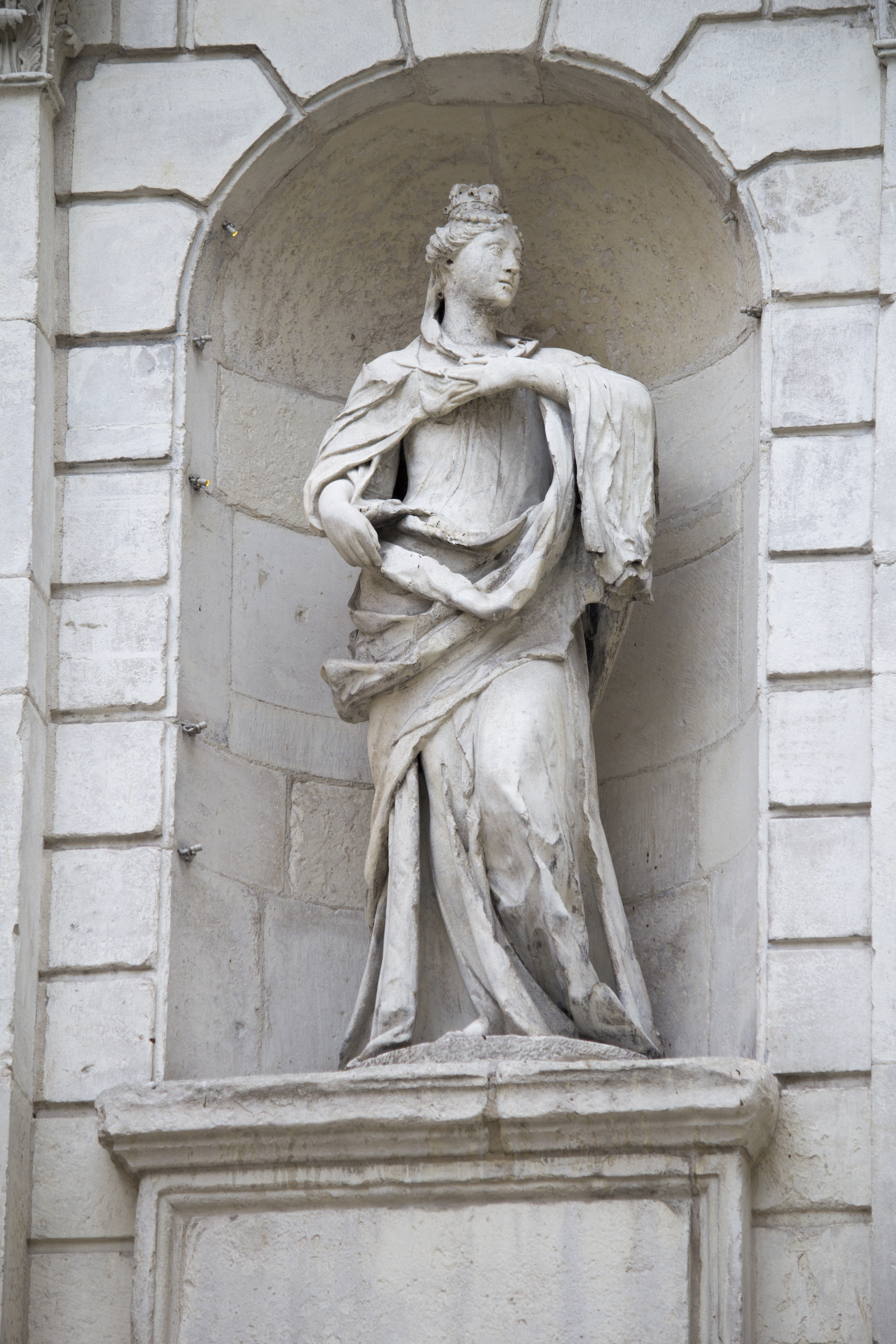
A statue of Anne of Denmark in the Temple Bar Gate

Anne of Denmark received "great good" from recipes provided by Walter Raleigh. The royal physician Sir Theodore de Mayerne left extensive Latin notes describing his treatment of Anne of Denmark from 10 April 1612 to her death. From September 1614 Anne was troubled by pain in her feet, as described in the letters of her chamberlain Viscount Lisle and the countesses of Bedford and Roxburghe. Lisle first noted "the Queen hath been a little lame" as early as October 1611. She was ill in March 1615, suspected to have dropsy. In August an attack of gout forced her to stay an extra week in Bath, her second visit to the spa town for its medicinal waters.

Although she danced at a Christmas masque, said to be "a good sign of her convalescence", in January 1616 she moved from Whitehall Palace to Somerset House suffering from gout. King James planned to visit Scotland, and it was said that she dreamed of ruling England as regent in his absence. The Earl of Dunfermline noted in February that "her majesty looks very well, but yet I think is not perfectly well, she infrequently dresses, and keeps her bedchamber and a solitary life most times." James went to Scotland, while Anne stayed at Greenwich Palace and moved to Oatlands in June. She was well enough to go hunting in August 1617. By late 1617, Anne's bouts of illness had become debilitating; the letter writer John Chamberlain recorded: "The Queen continues still ill disposed and though she would fain lay all her infirmities upon the gout yet most of her physicians fear a further inconvenience of an ill habit or disposition through her whole body."

In December 1617 the Venetian ambassador Piero Contarini had to wait a few days to get an audience with her because of illness. He described her appearance at Somerset House. She was seated under a canopy of gold brocade. Her costume was pink and gold, low cut at the front in an oval shape, and her farthingale was four feet wide. Her hair was dressed with diamonds and other jewels and extended in rays, or like the petals of a sunflower, with artificial hair. She had two little dogs who barked at the ambassador. Contarini had a second audience with Anne in December and was led through private corridors in the palace by a richly dressed lady in waiting carrying a candle.

On 9 April 1618 she was well enough to make a shopping trip incognito to the Royal Exchange, and was discovered, drawing a crowd of onlookers. She had a nosebleed at Oatlands in September 1618 that confined her to bed and disrupted her travel plans. Lucy, Countess of Bedford, thought it had weakened her, and she appeared "dangerously ill". In November, a comet was interpreted as a portent of her death, but she was reported to be in good health and had watched a fox hunt from her bedroom window. Lady Anne Clifford recorded that Anne was ill throughout Christmas and missed seeing masque performed at the Whitehall Banqueting House.

== Death and funeral ==
Anne moved to Hampton Court and was attended by Mayerne and Henry Atkins. In January 1619 Mayerne instructed Anne to saw wood to improve her blood flow, but the exertion served to make her worse. Mayerne attributed the queen's ill-health to her cold and northerly upbringing, and wrote in his notes that as a child she had been carried around by her nurses until the age of nine, rather than allowed to walk.

James visited Anne only three times during her last illness, (Note: David Willson, on the other hand, says that James visited her twice a week until he moved to Newmarket in February. Both James, through messengers, and Charles were anxious Anne should make a will (James distrusted Charles's interest in the matter, fearing Anne might make him her sole heir), but she would not co-operate.) though their son Charles often slept in the adjoining bedroom at Hampton Court Palace and was at her bedside during her last hours, when she had lost her sight. With her until the end was her personal maid, Anna Kaas, who had arrived with her from Denmark in 1590.

Queen Anne died aged 44 on 2 March 1619, of dropsy.

Despite his neglect of Anne, James was emotionally affected by her death. James had also fallen seriously ill when Prince Henry was dying. He did not visit her during her dying days or attend her funeral, being himself sick, the symptoms, according to Sir Theodore de Mayerne, including "fainting, sighing, dread, incredible sadness ...". The king "took her death seemly". The inquest discovered Anne to be "much wasted within, specially her liver". After a prolonged delay, due to a lack of ready money to pay the funeral expenses, the monarchy already being in great debt to its suppliers, she was buried in King Henry's Chapel, Westminster Abbey, on 13 May 1619. John Chamberlain recorded that the funeral procession turned into "a drawling, tedious sight", since the noblewomen had to walk such a distance and became so exhausted by the weight of their clothes that "they came laggering all along", leaning on the gentlemen for support "or else I see not how they had been able to hold out".

The catafalque placed over her grave, designed by Maximilian Colt, was destroyed during the English Civil War. Inigo Jones had provided an alternative design for the catalfaque with more complex sculptural symbolism than Colt's.

As he had done before he ever met her, King James turned to verse to pay his respects:

So did my Queen from hence her court remove
And left off earth to be enthroned above.
She's changed, not dead, for sure no good prince dies,
But, as the sun, sets, only for to rise.

Lionel Cranfield, as Master of Great Wardrobe, spent £20,000 on the funeral. After the funeral, her French servant Piero Hugon, and Anna, a Danish maiden of honour, were arrested and accused of stealing jewels worth £30,000. Another servant, Margaret Hartsyde, had faced similar charges a decade earlier.

== Issue ==
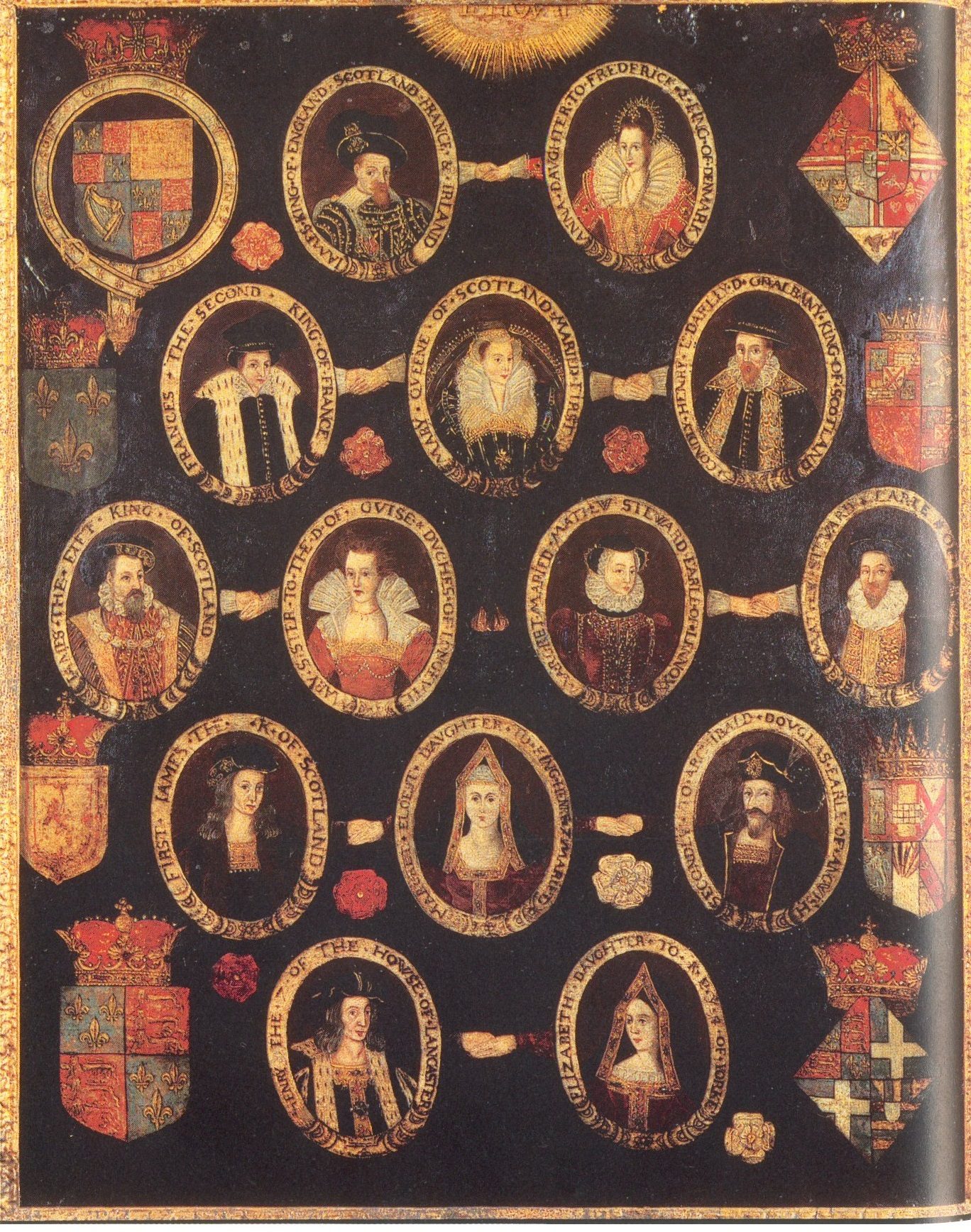
A family tree depicting James's ancestors

Anne gave birth to seven children who survived beyond childbirth, four of whom died in infancy or early childhood. She also suffered at least three miscarriages. The physician Martin Schöner attended her pregnancies. Her second son succeeded James as King Charles I. Her daughter Elizabeth was the "Winter Queen" of Bohemia and the grandmother of King George I of Great Britain.

1. miscarriage (September 1590)
2. Henry Frederick, Prince of Wales (19 February 1594 – 6 November 1612). Died, probably of typhoid fever, aged 18. (Note: John Chamberlain recorded: "It was verily thought that the disease was no other than the ordinary ague that had reigned and raged all over England". Alan Stewart writes that latter-day experts have suggested enteric fever, typhoid fever, or porphyria, but that at the time poison was the most popular explanation.)
3. miscarriage (July 1595).
4. Elizabeth, Queen of Bohemia (19 August 1596 – 13 February 1662). Married 1613, Frederick V, Elector Palatine. Died aged 65.
5. Margaret (24 December 1598 Dalkeith Palace – March 1600 Linlithgow Palace). Died aged fifteen months. Buried at Holyrood Abbey.
6. Charles I, King of England, Scotland and Ireland (19 November 1600 – 30 January 1649). Married 1625, Henrietta Maria of France. Executed aged 48.
7. Robert, Duke of Kintyre (18 January 1602 – 27 May 1602). Died aged four months.
8. miscarriage (10 May 1603).
9. Mary (8 April 1605 Greenwich Palace – 16 December 1607 Stanwell, Surrey). Died aged two.
10. Sophia (22 June 1606 – 23 June 1606). Born and died at Greenwich Palace. Sophia was buried at King Henry's Chapel in a tiny alabaster tomb shaped like a cradle, designed by Maximilian Colt.

== Ancestry ==
Ancestors of Anne of Denmark

8. Frederick I of Denmark (=14)
4. Christian III of Denmark
9. Anna of Brandenburg
2. Frederick II of Denmark
10. Magnus I, Duke of Saxe-Lauenburg
5. Dorothea of Saxe-Lauenburg
11. Catherine of Brunswick
1. Anne of Denmark
12. Albert VII, Duke of Mecklenburg
6. Ulrich, Duke of Mecklenburg
13. Anna of Brandenburg
3. Sophie of Mecklenburg
14. Frederick I of Denmark (=8)
7. Elizabeth of Denmark
15. Sophie of Pomerania

== See also ==
- Cape Ann, Massachusetts
- Sign of Hertoghe
- Anne of Denmark and contrary winds
- Letter from Queen Anne to the Duke of Buckingham, Folger Shakespeare Library.

== Notes ==
Anne of Denmark House of Oldenburg Born: 12 December 1574 Died: 2 March 1619
Royal titles
Vacant Title last held by James Hepburn as consort	Queen consort of Scotland; 1589–1619	Vacant Title next held by Henrietta Maria of France
Vacant Title last held by Catherine Parr	Queen consort of England and Ireland; 1603–1619	Vacant Title next held by Henrietta Maria of France
