= Gloria Bohan =

American businesswoman

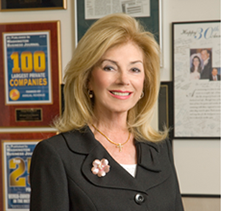
Gloria Bohan

Gloria Bohan is the founder and CEO of multiple travel management companies.

Bohan founded Omega World Travel, a travel agency, in 1972 in Fredericksburg, Virginia. In 1998 Bohan founded Cruise.com, an online travel services company focusing on cruise ship travel. She became chairman and CEO of TravTech in 2001, a travel technology company developing SaaS software for travel agencies and business-travel-focused companies. As of 2017, her company Omega World Travel reported annual sales of over $1 billion.
