= Leo Bohan =

Australian rules footballer

Personal information
- Full name: Leo Michael Bohan
- Born: 16 September 1929
- Died: 10 November 2016 (aged 87)
- Original team: Kew CYMS (CYMSFA)
- Height: 173 cm (5 ft 8 in)
- Weight: 73 kg (161 lb)

Playing career^{1}
| Years | Club | Games (Goals) |
| 1949–51 | Hawthorn | 18 (2) |
- ^{1} Playing statistics correct to the end of 1951.

Leo Bohan (16 September 1929 – 10 November 2016) was an Australian rules footballer who played with Hawthorn in the Victorian Football League (VFL).
