= Paddy Conneely =

- Born: Galway
- Origin: Ireland
- Died: 11 September 1851
- Genres: Folk
- Occupation: Piper

Paddy Conneely (or Coneely) (died 11 September 1851) was a blind Irish piper and singer.

== Life ==
He was known as "The Galway Piper", referring to his long-time period of residence in this region. Conneely was supported by James Hardiman, who presented Conneely with his pipes, made in the 1820s.

His music was transcribed by a number of collectors including Henry Hudson (1798–1889), George Petrie, William Forde, and Henry Westenra, 3rd Baron Rossmore, amounting to some 180 tunes. Most of his music manuscripts are now housed in the National Library of Ireland, the Boston Public Library, and the University of Notre Dame's library.

Frederic William Burton painted his portrait in 1839, and an engraved portrait based on the painting was published in an article by George Petrie in an 1840 issue of The Irish Penny Journal, making him probably the first folk musician to have had his likeness adorn the cover of a widely read journal.

Upon his death, his two sons were taken into care by the Christian Brothers.

== Bibliography ==
- George Petrie: "Paddy Coneely, the Galway Piper", in: The Irish Penny Journal vol. 1 (1840) no. 4, pp. 105–108.
- James O'Brien Moran: Paddy Conneely, the Galway Piper: The Legacy of a Pre-famine Folk Musician (PhD thesis, University of Limerick, 2006)

== See also ==
- Donell Dubh Ó Cathail, harper to Elizabeth I, c. 1560s–c.1660.
- Gearóid de Barra, d. 1899
- Tarlach Mac Suibhne, fl. 1893
- Martin O'Reilly, died 1904
