= Martin O'Reilly =

- Born: 1829; Galway, County Galway, Ireland
- Died: 1904 (aged 74–75); Gort, County Galway, Ireland
- Occupation: Uilleann piper

Martin O'Reilly (1829–1904) was a blind Irish piper.

Although associated with east County Galway in some sources, O'Reilly was born in Galway City, living at the junction of Eyre Street and Suckeen (now St. Brendan's Avenue). At one stage he became step-father to the piper John Moore (1834–87), as he married the boy's mother when her first husband died. He also taught the piper Peter Kelly and 'Old' John Potts (father of Tommy Potts).

He kept a dance hall in the Suckeen for some years before it was forcibly closed by a local priest. Francis O'Neill who published a short biography of him in 1913 wrote that "Sightless and old and unable to make a living by other means than music, he was obliged, like many another unfortunate Irish minstrel, to take refuge in the poorhouse as his only escape from starvation".

The intervention of the Gaelic League caused him to participate in the Feis Ceol of 1901 in Dublin, where he won first prize in the piper's competition. His performance - under the heading Large Concert Hall of the Rotunda - was described in a Dublin newspaper as follows:

"A notable incident was the playing of Mr. Martin O’Reilly, who played a selection entitled “The Battle of Aughrim,” descriptive of the advance, the trumpets of the British, the battle onslaught of the Irish soldiers, and the wail of the women. Aughrim was of course a lost field, but, nothing daunted, the gallant old piper, throbbing with a spirit that might long to play his countrymen into battle, fired them with a stirring and strident version of the victorious march of Brian Boru".

Following this he performed at a number of concerts in various towns around Ireland, such as the Belfast Harp Festival of 1903. A photograph was taken of him by a Father Fielding in Dublin, which in 1907 became the frontispiece for O'Neill's Dance Music of Ireland.

O'Reilly however ended up back in the poorhouse, in Gort, where he died in 1904.

== See also ==
- Paddy Conneely (died 11 September 1851), Irish piper
