= Nicolas Wardlaw, Lady Bonnyton =

Scottish gentlewoman

Nicolas Wardlaw, Lady Bonnyton (fl. 1561–1601) was a Scottish gentlewoman in the household of Mary, Queen of Scots. Her son James Wood became a controversial figure in Scotland.

== Royal household ==
Nicolas was a daughter of Henry Wardlaw of Torrie, now called Torryburn. When she joined the household of Mary, Queen of Scots, she was sometimes known as "Madame Torrie" and recorded in the accounts as "Wardlaw". She and another maiden, Jonet Seton, slept in Mary's bed chamber, and are mentioned in the treasurer's accounts from November 1561. A plan for her to marry David Seton of Parbroath in 1562 came to nothing. Some older sources confuse Nicolas Wardlaw with Nichola, a fool or entertainer at Mary's court.

== Wedding at Stirling Castle ==
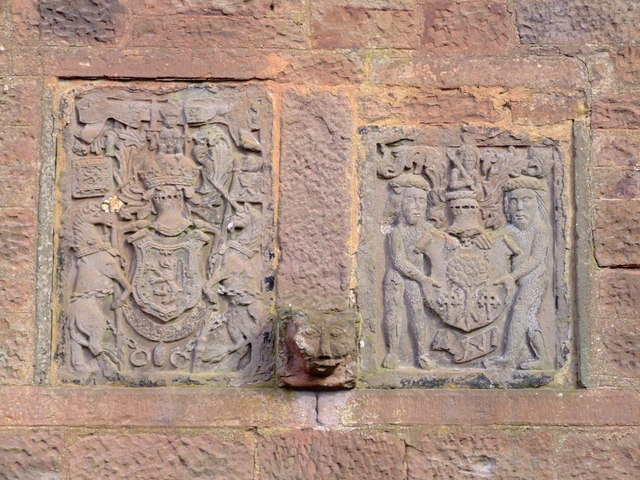
Armorials stones from Bonnyton Castle, home of the Wood family

She married Patrick Wood of Bonnyton (near Montrose Basin), at Stirling Castle in September 1566. In August, before the wedding, Mary and Darnley granted the couple lands in Aberdeenshire, Forfarshire, and Angus. Centered on Cuikbirnes north of Ellon, they would hold a new barony called "Birnes" (now Bearnie and Birness). David Seton of Parbroath and Patrick Wood made a legal settlement concerning the lands of Parbroath according to the previous marriage contract.

Mary also gave her a purple velvet gown with white satin skirt and sleeves. Perhaps because Mary was away at Drummond Castle, on her way back to Stirling after hunting at Glen Artney, Mary's half-brother James Stewart, 1st Earl of Moray became involved in ordering the costume.

Moray wrote on 31 August 1566 from Stirling to the treasurer Robert Richardson to ensure Nicolas Wardlaw received a purple velvet gown with passments of gold for her wedding. Such gifts were customary, though usually organised by Mary herself. Jonet Seton, her companion in the queen's bedchamber, was given a purple velvet gown for her wedding to John Bellenden. Moray wrote that Nicolas Wardlaw received the gift because "she hes bene ane auld servand and is sic a gentilwoman as is worthie to be furtherit". It has been suggested that Moray was concerned because Wood was his friend. Patrick Wood and his servant Walter Wood had been involved in the murder of David Rizzio and the detention of Mary at Holyrood Palace.

There was a swift turnaround as the clothes were needed at Stirling for the wedding by midday on Tuesday 6 September. Richardson passed a detailed list of requirements called a "memorial", written in French and signed by Mary, to Servais de Condé keeper of the wardrobe at Holyrood. Servais gave the outfit and materials to a page to carry from Edinburgh to Stirling. The "memorial" survives and was translated into Scots for the treasurer's accounts. The gown was made of 11 French measure ells of "violat velvote" or vellours viollet. Her white satin sleeves and skirt front, the grand manches and davant, were decorated with narrow gold braids, petite natte d'or.

== Bonnyton and the feud ==
Women in early modern Scotland did not use their husband's surnames after marriage, and she was known as Nicolas Wardlaw, Lady Bonnyton. Their children included James Wood who became feuar of Bonnyton (and fought at the battle of Glenlivet), David and Harry Wood, Isobel, who married George Gordon, younger of Gight, and Margaret Wood who, according to George Conn, was brought up as a lady in waiting or maiden of honour of Anne of Denmark. Mary, Queen of Scots, made a will in 1577 at Sheffield Manor, bequeathing 100 Écu to "Nicolas".

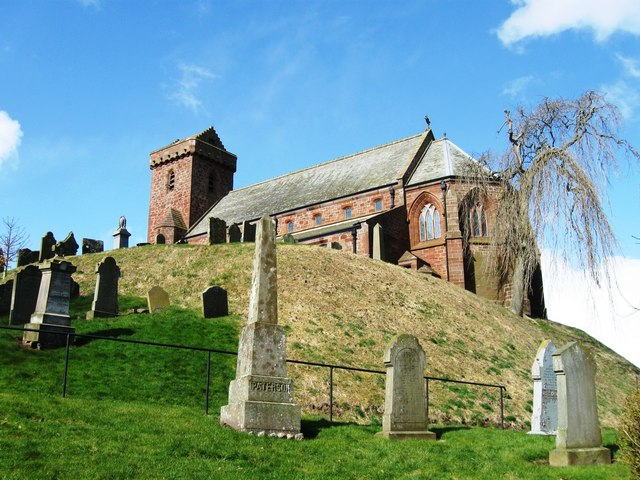
St Vigeans Church

Nicholas Wardlaw came to the christening of Patrick Young, at St Vigeans Church near her house at Letham in August 1584, and asked Peter Young, a former tutor of James VI, that the child be named Patrick after her husband. In 1604, Peter Young baptised a daughter, Nicholas, named after Lady Bonnyton who acted as the godmother. Peter Young's first wife Elizabeth Gibb and daughter Marie were members of Anne of Denmark's household.

In March 1596, Patrick and Nicholas complained to the Privy Council about the actions of their son James Wood and William Wood of Latoun, who were denounced as rebels for their Catholic religion. They had joined with another son, John Wood, and menaced Patrick Wood at Maryton Kirk. It was said that Patrick, Master of Gray, fuelled the conflict. James Wood and his parents seem to have quarrelled about family property and his marriage to Barbara Gray.

The family feud escalated, and in March 1601, Nicolas Wardlaw wrote to James VI about James Wood, who had been captured at Mass in Edinburgh. Her daughter, Margaret Wood, described as a servant of Henrietta Stewart, was also at the Mass at Andrew Napier's house, and the event was hosted by Helen Sempill (sometimes said to have been a member of the queen's household). James Wood had raided Bonnyton Castle in Angus, climbing over the barmkin wall with a ladder, and had taken away furnishings and legal documents belonging to his father and Lady Usan. He took the papers to the Place of Bolshan (a castle of the Master of Ogilvy) and then to the house of William Gray of Inchture, a brother or uncle of the Master of Gray. James Wood had also installed his wife Barbara Gray at Birnes in Aberdeenshire. The theft counted as treason, and James Wood was to be executed. Nicholas Wardlaw hoped the King could pardon her son. She blamed the influence of "evill cunsall" and hoped her son could become a "guid man". She signed this letter "Nicolas Lady Bonytoun".

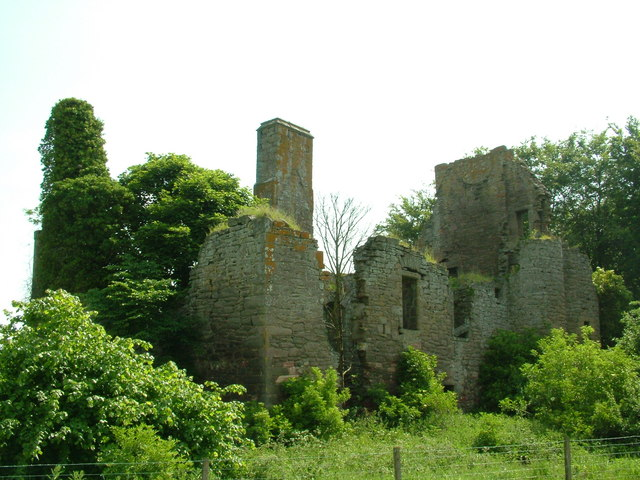
James Wood stole the family papers and took them to Moncur Castle at Inchture

James Wood was beheaded on 27 April 1601 at the mercat cross in Edinburgh, despite attempts at intercession by the Earls of Huntly, Errol, and Home. Huntly and George Gordon of Gight lobbied James VI at Falkland Palace. An English diplomat, George Nicholson, wrote that James VI was in a dilemma while Wood was held in the Tolbooth, considering that he might be seen to favour Catholics if the sentence was not carried out. Some Catholics in Scotland, including Alexander MacQuhirrie, thought that Wood was executed for his religion, and the charges brought at his trial by Thomas Hamilton mentioned the Mass and harbouring a priest.

Alexander MacQuhirrie wrote that Wood carried letters from Anne of Denmark intended for Pope Clement VIII, and at the request of Wood's sisters, composed a tract representing him as a martyr. William Crichton argued that the tract would not help the Jesuit cause in Scotland.

The execution of a noted Catholic pleased kirk ministers, including Patrick Galloway, though John Davidson protested that more action was required, and it may have gained King James credit in England. Thomas Douglas, aware of the legal principle, wrote that King James could not abide the crime of a son against his father, and feared his own son, Prince Henry, would do the same. Davidson was imprisoned in Edinburgh Castle for his criticism of the King.

James Wood's companion at the robbery, William Wood of Latoun, was reprieved. Two blacksmiths, the brothers Thomas Daw from Brechin, and Alexander Daw from Careston, were hanged for their role in the break-in at Bonnyton. According to Birrel, Alexander Daw was a dag-maker, a gunsmith, who opened the locks at Bonnyton. Daw confessed he had opened the outer-yett of the house and removed a bar from a low window. He forced the locks of chests in the chamber of dais and gallery.

Alexander Elphinstone (later 5th Lord Elphinstone) obtained a remission from James VI for the crime of attending the Mass at Andrew Napier's house. Barbara Gray, the widow of James Wood, remained at Birness, occasionally hearing Mass. After continued feuding, the youngest son of Patrick and Nicholas, Harry Wood, became the laird of Bonnytoun. In July 1624, he was kidnapped at St Vigeans Kirk and carried to his house at Letham by George Gordon of Gight, who made him sign over a large sum of money. The remains of Bonnyton Castle collapsed in 1785 and there is little to see at the site, except earthworks, the ruined dovecote, and two salvaged carved stone armorial panels set in the wall of a nearby barn.
