= Peter Young (tutor) =

Scottish diplomat and royal tutor (1544–1628)

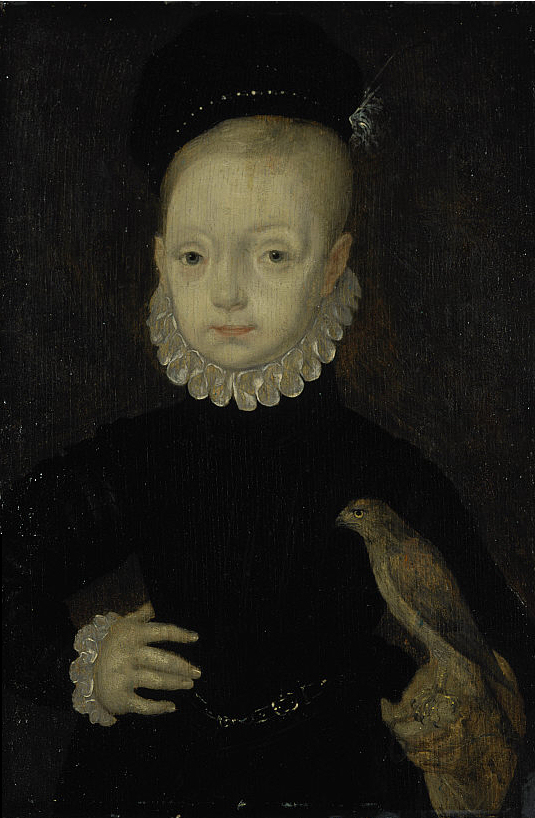
Peter Young owned this portrait of James VI, attributed to Arnold Bronckorst, Scottish National Portrait Gallery

Sir Peter Young (1544–1628) was a Scottish diplomat, Master Almoner, and tutor to James VI of Scotland.

== Early life ==
Young was the second son of John Young, burgess of Edinburgh and Dundee, and of Margaret, daughter of Walter Scrymgeour of Glasswell, and was born at Dundee on 15 August 1544. His mother was related to the Scrymgeours of Dudhope (later ennobled with the title of Earl of Dundee), and his father settled in Dundee at the time of his marriage (1541).

Peter Young was educated at the Dundee Grammar School, and probably matriculated at St. Andrews University, though no record of his attendance there has been found. When he was admitted burgess of Dundee he was designated 'Magister', a title exclusively used by masters of arts. In 1562 he was sent to the continent to complete his studies under the care of his uncle, Henry Scrimgeour, by whom he was recommended to Theodore Beza, then professor of theology at Geneva. Scrymgeour was appointed to the newly founded chair of civil law at Geneva in 1563, and Young resided with him until in 1568 he returned to Scotland.

== Tutor of James VI of Scotland ==
Young's reputation as a scholar was so great that in the beginning of 1570 Regent Moray appointed him joint-instructor of the infant James VI along with George Buchanan. As Buchanan was then advanced in years, it is probable that the chief share of teaching the infant king fell upon Young. He is referred to in complimentary terms in Buchanan's Epistolæ. From the account given by Sir James Melville of Halhill it appears that while Buchanan was "wise and sharp", Young was more of the courtier, in a household controlled by Annabell Murray, Countess of Mar. Young's attitude won the affection of the king, and Young was his favourite counsellor up till the king's death.

Young was involved in building the king's library. An inventory of the king's books written by Young survives, interspersed with exercises by the royal pupil. He wrote about buying books for the king, George Buchanan, and for the Countess of Mar, to Lewis Bellenden, Lord Justice Clerk who was better able to persuade Regent Morton or the Treasurer, Lord Ruthven to expedite payments.

In January 1580 he bought books for the king from the printer and stationer Thomas Vautrollier costing £100. He lost £70 sterling worth of books ordered from London which were taken from a ship, the Jesus of Bo'ness, by pirates in March 1582. Young had many of the king's books bound in Edinburgh by John Gibson.

Young also deciphered letters captured from the agents of Mary, Queen of Scots and wrote out alphabets or cipher keys for the English ambassador Henry Killigrew. On 25 October 1577 Young was made master almoner, a post in the king's household, and received numerous gifts and pensions, several of which are recorded in the acts of parliament. The treasurer's accounts record a gift of £2,000 in September 1580 to buy land for a "resting place to him and his wife and bairns". In April 1581 the king's favourite Esmé Stewart gave him a lease, or tack, of the lands of Seytoun, near Arbroath.

== Diplomatic missions to Denmark ==
=== Royal Marriage ===
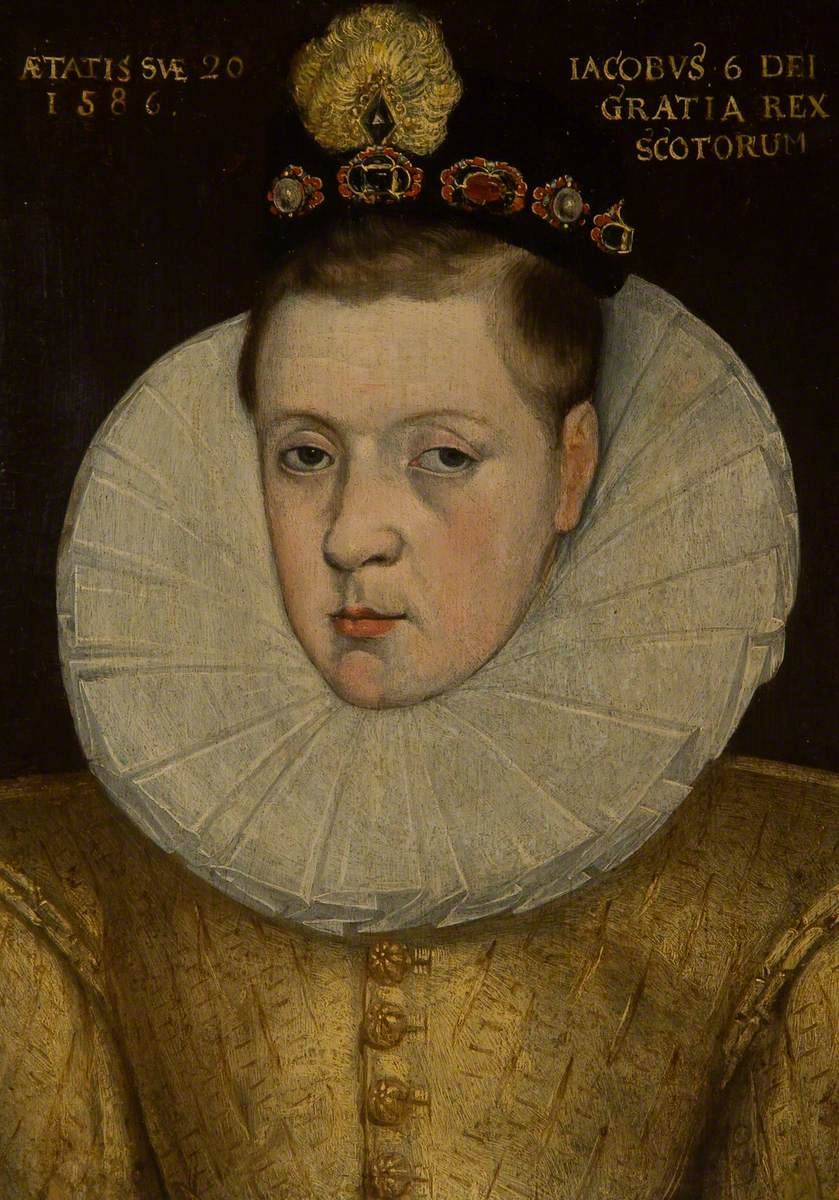
Portrait of James VI, dated 1586, National Trust for Scotland, Falkland Palace

In July 1586 he was sent with Colonel William Stewart on his first embassy to Frederick II of Denmark on business concerning Orkney. The English ambassador Thomas Randolph thought they would discuss other secret matters. Randolph wrote that Young was "wise, honest, and learned", but some thought him unfit for the ambassador's role because he was not from a noble family or the holder of an important state office. Courcelles, a French diplomat in edinburgh, noted that Young's negotiations included the subject of the king's marriage to a Danish princess.

Young was instructed to bring back portraits of the Danish royal family. Another French diplomat in Scotland, Charles de Prunelé, Baron d'Esneval, noted that a portrait of James VI had been made to be sent to Denmark.

Young's copy of the Latin letter written by James VI recommending him to Frederick II was discovered in one of his books in 1801, and published in the Gentleman's Magazine. He wrote to James VI from Helsingør at the end of July. Frederick II of Denmark had gone to Lüneburg to see the family of his sister Dorothea of Denmark, Duchess of Brunswick-Lüneburg, and any ambassadors arriving at the palace of Kronborg were told to lodge in Copenhagen to await his return. Fredrick's wife, Sophie of Mecklenburg-Güstrow was away at Frederiksborg Castle, where she expected a visit from her parents, Ulrich, Duke of Mecklenburg and Elizabeth of Denmark, Duchess of Mecklenburg.

On his return he was admitted to the Privy Council of Scotland on 7 November 1586. From that date until July 1622 he attended the meetings of the council. On 17 March 1587 he had a meeting with James VI at Crichton Castle, planning his next embassy. James VI wrote again to Frederick II, recommending Young and Sir Patrick Vans of Barnbarroch as ambassadors.

The embassy to Denmark of June 1587 was mostly with a view to the marriage of one of the king's daughters with James VI. The ambassadors hired John Gardiner's ship the Lion of Leith for £1000 Scots. They had their first audience at Antvorskov on 27 June with the Chancellor Niels Kaas, Manderup Parsberg, and Henrik Belo, while Frederick II declined to meet them for a few days because he had toothache. It was mentioned that there had been an exchange of portraits in 1586. Frederick II wrote to James VI that their audience was deferred.

Young recommended Elizabeth, the eldest daughter of Frederick II, as the most suitable match. The overtures for the hand of this princess were declined as she had been promised to another. Richard Douglas heard in August 1587 that the ambassadors had returned, and Elizabeth was promised to Archduke Mathias (she married Henry Julius, Duke of Brunswick-Lüneburg). The marriage plans were to be discussed at Falkland Palace in September 1587.

A letter of Alexander Young of Eastfield, probably his brother, mentions that Peter Young was ill on his return from Denmark, but joined the king at Falkland on 19 September 1587. In June 1588 another embassy was contemplated, and Young wrote to Barnbarroch, "As for my part I shall be ready to serve, and as willing to lie idle, and serving with my books, the wife, and bairns (children), if his Majesty will permit me."

It was then suggested that the king should wed the second daughter, the Princess Anne. It was said that although "Madam Elizabeth were the more beautiful, Anna was not unattractive, as the years would prove, of stature and height exceeding the first-born". The death of Frederick in 1588 delayed the negotiations. Early in 1589, Young was sent once more to Denmark to complete the marriage negotiations. In June 1589, Edinburgh merchants protested against the possibility of James VI marrying Catherine of Bourbon, making "unreverent speeches" about her. According to Thomas Fowler, Young and William Stewart told James that she was "old and crooked".

Young set out with James VI on 23 October 1589 to attend the nuptials at Oslo. According to James Melville of Halhill, Young did not sail with the king, but in one of three other ships, along with Lewis Bellenden, John Carmichael, the Provost of Lincluden, William Keith of Delny, George Home and James Sandilands.

=== Managing the Queen's Morrowing Gift ===
As part of the marriage, on the day after the wedding at Oslo (Upslo), on 24 November 1589 Anne of Denmark was given estates in Scotland, including; the lordship of Dunfermline, Linlithgow Palace, and the earldom of Fife with Falkland Palace. This was called the "morrowing gift" or the "morganatick donation" or "morning gift". These lands were given to Anne on 10 May 1590 with a confirmation charter presented to Danish ambassadors at Holyroodhouse on 17 May 1590 with the assent and seals of representatives of the Scottish estates and burgh towns. The Danish Admiral Peder Munk travelled to the three palaces and took possession by sasine in a ceremony where he was given a handful of earth and stone. In July 1593 Young was appointed by the Scottish parliament as one of a committee of nine to manage Anne of Denmark's income from the gift. The others were; Alexander Seton, Lord Urquhart, Walter Stewart of Blantyre, Master John Lindsay of Balcarres, James Elphinstone of Innernochty, Thomas Hamilton of Drumcairne, and Alexander Hay of Easter Kennet. These men were to advise the queen in "all things tending to her honour and commodities", auditing the accounts, appointments of kirk ministers, and making new tenancy agreements. In 1595 this group of administrators briefly controlled the Scottish exchequer and were known as the Octavians. On the death of Elizabeth I of England, the Privy Council of Scotland gave the committee a new commission to manage the queen's lands on 2 April 1603, adding Thomas Hamilton of Preistfield in place of Lindsay and Hay who had died.

=== Baptism of Prince Henry ===
In 1594 Prince Henry, the first son of this marriage, was born, and among the letters of Christian IV preserved at Copenhagen there is one dated 12 May 1594, acknowledging the arrival of Young as ambassador sent to convey official information of this event. Young carried a similar letter from Anne of Denmark to Henry Julius, Duke of Brunswick-Lüneburg. Young was instructed to invite Danish ambassadors to be witnesses at the baptism and festivities, to assure them of the queen's health, to explain the conclusion of the dispute over the queen's ownership of Musselburgh and Inveresk, and for Christian to intercede with Anne for the rehabilitation of John Maitland of Thirlestane.

James VI rewarded Young for his work on the marriage negotiations, and attendance on him in Norway, for carrying his orders back to Scotland, and his latest mission to Denmark in April 1594, by confirming in Parliament his rights to the lands of Easter Seaton and the shadow half of Dykmontlaw, both in Forfarshire, and rents from Wester Seton and the sunny half of Dykmontlaw.

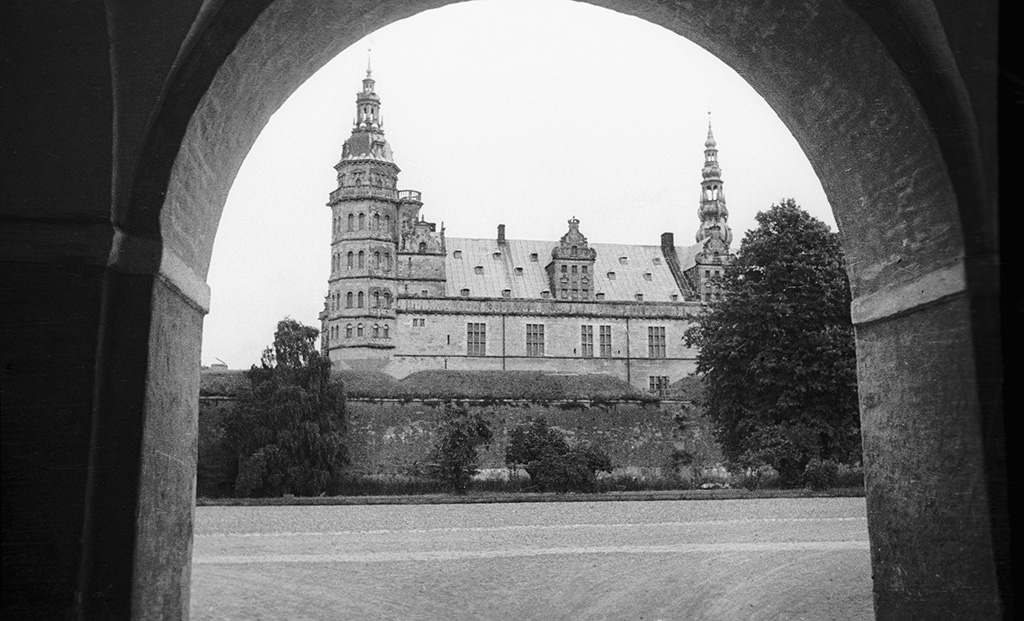
Peter Young was frequently an ambassador at Kronborg

At the baptism at Stirling Castle, Young, as Almoner, stood with the Captain of the Guard and the Master of the Wardrobe near the King's seat on a stage in the upper part of the Chapel Royal.

=== Coronation of Christian IV ===
When James VI was invited to Denmark in May 1596 to attend the coronation of Christian IV, he sent Lord Ogilvy and Young as his ambassadors, and they were accredited by Christian in a letter dated 6 August 1596. James VI rode from Falkand to Dundee to see them depart. As well as offering James's good wishes, and apologising for the absence of James and Anne, they were to ask for ships and troops for a mission planned against the Western islanders of Scotland in 1597. They returned by 3 October 1596.

=== Mission for the English succession ===
The question of the succession to the throne of England was on the mind of James VI, and he was anxious to gain the support of his brother-in-law Christian IV and the princes of Lower Saxony. In the wake of the visit of Anne of Denmark's brother the Duke of Holstein to Scotland in 1598, James sent David Cunningham, bishop of Aberdeen, and Young on a special embassy for this purpose. James VI hoped for a promise of military support in England in the event of Elizabeth's death. He suggested that Elizabeth was old and in increasingly poor health.

James instructed his ambassadors to discuss with Christian IV the issues of peace between Christendom and the Ottoman Empire, his right to the throne of England, Elizabeth's nomination of her successor, that all European princes should support his claim to England in favour of any candidates proposed by Spain and offer military help, and Cunningham and Young should ask Christian IV to write letters encouraging other princes to send embassies to Elizabeth on his behalf. Christian IV gave a written response on 3 August 1598, that he could not commit to these proposals in such uncertain times. If he was approached by James on the occasion of the death of Elizabeth, he would reconsider. He would send friendly letters to the Princes and Electors of the Holy Roman Empire that Cunningham and Young proposed to visit. Sophie of Mecklenburg-Güstrow, the mother of Anne of Denmark and Christian IV, Christian Frisius, Chancellor of Denmark, Christoffer Valkendorff, master of the royal household, and Henrik Ramel, councillor, sent letters of good will praising Young and Cunningham as orators and negotiators.

Peter Young's eldest son James stayed with Niels Krag in Copenhagen while his father and Cunningham travelled to other principalities. James VI may have tried to stop them going further, acting on information from Colonel William Stewart. While on their way they met David Chytraeus at Rostock, who had published an attack on Mary, Queen of Scots, based principally on Buchanan's Detectio. James VI was not happy with this and had instructed Young to remonstrate with Chytraeus and obtained a recantation. According to Dr. Smith, when Young returned to Scotland he wrote an abridged Life of Queen Mary, which he sent to Chytraeus.

Cunningham and Young went to meet Ulrik, Duke of Holstein and the Duke of Meckleburgh at Güstrow; the Margrave of Brandenburg at Custrin (now in Poland); Friedrich Wilhelm I, Duke of Saxe-Weimar regent for Christian II, Elector of Saxony at Moritzburg; Maurice, Landgrave of Hesse-Kassel at Kassel; Henry Julius, Duke of Brunswick-Lüneburg at Gröningen; and John II, Duke of Schleswig-Holstein-Sonderburg at Gottorf. They all sent polite and cautious responses. Young and Cunningham returned to Christian IV at Kronborg, who offered to send an ambassador to England. By this agreement in principle with James's ambition, the mission can be counted as a success.

Young and Cunningham returned to Scotland in November 1598, and the English agent George Nicholson heard that Christian and the German princes refused to make any moves on James's behalf before Elizabeth's death. Nicholson said the king was seen to be pleased with his ambassadors even though they had spent his money to receive "but this slender answer". The embassy had been financed by 20,000 merks of taxation. James and ambassadors rode to Dalkeith Palace to tell the news to Anne of Denmark, who was pregnant.

David Cunningham had already caused offence to the English ambassadors by his speech about the succession at the baptism of Prince Henry in 1594. On 6 January 1599, at Whitehall Palace, Elizabeth brought up the issue of the Scottish embassy, with Niels Krag, inviting him to watch her dance and telling him that she was still fit and healthy, and he should make sure the Scottish ambassadors knew it. In May 1599, James VI tried to shift the blame for Elizabeth's displeasure onto David Foulis who was alleged to have given her an unsatifactory account of the embassy.

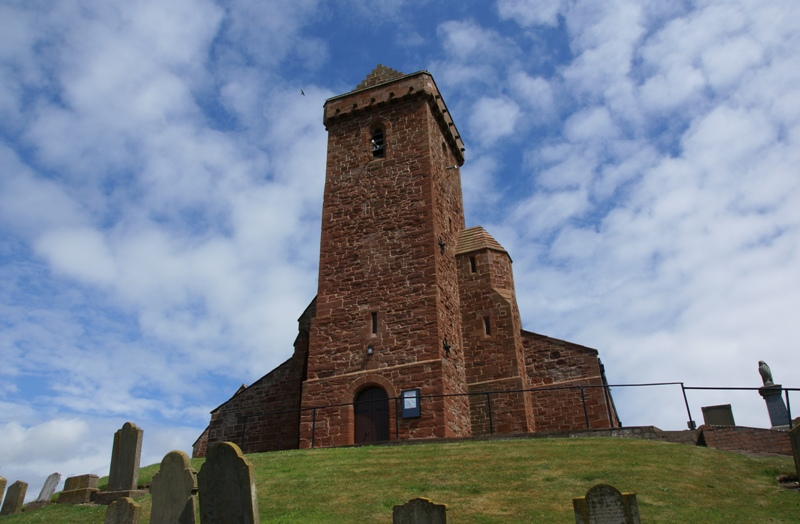
Peter Young was buried at St. Vigean's, where he had lands ar Seatown

== Later life ==
A commission was appointed in 1598 to report on the state of the Scottish universities, including Young as one of the number. He accompanied the king to London in 1603, and before they reached the capital James desired to mark his appreciation of Young's services by appointing him Dean of Lichfield, but he soon found that the office was not in his free gift. Young retained his post in the royal household as chief almoner, but resigned his office of keeper of the privy purse to the queen. In November 1604 he was made tutor and 'chief overseer' in the establishment of Prince Charles. The post carried with it a pension of £200, which was increased to £300 when Young was knighted on 19 February 1605.

In November 1616 Young was appointed master of Hospital of St Cross, Winchester, a special license being granted to permit him to hold the office though he was not in holy orders nor resident. Either in 1620 or 1623 Young desired to 'retrait home into Scotland, there to dye where his barnes may see him buried in the land of his forefathers,’ and at this time the king exerted himself to procure the payment of the arrears of pension due to Young. He had purchased the estate of Easter Seaton, near Arbroath, Forfarshire in 1580, and three years later built a mansion there, of which only one stone, with the date and the initials of himself and his first wife, is in existence, built into the farmhouse that occupies its site. In this place he spent his declining years, and here he died on 7 January 1628, in his eighty-fourth year.

He was buried in the vault of St Vigeans Church, near Arbroath, where a mural tablet bearing a Latin inscription is preserved.

== Works ==
It is stated that besides the Life of Queen Mary, Young wrote a Life of George Buchanan, but Thomas Smith, who wrote a biography of Young in 1707, could find no trace of either. Smith used extracts from Young's diary.

== Marriage and family ==
=== Elizabeth Gibb ===
Young was three times married. In 1577 he married Elizabeth Gibb (d. 1595), a sister of John Gibb, a gentleman of the king's bedchamber. Elizabeth became a gentlewoman in the household of Anne of Denmark, and made head coverings, snoods, and veils for the queen (known as "taffetas"), hats, and black satin veils for riding wear. In July 1590 she made three matching crimson velvet hats, for Anna of Denmark, and her two Danish gentlewomen Sofie Koss and Katrine Skinkel.

Young and Gibb had twelve children, seven sons and three daughters, including;

- James Young and Henry Young, twins. James was the heir, and became a gentleman of the bedchamber to the king. James Young married firstly Isobel Arbuthnot, and secondly, Jean Stewart.
- Patrick Young, named after Patrick Wood of Bonnyton (the father of Margaret Wood).
- Peter Young and Robert Young, twins. Peter Young junior was part of a diplomatic mission with William Spencer to Gustavus Adolphus in 1628. Robert Young was a member of the household of Prince Henry.
- Patrick Young, was the king's librarian, and Rector of Hayes and Lannerage, and a Prebendary of St Paul's.
- John (1585–1654), received his M.A. at University of St. Andrews in 1606, when he was elected fellow at Sidney Sussex College, Cambridge. He held various livings, a canonry in Wells Cathedral from 1611, and the deanery of Winchester from 1616 until 1645. His gift of ground for the erection of a school in St. Andrews has erroneously been credited to his brother Patrick.
- Michael Young.
- Marie or Maria Young (born 1579). James VI asked that she be named after his mother. She became a lady in waiting to Anne of Denmark, who attended her wedding to John Douglas of Tilliequillie at Holyroodhouse in February 1595. James VI gave her two black velvet gowns as a marriage gift, made by Peter Sanderson.
- Margaret Young, married David Lindsay of Kinnettles, Forfarshire.
- Frederick Young and Johanna Young, twins.
- Anna Young, noted in Peter Young's diary as his twelfth child.

=== Joanna Murray and Marjory Nairne ===
Peter Young's second wife was Janet Murray, Lady Hallyards, daughter of William Murray of Polmaise. She had been twice widowed: firstly widow of Lord Torphichen; secondly widow of John Graham, Lord Hallyards who was killed in 1592 by James Sandilands of Slamannan. Married early in 1596, she survived her marriage for only six months, dying in November 1596.

In 1600, Sir Peter married his third wife, Marjory, daughter of Nairne of Sandfurd, Fife, by whom he had four daughters, including;

- Elizabeth Murray, named after Elizabeth Schaw, Countess of Annandale.
- Nicola Murray, married David Boswell of Balmuto, Fife.
- Arbella Murray, named after Arbella Stuart.

Joanna Murray (Marjory Nairne??) survived him, and in 1642 made application to the House of Lords for payment of arrears of a pension. Previous to this time (in 1631) Charles I had directed that a pension of two hundred marks conferred on Young should be paid to his son, Sir Peter Young.
