= Margaret Wood (courtier) =

Margaret Wood was a Scottish Catholic courtier.

== Family background ==
She was a daughter of Patrick Wood, Laird of Bonnyton and Nicholas or Nicola Wardlaw, Lady Bonnyton, who was a daughter of Henry Wardlaw of Torrie and a former lady in waiting to Mary, Queen of Scots. She was sometimes known as "Madame Torrie".

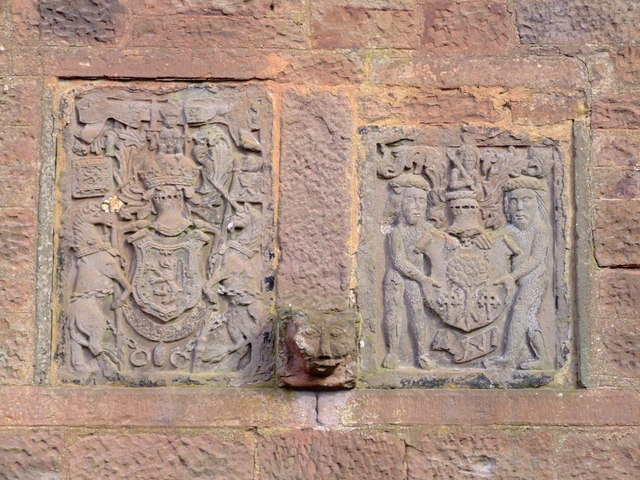
Armorials stones from Bonnyton Castle, home of the Wood family

Her mother, Nicholas Wardlaw, came to the christening of Patrick Young, at St Vigeans Church in August 1584, and asked Peter Young that the child be named Patrick. In 1604, Peter Young baptised a daughter, Nicholas, named after Lady Bonnyton who was the godmother.

The Catholic author George Conn described Margaret Wood as the sister of James Wood, the younger laird of Boniton or Bonnington (Bonnyton) near Montrose in Maryton parish, and wife of James (or William) Gray, tutor of the House of Schivas. She had been brought up among the maidens of the household of Anne of Denmark. She joined a nunnery at Carpentras. Her sister Magdalen Wood married George Leslie of Kincraigie.

== At court ==
Anne of Denmark bought clothes for some of the ladies in waiting and servants in Scotland, including a warm woollen gown of black cloth and plaiding for "Magie", possibly to be identified as Margaret Wood. The gowns were made in 1593 for the "maidens" or "damsels" who served in the queen's chamber.

In 1598 she organised the baptism of the child of a woman in Ellon parish, Elizabeth Burn from the Yett of Birness. Wood told her to take the baby to "the burn next to Barrowley" near Buffel Hill, where a man dressed in black plaid performed the ceremony.

Her brother, James Wood, returned to Scotland from France in April 1599 travelling with the English poet Henry Constable. The English diplomat George Nicholson noted that he was a Catholic and had a disagreement with his father. James Wood was arrested at Mass in Edinburgh. Margaret Wood also attended the Mass at Andrew Napier's house, and was described as a servant of Henrietta Stewart, Marchioness of Huntly, rather than Anne of Denmark. The Privy Council ordered the Marchioness to dismiss Margaret and a companion named Barclay.

James Wood had broken into their father's house, Bonnyton Castle, during a family dispute involving the lands of Birness in Aberdeenshire, which he given to Barbara Gray (a kinswoman of Margaret Wood's husband). He was carrying letters from Anne of Denmark to the Pope. James Wood was found guilty of theft and rebellion and executed on 27 April 1601.
