= Robert Colville (died 1584) =

Scottish Courtier

Robert Colville of Cleish (1532–1584) was a Scottish courtier.

== Family background ==
He was the eldest son of Robert Colville of Cleish (1508–1560) and Francesca Colquhoun. His father was master of household to Lord James of St Andrews in the 1550s and was killed on 7 May 1560 at the Siege of Leith. His grandfather was Sir James Colville of Easter Wemyss (d. 1540).

His younger brother was John Colville, the political intriguer. Colville's family home was Cleish Castle in Kinross which he rebuilt and extended.

== Career ==
Colville was Master of Household to Regent Moray. He was involved in negotiations with England after the abdication of Mary, Queen of Scots. Colville was involved in pawning the jewels of Mary, Queen of Scots, with Edinburgh merchants, including William Birnie, to raise money for the King's party. At the funeral of Regent Moray, Colville was a chief mourner with William Kirkcaldy of Grange, and trappings and mantles of mourning black cloth were bought for their horses.

Colville brought instructions from the leaders of the King's Party to the English soldier Nicolas Errington, for the Earl of Sussex in May 1570. The Scottish lords wanted an English army to enter Scotland and subdue the supporters of Mary, Queen of Scots.

In February 1572, during the Marian Civil War, Regent Mar sent him and the Justice Clerk John Bellenden to greet two English ambassadors, Thomas Randolph and William Drury, in Edinburgh and invite them to supper. Cleish carried letters for the Regent and his wife Annabell Mar.

Colville managed the rendition of the Earl of Northumberland, who had been involved in the English rebellion known as the "Rising of the North". He brought the Earl from Lochleven Castle to Coldingham Priory and delivered him to Lord Hunsdon at Eyemouth on 28 May 1572. This earned him a mention in a satirical poem of the period, The Answeir to the Englisch Ballad, "And Cleisch quhom to the gold the wes gevin".

Colville was clerk to the Treasurer of Scotland from 1571 and collected taxes for Regent Morton. Colville obtained a gift of wardship of some lands without paying a duty called "composition" directly to the treasury, but apparently paying Morton an equivalent sum by bond. This may be evidence of unusual practice or corruption of the finances of Scotland in Morton's favour. In November 1573, he was granted lands on the island of Gairsay in Orknay which came to the crown after the suicide of James Sinclair of Sanday.

At the end of Morton's regency, Colville was Master and Commander of Stirling Castle during a crisis in August 1578, which involved him taking artillery from the castle to Bannockburn where there was a stand-off with Morton's enemies.

In July 1583, he fell out of favour with the Earl of Gowrie and was ordered to go to confinement in Dumbarton Castle. His brother John Colville was to go to Edinburgh Castle. Instead, Robert Colville went to James VI to declare his innocence. After receiving little comfort from the young king, he secretly went into exile in England. He met Francis Walsingham at Durham in September.

His brother Harry Colville became minister of Orphir and Stenness on Orkney, and Provost of Orkney. He was involved in the trial and torture of Allison Balfour and her family at Kirkwall Castle for witchcraft in 1594. He was murdered in 1596.

== Marriage and family ==
He married Margaret Lindsay (d. 1601), daughter of John Lindsay of Dowhill and Marjorie Stewart. Their children included:

- Robert Colville of Cleish (d. 1634), who married Beatrix Haldane, daughter of John Haldane of Gleneagles. This Robert Colville, as Baillie of the Lordship of Culross, with other lairds and officials of Culross burgh, convened a witch trial in 1621 to investigate the case of Christiane Cooper, accused of using charms.
- Elizabeth Colville, who married James Lindsay of Dowhill and Kinloch.
- Grissel Colville, who married Henry Echlin, Laird of Pittadro. Echlin was Constable of Edinburgh Castle at the time of the "lang siege" of Edinburgh Castle in 1573. He negotiated the return of the Honours of Scotland to Regent Morton.
