= John Young (Dean of Winchester) =

Scottish clergyman

John Young (25 June 1585 - 20 July 1654) was a Scottish clergyman who served as Dean of the Winchester Cathedral from 1616 until his ejection in 1645.

== Biography ==
John Young was born the eighth of twelve children to Sir Peter Young of Seaton (1544–1628) and his first wife Elizabeth Gibb (d. 1595). Sir Peter served as tutor to James VI of Scotland at the time of Young's birth, and his political connections helped establish Young early in life. John Young attended Saint Andrews University and had received his MA by 1606 when he was admitted to Sidney Sussex College, Cambridge. Young was ordained a priest in 1610 by Bishop George Abbot of London. After traveling as a tutor on the Continent, John was translated to the Deanery of Winchester in 1616. Sometime between 1615 and 1617, Young married his wife Sarah Bourman (d. 1652). He and Sarah had five children together, named Sarah (1617-1636), James (1620-1647), John (d. 1686), and William and Agnes, both of whom died young.

Early in his tenure, John was made a Royal Chaplain, and sent to Scotland multiple times "on His Majesty's Service." Young was also considered an excellent theologian, and was consulted on various religious issues from the Five Articles of Perth to miscellaneous religious tracts. Young was a close associate of King James in the decade before the King's death, due to their similar theological views and Scottish heritage. James I and Young were both Calvinists, but were not nearly as radical as the much more infamous Puritans.

After the death of James I, John was less active as a civil servant. He was consistently passed over for Bishoprics, though there were several openings from 1626 onward. Although Young's Calvinism was an asset during James' reign, his son Charles I was much less sympathetic. Young was never punished for his views, and was even appointed to serve as a judge in both lay and spiritual courts. However, Young would never have the prominence under Charles I that he held under James I. During the Personal Rule of Charles I, Young was fully occupied with managing his chapter in Winchester, as his Calvinist opinions and Scottish birth caused some friction among members of the church.

Young largely avoided the conflicts of the English Civil Wars, even though Winchester was a sight of some conflict. One early confrontation occurred on 29 December 1642, when "rebels" plundered the Cathedral Church, destroying the Cathedral's Vestments, and ornaments, and stealing the silver chalices and plate. Afterwards, in a poem composed about the sacking of the town, the unknown author made much of the destruction of the church:

The Pope himselfe before this time had ne're
So many superstitious Rites as there
But now th'are to demolisht in that Towne
That now, if ever; Popery goes downe
...
Th' Organs uncas'd that everyone might see
Whence they deriv'd so sweet an harmony
So well they like'd them, that they did presume
Each man to take a Pipe and play his tune

Young was ejected from his deanery in 1645 amidst the conflict, and he then retired to Over Wallop in Hampshire. Young lived there for the next decade in relative quiet, and he died on 20 July 1654.
