= Henry Echlin (soldier) =

Scottish soldier (died 1608)

Henry Echlin, Laird of Pittadro (died 1608) was a Scottish soldier and Constable of Edinburgh Castle during the Marian civil war. He was several times a negotiator during the "lang siege" of Edinburgh Castle. Some sources give his first name as Andrew.

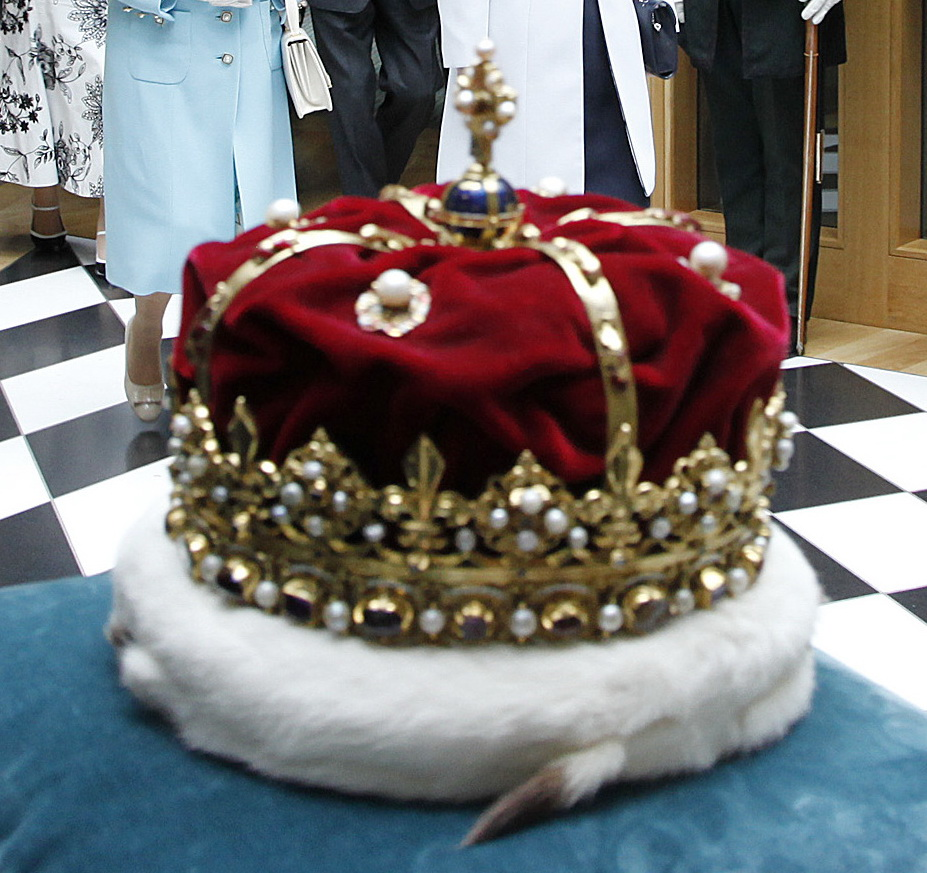
The Crown of Scotland

== Family background ==
Henry Echlin was a son of William Echlin of Pittadro and Alison Melville, said to be a daughter of James Melville of Raith. Echlin was known by his territorial designation as the "Laird of Pittadro", a property about a mile north of Dalgety Bay in the parish of Inverkeithing in Fife, Scotland. James V granted William and Alison the mill of Pittadro in May 1542, for his loyal service. The mill had been held by the late laird of Barnbougle. In 1566, Henry was named in a document concerning his father-in-law's lands as "Hary Hecklyng of Pittadro".

Henry Echlin, as laird of Pittadro or "Pittadrow", is sometimes confused with the comptroller of Scotland, John Wishart of Pitarrow (died 1585).

== Civil war in Scotland ==
Echlin was a cousin of William Kirkcaldy of Grange who held Edinburgh Castle for Mary, Queen of Scots between 1570 and 1573. Echlin was governor or constable of the garrison. His brother Patrick Echlin was also in the castle garrison, a soldier armed with a handgun called a "hagbut". When one of King's party, Alexander Stewart of Garleis, challenged Grange to a duel or single combat in July 1571, he sent the "laird of Pittadrow" with "young Pittadrow" or the "young laird of Drylay" (Alexander Crichton) to Leith to discuss the time and place for their appointment. The combat was called off.

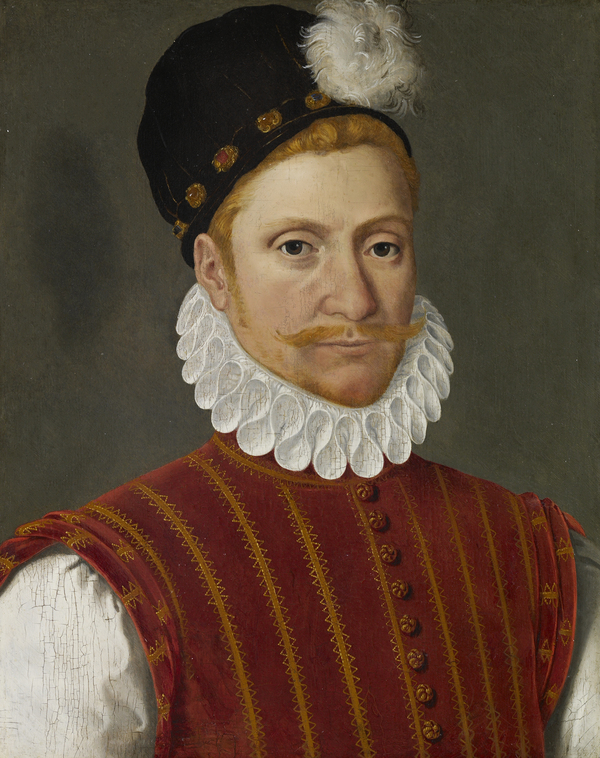
William Kirkcaldy of Grange, Scottish National Portrait Gallery

Echlin was found guilty of treason by the Parliament of Scotland in August 1571, along with his kinsman Robert Melville, a Fife neighbour Henry Wardlaw of Torrie, and many others. The penalty or "doom" was suspended in his case.

Echlin was involved in Grange's plans and strategy, and Grange told him and Robert Melville of hopes of support from France. Echlin was also a spokesman for Grange, involved in discussions with the English ambassador Henry Killigrew and the French ambassador Philibert du Croc in September 1572. Subsequently, he took part in negotiations at the castle gate, at Holyrood Palace, and midway between Edinburgh and Leith, before an English force came to Edinburgh to besiege the castle. James Melville of Halhill wrote that "Pittadrow" was sent from the castle to Regent Morton to "hear out of his own mouth" his responses to Grange's proposals.

According to the English diplomat Henry Killigrew, Robert Melville and Henry Echlin were tired of the conflict by March 1573. They would rather be anywhere else and "gladly be thence", and contemplated an offer of a pardon and 2000 crowns from Regent Morton if they deserted the castle.

On 17 April, Lord Ruthven finalised terms with the English commander William Drury, Marshall of Berwick, at Lamberton Kirk to bring an English army and artillery to take the castle. Amongst the detail, "Henry Echling sumtyme of Petadro" was listed with others who should be taken prisoner, and handed over by the English to be tried by the laws of Scotland. Echlin was forfeited by the Parliament of Scotland at Holyrood on 30 April with some of his companions including the goldsmith James Mosman. He could no longer claim income from his landed properties.

After heavy artillery bombardment, on 27 May, because the castle gates were blockaded, Echlin, Grange, and Robert Melville abseiled down the castle walls to negotiate a surrender. Regent Morton did not accept their terms.

Grange sent Echlin, his "cousin Pettadro", to negotiate the return of the Honours of Scotland (the crown, sceptre, and sword) to Regent Morton. He also offered Morton the remaining jewels of Mary, Queen of Scots, which were not earmarked as pledges for loans. Pittadro was also to ask Morton for money to redeem the pledged jewels with the condition that they would not reveal the names of the lenders. This negotiation had no effect.

The castle was surrendered to William Drury who took the leaders of the garrison, the "Castilians", to his lodging at Gourlay's house and then to Leith.

As agreed at Lamberton, William Drury handed the prisoners to Morton and left Scotland. Echlin escaped execution, and was held in custody by the Earl of Rothes, and pardoned by Morton. Rothes had negotiated for the King's party with the "Castilians", Grange and the leaders of the garrison, during the siege.

== In opposition ==
Pittadro and other surviving leaders of the Queen's party were pardoned. They were believed to remain politically active. David Hume of Godscroft wrote that these veterans of the Castle faction like "warts and freckles in a beautiful body" stained the lustre of Regent Morton's government. They were said to be involved in the overthrow of Regent Morton around the year 1579 and "advancing secretly and indirectly" the association of Mary, Queen of Scots, and James VI.

Echlin was granted a rehabilitation, the benefit of the 1572 pacification of Perth, by the Parliament of Scotland in October 1579 and was able to claim the income of his lands. Robert Melville, Echlin's kinsman and fellow Castilian, also received a benefit of the pacification. Melville and other "wyse foreseeing men", possibly including Pittadro, seem to have encouraged Esmé Stewart to come Scotland and gain prominence at court, and he may have helped them gain these rehabilitations.

== Marriage and family ==
In 1561, Henry Echlin married Grissel Colville, a daughter of Robert Colville of Cleish. Their children included:

- William Echlin of Pittadro, who married Margaret Henderson, a daughter of James Henderson of Fordell and Jean Murray, a daughter of William Murray of Tullibardine. Fordell was the next estate to the east of Pittadro. Margaret Henderson, Lady Pittadro, was involved in a witch hunt and died in Edinburgh Tolbooth in 1649.
- John Echlin, possibly regent to the batchelors at the University of Saint Andrews, censured for permitting the performance of a comedy at St Leonard's College in 1595.
- David Echlin, poet and physician to Anne of Denmark and Henrietta Maria. He mentioned hunting at Pitadro Craigs in his verse.
- Matthew Echling
- Robert Echlin, Bishop of Down and Connor (1576–1635), and minister of Inverkeithing in 1606.
- Bessie Echlin (died 1617), who married George Durie of Craigluscar. His mother, Margaret MacBeth, was a medical practitioner who attended Anne of Denmark at Dunfermline Palace.
- Margaret Echlin

== Death and reputation ==
Echlin died on 1 April 1608. His registered will records his name as "Hary Echling".

After his death, in 1629 when the courtier Robert Kerr of Ancram recommended Echlin's son David for employment by the Earl of Carlisle, he wrote that his father "the worthy laird of Pittadro, was one of the last men that stuck to the Queen our master's grandmother, and was loved and esteemed for it all his lyffe by K: James".

Describing the surrender of Edinburgh Castle in 1573, the 17th-century historian Robert Johnston wrote that Henry Echlin was "of great authority and estimation amongst those of his own faction".
