= William Hamilton of Sanquhar =

Pursemaster for James V and the Captain of Edinburgh Castle

Sir William Hamilton of Sanquhar (c. 1510–1570) was pursemaster for James V and the Captain of Edinburgh Castle during the Regency of Regent Arran. He was Provost of Edinburgh in 1554 and 1555.

== Career ==
William Hamilton was the son of William Hamilton, also of Sanquhar, and Katherine Kennedy, a daughter of David Kennedy, 1st Earl of Cassilis.

He was first known as Hamilton of MacNaristoun, and was appointed pursemaster to James V of Scotland in September 1524.

Hamilton travelled to France as a diplomat and in September 1528 brought back letters from Francis I of France co-signed by the secretary Florimond Robertet, showing that Francis was mindful of the 1517 Treaty of Rouen and would persuade the Duke of Albany to give up Dunbar Castle and would try to prevent Albany's return to Scotland.

In 1538, Hamilton gave a large sum of money to James V for the lease of lands belonging to Kelso Abbey and Lesmahagow Priory.

Hamilton went to England with James Learmonth of Dairsie and Henry Balnaves to begin negotiations for Mary, Queen of Scots, to marry Prince Edward. During the war known as the Rough Wooing, an English army burnt Edinburgh in May 1544. Hamilton had a lodging in the town and his family charters there were destroyed.

In 1547, Hamilton gave money to the Abbot of Melrose Abbey to help him pay the tax levied for defence. He administered the Abbey business for James Stewart, Commendator of Kelso and Melrose.

James Hamilton, Captain of Edinburgh Castle, son of James Hamilton of Stenhouse, was killed in a riot in September 1548. William Hamilton was appointed in his place. As Captain of Edinburgh Castle from 1 October 1548, in April 1549, Hamilton took delivery of 24 halberds. His annual fee for being Captain was £134-6s-8d. Scots, and he received a larger fee of £533 in September 1553.

In 1554, Regent Arran asked William Hamilton, as Provost of Edinburgh, with others to convene in the Tolbooth and collect information from the craft incorporations. The goldsmiths answered about the charges for the making of a silver mazer cup, and pointed out the variety of works in gold were charged differently, as were the range of possibilities in silver work and engraved decoration. Prices were arranged with the owner who commissioned this work.

An inventory of Sir William's furniture at Newton Castle near Ayr, made in 1559 during a legal action, is notable for its description of furniture. It mentions cupboards and a door made in the "courtly manner" and "raised and carved work of the most recent and curious fashion used within the realm". Another inventory of 1588 shows that some of the same furniture was still in place. The gardens and orchard had hawthorn hedges, gooseberry and currant bushes, roses, apple trees, plum trees, and cherry trees. There were also areas with kale and herbs.

== Marriage and family ==
Hamilton married Jean Campbell. His children included:

- Isobel Hamilton (died 1604), who married George Seton, 7th Lord Seton in 1550. Hamilton paid £2,000 for the ward and marriage right of the young Lord Seton. The wedding was celebrated with a feast at Edinburgh Castle on 12 August 1550 paid for by Regent Arran. Richard Maitland wrote that Hamilton helped Lord Seton rebuild Seton Palace, which had been damaged by the English army that burnt Edinburgh in May 1544.
- William Hamilton of Glenmoor. In December 1551 Regent Arran gave him the substantial sum of £53 Scots for clothes. His son Captain John Hamilton married the courtier Grissell Hamilton.
