= Elizabeth Gibb =

Scottish courtier (d. 1595)

Elizabeth or Elspeth Gibb (died 1595) was a Scottish courtier involved in the Queen's wardrobe.

== Career ==
She was a daughter of Robert Gibb of Carriber and Elizabeth Schaw.

On 4 February 1577 she married Peter Young of Seaton, a tutor to James VI at Stirling Castle. In early modern Scotland married women did not usually adopt their husband's surnames. A datestone from their long demolished house at Seaton, Forfarshire, was carved with their initials, "1583 PY EG."

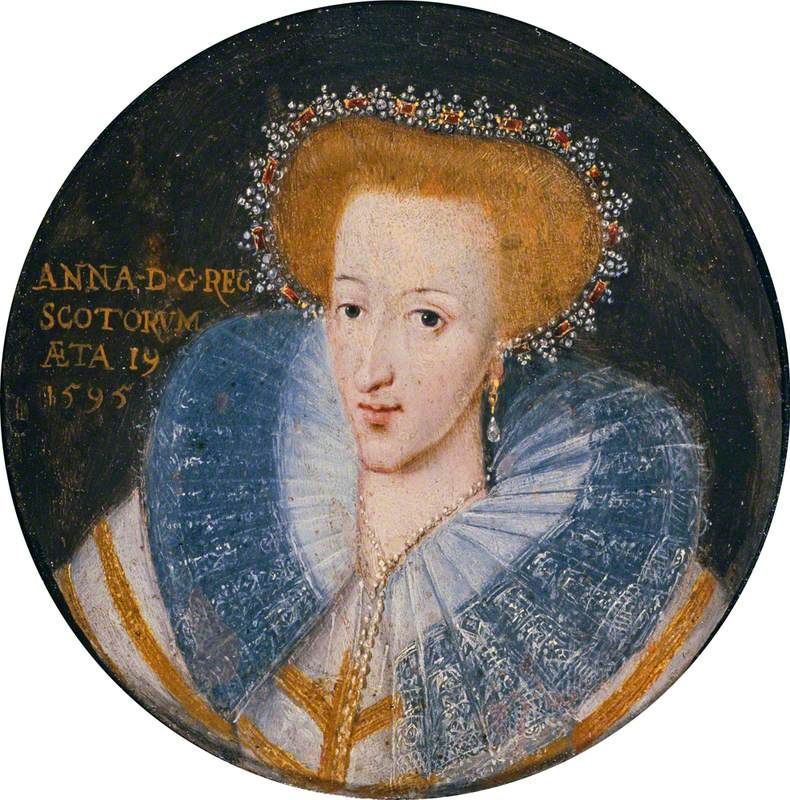
Anna of Denmark, by Adrian Vanson

James VI gave her a psalter, which he had received from Thomas Hay, Commendator of Glenluce.

She was invited to wait on Anne of Denmark at her coronation in May 1590. She joined the queen's household. Her brother John Gibb was a servant of James VI and keeper of Dunfermline Palace.

Like the courtier Katherine Bellenden, who served James V and made his shirts, Elizabeth Gibb sewed and worked fabrics for the king and the queen, especially linen items. Several are mentioned in the royal treasurer's accounts, including "sarks" (shirts) with "necks" (collars) and bands, ruffs, and "hands" (cuffs). She also sewed taffeta and ribbons to dress Anna of Denmark's hair, and made linen caps called "mutches." She embroidered some of these items with gold and silver thread.

More head coverings and veils for the queen made by Gibb, known as "taffetas", with hats and black satin veils for riding wear were recorded in an account made by the textile merchant and financier Robert Jousie. In July 1590 she made three matching crimson velvet hats, for Anna of Denmark, and her two Danish maidens of honour Sofie Koss and Katrine Skinkel. Elizabeth Gibb made snoods and took delivery of a gold "kell" and two silver "kells" for the queen, which were a kind of hair net, and costly at £16 Scots. She made the queen "mussellis and tournets and rydding geir" from black satin, these were masks and face veils to protect her complexion.

Grissell Hamilton was the queen's "Mistress Sewstar", the Mistress of Sewing in the household. From time to time Anna herself was provided with thread to weave, the accounts record, "fine black silk for your Majestie to vewe with."

The Scottish play Philotus, published in 1603, includes a verse describing how the female servants of an aristocratic woman Emilia would make "high candie ruffs", coifs, and kells, "in your house at hame". Emilia, like Anne of Denmark, would wear a "myssell", a mask to guard her complexion outdoors. The play may have been written as early as the 1560s for performance at court, at the wedding of Mary Fleming and William Maitland of Lethington or as a satirical comment on the affection of Thomas Randolph for Mary Beaton.

Elizabeth Gibb died on 10 May 1595 in Leith. Some sources say she died in 1593.

== Family ==
Elizabeth Gibb had twelve children, seven sons and three daughters, including;

- James Young and Henry Young, twins. James was the heir, and became a gentleman of the bedchamber to the king. James Young married firstly Isobel Arbuthnot, and secondly, Jean Stewart.
- Patrick Young
- Peter Young and Robert Young, twins born 10 June 1580 at Stirling Castle. Peter Young junior was part of a diplomatic mission with Lord Spencer to Gustavus Adolphus in 1628. Robert Young was a member of the household of Prince Henry.
- Patrick Young, who was the king's librarian, Rector of Hayes and Lannerage, and a Prebendary of St Paul's.
- John Young (1585–1654), received his MA at the University of St Andrews in 1606, and was elected fellow at Sidney Sussex College, Cambridge. He held various livings, a canonry in Wells Cathedral from 1611, and the deanery of Winchester from 1616 until 1645.
- Michael Young, born 1589.
- Marie or Maria Young, was born in the palace of Stirling Castle on 1 June 1579. She became a lady in waiting to Anne of Denmark, who attended her wedding to John Douglas of Tilliequillie at Holyroodhouse in February 1595. James VI gave her two black velvet gowns as a marriage gift.
- Margaret Young, born at Seaton on 14 November 1581, who married David Lindsay of Kinnettles, Forfarshire.
- Frederick Young and Sophia Johanna Young, twins born January 1587.
- Anna Young, noted in Peter Young's diary as his twelfth child, born February 1591.
