= Grissell Hamilton =

Courtier and textile worker at the royal court of Scotland

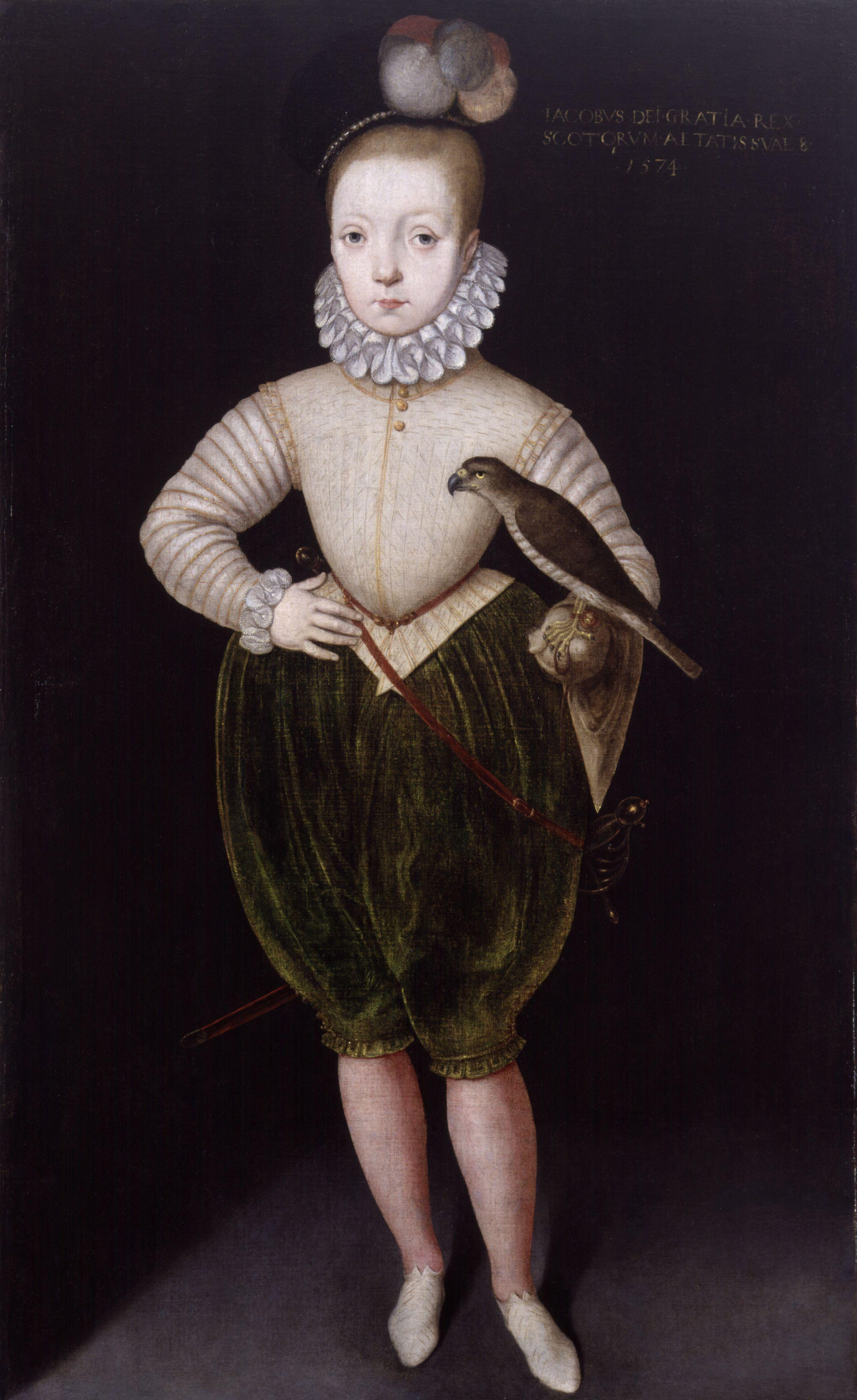
James VI and I in 1574, Rowland Lockey after Arnold Bronckhorst

Grissell Hamilton (died circa 1620) was a courtier and textile worker at the royal court of Scotland. She was known as the "Mistress Sewster" or "Sewstar" and worked to embroider and make linen clothes for James VI and Anne of Denmark.

== Career ==
Grissell or Grizzell Hamilton was a daughter of Andrew Hamilton of Letham (near Strathaven) and Margaret Hamilton, a sister of Andrew Hamilton of Goslington. She was a cousin of Robert Hamilton, who married Elizabeth Baillie, heiress of Provan Hall.

Grissel Gray, a daughter of the king's nurse Helen Littil, was the king's seamstress and "sewstar of oure soverane lordis sarkis". Grissel Hamilton was appointed "Mistress Sewster" to James VI on 21 September 1585 by privy seal letter. "Sewster" is a Scots language word for seamstress, and a shirt was a "sark" or "serk". A record of a payment in 1589 gives Hamilton an alternative title "maistres semistar to the kingis grace".

The King's shirts and bed sheets were made from "fine Holland cloth". Cambric or camerage was used for ruffs and collars, sometime called "necks". Mary, Queen of Scots, bought similar fabrics for her tailor Jean de Compiègne to make shirts for Henry Stuart, Lord Darnley in January 1567. Shirts were made for her father James V by Katherine Bellenden, and her namesake niece, with the seamstress Janet Douglas.

In the 1590, Grissell Hamilton joined the household of Anne of Denmark for a time. The "Mistress Sewster" was listed as a "lady" among the queen's gentlewomen with an allowance of food for herself and her servant in the later 1590s. However, the role of the Queen's "sewster" may have been taken by Elizabeth Gibb (died 1595) when Grissell Hamilton returned to the King's household. Gibb had made the queen's sarks in July 1590 when she moved from Edinburgh to Dunfermline Palace.

Grissel Gray attended the baptism of Prince Henry in August 1594. Henry's first sarks were made by Patrick Murray. Barbara Murray was keeper of his clothes, and Elspeth Crummey or Cromby (Abercromby) was in charge of his linen as his "semister".

== Family ==
Grizzell Hamilton married Captain John Hamilton of Barnwell or Barnweill, a son of William Hamilton of Glenmuir. John Hamilton was a grandson of William Hamilton of Sanquhar who was Provost of Edinburgh. Their children included:

- Margaret Hamilton, who married John Kincaid of Coitts.
