= Henry Wardlaw of Torrie =

Henry Wardlaw of Torrie was a Scottish landowner and courtier.

== Career ==
He was a son of John Wardlaw of Torrie (died June 1557) and Elizabeth Beaton (died 1558), a daughter of John Beaton of Balfour and Mary Boswell. Torrie is in Torryburn parish in Fife.

Elizabeth Beaton, Lady Torrie was a sister of Cardinal David Beaton. In later life John Wardlaw became incapable of managing his affairs. During a court case brought by his younger brother William, witnesses described various details of John Wardlaw's skills and activities as a wealthy laird in Fife.

Henry Wardlaw's daughter Nicolas was a companion of Mary, Queen of Scots, sometimes known as "Madame Torrie". When she married Patrick Wood of Bonnyton in September 1566, the queen's half-brother, James Stewart, 1st Earl of Moray, wrote to the treasurer Robert Richardson to ensure she had a purple velvet gown with gold passments or trimmings as a royal gift for her wedding day.

Henry Wardlaw fought for Mary at the battle of Langside in 1568. He was involved in the death of James Ballany at the battle. Regent Moray declared his property forfeited and gave it to James Cunningham of Drumwuhassill. He was found guilty of treason in August 1571, along with a Fife neighbour Henry Echlin of Pittadro. The penalty was suspended.

== Marriages and children ==
Henry Wardlaw married Alison Hume. His second wife was Katherine Lundy, a daughter of John Lundy of that ilk, a keeper of Stirling Castle

His children included:

- Nicolas Wardlaw, a daughter who was a companion of Mary, Queen of Scots. There were discussions that she might marry David Seton of Parbroath in 1562. She married Patrick Wood of Bonnytoun in Angus. Her daughter Margaret Wood was a lady in waiting of Anne of Denmark.
- Andrew Wardlaw of Torrie, who married Janet Durie, a daughter of Henry Kemp of Thomastoun and Janet Durie. His father granted him the lands of Torrie on 9 June 1566.
- Robert Wardlaw
- Cuthbert Wardlaw in Balmule, who married Katherine Dalgleish. Their son was Henry Wardlaw of Pitreavie
