= John Bellenden (Lord Justice Clerk) =

Sir John Bellenden of Auchnole and Broughton (died 1 October 1576) was, before 1544, Director of Chancery, and was appointed Lord Justice Clerk on 25 June 1547, succeeding his father Thomas Bellenden of Auchnoule. John was knighted before April 1544.

== Career ==
With Sir Robert Carnegie, he agreed an indenture with English commissioners for peace on the Scottish border at Berwick upon Tweed. In 1555 Sir John Bellenden audited accounts for fortifications built by Mary of Guise at Inchkeith. He was a Commissioner for the Treaty of Peace with Anna of Oldenburg, signed at Aberdeen 19 October 1556 confirmed by Mary, Queen of Scots, 26 September 1557. With James MacGill, he prepared a short guide to Scottish law, the Discours Particulier D'Escosse, written in French for Mary, Queen of Scots, and Francis II of France.

After the Siege of Leith, in the articles of the Treaty of Edinburgh, Bellenden was nominated to negotiate the French withdrawal from Scotland on behalf of the Lords of the Congregation.

His brother, Patrick Bellenden of Stenhouse was present at the murder of David Rizzio at Holyrood Palace. Rizzio hid behind Mary, Queen of Scots. John Bellenden was suspected of involvement in the conspiracy. According to Mary, Patrick Bellenden pointed his gun at her pregnant belly. Anthony Standen later wrote that Patrick had threatened the Queen with a dagger. At Mary's orders, Patrick was driven out of Scotland and Orkney by Gilbert Balfour and others. According to the report of Thomas Randolph and the Earl of Bedford, John Bellenden was a suspect on account of his brother's actions. They heard he was replaced as Justice Clerk.

John Bellenden attended at the coronation of King James VI of Scotland on 29 July 1567 at Stirling. On 22 August, there was a public ceremony of inauguration for Regent Moray in Edinburgh, who took an oath before the Justice Clerk at the Tolbooth and was proclaimed by heralds at the Mercat Cross.

In February 1572, during the Marian Civil War, Regent Mar sent him and Robert Colville of Cleish to greet two English ambassadors, Thomas Randolph and William Drury, in Edinburgh and invite them to supper.

Sir John Scot of Scotstarvet, writing in the seventeenth century, tells us that "Sir John made the conquests, and left his eldest son Sir Lewis a fair estate, viz. the barony of Broughton, with the superiority of the Canongate and North Leith, having therein near two thousand vassals; the baronies of Auchnoul, Woodhouslie, Abbot's-grange, and many others. And to the eldest son of the third marriage he left the barony of Carlowrie, (Linlithgowshire), and Kilconquhar, Fife, and diverse lands about Brechin."

== Family ==
Sir John married three times:

1. Marion (or Margaret) Scott, by whom he had three daughters. Two died young and the third, Marion (d. 1604), married John Ramsay of Dalhousie. This was probably the wedding in October 1564, three miles from Edinburgh, described by Thomas Randolph.
2. Barbara Kennedy, daughter of Sir Hugh Kennedy of Girvanmains by his spouse Janet Stewart, daughter to John Stewart, 2nd Earl of Atholl. The contract was signed by the Regent Mary of Guise herself on 30 September 1555. Barbara was a lady-in-waiting to the Queen Regent, who bought a black velvet gown for her. Guise contributed £266-13s-4d to her a dowry in October 1555. At this time, her father was employed by Guise on a military mission in the north against the Clan Mackay, and John Bellenden was working with the Regent at her justice ayres in Dumfries and Jedburgh. They had four sons and one daughter. They were;
  1. Sir Lewis Bellenden of Auchnole & Broughton, Lord Justice Clerk, John's heir.
  2. Adam Bellenden, Bishop of Aberdeen.
  3. William Bellenden, Vicar of Kilconquhar.
  4. Thomas Bellenden of Kilconquhar, Fife, a Senator of the College of Justice (14 August 1591).
  5. Annabella Bellenden, married before June 1599, as his second wife, Sir Alexander Lauder of Haltoun, Sheriff Principal of Edinburghshire.

His third marriage, to Jonet Seton, was in January 1565. She was a gentlewoman of Mary's bed chamber and was given a purple velvet gown with gold trimming.
