= Dowhill Castle =

Ruined castle in Scotland

- Perth and Kinross, Scotland
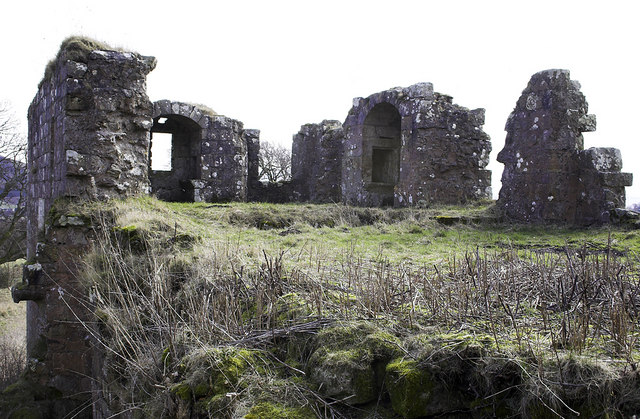
- Ruins of Dowhill Castle (first storey)

Site information
- Type: Castellated square peel tower and barmkin
- Owner: The Dowhill estate
- Open to the public: No
- Condition: Ruined

Location
- Location within Perth and Kinross
- Coordinates: 56°09′37″N 3°25′19″W

Site history
- Built: c.1500
- Materials: Stone
- Events

Scheduled monument
- Official name: Dowhill Castle
- Designated: 22 June 1936
- Reference no.: SM997

Listed Building – Category B
- Official name: Dowhill Castle
- Designated: 5 October 1971 to 16 December 2015
- Reference no.: LB5714

Dowhill Castle is a ruined castle in Perth and Kinross, Scotland. Sited on a hill near Loch Leven, the oldest part of the castle was built in around 1500 as a tower house. The main structure was extended in around 1600 with additional living space, as well as a tower and turret. The castle had a fortified courtyard (barmkin) to the north with a separate tower. There were probably four storeys but only two still survive.

The site was owned for many years by the Crambeth family before it passed to the Lindsay family, who built the castle, at the end of the fourteenth century. A series of legal decisions impoverished the Lindsays and they were forced to sell their estate and castle to William Adam in the mid eighteenth century. Though still fit for use as a gentleman's residence, Adam used the castle to house labourers. The structure decayed into ruin and was given by Adam to his son Robert Adam. The latter Adam, an architect, is thought to have been inspired by the castle in his designs for Seton, Dalquharran, and Culzean castles. The stonework at Dowhill was quarried in the nineteenth century until only the ground floor and part of the first floor remained. The castle received protection as an ancient monument in 1936 and a listed building in 1971.

== Architecture ==
Dowill Castle was a castellated peel tower built in an approximate square shape. Its ruins stand on a hill overlooking Loch Leven and the surrounding countryside. The earliest part of the castle was a rectangular tower house of three or four storeys built in around 1500 that now makes up part of the east end of Dowhill Castle. The 1500 structure was oblong in shape, measuring 10.7 metres (35 ft) by 7.9 metres (26 ft). Its walls were 1.6 metres (5 ft 3 in) thick on average. The building's entrance was on the southern wall and the staircase in the south-eastern corner. The ground floor was a large, vaulted room with a single slit window to the north, and a mezzanine floor, accessed off the turnpike stair. The first floor (the top surviving floor) was a single-room hall. Its fireplace was probably on the west side, with windows in the other three walls. A garderobe was provided at the eastern end of the north wall. Set into the floor of a closet in the north-east of the hall was a hatch that provided access to a pit in the thickness of the exterior wall that was used as a prison. This had a small opening for ventilation, a recess to hold a lamp and a urinal. There is evidence that the original castle was planned as a smaller structure but was increased in height mid-way through construction.

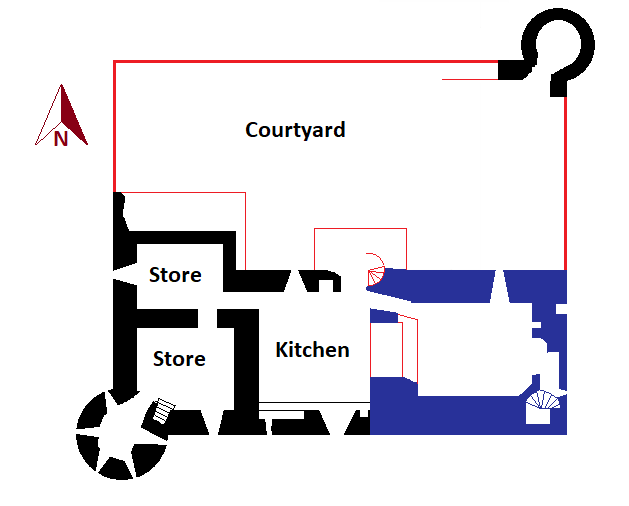
Plan of surviving structure of ground floor. The presumed line of original features shown in red; the original (1500) castle structure is shown in blue.

In around 1600 the castle was extended by 12.8 metres (42 ft) westwards. A round tower was built on the south-west corner of the extended structure and a short wing survives projecting northwards from the west end of the building that formed part of a fortified barmkin enclosing that side of the structure. At some point a rubble-built tower was constructed on the north-east corner of the barmkin and a pepperbox turret was added to the west wall.

During the extension works the existing entrance was bricked up and a new entrance provided in the north wall of the extension. The castle's original kitchen, situated in the western portion of the ground floor, was replaced by a larger facility in the eastern portion of the extension. The original tower's hall is also likely to have been replaced by a larger room on the first floor of the extension, to which the old hall acted as an antechamber. The stairs in the extension's south-west tower became the principal means of access, replacing the staircase in the south-east of the original tower house. The extension probably rose to four storeys but only the lower two survive.

The castle had a vaulted basement which contained a large fire that heated the rest of the building through a chimney. Much of the lower levels of the castle were lit only with holes and slits in the walls while higher levels had glazed windows. During the 1600 extension a number of quatrefoil holes were added between the existing ground-floor windows. The masonry throughout the building, including the windows and vaulted ceilings, has been praised as superior in style to most examples found in Scotland.

== History ==
Coat of arms of the Lindsays of Dowhill

The land on which Dowhill Castle stands was originally owned by the Crambeth family who lived there for many generations, including the thirteenth century bishop Matthew de Crambeth. The land passed into the ownership of a branch of the Lindsay family in around 1398, who built the castle and became the feudal barons of Dowhill in 1412 when that title was given to William Lindsay by the Crambeths.

According to Adam Blackwood, Patrick Lindsay, laird of Dowhill warned Mary, Queen of Scots, of a plot to kidnap her and Lord Darnley as they travelled nearby in June 1565. The Lindsays still occupied the castle in 1592 when James Lindsay and Elizabeth Colville married there. The family was persecuted for their support of the Covenanters in the seventeenth century and thereafter their affluence severely decreased.

After a series of legal disputes further impoverished the Lindsays, the thirteenth feudal baron, James Lindsay, was forced to sell much of his estates; in 1731 the land surrounding the castle was purchased by the architect William Adam so that he could build up his own estate. The castle itself was purchased by Adam in 1740. While the castle was still "fit for the habitation of a Gentleman's family" at the time of his purchase, Adam did not want to become a Scottish laird and instead constructed his own house, Blairadam, and gave the castle over as accommodation for his labourers.

After this the castle continued to decay, with a small house being built against the south wall and the north-east tower being used as a dovecote. The ruins of the castle were thought to be romantic, with the scene it created helping to form the architectural ideals of Adam's son, Robert Adam, who was given the castle by his father at the age of 11. Robert sketched the castle in 1744, at the age of 16 and later styled himself "Robert Adam of Dowhill". Dowhill has been cited as one of the inspirations behind his designs of the castles of Seton, Dalquharran, and Culzean. In 1817 his son, William Adam, showed the castle to the poet Sir Walter Scott as part of the tour that influenced his novel The Abbott; Adam described Dowhill at this time as "my own little castle". Later in the nineteenth century the ruins were used for quarrying, with a large hole being created in the south wall of the castle from which stone was taken.

By 1888 all that remained of the castle was the vaulted basement and the first floor of the castle itself, with some stonework from the castle thought to have been reused during the construction of Blairadam House. Dowhill became an attraction of architectural interest, with it by the end of the nineteenth century being included on annual excursions of the Edinburgh Architectural Association. The castle was made a scheduled monument in 1936 and a category B listed building in 1971; the listed building status was removed in 2015 as current policy is not to list buildings on two registers. While the remains of the castle are in good condition and have even been investigated for renovation, the site is not generally open to the public due to health and safety risks. The castle continued to be owned by, and to be part of, the Blairadam estate into the late nineteenth century, but ownership has since changed, and as of 2002 the castle was part of the Dowhill estate, which also includes the nearby Dowhill House.
