= Patrick Young =

Scottish scholar and royal librarian

Patrick Young (29 August 1584 – 7 September 1652), also known as Patricius Junius, was a Scottish scholar and royal librarian to King James VI and I, and King Charles I. He was a noted Biblical and patristic scholar.

== Life ==
He was born at Seton, Angus, Scotland, He was a son of Peter Young, tutor to James alongside George Buchanan, and Elizabeth Gibb. He was educated at the University of St. Andrews (M.A., 1603). He then became librarian and secretary to George Lloyd, the future Bishop of Chester, in 1603. He was incorporated at Oxford (1605), and, taking holy orders, became a chaplain of All Souls College.

He was then librarian successively to Prince Henry, James I, and Charles I; at the same time he undertook diplomatic correspondence. He was Latin secretary to Bishop John Williams, 1624. He became rector of Llanynys, Denbighshire, in 1623; and he was rector of Hayes, Middlesex, from 1623 to 1647.

== Works ==
In July 1605 King James sent his unpublished manuscript Historie of the Churche to Robert Cecil, 1st Earl of Salisbury. James had composed the work at Dalkeith Palace in the 1580s. This manuscript however had been written by Patrick Young following a copy made by John Geddie. James apologised that the language of this copy had been corrupted first by the version of Scots used by Geddie, and then by Patrick Young's attempts to convert the text into English spelling. He joked that the result was like the Welsh spoken by the courtier Roger Aston, who was from Cheshire.

Around 1622 he made a catalogue of manuscripts in Salisbury Cathedral. In 1622 he was ordered to undertake a survey of old manuscripts in English churches and make extracts for King James.

He was an eminent scholar in Greek; and he was asked to catalogue the Greek manuscripts of Giacomo Barocci, numbering around 250, that had been donated in 1629 to the Bodleian Library by their purchaser William Herbert, 3rd Earl of Pembroke.

He was entrusted with the revision of the Codex Alexandrinus of the Septuagint. He made contributions to Brian Walton’s Polyglot Bible, in the annotations (Vol. VI).

He was responsible for the editio princeps of Clement of Rome's two “Epistles to the Corinthians” (1633 and 1637) In 1637 he published a catena of the Greek Fathers on the Book of Job, attributed to Nicetas, and in 1639 a commentary on Canticles, based on that of Gilbert Foliot

His book collection passed to Thomas Gale.
