= Snood (headgear) =

Coarse, decorative hairnet

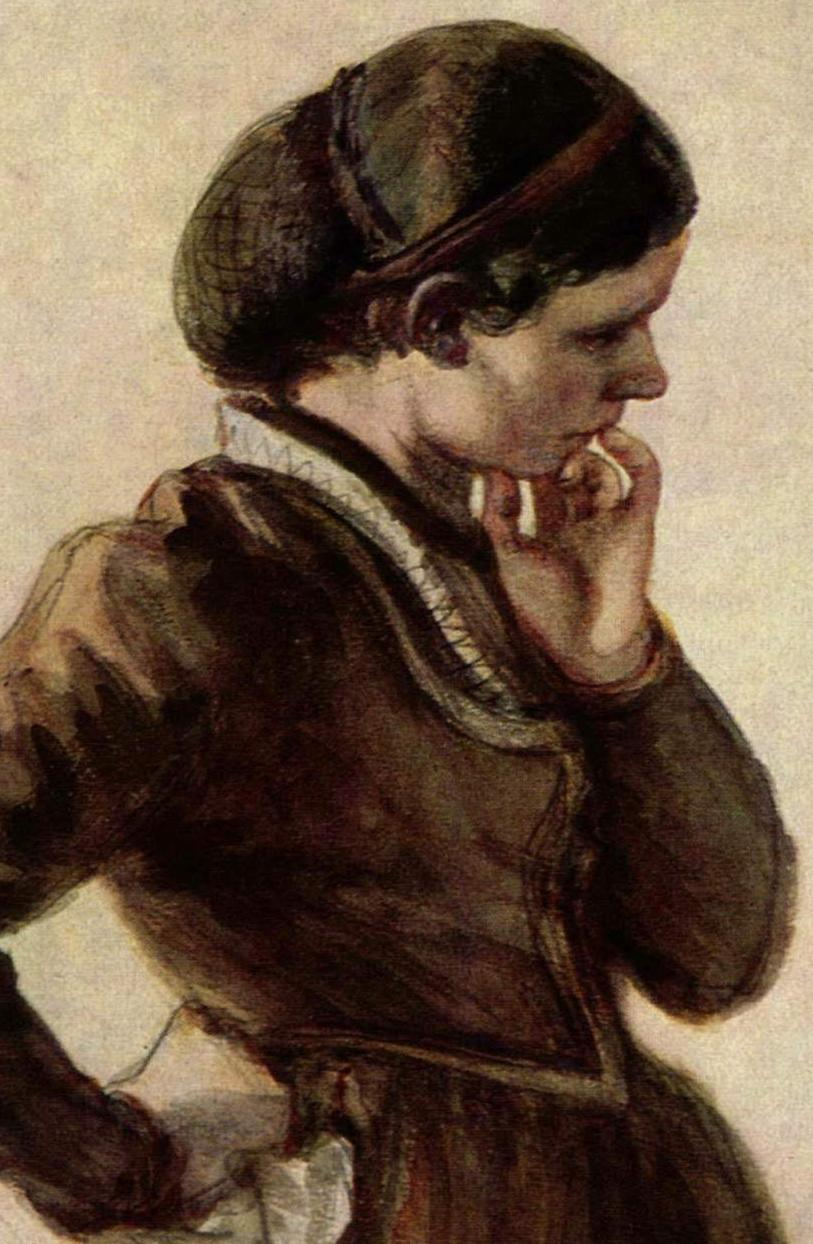
19th century painting of a woman wearing a snood (by Adolph Menzel)

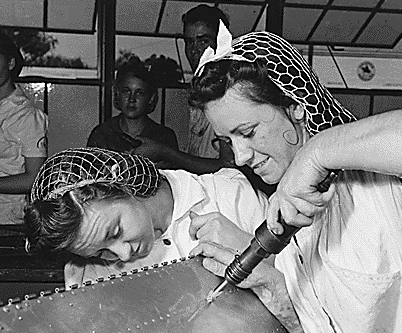
Two women working at a Texas Naval Air Base in 1942, wearing hairnets (snoods)

A snood (/snuːd/) is a type of traditionally female headgear, with two types known. The long-gone Scottish snood was a circlet made of ribbon worn by young Scottish women as a symbol of chastity. In the 1590s, Elizabeth Gibb made snoods of Florentine silk ribbon for the gentlewomen at the court of Anne of Denmark (the wife of King James VI of Scotland).

The other type sought to hold the hair in a cloth or net-like hat. In the most common form, the headgear resembles a close-fitting hood worn over the back of the head. It is similar to a hairnet, but a snood typically has a looser fit.

Decorative hairnets, popular among women in the Victorian era, were referred to as snoods. This term was then applied to any netlike hat, and, in the 1930s, to a net bag headgear. This latter meaning became popular during the Second World War of 1939 to 1945, when women joined the workforce en masse and often had to wear headgear to avoid their hair getting caught by the moving parts of factory machinery.

For a short time during WWII, snoods stood at the height of fashion (a hit of Paris collections in 1939).

== Beard snood ==
Another similar garment which is also referred to as a snood is used to cover facial hair such as beards and moustaches when working in environments such as food production. Although it appears that "hairnet" has replaced "snood" as the common term for hair containment on the head, the term "beard snood" (essentially a "ringed scarf") is still familiar in many food production facilities.

== Religious use ==
Women's snoods are often worn by married Orthodox Jewish women, according to the religious requirement of hair covering (see Tzniut). Since these snoods are designed to cover the hair more than hold it, they are often lined to prevent them from being see-through. Contemporary hair snoods for Jewish women come in a wide range of colors and designs.

In the 21st century, women use snoods primarily for religious reasons.

== Sources ==
- Blum, Dilys E. (1993). "Ahead of Fashion: Hats of the 20th Century". Philadelphia Museum of Art Bulletin. 89 (377/378). Philadelphia Museum of Art: 1–48. ISSN 0031-7314. JSTOR 3795480.
- Lynch, A.; Strauss, M.D.; Eicher, J.B.; Bradley, L.A.; Braithwaite, N.; Buckridge, S.O.; Camerlengo, L.L.; Colburn, C.A.; Collins, V.; Craik, J. (2014). "Snood". Ethnic Dress in the United States: A Cultural Encyclopedia. Rowman & Littlefield Publishers. pp. 276–277. ISBN 978-0-7591-2150-8.
