= George Conn (priest) =

George Conn (Latin: Conæus; died 1640) was a Scottish Roman Catholic priest, a Franciscan and papal diplomat in England.

== Early life ==
Conn was a catholic brought up by his father, Patrick Conn of Auchry, near Turriff, Aberdeenshire; his mother was Isabella Chyn of Esselmont. When he was very young, he was sent to be educated at Douay, from which he went to the Scots College in Paris, and Rome. He completed his education at the University of Bologna, where the Duke of Mirandola engaged him as a tutor for his son.

Conn went to Rome in the summer of 1623, to work in the household of Cardinal Alessandro Peretti di Montalto, who left him a legacy on his death at the end of the year. He then transferred his services as secretary to Cardinal Francesco Barberini, and accompanied him when he went to France as nuncio. He was subsequently made canon of St Lawrence in Damaso and secretary to the Congregation of Rites. He also joined the Franciscan Order.

== Papal agent ==
Conn filled the place of papal agent at the court of Queen Henrietta Maria, vacated because of Gregorio Panzani's return to Italy. He landed at Rye, East Sussex on 17 July 1636 (O.S.).

Conn took his mission to be to gain individual Catholic converts, and to make use of his position at court to ameliorate the lot of the English Roman Catholics. He stirred up the queen to give active support to the spread of Catholicism. In October 1637 the conversion of Anne, Lady Newport, wife of Mountjoy Blount, 1st Earl of Newport and daughter of Lord Boteler, brought matters to a head. King Charles was urged by William Laud to enforce the laws against conversion Catholicism, but the queen, at Conn's urging, pleaded with the King to be lenient. In the end, a proclamation was issued against conversion, but its terms were so mild that the queen did not object. King Charles favoured Conn on a personal level.

== Death ==
Conn remained in England until the summer of 1639; he was in poor health. His death took place at Rome, according to the monument erected to his memory in the church of St. Lawrence in Damaso by Cardinal Barberini, on 10 January 1640 (N.S.).

== Works ==
- In 1621, George Con published Praemetiae, sive Calumniae Hirlandorum indicatae, et epos... auctore Georgio Conaeo at the Tebaldini Press in Bologna.

Conn wrote a life of Mary Stuart, published in 1624.

In 1628 he wrote Georgii Conaei de dvplici statv religionis apvd Scotos libri duo; it was published in Rome by the Vatican Press. He also wrote a book entitled, Georgii Conæi Assertionum catholicarum libri tres. In quibus ex solo scripto Dei verbo præcipua hæresum ætatis nostræ dogmata refelluntur. It was published in Rome in 1629 by the Zannetti firm.

== Notes ==
Attribution

This article incorporates text from a publication now in the public domain: Stephen, Leslie, ed. (1887). "Conn, George". Dictionary of National Biography. Vol. 12. London: Smith, Elder & Co.
