= Cleish Castle =

Coordinates: 56.1655°N 3.4792°W

Designations

Inventory of Gardens and Designed Landscapes in Scotland
- Official name: Cleish Castle
- Designated: 31 March 2006
- Reference no.: GDL00102

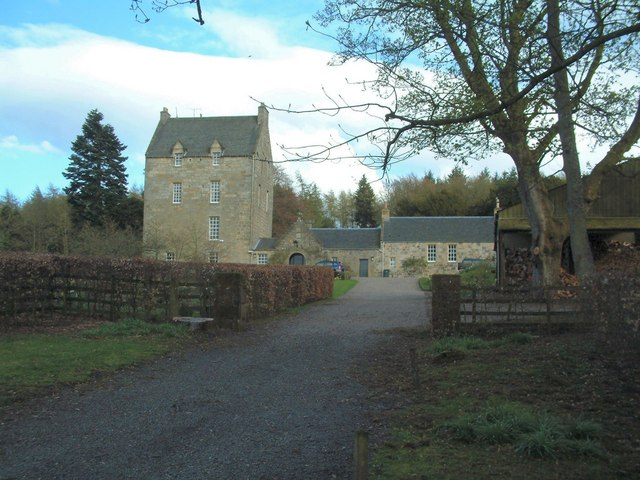
Cleish Castle

Cleish Castle is a 16th-century tower house in Kinross-shire, Scotland. It is sited 5 kilometres (3.1 mi) south-west of Kinross and 1 kilometre (0.62 mi) west of the hamlet of Cleish. It was built by the Colville family, who owned it until 1775. It was restored and remodelled in the mid 19th century, and restored again in the 20th century. It remains a private residence and is a category A listed building. The grounds of the castle are included in the Inventory of Gardens and Designed Landscapes in Scotland, the national listing of significant Scottish gardens.

== History ==
The Colvilles' ownership of the barony of Cleish is recorded from 1537, when it was granted to Robert Colville by his father, Sir James Colville of Easter Wemyss. The tower is described as "a fine example of a 16th-century tower house", and was extended and heightened in the early 17th century. Upper dormers bear the date 1600. Robert's son John Colville conspired against James VI, taking part in the Ruthven Raid and later joining with Francis Stewart, 5th Earl of Bothwell, in an attack on Holyroodhouse.

Cleish was sold to the Graham family of Kinross in 1775, and sold again around 20 years later to the Young family. It was derelict before 1840, and was then restored later in a Scots baronial style. The reconstruction was undertaken by the Edinburgh architect John Lessels, who also designed additions to the castle in around 1870. In the 1970s it was again remodelled, though further work in the 1990s removed most of the later additions, and in 2001 the western extension was replaced.
