= West Seaton House =

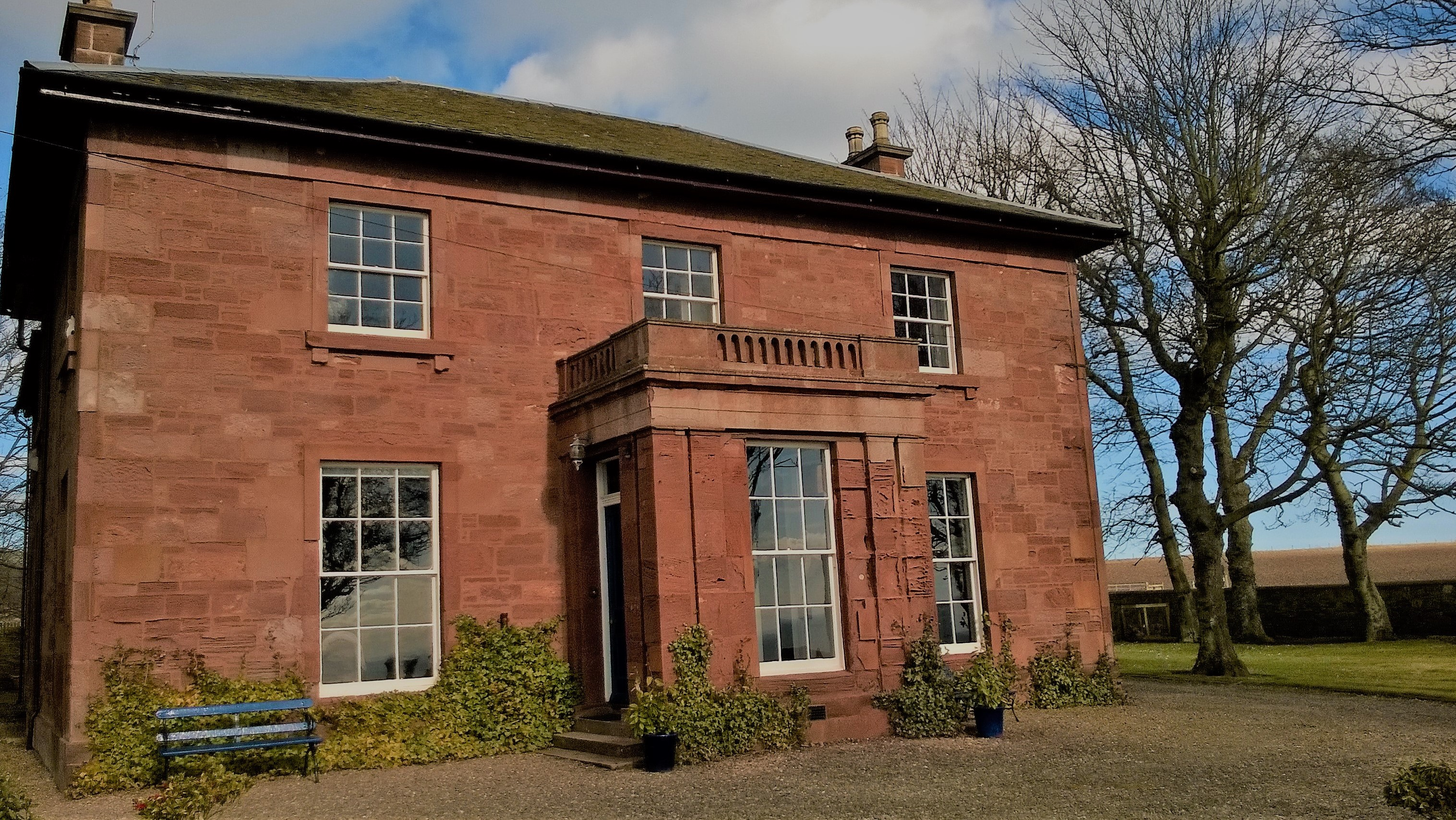

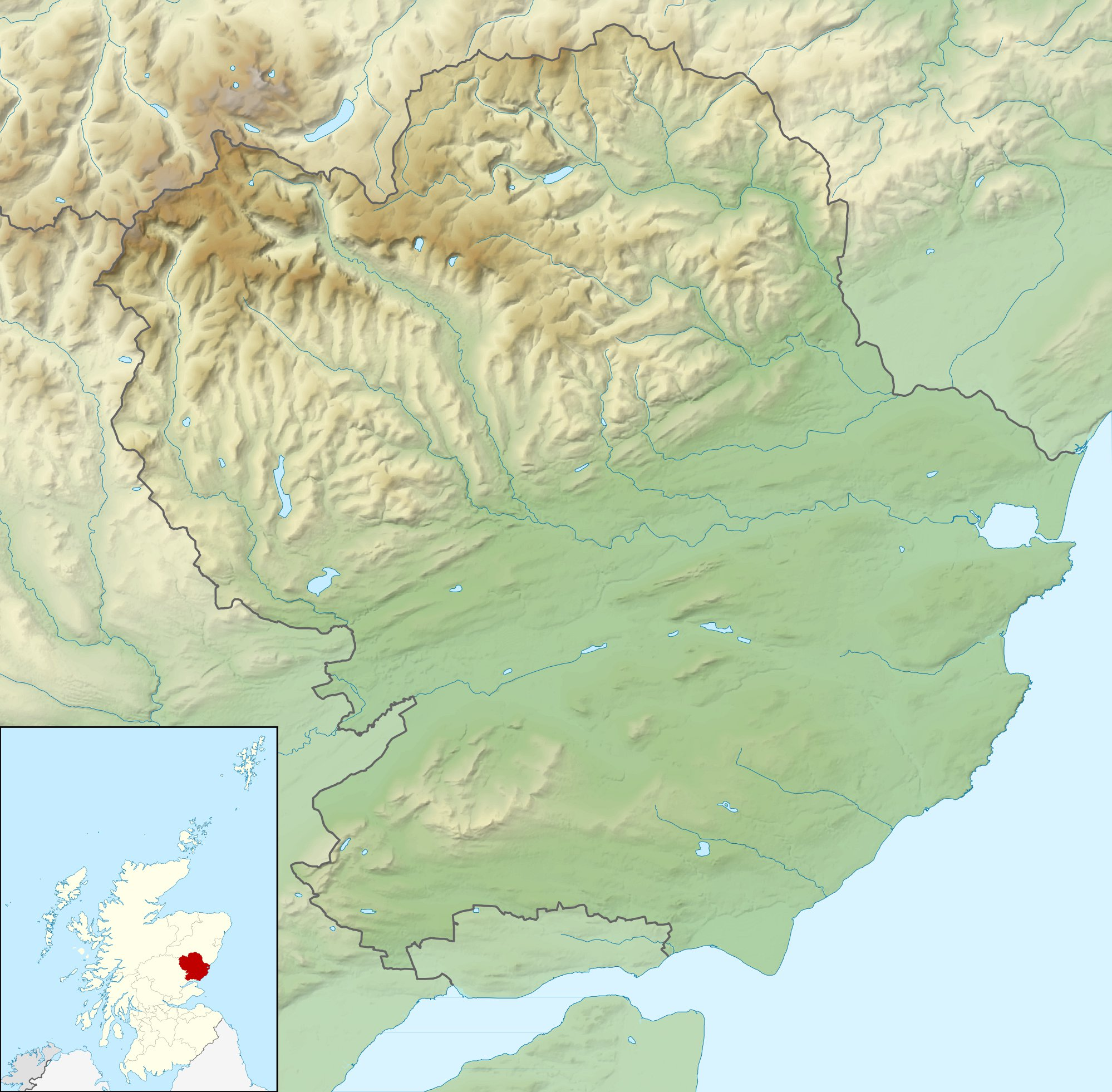
- Location within Angus
- 56.5653°N 2.5576°W
- Type: House
- Location: St Vigeans, Angus, Scotland

History
- Built: early 19th century

Site notes
- Architectural style: Regency
- Governing body: Privately owned

Listed Building – Category B
- Official name: West Seaton Farmhouse
- Designated: 11 June 1971
- Reference no.: LB4749

West Seaton House is a listed building of late Regency design, situated approximately one mile (1.6 km) to the east of Arbroath in the parish of St. Vigeans, in the county of Angus in Scotland. Prior to 2009 the house was known as West Seaton Farmhouse.

== History ==
In 1840 farmlands at West Seaton were owned by the trustees of Thomas Renny Strachan of Tarry who was a descendant of Sir David Carnegie of Kinnaird. The trustees engaged the Dundee-based architect David MacKenzie I, who was regarded as a very competent Gothic designer, to produce plans and specifications for a house to be called West Seaton Farmhouse. Estimates for completing the house were sought via an advertisement in the Dundee, Perth and Cupar Advertiser dated 22 May 1840.

== Structure ==
The house is of classic design with two-storeys, ashlar walls in the local pink sandstone, a slate roof and a projecting porch. On 11 June 1971 the house was category B listed by the Secretary of State.
