= Claude de l'Isle de Marivaux =

16th-century French diplomat

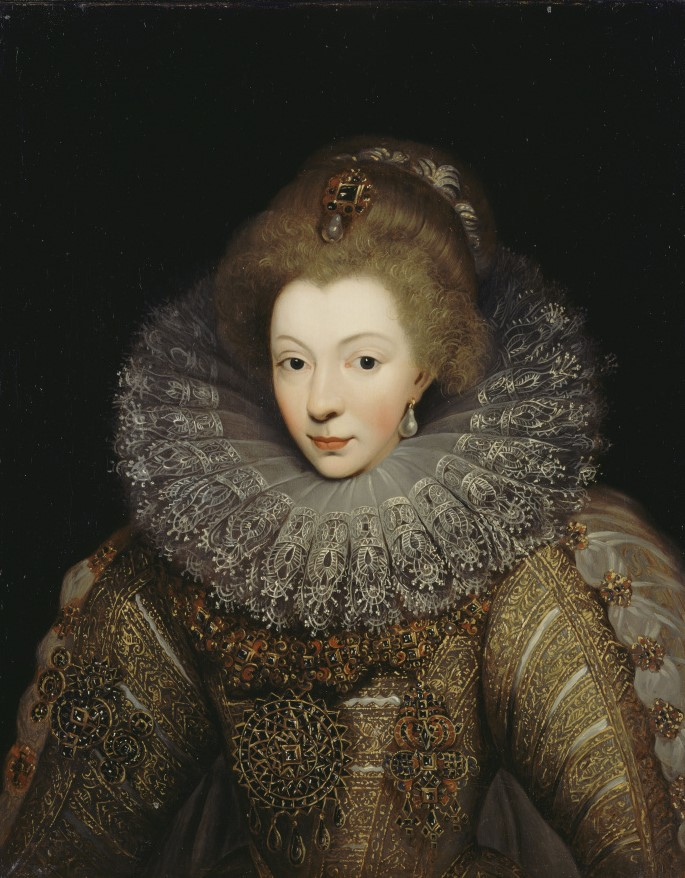
De l'Isle was sent to Scotland to arrange a marriage between Catherine de Bourbon and James VI

Claude de l'Isle de Marivaux (d. 1598) was a French diplomat working for Henry of Navarre.

Claude was a son of Jean de l'Isle de Marivaux and Hélène d'Aspremont, Lady of Tullin and Trassereux. They rebuilt the Château de Troissereux in renaissance style.

Claude, who was governor of Laon and Lieutenant-general of the government of the Île-de-France, Chamberlain to the king's brother Francis, Duke of Anjou, and Captain of the castle and town of Arques, was known as "Marivaux le Sage", the wise.

== Mission to Scotland ==
Claude came to Scotland in April 1588. His mission was concerned with a plan for James VI of Scotland to marry the sister of Henry of Navarre, Catherine de Bourbon. He was recommended for this role by the poet Guillaume de Salluste Du Bartas, who was strongly in favour of the marriage and praised the qualities of the "handsome, brave, eloquent, active, and discreet" king of the Scots to Henry.

In September 1588 Claude wrote two letters to James VI, one from Lennoxlove, then called Lethington, the home of John Maitland, 1st Lord Maitland of Thirlestane, the other from Edinburgh, to thank him for gifts. These included 200 French gold crowns and a diamond ring which were recorded in Maitland's accounts of money from the English subsidy. Claude wrote to the Laird of Wemyss, who was busy with hare and hound, to ask James to conclude their business and give him leave to go. James VI gave him a letter for Catherine de Bourbon, saying he would like to visit her and declare his intentions, and assured of his constant love.

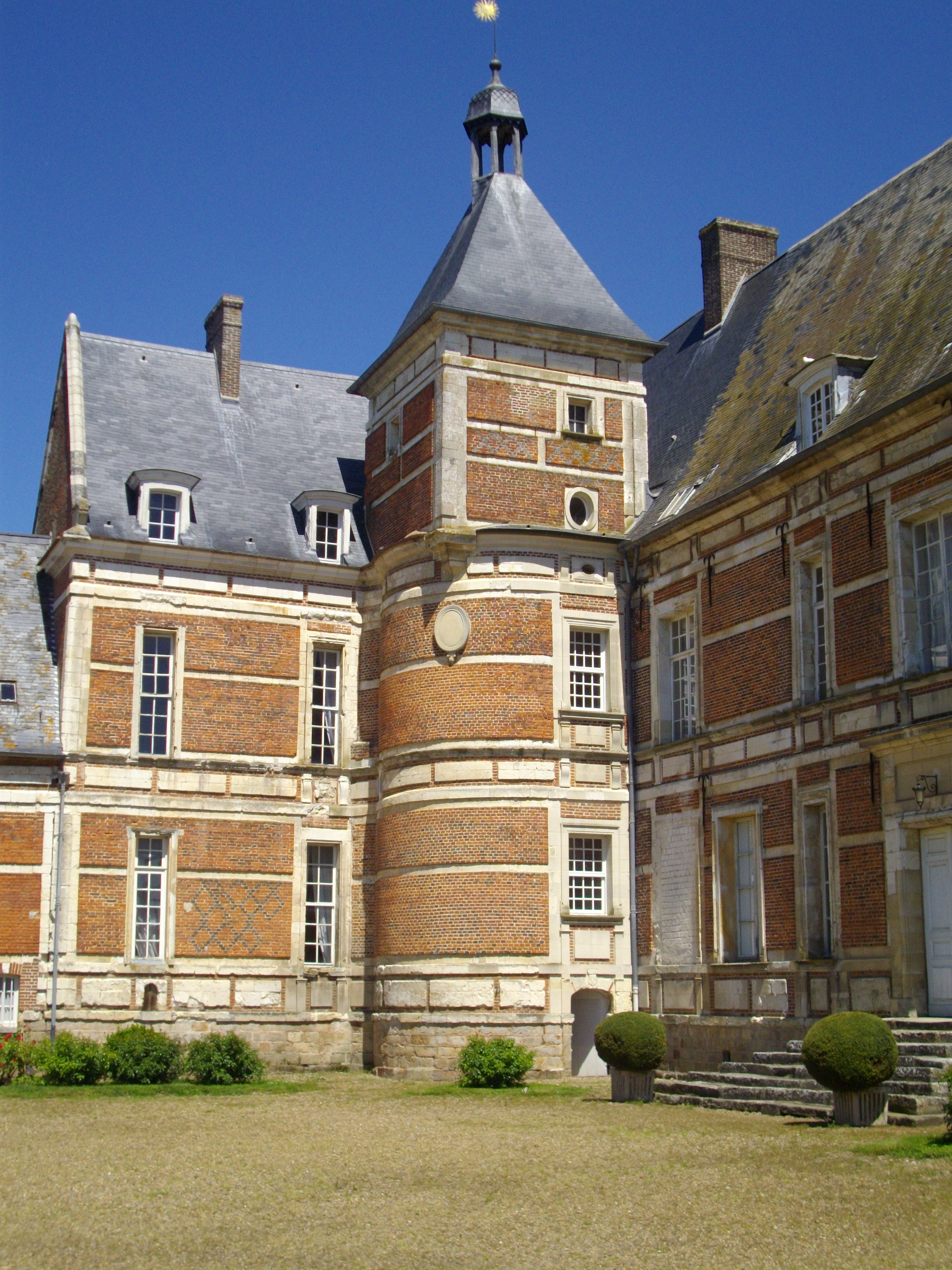
Stairtower at the Château de Troissereux

Claude carried a letter from the English diplomat in Edinburgh, William Ashby, to Francis Walsingham which mentions that he would tell him about the wreck of a ship from the Spanish Armada on Islay or Mull. Claude had heard this news at Stirling Castle from a letter sent to the king by Lachlan Mor Maclean.

In London Claude gave James's letters to two envoys of Navarre, Paul Choart, Sieur de Buzenval, and François de Quincampoix, Sieur de Moy, who sent to king a copy of his paper on the 'Spanish Army'. Claude wrote to James VI from London complaining because he did not have a letter of personal credit to Catherine to permit him to discuss James's letter with her. He wished James might spare an hour to have his portrait painted for him. Claude got an interview with Catherine, and she wrote to James, thanking him for the letter. Henry sent Claude on a mission to Béarn.

English politicians remained in favour of the Navarre marriage, although James VI was negotiating for a Danish bride. William Cecil wrote in July 1589, "The King of Scots is wooing the King of Denmark's daughter, but we could better like the match with the King of Navarre's sister".

=== Clermont d'Amboise ===
Another envoy Monsieur Clermont d'Amboise arrived in July 1588, pretending to have been driven to the west coast of Scotland by a storm. He was hosted by the town of Edinburgh for four days and there was a banquet at his departure involving claret, sweet wine, "drogs and sweitt meitt." James VI gave him a jewel worth 200 French crowns.

=== Jérôme Groslot ===
Jérôme Groslot, Sieur de l'Isle was sent to Scotland in April 1589 to advocate the Navarre marriage. To avoid confusion with Claude, as both were called "de l'Isle", Jérôme was sometimes known as "the son of the Baillie of Orleans". He had been brought up with James VI at Stirling Castle. John Colville wrote to the Laird of Wemyss that James VI was set on the Danish marriage and l'Isle's efforts were likely to be in vain. When he left in July James gave him 200 French crowns to fund his journey to Navarre with James's answers.

In March 1589 yet another envoy from Navarre, François de Civille, arrived in Edinburgh, hoping to recruit troops. An English man at the Scottish court Thomas Fowler wrote that Civille and Groslot, Sieur de l’Isle encouraged Edinburgh merchants who dealt with France to support the Navarre marriage. James VI decided to marry Anne of Denmark.

Another diplomat in Scotland, Jean Hotman de Villiers, was with James VI at Falkland Palace in August 1589. The king gave him a ring with a diamond star and another jewel worth 100 gold crowns.

== Later life ==
Claude fought for Henry at the Battle of Ivry in March 1590.

He died in 1598.

== Family ==
Claude married Catherine Béatrix du Moustier, the widow of Jean-Galéas de Saint-Séverin, Count of Gayasse. They had seven children, five daughters were living at his death on 17 May 1598, Renée, Marguerite, and Catherine, and the nuns Leonore and Claude.

Marguerite married Jean de Lameth, Seigneur de Bournonville. Renée married François de Hallencourt, Seigneur de Drosmesnil. Catherine married Antoine de Senicourt, Seigneur de Saisseval et Warmoise. They feuded over their inheritance, and François de Hallencourt was killed by a servant of Jean de Lameth in 1609.
