= English subsidy of James VI =

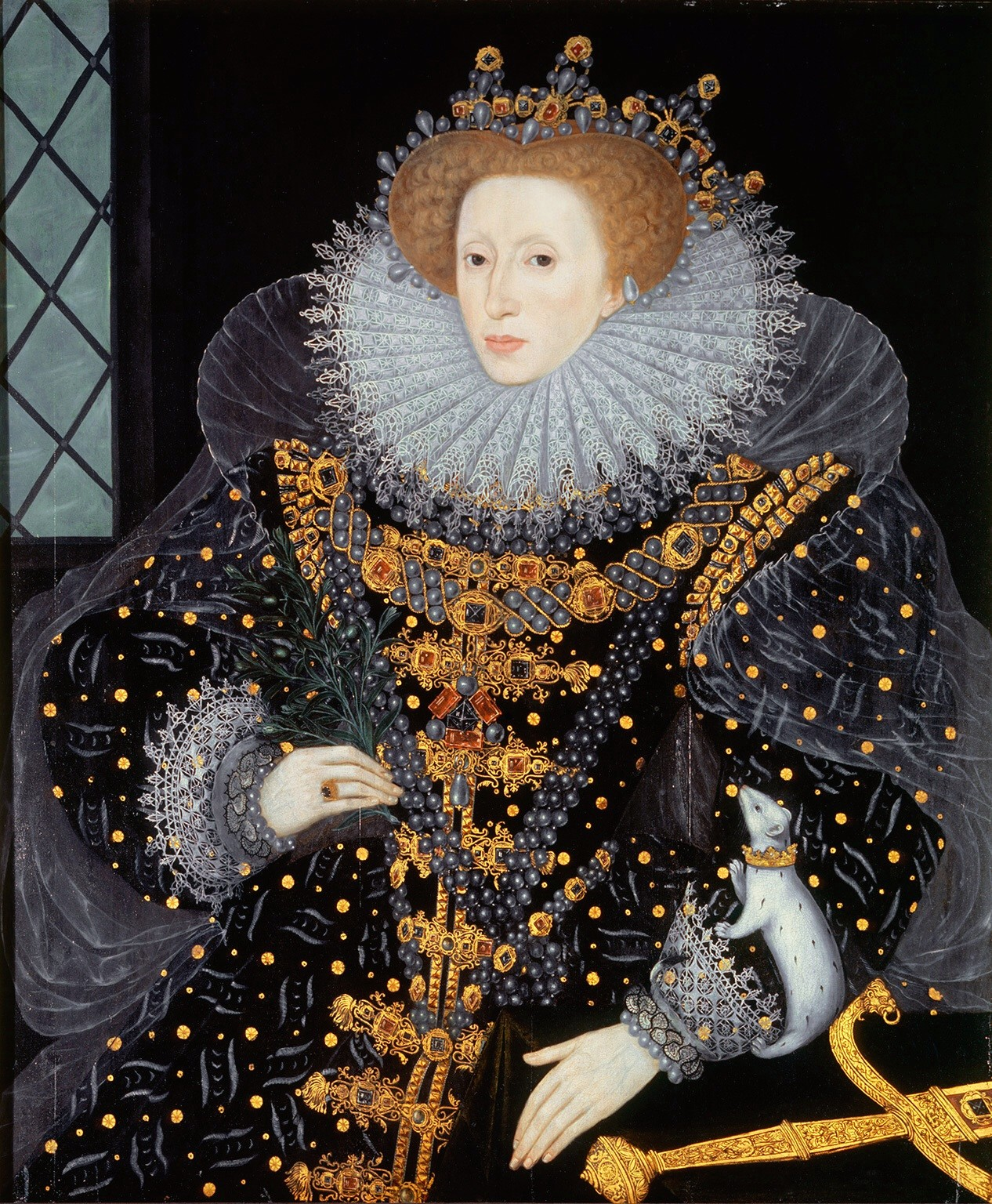
Elizabeth I, wearing the Three Brothers jewel, the Ermine portrait at Hatfield House

Queen Elizabeth I of England paid a subsidy to King James VI of Scotland from 1586 to 1602. This enabled her to influence James by delaying or deferring payments to his diplomats in London. Records survive of the yearly amounts, and details of the expenditure in some years. A large proportion of the money in 1589 was spent on the royal wedding and in subsequent years on the royal wardrobe of James and Anne of Denmark. Some royal expenses were met by Anne of Denmark's dowry, which was known as the "tocher". The regular incomes of the Scottish crown were feudal rents, customs, and "compositions" charged on grants of land. Accounts for royal incomes and payments survive as the exchequer rolls and lord treasurer's accounts and have been published as historical sources.

== A gift with consequences ==
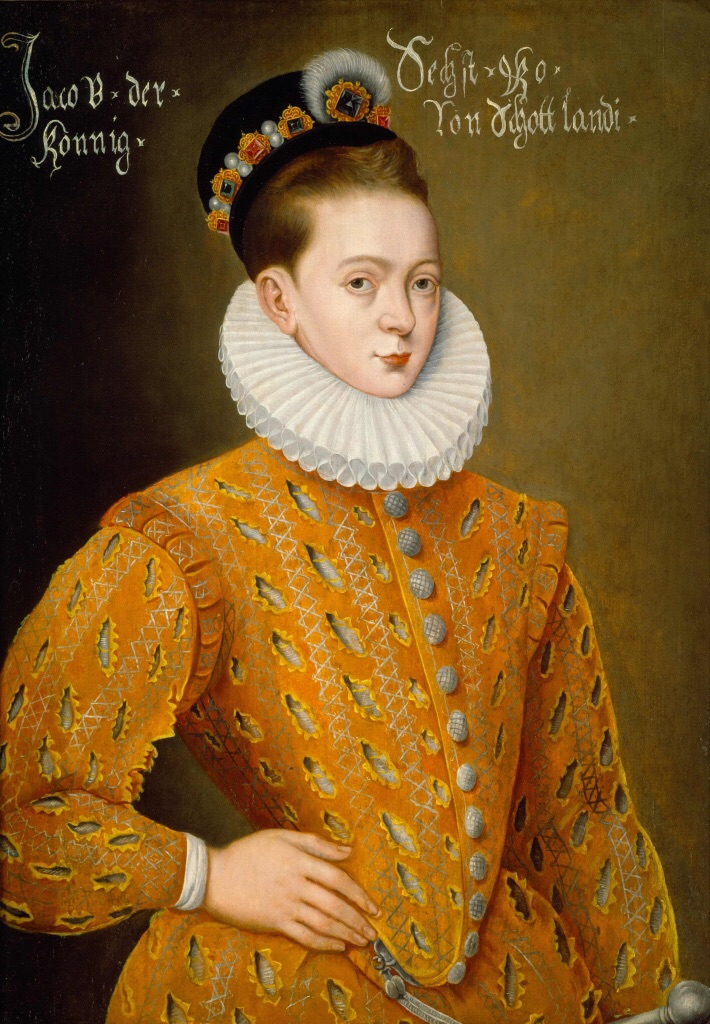
James VI and I, attributed to Adrian Vanson, Edinburgh Castle

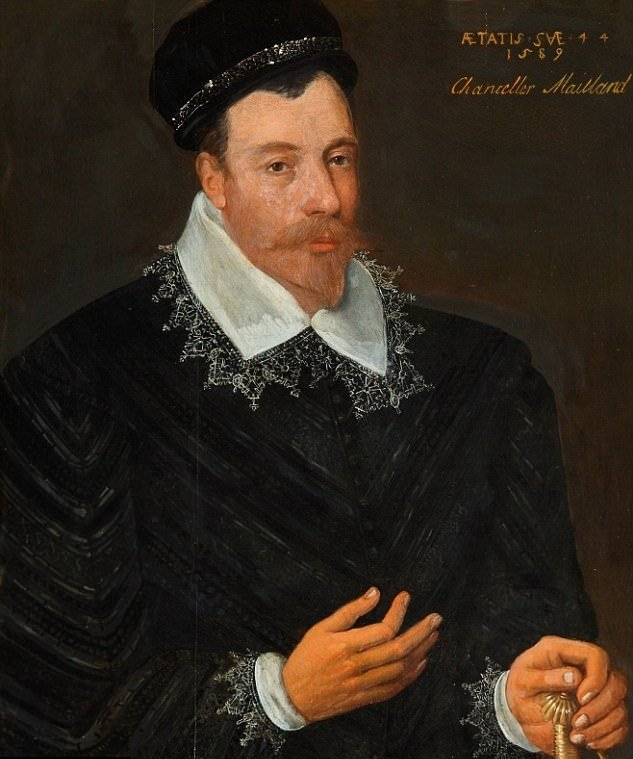
John Maitland of Thirlestane and his wife Jean Fleming administered the English subsidy money in 1588-90

The 17th-century writer James Howell described the subsidy as a "royal pension" to maintain James VI's court. The money was an annual gift Elizabeth I to James VI of Scotland which remained contingent on him pursuing pro-English policies in Scotland, such as the suppression of the pro-Catholic northern Earls of Huntly and Erroll. The situation gave Elizabeth extra leverage in border matters, including the Kinmont Willie affair in 1596, and in Scottish policy towards Ireland. In 1601, Elizabeth wished James to take action to prevent Scottish arms and men fighting in Tyrone.

=== Origins ===
The diplomat Robert Pitcairn and the Master of Wardrobe James Murray presented an idea for an annual payment of £3,000 for a royal guard and the fees of Border wardens in 1579. In May 1580, the English ambassador Robert Bowes had reported discussions amongst Scottish supporters of English policy, that Elizabeth's money in Scotland would be "best bestowed on the King only", so binding his nobility to the queen, and that "little matter of importance might be done without her highness' privity". This was thought better than giving pensions to individual Scottish nobles or a particular courtier. A yearly pension or "gratuity" of 10,000 crowns was mentioned in July 1583, and discussions revolved around the idea that a small amount might not be received with honour. The later subsidy scheme was the realisation of these suggestions.

=== Wotton's negotiation in 1585 ===
Edward Wotton brought James an offer of a regular payment of 20,000 crowns in June 1585. Francis Walsingham thought that amount would "carry with it a reasonable good sound" and "so season his mind, as he shall take a good taste of the pension", but the full amount was not yet available, and Walsingham instructed Wotton to revise the figure down to £3,000 sterling. Walsingham hoped the Master of Gray would help persuade James to accept a lesser sum. Wotton privately discussed a treaty with England and the offer of a pension with James in the gallery at Falkland Palace.

However, a formal amount or lasting agreement was never concluded, though £4,000 sterling, suggested by Elizabeth in March 1586, has sometimes been regarded as the usual figure. The payment was part of the arrangements which led to the Union of the Crowns along with the secret correspondence of James VI. The historian Julian Goodare proposes the word "Subsidy" can better represent the relationship implied by the payments than the loaded historical terms used, "pension", "gratuity", or "annuity". As a gift, the money implied a relationship for which James VI should be grateful. James' English courtier Thomas Fowler wrote that England sent him "a poor pension to make your majesty [James VI] their pensioner to your more disgrace and shame to all princes that knows it".

=== Leverage ===
The regular payment of the subsidy can be seen as James VI's rejection of his mother's proposals for joint rule in "association" in Scotland. Elizabeth positioned herself as the relation and substitute mother of the Scottish king, writing of her "speciall and motherlye cair over our said darrest brother and cousing ever since his byrthe, respecting him as our owne sone".

After annuity payments began in 1586, Elizabeth was able to signal her disapproval of Scottish policies by keeping James' diplomats and agents waiting in London in the hope of payment and by sending sums amounting to less than James's expectations. One year, James wrote to Elizabeth of the "endless detaining" of his agent Robert Jousie on an errand "turned from one honorable annuity to a voluntary uncertainty with long begging".

James more than once reminded Elizabeth and William Cecil of a Latin proverb in favour of prompt payment, bis dat qui cito dat – he that gives quickly gives twice. Francis Walsingham was sometimes in favour of the payments, and tried to influence and encourage Elizabeth to pay the pension by asking a diplomat in Scotland to amplify requests for the money.

Thomas Fowler wrote that James VI gave "to every one that asks what they desire, even to vain youths and proud fools the very lands of his crown ... Yea, what he gets from England, if it were a million, they would get it from him, so careless is he of any wealth if he may enjoy his pleasure in hunting". James VI gave money away with apparent freedom, but Julian Goodare notes such patronage and largesse was a necessary feature of early modern courts.

Fowler was an executor of the English estates of James VI's grandmother, Margaret Douglas, Countess of Lennox. Later Archbishop John Spottiswoode would write the subsidy money was compensation for these estates in England. However Julian Goodare finds no evidence for this, and Elizabeth never made a legal declaration or "instrument" regarding continual payment of the subsidy.

=== Getting it in writing ===
James VI sent Elizabeth a draft agreement for regular payments in April 1586 which she never completed. He wrote that she seemed "to marvel and mislike so far of the sending of yon instrument". A draft warrant for a yearly subsidy was made, but Elizabeth never signed it. Instead, in one of her letters, she described an "instrument" brought to her, and drafted, she guessed, by his poorly advised councillors. Elizabeth renewed her offer of conditional support and the "portion of relief";

Touching an "instrument" as your secretary term it, ... First, I will, as long as you alter not your course, take care for your safety, help your need, and shun all acts that may damnify you in any sort, either in present or future time, and for the portion of relief, I mind never to lessen, though as I see cause, I will rather augment. And this I hope may stand you in as much assurance as my name in parchment, and no less for both our honours.

James kept her letter from Greenwich on 2 June 1586 which mentions the "portion meet for your own private use" which Elizabeth hoped to have "opportunity always to continue", and in November 1596 this letter "concerning the annuity" was copied into the register of the Privy Council of Scotland.

Elizabeth's ambassador William Asheby, made a promise of a yearly payment of £5000 during the crisis of the Spanish Armada in 1588. Asheby also embarrassed Robert Sidney, claiming that he would bring £3000 to Edinburgh in August 1588, (the money was sent to Robert Bowes at Berwick in September). Asheby was enthusiastic about the reach of the subsidy and called it a "legion of angels". Cecil recorded Asheby's offers to have been made "without warrant". James would later claim that Asheby was "clad with commission" and had written a statement about the subsidy with Elizabeth's permission.

=== Wedding gift ===
James VI gave lands to Anne of Denmark as a wedding gift, including the former properties of Dunfermline Abbey. The Master of Gray, had rights to the title of Abbot or Commendator of Dunfermline. On 6 July 1590 James allocated him 12,000 merks in compensation from the next installment of the subsidy. Gray was to resign his title to the king's "dearest spouse".

=== Making ends meet ===
There were continual difficulties financing the two royal households in the 1590s. James VI asked Chancellor Maitland to resolve issues over servants's pay in April 1591 after kitchen staff deserted their posts, and discussed the subject of paying two departing members of the queen's household (Christopher Cariot and George Epping) with either money or livery clothes. He reminded Maitland of promises he had made to Anne's mother, Sophie of Mecklenburg-Güstrow, writing, "Suppose we be not wealthy, let us be proud poor bodies".

A Scottish diplomatic agent (and former court musician), James Hudson gave a view of the situation in December 1591, when usual Scottish income and crown rentals seems not to meet the expenses of the royal households, and a secure regular income would support a royal guard:

While I was there his table and the Queen's had like to have been unserved for want. The Queen, her house and train are more costly to him than his own, and all his servants of great place abuse him, and every (one) of them serveth one another's turn, and the King ... hath nothing that he accounts certain to come into his purse but what he hath from her Majesty, which of extreme need he is driven sore against his heart to urge her Majesty for some certainty in, and that account be made and times of payment assigned.

Several reports and suggestions for saving money at this time survive. A document produced by an exchequer committee appointed to investigate crown finance for the king includes the signatures of Robert Melville, James Melville of Halhill, David Seton of Parbroath, David Carnegie of Colluthie, and James Durham of Duntarvie. In July 1592, James had to ask Elizabeth for an extra payment after the Raid of Falkland, to hunt down the rebels.

In July 1593 the Scottish ambassador in London Sir Robert Melville, with Roger Aston, insisted that the deceased diplomat Thomas Randolph had promised in 1586 the sum would be £5000 yearly. William Cecil thought this unlikely, and ordered Randolph's papers to be searched for any record of this. Melville had been asked to request money for 600 soldiers and also for accounts be made of the subsidy payments since 1586. Such attempts to formalize regular payments were not successful.

=== Octavians and after ===
There were rumours and discussions in 1596 that James VI would no longer ask for payments, due to the administration of the Octavians, but the arrangements continued. A payment was later and smaller than expected in 1597, and James wrote that things had changed from a "honourable annuity to a voluntary uncertainty almost, after long begging". Elizabeth had decided to withhold any payment until James sent Robert Ker, Laird of Cessford as a prisoner to England, for border raiding.

In March 1598, Edward Bruce, Commendator of Kinloss, was sent as ambassador to London with instructions to secure an undertaking of regular payments and a settled amount. Although James VI expected £6000, Kinloss collected £3000 and Elizabeth wrote of her displeasure at James' management of the border and involvement in Ireland. David Foulis was sent to London in August 1598, and reported that James had made a proclamation against sending arms to Ireland. Foulis secured another £3000 in December 1598, but James was not satisfied. He seems to have suggested that both Kinloss and Foulis had been corrupted. Meanwhile, following the death of Burghley in 1598, his secretary Henry Maynard forwarded to Sir Robert Cecil a copy of the letter from Elizabeth which James VI claimed established annual payments of £4000, with a note from Burghley that in 1586 the ambassador Edward Wootton had not been authorised to offer any greater sum.

After the embassy of the Earl of Mar and Edward Bruce to London in April 1601 the sum paid was increased, by the persuasion of Sir Robert Cecil. The terms or dates of payment were now settled, as noted by the Secretary James Elphinstone and a Scottish diplomat in London, James Hudson. The payments would be made regularly on 10 June and at Christmastime.

=== Keeping an accurate account ===
The English diplomat Thomas Randolph noted in a memorandum that James VI did not issue receipts for money given to him in 1586, and neither had Regent Morton and Regent Moray in previous years. He explained that princes and others do not give "bills of their hands" for "danger or reproach unto themselves for receiving of the same".

Several lists were made in England of the actual yearly amounts paid, and some records of the expenditure are held by the British Library, the National Library of Scotland and the National Records of Scotland. The records in the British Library were obtained from the collections of Dawson Turner and Hopetoun House, possibly from the working papers of Alexander Hay. Turner also owned two letters Anne of Denmark sent to James VI from Flekkerøy. The subsidy records complement the Scottish royal treasurers' accounts, exchequer rolls, vouchers, and precepts of the period held by the National Records of Scotland.

Some of the subsidy money in 1589 and 1590 and revenue collected by William Keith of Delny was accounted by Jean Fleming, wife of the Chancellor of Scotland, John Maitland of Thirlestane. Some this money passed to William Schaw, Master of Work, to repair royal palaces. Maitland was reimbursed for expenses made on the king's voyage to Norway and Denmark to meet his bride Anne of Denmark from the subsidy. The accounts detail the expense of fitting out and decorating a ship belonging to Robert Jameson of Ayr. Maitland also accounted expenditure of part of the dowry of Anne of Denmark and a gift from her mother Sophie of Mecklenburg-Güstrow in Denmark in Danish dalers.

By May 1591, the money came to be managed by Thomas Foulis a well connected Edinburgh goldsmith and his business partner the Edinburgh textile merchant Robert Jousie. Foulis and Jousie were regarded as the "chief furnishers" of the king and queen by July 1596. An account made by Foulis for the years 1594 to 1596 survives and has been published. The money was received for James VI from the English subsidy, from the duty on the gold mines of Crawford Mure and Robert Mure, money coined at the royal mint by Thomas Acheson, and further subsidy money received from the Secretary, Richard Cockburn of Clerkington. Elizabeth had let it be known that the money given to Cockburn should be taken to Scotland, and not spent in London, as had happened in previous years.

In London, Foulis and Jousie, or their agents, would pay the tellers and clerks of the Exchequer a handling fee of £20 when the money was paid out. Robert Jousie was delayed in England in 1597 waiting for the subsidy. James VI wrote to Elizabeth I about his "endless detaining", saying that Jousie's "errand, it is turned from an honourable annuity to a voluntary uncertainty almost after long begging". Foulis was bankrupted in January 1598, and the money from England was then recorded in the usual treasurer's account kept by Walter Stewart, 1st Lord Blantyre and his successor, Alexander Elphinstone, 4th Lord Elphinstone. The Scottish diplomat and intriguer Archibald Douglas suggested that Foulis was dishonest in his accounting. According to Douglas, Foulis had selected a ring from a goldsmith in London as the king's gift to Anthony Bacon, a secretary of the Earl of Essex. Bacon later tried to pawn the ring with the same London goldsmith, who said it was worth only half the amount that Foulis had allowed for it in the account of the royal subsidy.

=== Cursed as English knights ===
The subsidy was not always regarded as beneficial by the people of Scotland. In April 1591 James VI sent Sir John Carmichael and William Stewart of Blantyre to Glasgow to arrest Brian O'Rourke, a rebel to Queen Elizabeth in Ireland, and take him to England. This caused a riot in Glasgow, because the arrest was thought likely to damage the Irish trade, and Carmichael and Blantyre were cursed as "Queen Elizabeth's knights" and the king for taking "English angels", a clear reference to the subsidy James VI received from Queen Elizabeth. Carmichael and Blantyre were disappointed by the subsequent execution of O'Rourke. James VI would later argue that he deserved increased amounts of subsidy for his compliance in the rendition of O'Rourke.

=== Costume fit for a King and a Queen ===
Much of the subsidy was allocated to pay for clothes worn by the monarchs. In July 1594 the textile merchant Robert Jousie was paid £18,280 Scots from the subsidy money for the clothes he had supplied to the king and Anne of Denmark. Jousie declared on 1 February 1596 he had spent £71,513-14d Scots on the queen's clothes in six years. He kept meticulous accounts of fabrics supplied to the royal tailors which are held by the National Archives of Scotland. Such expenditure demonstrated the power and stability of the Stuart monarchy.

Thomas Foulis' account of subsidy money mentions eight ruffs bought in London for Anne of Denmark that cost £24 sterling, to wear in August 1594 at the baptism of Prince Henry. Velvet for the livery costume of an African servant who attended Anne of Denmark when she went riding is mentioned in Robert Jousie's account.

=== Baptist Hicks ===
The English textile merchant and financier Baptist Hicks wrote to James VI on 1 March 1600 hoping for repayment of sums due to him by Robert Jousie. He had written twice before to the king, and was disappointed to hear from the Scottish ambassador that he would not be paid from the annuity awarded by Queen Elizabeth. Hicks supplied some of the fabrics worn by the Scottish court, especially those used at the 1594 baptism of Prince Henry, and was not paid as late as 1606. Hicks employed factors at Florence and Leghorn to buy the best quality fabrics, and one of his former employees Humphrey Dethick came to the baptism of Duke Robert at Dunfermline with tragic consequences.

=== English beer and pewter ===
Other items sent from England "for the use of the King of Scots" and exempted from customs may have been bought with subsidy money. Such parcels, "trunks and packs" sent by Foulis and Jousie, were allowed to pass without custom charge at Berwick-upon-Tweed. In November 1596 James VI was sent 20 tons of beer, 4 hampers of pewter, 2 hampers of glasses, 2 chests of sugar, 2 barrels with boxes of comfits and confections and banqueting stuff, a pack of rugs and upholsterers' wares, and two trunks of kersey wool fabrics, in a ship of Dysart belonging to Andrew Jack. There was a trunk of costume for pages and lackeys in December 1597. In April 1598 six trunks, four packs, and two hampers of clothes for James VI were sent north with the goods of the departing ambassador Edward Bruce. From March 1595, English beer, brewed in London by Robert Sky was sent annually for the king and queen's households.

== Scottish diplomats and agents and the subsidy, 1586-1602 ==
The following are payments and agents compiled from lists from The National Archives (United Kingdom); in May 1586 Roger Aston and William Home received £4000 Sterling; in July 1588 Sir John Carmichael received £2000, and in September 1588, £2000; in May 1589 James Colville of Easter Wemyss received £3000; in May 1589 Master John Colville received £3000, in June and July 1590 Carmichael received two payments of £500 and £3000; in May 1591 James Hudson, Thomas Foulis, and Robert Jousie received £3000, and in July 1592, £2000; in July 1593 Sir Robert Melville received £4000; Richard Cockburn of Clerkington received £3,000 in November 1594; David Foulis received £4,000 in July 1594 and £3,000 in August 1595 and 1596; Master Edward Bruce and Jousie collected £3000 in May 1598; Foulis collected £3000 in December 1598; James Sempill, Jousie, Archibald Johnstone (a Scots merchant in London), and George Heriot collected £3000 in February 1600; Foulis, Johnstone, and Master James Hamilton collected £2000 in October 1601; Foulis and Aston collected £3,000 in January 1602; Aston collected £2,500 in June and December 1602.

== Significant rewards and purchases ==
=== An English poet and the Highland genealogy ===
An English poet named "Mr Breton" who visited the Scottish court in 1588 or 1589 and received a gift of £160 Scots may have been Nicholas Breton. Around the same time James VI gave an English visitor named "Rachaell" £300, and paid a "Highlandman" for making a chart of the genealogy of all the Kings of Scotland. Such charts were displayed in the gallery of Linlithgow Palace and the English keeper Roger Aston added his own genealogy for comic effect.

=== George Beeston and his English mariners ===
In 1589 the English admiral George Beeston took a fleet to Scotland. Their purpose was likely a show of support for the Danish marriage. An unfortunate incident embarrassed James VI. On 1 June Beeston arrived in the Forth on the Vanguard followed by Edward Croft in the Tiger with the Achates. On 5 June some of the English crewmen came ashore into Edinburgh to shop and sightsee. Three got in fight in a tavern, one was stabbed, and as they returned to Leith and their ship they were attacked again by a group of Spanish sailors, survivors from the Armada shipwrecks. An English trumpet officer, was killed. Beeston and the English ambassador William Ashby had an audience with James VI on 7 June at the Palace of Holyroodhouse seeking an enquiry and justice. Ashby and Thomas Fowler wrote that the king treated the sailors honourably; James VI gave Beeston a locket set with diamonds and 100 gold crowns and gold chains and rings provided by the goldsmith Thomas Foulis to his captains. James also requested that Edinburgh town council give Beeston his three captains, and the English ambassadors an "honest banquet" in Nicol Edward's new house. The banquet was organised by William Fairlie.

James VI had given some of the subsidy money to the Earl Marischal for his voyage to Denmark to arrange his marriage to Anne of Denmark. The Master of Gray thought this would not please Queen Elizabeth. James VI spent 75% of the subsidy payment of 1589 on the wedding and matrimonial diplomacy. A payment was made to an Edinburgh tailor, Alexander Oustean, who had supported the marriage.

=== The Maitland service ===
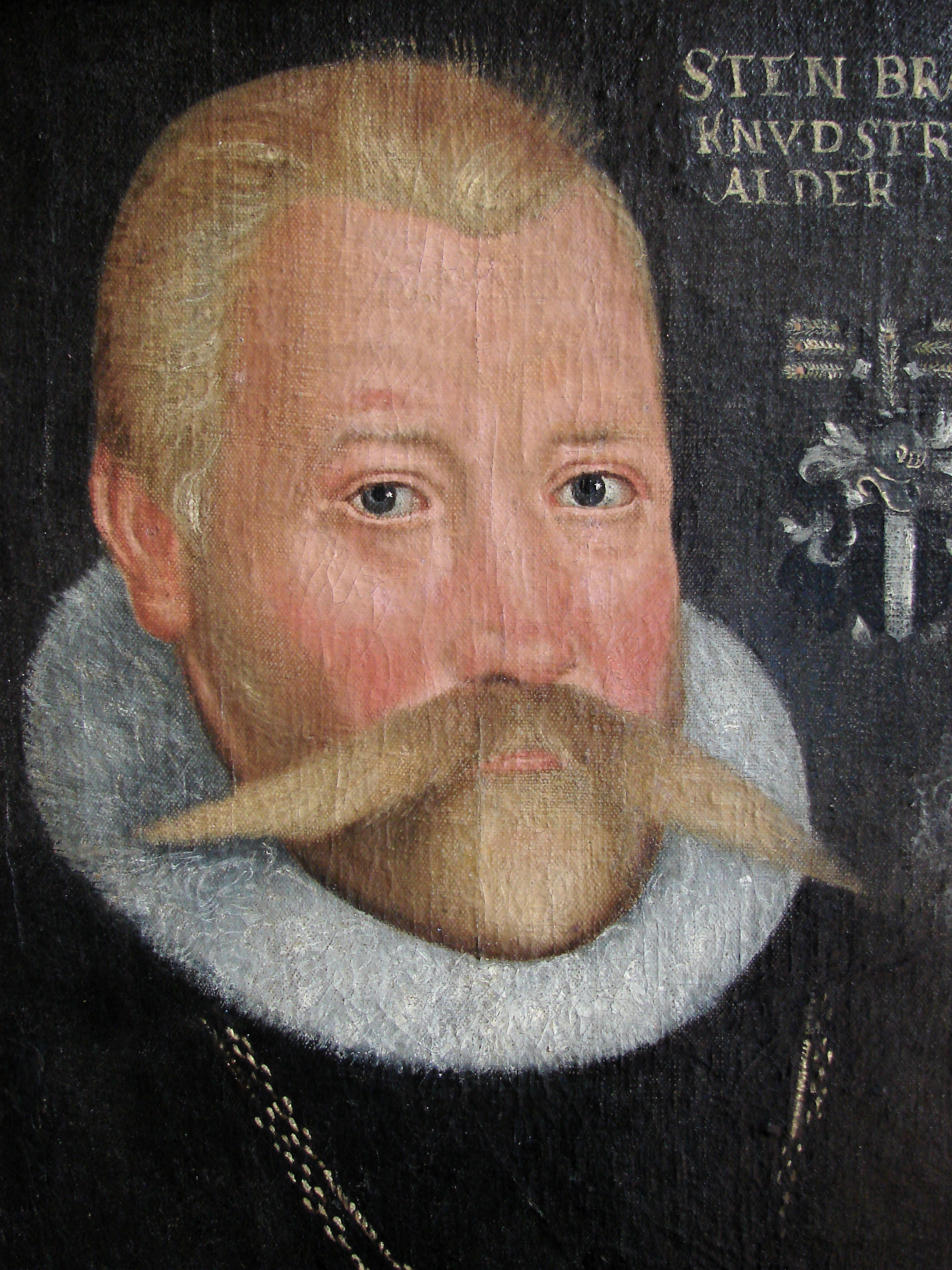
James VI took a silver service to Norway and gave some of it to Steen Brahe

On 26 September 1589 the Maitlands made an inventory of a gilt silver service, known collectively a "cupboard" after the furniture with shelves where such silver was displayed at mealtimes. Part of the service came from Thomas Foulis. Other silver pieces were probably from £2,000 sterling worth of silver and silk fabrics given to James VI by Elizabeth. In 1600, Lady Russell wrote that she had obtained some of the silk fabric intended to be sent to the royal wedding in Scotland and had it made into a gown and petticoat as a gift for Elizabeth I.

Master John Colville had arrived in Scotland on 22 September with the silver, which was supplied by Alderman Martin. The silver service was taken to Denmark-Norway and gifts from it were given to dignitaries. James gave silver plate from the service to Steen Brahe and Axel Gyldenstierne in Oslo, The remainder became the king's gift to Maitland. A gift of silver was mentioned again in March 1594. James VI wrote to Robert Bowes asking that John Colville should be reimbursed for his services from the subsidy to the tune of £1266 sterling, and noted that despite rumours against he had delivered the silver plate.

=== Masque costume and rewards ===
Robert Jousie's costume accounts include masque outfits for Anne of Denmark and James VI. These include costumes for a dance at the wedding of Marie Stewart, Countess of Mar and for James VI and his valet at wedding celebrations for the "laird of Tullibardine's daughter". The occasion was the wedding of Lilias Murray and John Grant of Freuchie. The record mentions "ane stand of maskerye claythis to hym that wes his majesties vallett att thatt tyme". The valet was almost certainly John Wemyss of Logie, and the incident sheds further light on his troubled career.

In 1591 Anne of Denmark received £1,000 Scots from the subsidy, as did Lord Sypynie, "Rachaell, an Englishwoman" was given £400, and John Wemyss of Logie had £300. One "English lady" who visited Scotland gave him a copy of the Geneva Bible, an edition which the King did not approve of.

=== Prince Henry and the Chapel Royal ===
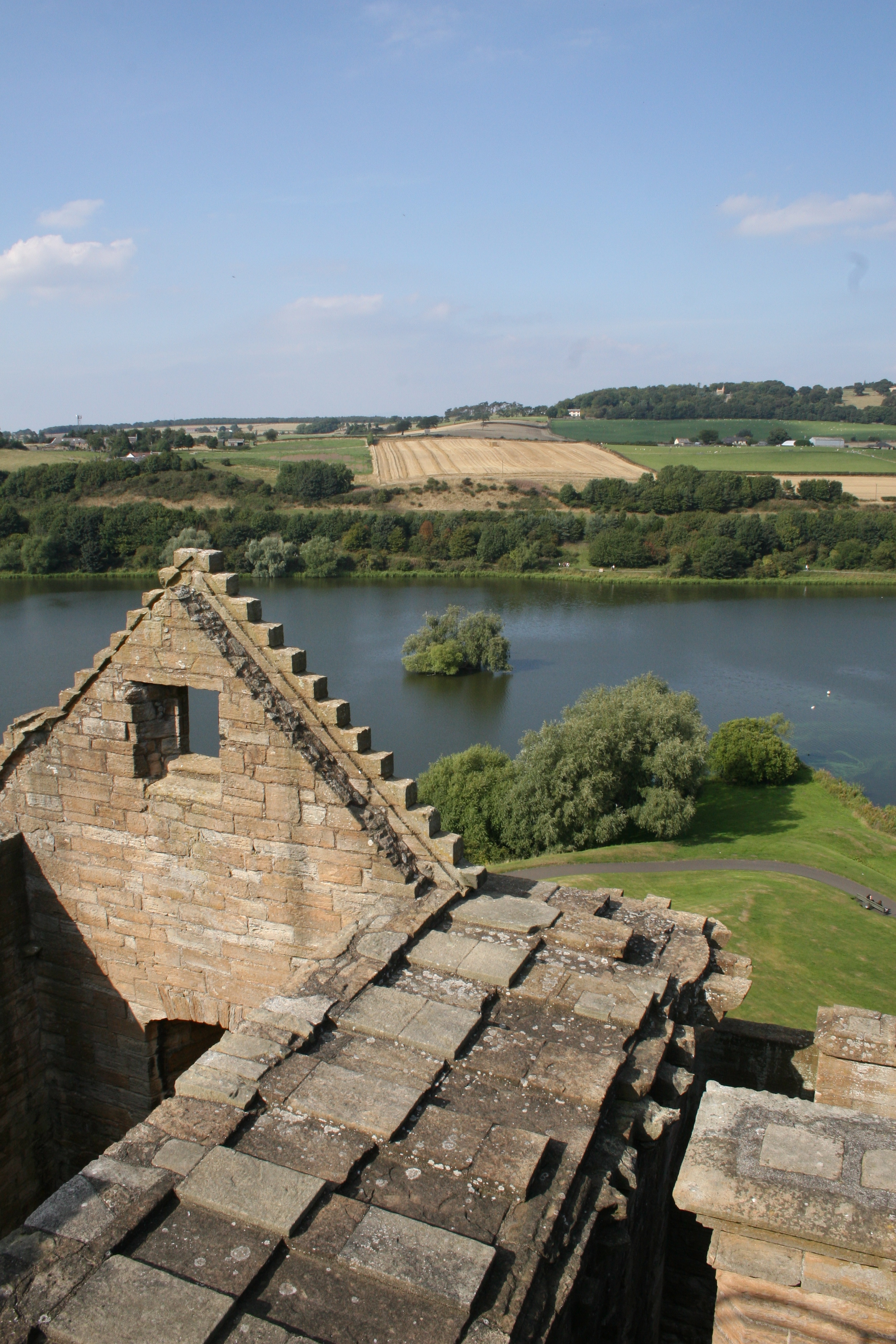
In 1594 James VI requested a shipment of English lead to repair the roof of Linlithgow Palace

In May 1594 James VI ordered English alabaster for the Chapel Royal at Stirling Castle and lead to repair the roof of Linlithgow Palace, the responsibility of Roger Aston. The alabaster may have been for carving or to make gypsum plaster to decorate the chapel for the baptism of Prince Henry. James VI frequently visited Prince Henry at Stirling and on 16 August 1595 ordered some silver work for his chamber from Thomas Foulis. He encouraged the infant to hold a pen and make a mark on the precept, and certified it, writing "I will testify this is the prince's own mark".

Subsidy money was used to fund the Prince's household at Stirling. In September 1595, the Earl of Mar's servant Gilbert Mastertoun received £5,000 Scots "for entertainment of the prince". In 1598, Mar received another £5,000 which was paid to William Rae, a servant of the Edinburgh textile merchant Jacob Barroun.

=== Operations against the Catholic earls in the north ===
Queen Elizabeth noted that £2,000 sterling of the subsidy money in the summer of 1594 was spent in London. After the baptism of Prince Henry, she insisted that all of the next installment was sent to Scotland, where she hoped James would use the money in his campaign against the Catholic earls.

Richard Cockburn of Clerkington, Secretary of State was sent as ambassador to London in October 1594 and received £2000. The cost of Cockburn's embassy was met with £1,000 Scots from the Danish dowry paid to James VI which had been invested with the town council of Haddington. He passed £680 Scots from the subsidy money to the goldsmith and royal financier Thomas Foulis for the king's use. The rest of the payment was sent to the Duke of Lennox, who was appointed Lieutenant of the North, for the wages of his soldiers in the north of Scotland for one month. Lennox wrote a memorandum of his activities in Aberdeenshire after the battle of Glenlivet, holding trials for prisoners and placing castles and strongholds in the hands of loyal gentlemen.

=== New Year gifts ===
As New Year's Day gifts in 1596, Thomas Foulis supplied jewels including a gold salamander studded with diamonds given to the Master of Work, William Schaw. Anna of Denmark had a diamond set gold locket or tablet with a diamond and ruby necklace. Sir Thomas Erskine had a locket set with rubies and diamonds, the Duke of Lennox had a hat badge in the shape of a diamond set gold crown, and a courtier known as the "Little Dutchman" (possibly William Belo) received a diamond ring.

=== Sapphire portrait ===
In 1598 Robert Jousie's account of costume includes a payment to a Dutch craftsman in London who engraved a sapphire with Queen Elizabeth's portrait for Anne of Denmark for £17 Sterling or £280 Scots. Master David Foulis carried the sapphire "home" to Scotland. This Cornelius "Draggie" turned up in Edinburgh in 1601, attempting to set up a weaver's workshop to exploit generous subsidies for expert craftsmen, but the other weavers protested he was a lapidary, not a weaver. In London, Cornelius seems to have been associated with the Harderet family workshop.

In Edinburgh, Cornelius may have worked for the goldsmith George Heriot. Heriot was a witness at the baptism of his son Daniel in Edinburgh on 25 January 1601. Another lapidary working in Edinburgh at this time was Palamedes Stevens, father of the painters Anthonie Palamedesz. and Palamedes Palamedesz. (I) who were baptised in Leith.

The sapphire is the last item mentioned in Thomas Foulis' accounts of royal apparel. On 20 February 1600 James Sempill of Beltrees delivered £400 Sterling from the annuity directly to the goldsmith George Heriot, probably for jewellery made for Anna of Denmark.

== Danish dowry account: the Tocher Gude ==
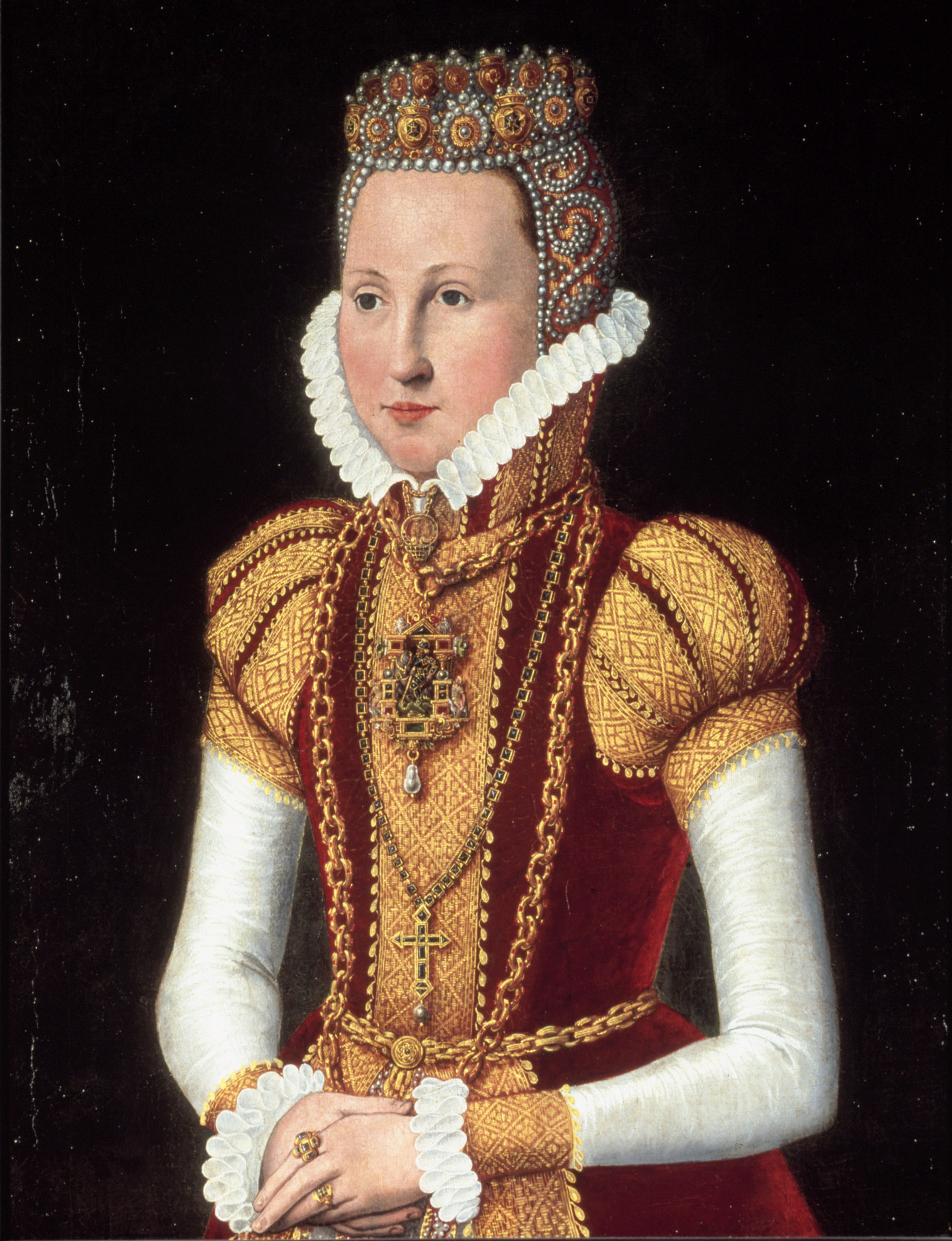
Sophie of Mecklenburg-Güstrow gave her son-in-law King James 10,000 dalers

Maitland made an account of the dowry paid to James VI in Denmark. The account is also part of the British Library manuscript bought from Dawson Turner. Some of dowry was spent in Denmark as gifts and rewards, but Maitland held some back for investment in Scotland.

The dowry was sometimes called the "tocher", "toquher", or "tocher gude". Money raised by taxation totalling £100,000 Scots to fund costs associated with the marriage was also called the "tocher", possibly leading to confusion.

The dowry money was delivered in Denmark in February 1590. The king's previous expenses abroad had been partly met with a loan of £5000 from Maitland. Maitland received 75,000 dalers of dowry money from Christoffer Valkendorff and a further 10,000 dalers from the Queen Mother, Sophie of Mecklenburg-Güstrow. He paid out 6,030 dalers for a debt of George Keith, 5th Earl Marischal secured with Frederick Lyell (1536-1601), a merchant of Scottish origin in Helsingør and factor of George Bruce of Carnock. This was for a jewel given to Anne of Denmark at her betrothal in September 1589. This payment and the next fourteen entries were copied into the "Hopetoun manuscript". The account records an entertainment for the newly-weds at Oslo provided by acrobats called "vautis"; "And of sex scoir daleris to the tua vautis that was in Upslo".

Maitland recorded gifts given to the printer working for Tycho Brahe on Hven, his servants, and the workmen building his paper mill and corn mill, and the boatmen who took the royal party to Tycho's island. On 13 March 1590 James VI came to Frederiksborg Castle. He gave money to the poor, to the keeper of the park who lent the couple horses, to a woman who kept pheasants and "spruce" or German fowls, and 100 dalers to the Captain of Frederiksborg for his officers and servants. They stayed longer at Kronborg and the captain and servants there were given 2,000 dalers.

Some selected items in the Danish dowry account were printed by George Duncan Gibb in 1874. The whole account was edited by Miles Kerr-Peterson and published by the Scottish History Society (SHS) in 2020.

=== Investing the dowry ===
The unspent remainder of the dowry was carried to James' ship and taken back to Scotland, in total around £108,000 Scots. This money and the remainder of the marriage tax was invested in various burgh towns by the Comptroller, David Seton of Parbroath. The terms were 10%, providing income for the royal households. Probably in December 1591, James VI wrote to Alexander Hay, Clerk of Register, urging him to forward royal business with the bailies of Edinburgh on the "matter of the tocher", the Scots word for the dowry. According to the author of the Historie and Life of King James the Sext the money had been lodged with the towns to give the queen an annual income, and James was urged to spend it by corrupt advisors to offset his expenditure on "unnecessary" armed troops.

The towns lent the money out at higher interest. The burgh council of Dundee made efforts to recheck the status and securities offered by the borrowers. In 1593, £4000 from the "annualrent" or investment of the dowry was delivered to Anne of Denmark, and £4170 was paid to John Arnot of Birswick, a creditor of James VI. James Dalziel, an Edinburgh merchant, was given £130.

=== Paying for the baptism of Prince Henry ===
A part of the dowry was spent on the celebrations at the baptism of Prince Henry at Stirling Castle in 1594. Costumes for the women of Queen Anne's household were bought using £4000 held at St Andrews and Anstruther collected by John Elphinstone of Selmes and Baberton, while £3000 from Perth paid for upholstery and repairs to tapestry. The money from Perth was delivered at Stirling Castle. Robert Jousie received £1000 (of £8000) from Aberdeen. Anne of Denmark was not pleased by this decision.

In addition to these sums, Anne of Denmark received £18,796 Scots from Thomas Foulis from the subsidy money up to 13 September 1594, which were available to meet the costs of the household and expenses of the baptism.

At the banquet in the Great Hall, during the masque, James VI was styled a "New Jason", on account of his voyage to Norway. The story of Jason and the Argonauts is told in Ovid's Metamorphoses and the Argonautica of Apollonius of Rhodes. By analogy, Anne of Denmark was Medea and, as Clare McManus notes, she was also the Golden Fleece and the embodiment of her dowry.

== Further reading and external links ==
- Primary sources
  - Images from the 'Hopetoun manuscript', British Library Add. MS 33531 ff.289r-290v summarising payments made from the annuity
  - REED project extracts from Scottish exchequer records and the Foulis & Jousie accounts relating to costume and drama, Sarah Carpenter
  - George Duncan Gibb, Life and Times of Robert Gib, Lord of Carriber (London, 1874), pp. 295-302
  - Miles Kerr-Peterson & Michael Pearce, 'James VI's English Subsidy and Danish Dowry Accounts', Scottish History Society Miscellany XVI (Boydell, Woodbridge, 2020), pp. 1–94. ISBN 978-0-906245-45-3
- Secondary sources
  - Julian Goodare, 'The Debts of James VI of Scotland', Economic History Review, 62:4 (2009).
  - Julian Goodare, (2004, September 23). 'Foulis, Thomas (c. 1560–1628), goldsmith, financier, and mining entrepreneur', Oxford Dictionary of National Biography. Retrieved 29 Sep. 2018, doi:10.1093/ref:odnb/73674, subscription or library login required.
  - Julian Goodare, 'James VI's English Subsidy', in Julian Goodare & Michael Lynch, The Reign of James VI (Tuckwell, East Linton, 2000), pp. 110–125.
  - Julian Goodare, 'Thomas Foulis and the Scottish Fiscal Crisis of the 1590s', W. Ormrod, M. Bonney, R. Bonney, Crises, Revolutions and Self-Sustained Growth: Essays in European Fiscal History (Stamford, 1999), pp. 170–197
  - Julian Goodare, State and Society in Early Modern Scotland (Oxford, 1999), pp. 120–32.
  - An example of a sapphire cameo portrait of Queen Elizabeth (Locket, Christie’s 14-15 October 1992)
