= William Ashby (died 1593) =

English politician

William Ashby or Asheby (died 1593) was an English politician and a diplomat sent to Scotland.

== Career ==
He was the second son of Everard Ashby of Lowesby, Leicestershire, and Mary, daughter of Robert Baud of Somerby, and widow of William Berkley of Wymondham. He was educated at Peterhouse, Cambridge, Christchurch, Oxford, and in Paris. He studied law at the Middle Temple in London in 1575.

He was a Member (MP) of the Parliament of England for Grantham in 1586 and for Chichester in 1593. His nephew Robert Naunton, who accompanied him to Scotland, was the MP for the University of Cambridge.

== In Scotland ==
Ashby was ambassador in Scotland from 1588 to 1590. Many of Ashby's letters from Scotland are concerned with Thomas Fowler, a servant of the Countess of Lennox pursuing the affairs of Arbella Stuart. Ashby was interested in the fate of ships and men from the Spanish Armada. He followed the progress of the negotiations for the marriage of James VI, with Catherine de Bourbon or Anne of Denmark. In the last months of 1589 Ashby reported to Francis Walsingham and William Cecil on the events leading up to James VI of Scotland sailing to Norway to meet Anne of Denmark. He also encountered rivalry and jealousy from Thomas Fowler, an English former servant of Margaret Douglas residing at the Scottish court.

Ashby arrived in Edinburgh on 17 July 1588 with eight or nine attendants. He wrote to Walsingham to discuss his financial arrangements. He could get a loan of £100 Stirling in Edinburgh from George Bruce of Carnock. Repayment could be made in London to "Mr Castell and Mr Fountein", (Robert le Maçon, Sieur de la Fontaine), ministers of the French church. Fontaine was a family connection of the jeweller Abraham Harderet, who worked for Elizabeth I of England, and later for Elizabeth Stuart, Queen of Bohemia.

=== Survivors from the Spanish Armada ===
Ashby made a promise of a yearly payment or pension of £5000 and an English dukedom during the crisis of the Spanish Armada, hoping to engage James' support. The "English subsidy" actually paid was usually £3000. Cecil recorded Ashby's offers to have been made "without warrant". James VI would later claim that Asheby was "clad with commission" and had written a statement about the subsidy with Elizabeth's permission.

In Scotland, Ashby made friends with a French envoy from Henry of Navarre, Claude de l'Isle who was supposed to persuade James VI to marry Catherine de Bourbon, Henry's sister. Claude left Scotland in September 1588 carrying Ashby's letter to Walsingham. Ashby mentioned that de l'Isle had news about the wreck of a ship from the Spanish Armada on Islay, or rather, Mull. Claude had heard this news at Stirling Castle from a letter sent to James VI by "Mack Cleiden", Lachlan Mor Maclean. MacLean borrowed some guns and troops from the ship, then had it blown up. 18 Spanish survivors of the explosion and fire reached Edinburgh on 24 November 1588, to be joined by 200 more from the flagship El Gran Grifón wrecked on Fair Isle. Ashby wondered if an English man-of-war could intercept and destroy the survivors from Fair Isle coming from Anstruther as they crossed the Forth in fishing boats.

The survivors who reached Edinburgh included a nephew of the Duke of Medina Sidonia who was particularly welcomed by the earls of Huntly and Bothwell and Lord Seton. Others had to beg. A merchant in Leith whose ships and son were detained by the Spanish Inquisition was allowed by James VI to use three or four Spanish captains as hostages to get his son and goods returned. The merchant was threatened by others not to harm the captains, an incident which demonstrated to Ashby that the Scottish people were not as obedient to their sovereign as the English. By March 1589 Ashby thought it best the Spanish sailors were given free passage from Scotland, since their presence could be an aid to the pro-Spanish and pro-Catholic party in Scotland. He hoped a ship from Newcastle or Berwick upon Tweed could pick up some of Spanish captains.

On 1 June 1589 the veteran sailor George Beeston arrived in the Forth on the Vanguard followed by Edward Croft in the Tiger with the Achates. On 5 June some of the English crewmen came ashore into Edinburgh to shop and sightsee. Three got in a fight in a tavern, one was stabbed, and then as they returned their ship they were attacked by a group of Spanish sailors, and one was killed. Ashby and Beeston had an audience with James VI seeking an enquiry and justice. James VI gave jewels and rewards to Beeston and his officers.

Asbhy seems to have got on well with another diplomat from Navarre, François de Civille. Civille hoped they would keep up a correspondence. He also wanted Ashby to look after and send to England some horses he had acquired.

=== Royal marriage and contrary winds ===
On 28 August 1589 Maitland of Thirlestane informed Ashby that the marriage negotiations with Denmark were successfully concluded. Ashby was instructed to show English support for the royal wedding. He understood that James VI had no money to refurbish his palaces, and so advised Walsingham that now would be a good time for Elizabeth to send James money and gain his gratitude for only a little outlay. On 1 September, expecting Anne's arrival he wrote to Henry, Lord Scrope at Carlisle, asking him to gather food gifts for the wedding. On 8 September 1589 Ashby noted that James VI was waiting for his queen at Seton Palace.

Ashby recorded the drowning of Jane Kennedy by a storm on the Forth. He described James VI at Craigmillar Castle on 8 October 1589, still waiting in vain for Anne of Denmark as "retired, and as a kind lover spends the time in sighing till he hears of the return of Colonel Stewart". On 10 October Steen Bille and Andrew Sinclair arrived with a letter from Anne of Denmark, and Ashby learned the contents, that she had been delayed five times by storms and would stay over winter in Norway.

Ashby's letters and Scottish newsletters describing these maritime incidents and "contrary winds" (echoing the phrase vents contraires in Anna of Denmark's own letter to James VI), and an allusion in a letter of November to a "shipwreck" and "enchantments" that raised a tempest, may have contributed to feelings of apprehension about the adverse weather later expressed in witchcraft trials in Denmark and Scotland in 1591. The "shipwreck" letter appears to refer to the affairs and intrigues of Thomas Fowler rather than directly to the royal sea crossing.

On 15 October Ashby reported that the Earl of Bothwell, who was Admiral of Scotland, would have set sail to fetch the queen from Norway but was ill, and it was rumoured James VI would make the trip. On 21 October he wrote to James VI expressing his fears that the king would take the risk of sailing more like "a passionate lover than a circumspect prince", and counselling patience, since nothing James VI did would "bring hither that young princess the sooner."

At the end of October 1589 Thomas Fowler wrote a long letter to Cecil complaining about Ashby. Fowler claimed to have helped build Ashby's connections, confidence, and influence at the Scottish court, but another English resident, Richard Wigmore, had influenced Ashby against him. He understood that Ashby had spoken against him to the king and to the Earl of Bothwell, and that his enemies were intercepting his letters. Wigmore, according to Fowler, guided Ashby like a child. Asheby's own letters show that he was building an alliance with Bothwell at this time.
