= Jérôme Groslot =

Jérôme Groslot, Sieur de l'Isle (died 1622) was a French diplomat.

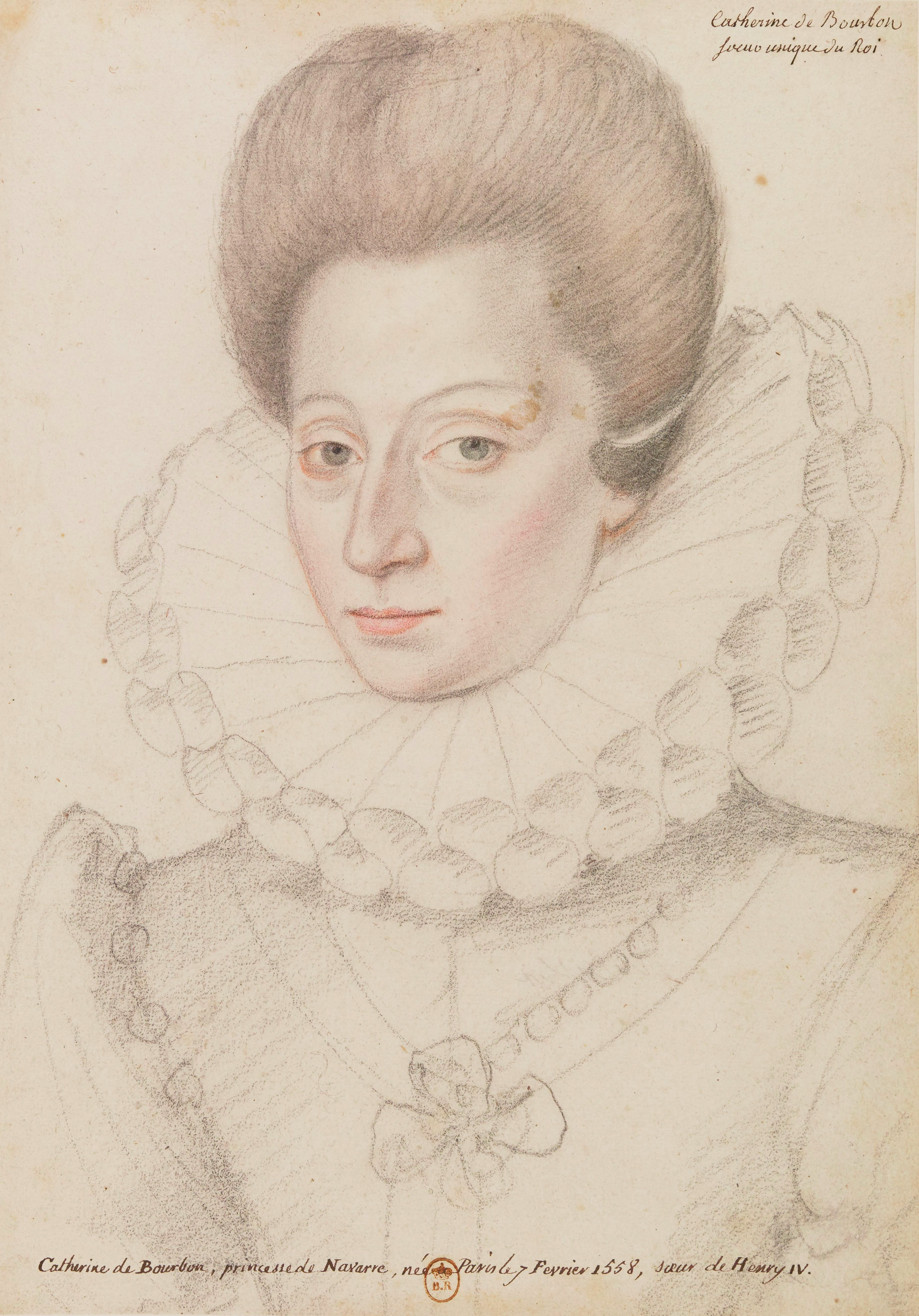
Jérôme Groslot, Sieur de l’Isle returned to Scotland to try to persuade James VI to marry Catherine of Bourbon

== Background ==
His father, also Jérôme Groslot (1520–1572), was killed during the St. Bartholomew's Day massacre in Paris. Jérôme Groslot came to Scotland and was brought up for a time with the young James VI at Stirling Castle. In Scotland, Jérôme Groslot was sometimes known as "the son of the Baillie of Orleans". His sister Louise married Samuel Puchot de Bertreuille in 1601.

== Diplomacy ==
Groslot returned to France in 1581 and George Buchanan, his former tutor, wrote to Theodore Beza on his behalf. He visited Oxford and Cambridge universities with Paulus Melissus.

Jérôme Groslot was sent to Scotland in April 1589 to advocate the marriage of James VI to Catherine de Bourbon, sister of Henry of Navarre. An English observer at the Scottish court Thomas Fowler wrote that François de Civille and Jérôme Groslot encouraged Edinburgh merchants who dealt with France to support the Navarre marriage.

John Colville wrote to the Laird of Wemyss that James VI was set on the Danish marriage and l'Isle's efforts were likely to be in vain. When he left Scotland in July, James VI gave him 200 French crowns to fund his journey to Navarre with James's answers.

== Death ==
He died in 1622.
