= James Campbell of Lawers =

James Campbell of Lawers (died 1645) was a Scottish landowner. His home, Lawers, was on the banks of Loch Tay in Perthshire.

He was a son of John Campbell of Lawers and Aberuchill and Beatrix Campbell, a daughter of Colin Campbell of Glenorchy. John Campbell was knighted at the coronation of Anne of Denmark in Edinburgh in 1590. John Campbell had a lodging in Perth. He, or perhaps his son, was found to have committed adultery with more than woman by the Kirk Session of Perth in 1596.

James Campbell married Jean Colville, a daughter of James Colville, Laird of Wemyss in 1595. The expense of the marriages of his daughters was supposed to have caused Colville some distress and he hoped for a financial reward from Elizabeth I. The marriage was promoted to the English ambassador Robert Bowes by John Colville who hoped Campbell and the Laird of Wemyss would be encouraged in their support for English policy. John Colville called Campbell "Junior", his father was still alive and he was known as the "young laird of Lawers". Campbell affectionately addressed John Colville as "father".

Campbell persuaded some Highland and Argyll men not to fight in Ireland against the English, speaking to two or three companies of soldiers on the point of embarking at Tarbert. He made offers to Sir Robert Cecil to support English soldiers in Ireland. The Dean of Limerick thought his youth and inexperience made him ill-equipped be a chief commander as yet, and he observed that Lawers was not a close adherent of the Earl of Argyll because his father's lands were far from the Earl's.

Their eldest son was John Campbell, 1st Earl of Loudoun (1598-1662). A younger son Mungo Campbell of Lawers was killed at the battle of Auldearn in 1645. A daughter married David Dunbar of Enterkine in Ayrshire.
