= Robert Macon =

Robert Macon may refer to:

- Robert B. Macon (1859–1925), U.S. Representative from Arkansas
- Robert C. Macon (1890–1980), U.S. Army general

== See also ==
- Robert le Maçon (1365–1443), chancellor of France
- Robert le Maçon, Sieur de la Fontaine (1534/5–1611), French Reformed minister and diplomat
