= Jewels of Arbella Stuart =

Jewels belonging to Arbella Stuart

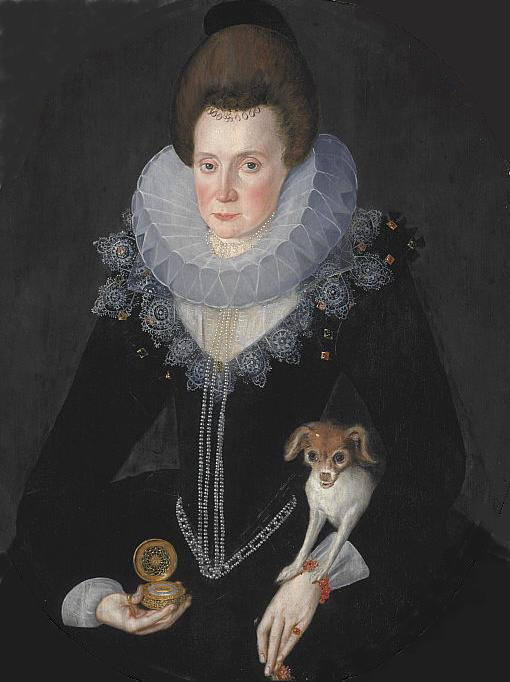
Arbella Stuart wears chains of pearls and large ruby and diamond studs at the shoulders of her gown

Jewels belonging to Arbella Stuart were noted in several lists. They include jewels which she inherited from her grandmother, Margaret Douglas, Countess of Lennox, which were taken to Scotland by her mother's executor.

== Jewels of Margaret Douglas in 1590 ==
Margaret Douglas, Countess of Lennox left her jewels to Arbella Stuart in her will of December 1577. Some of her jewels had been gifts from Mary I of England. On 19 September 1579, Mary, Queen of Scots, the niece of the Countess of Lennox, made out a warrant at Sheffield Manor authorising and instructing the countess' executor Thomas Fowler to deliver the jewels to Bess of Hardwick, Arbella's other grandmother. If Arbella were to die the jewels were to be given to James VI of Scotland. Despite the Scottish queen's instruction, Fowler retained some of the jewels himself.

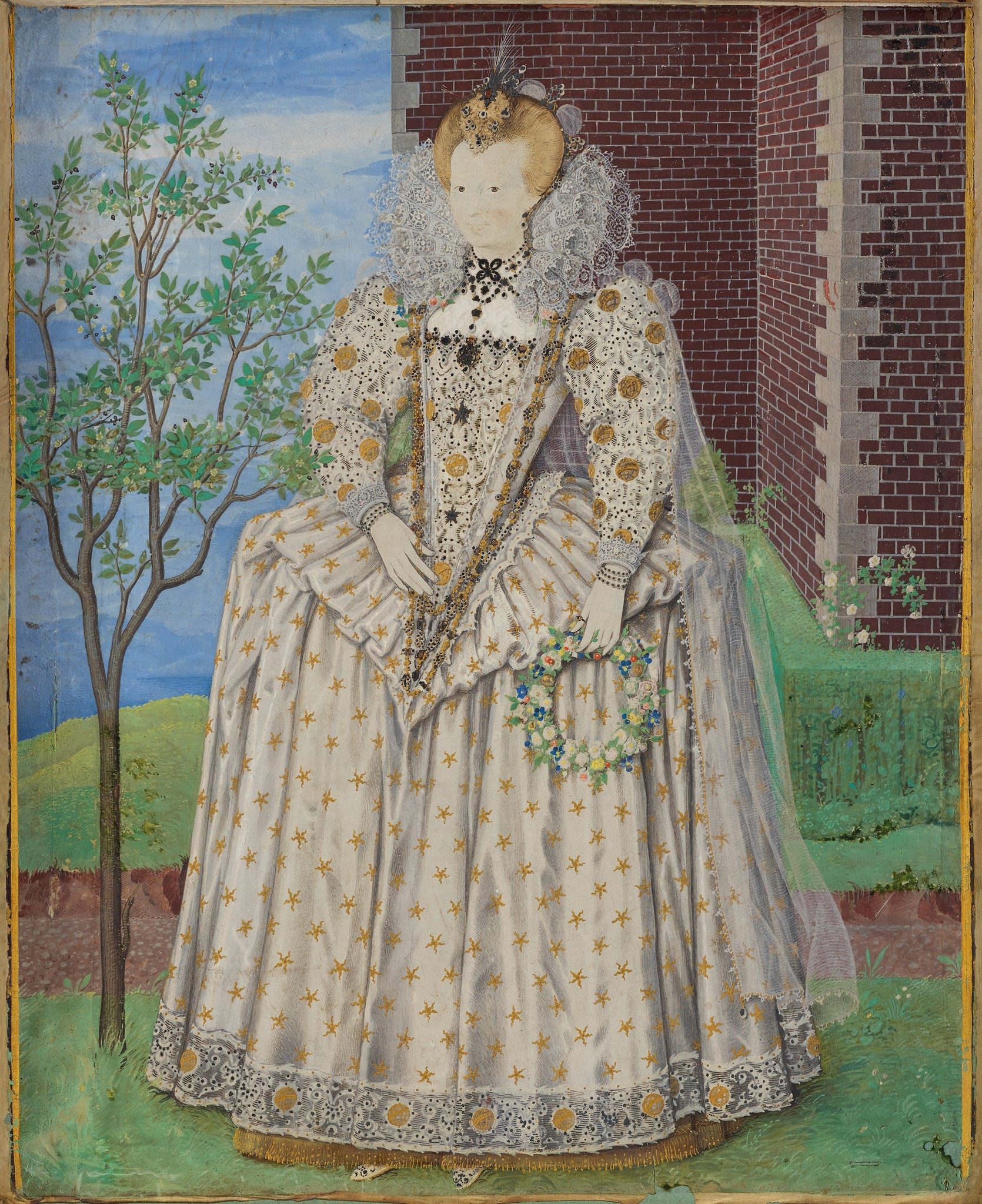
Arbella Stuart in 1592, wearing a feather jewel in her hair, Nicholas Hilliard.

A list of 21 jewels in a casket bequeathed to Arbella by the Countess of Lennox, and kept by her executor Thomas Fowler was made in April 1590. It includes an "H" of gold set with a rock ruby, and a gold sable head set with diamonds for a zibellino.

- A jewel set with a fair table diamond, a table ruby, and an emerald with a fair great pearl.
- A cross all set with fair table diamonds, with a square linked chain.
- A jewel set with a ballast, and a fair table diamond set beneath it.
- A "H" of gold set with rock ruby.
- A burrish set with a fair diamond.
- A rose set with fair diamonds.
- A carcanet (necklace) set with table diamonds.
- A girdle set with table diamonds.
- A border set with table diamonds; A border set with table rubies; A border set with rock emeralds,
- A sable, the head of gold set with diamonds (a gold head for a zibellino).
- A fair pearl chain; A chain set with rock rubies, pillar-wise; A chain of small turquoise set upon a three square pillar.
- A clock set in crystal, with a wolf of gold upon it.
- Buttons of rock rubies to set upon a gown.
- Table diamonds to set upon sleeves.
- Two tablets of gold, the one with two agates, with divers small turquoises, the other enamelled, in the form of a globe.
- Bracelets two pairs, one of agate, and the other of plain gold, with other things that be not yet in memory.

Thomas Fowler took jewels which were Arbella's inheritance to Scotland, where he attached himself to the court. After his death in Edinburgh, the jewels were obtained by the Earl of Bothwell in 1590. The Countess of Shrewsbury wrote to William Cecil for help recovering Arbella's jewels. The jewels included a diamond cross; a tablet with a diamond, a ruby and an emerald; a tablet with an agate on either side, and a diamond ring.

== Spanish gifts ==
Arbella sent a New Year's Day gift to Robert Cecil in 1604, which she described as a "trifle". Cecil reciprocated by sending a "fair pair of bracelets" to her at Hampton Court.

Philip III of Spain decided to give Arbella a jewel of considerable value at the time of the signing of the Treaty of London in 1604. The gift would be given in the name of the Duchess of Frias. The gift of jewels to Arbella was recommended to Juan Fernández de Velasco y Tovar, 5th Duke of Frías, known as the Constable of Castile, by the ambassador, Juan de Tassis, 1st Count of Villamediana, and they bought 72 or 76 gold buttons set with diamonds, worth 4,752 ducats. In 1607, the Spanish diplomat Pedro de Zúñiga noted that Arbella's jewels were not of great value.

== February 1608 ==
Bess of Hardwick's jewellery inventories mention a pearl embroidered piece of lace for a veil (a cornet) given to Arbella. Bess eventually cancelled a bequest in her will which left her own jewels and two gold sable heads set with precious stones to her granddaughter Arbella.

The Earl of Bothwell gave Arbella's jewels to James VI and he seems (eventually) to have returned them to the family. They may appear in a list of jewels delivered to Arbella at Hardwick Hall by Lord Cavendish after the death of Bess of Hardwick on 13 February 1607/8. This schedule, now held by Derbyshire Record Office, signed by Arbella, presumably represents jewels formerly in the custody of Bess of Hardwick for Arbella, and includes:

- A rich sable, the head and claws of goldsmith work, enamelled and set with diamonds and rubies.
- Two borders of goldsmith work, one piece of one of them set with two pearls, another piece set with a diamond, another piece set with a ruby, and so throughout (alternating pieces); the other of the borders with one piece set with four round pearl, another piece set with a diamond, and so throughout.
- A chain of blood stone and goldsmith work, four score (80), and buttons enamelled with black and three white snails a piece.
- Thirteen wire work buttons. Two more.
- A clock (or watch) set with diamonds and rubies.
- A globe, set with diamonds and rubies, with a pearl pendant (Margaret Douglas' tablet enamelled like a globe)
- A seal like a pillar, set with ruby, diamond, and emerald.
- Another border of gold smith work, one piece set with a diamond, another piece set with five pearls, and so throughout this (alternating) of seventeen pieces.
- Two ropes of pearl, containing six score and five great pearl.
- Another border of goldsmith work of nineteen pieces, one piece set with four pearls, and another piece set with an emerald, and so throughout (alternating).
- A cross set with diamonds and a pearl pendant.
- Another greater cross set with diamonds, rubies, and five round pearls.
- A brooch set forth with a rock ruby, and an emerald, and a diamond.
- A ewer of chrystal trimmed with gold, set with rubies and turquoises
- A salt of agate, trimmed with gold and set with emerald,
- Three gold rings upon a pap (ring holder, a paper cylinder), a great table diamond in one ring, a pointed diamond in another, a lesser pointed diamond in another, and a rock rubie in another
- 38 pairs of black and white aglets enamelled, and three score eighteen pair and one odd one enamelled with white.

== 1611 and 1613 ==
It is unclear if Arbella ever inherited any jewels that had belonged to Mary, Queen of Scots. Before her failed attempt to escape custody, Arbella sold a collection of embroideries worked by Mary to her aunt Mary Talbot, Countess of Shrewsbury for £850. When Arbella was arrested in 1611, she listed a number of jewels which seemed to have been taken from her, including;

- A pointed Diamond ring.
- A fleur-de-lys set with diamonds, in a little box of wood
- A ship wherein was set a little sea-water green stone called an aquamarine.
- A little jewel like a cone (or corn or horn), with a great yellow stone, called a jacinth, with opals and rubies.
- A jewel like a star set with opals.
- A piece of a chain of gold set with rubies and pearls.
- Item some four (or four score, 80) pearls set upon a card with eight other less pearls.
- A watch, left in Mr. Bradshaw's trunk at Barnet.

When Arbella Stuart was a prisoner in the Tower of London in 1613, she expected to be released to attend the marriage of Princess Elizabeth on 14 February and bought pearls and a gown embroidered with pearls to wear from Abraham der Kinderen. Arbella was not invited and pawned and sold most of the pearls for funds a few months later. Abraham der Kinderen petitioned for the return of the pearl embroidered gown after her death.

In May 1613 Wiliam Waad was removed from his position as lieutenant of the Tower of London. Complaints against him included the embezzlement of valuable jewels and gold from Arbella Stuart. His wife and daughter were said to be implicated.
