= Robert le Maçon, Sieur de la Fontaine =

Robert le Maçon, Sieur de la Fontaine, or Robert Masson, (1534/35–1611) was a French Reformed minister and diplomat. He founded a church in Orléans which became central to the Huguenot movement during the first French War of Religion 1562.

== Career ==
He was born at Illiers, near Chartres, in the Orléanais, France; his parents names are unknown.

In 1557 he was one of the founding ministers of the important Reformed church in Orléans, which became the capital of the Huguenot movement during the first war of religion in France in 1562.

There he also probably met andmarried, about 1557, his first wife, Anne (d. 1605), who, according to the 1593 census of aliens in London, originally came from that city. La Fontaine (as he was usually known, being sieur de la Fontaine) fled to England at the time of the St Bartholomew's day massacre in 1572, and in October 1574 was appointed minister of the French and Walloon refugee church in London.

Throughout his long pastorate he worked diligently to establish and maintainCalvinist orthodoxy among this congregation. In 1578 he revised the church'swritten ‘discipline’, the first revision since the church had been reestablished under Elizabeth I in 1560.

He also composed a Calvinist catechism for the membersof his own flock, translated into English and published in 1580 as A catechisme and playne instruction for children which prepare themselves to communicate in theholy supper, and published in French in 1602 as Catechisme et instruction familière pour les enfans qui se preparent à communiquer à la saincte cène.

La Fontaine also maintained a correspondence with protestant leaders throughout Europe, such as Theodore Beza in Geneva and Philippe Du Plessis Mornay in France. In 1578 he helped Du Plessis compose his protestant manifesto, Traité de l'eglise. La Fontaine was an advocate of the marriage of James VI of Scotland to Catherine of Bourbon, the sister of Henry of Navarre.

During Henry IV's wars against the Catholic League and Spain in the 1590s, Du Plessis arranged to have La Fontaine appointed the French king's unofficial representative in England. La Fontaine was most heavily involved in the complex political and military negotiations between Henry IV and Elizabeth I during their mutual war against Spain from 1595 to 1598. He was in direct communication with both monarchs, and maintained a wide correspondence with influential royal councillors, such as Villeroy in France and Burghley and Robert Cecil in England, and with nobles such as the duc de Bouillon and the earl of Essex.

He was one of the few French negotiators who took part in drawing up the treaty of Greenwich in 1596, chosen because, as the chief French negotiator, De Sancy, wrote to him, "we did not think that we could employ anyone more trustworthy than you, nor one who would be more acceptable to them [the English negotiators]".

By this time La Fontaine was sixty one, and after Henry's peace with Spain in 1598 he withdrew himself from active diplomacy, but throughout the following years he continued to maintain contact with Du Plessis and remained an important link between the Huguenots in France and the English church and government. In 1601, at the French Reformed church's national synod at Gergeau, he even presented a proposal to unite the English and French churches, with little success. The previous year La Fontaine had published the first edition of a series of sermons on the story of Lot, Les funerailles de Sodome et de ses filles.

== Later life and family ==
In August 1605 hiswife, Anne, died, and six months later, on 25 February 1606, he married, as his second wife, Maturine Doute (or Doubts; d. 1621), also a native of Orléans. By the end of his life, La Fontaine had spent almost exactly half of his years in France and half in England. He died in 1611, and was buried in his parish of St Anne Blackfriars, London, on 6 November, his death even attracting the notice of John Chamberlain. and Isaac Casaubon. His widow died on 15 February 1621. His family maintained a foot in both countries. His son, Louis, a king's councillor who had assisted his father in his diplomatic activities, maintained the family name in France, as the sieur de la Fontaine et d'Ancreville. Meanwhile his three daughters—Anne, Rachel, and Sara— all married male members of the Harderet family, another prominent refugee family, and remained in England.

His father was Jacques Le Macon and his mother was Marie Jovanneux. He married his first wife, Anne, in 1557 in Orleans France. They had four children Louis, Suzanne, Marie and Anne. Fontaine became minister of the French church in London. In 1586 Francis Walsingham wrote to him, asking him to establish a French church in Scotland.

His three daughters, Sara, Rachel and Anne by his second wife, Maturine Doute, married members of the Harderet family, Huguenot merchants and goldsmiths in London.

Fontaine had business connections with a Scottish merchant George Bruce of Carnock, and in July 1588 undertook to repay a loan of £100 Stirling made to the English ambassador in Edinburgh, William Ashby.

== Sources ==
- F. de Schickler, Les églises du réfuge en Angleterre, 3 vols. (Paris, 1892)
- C. Littleton, 'The French church of London in European protestantism: the role of Robert le Maçon, dit de la Fontaine, minister, 1574–1611', Proceedings of the Huguenot Society, 26 (1994–7), 45–57 · MSS 3–4, consistory minutes, 1578–1615, French Protestant Church of London, Soho Square
- A. M. Oakley, ed., Actes du consistoire de l'église française de Threadneedle Street, Londres, 2, Huguenot Society of London, 48 (1969)
- J. H. Hessels, ed., Ecclesiae LondinoBatavae archivum, 3 vols. (1887–97) · P. Auguis, ed., Mémoires et correspondance de Philippe du PlessisMornay, 12 vols. (1824–5)
- P. Laffleur de Kermaingant, L'ambassade de France en Angleterre sous Henri IV: la mission de Jean de Thuméry (1886)
- J. Berger de Xivrey, ed., Recueil des lettres missives de Henri IV, 9 vols. (1843–75)
- Thomas Birch, Memoirs of the reign of Queen Elizabeth, 2 vols (London, 1754)
- J. Quick, Synodicon in Gallia reformata, 2 vols. (1692)
- I. Scouloudi, Returns of strangers in the metropolis, 1593, 1627, 1635, 1639: a study of an active minority, Huguenot Society of London, 57 (1985)
- W. J. C. Moens, The registers of the French church, Threadneedle Street, London, 1, Huguenot Society of London, 9 (1896) · parish register, St Ann Blackfriars, GL, MS 4510/1 [marriage, 25 Feb 1606; burial, 6 Nov 1611] *Archives: BL, Cotton MSS, Caligula E vii, ix · BL, Cotton MSS, Galba E vi, ix · BL, Lansdowne MSS 43– 55, 102–106 · LPL, papers of Anthony Bacon, MSS 654, 657 · TNA: PRO, Stat.
