= François de Civille =

French soldier and diplomat (1537–1610)

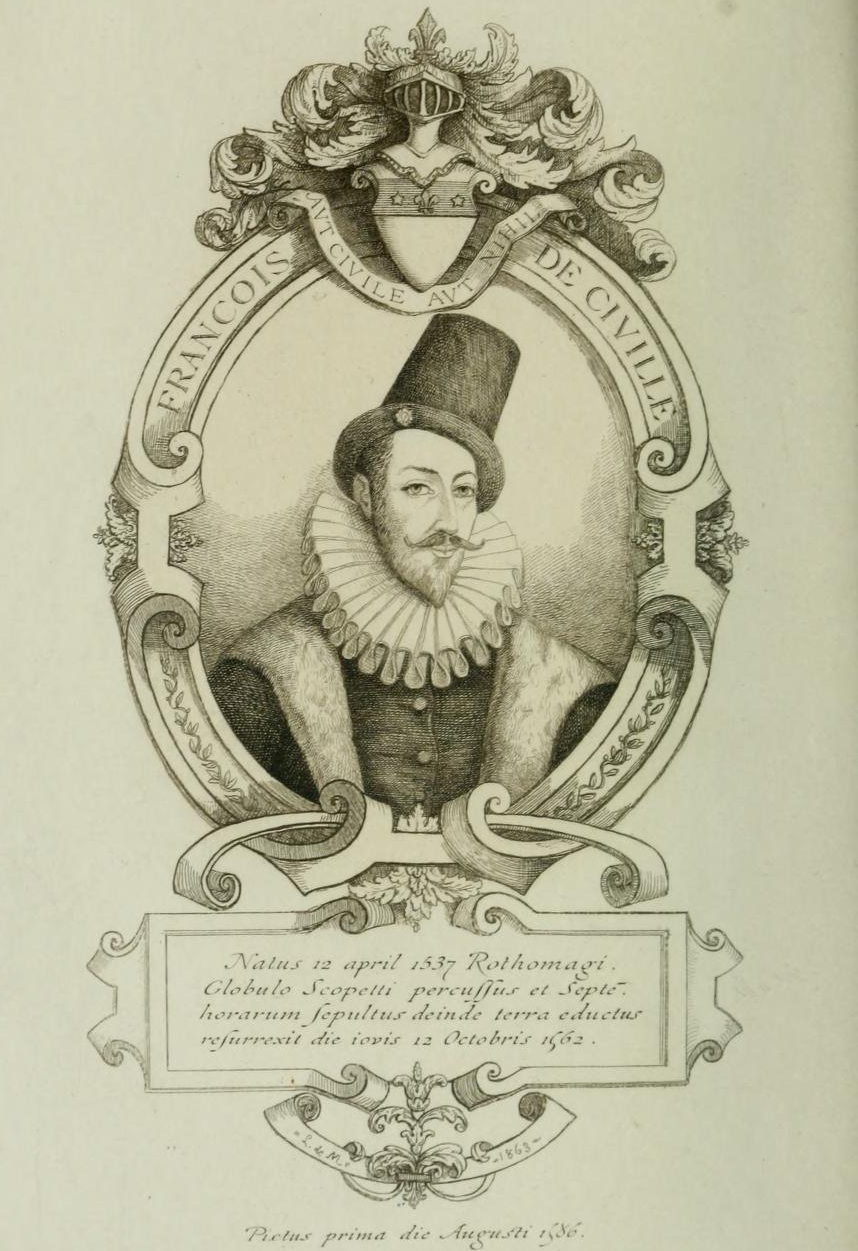
François de Civille

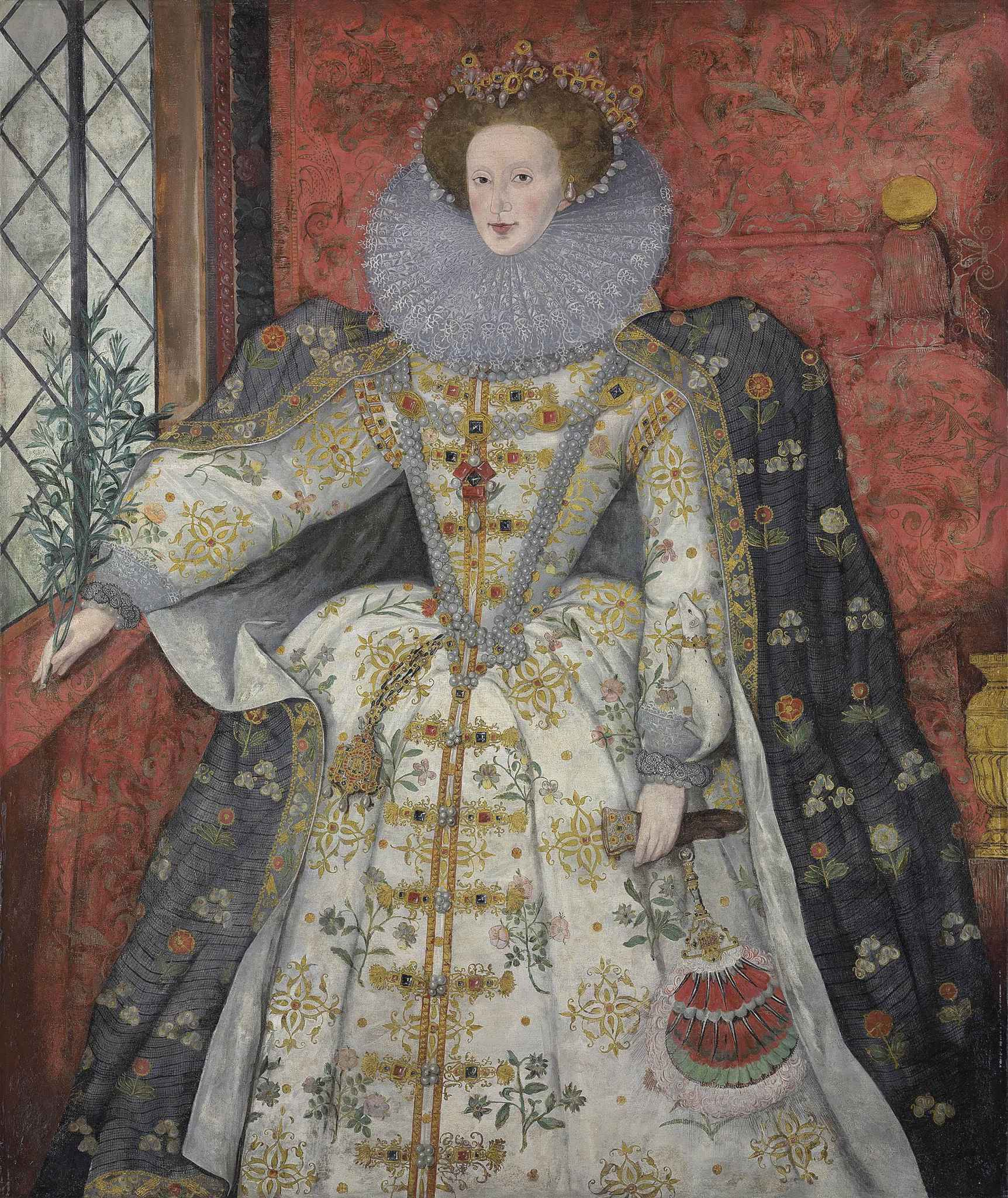
Portrait of Elizabeth I of England said to have been a gift to François de Civille in 1588.

François de Civille, seigneur de Saint-Mards (1537–1610), was a French soldier and diplomat. The Civille family of Rouen was of Spanish origin.

== Buried alive ==
François de Civille was a soldier in the French Wars of Religion. He wrote a memoir describing being found dead, buried, and resuscitated at the siege of Rouen in 1562. He was shot in the head and fell from the ramparts into the ditch, where workers buried him on 12 October 1562. Civille's groom went to collect the body to bury it properly and found he was still alive. During his recovery, soldiers looking for his younger brother discovered him in bed and threw him out of the window. He landed in a dung heap in the courtyard where he remained senseless in his night clothes for three days until he was found by his cousin. His injuries left him unable to close his mouth without pain. Subsequently, Civille would write "Dead, Buried, Resuscitated" under his signature. Civille wrote a memoir of his 1562 experience and had it printed in 1606. Pierre de L'Estoile noted its publication in July 1606. In a later addition to the story, it was said that Civille died after falling a third time, falling ill on an icy night while peeping into a neighbour's window.

== Diplomat and refugee ==
As a diplomat he worked for Françoise de Bourbon, Duchess of Bouillon, and was an informant for Francis Walsingham, reporting on English visitors at Rouen, and declared that he was as sure and constant in Walsingham's service 'as a diamond is hard'. He sent gifts of dried fruit, apples, and pears to Ursula St Barbe and Lettice Knollys, the wives of Walsingham and Robert Dudley, 1st Earl of Leicester.

He came to London and met Elizabeth I in 1584 and 1588. With Oudard de Jolitemps, he brought jewels from the Duchess of Bouillon in August 1584, visited the Earl of Huntingdon in York in September, and in October Francis Walsingham sent him a diamond ring. The Duchess had hoped they would be able to secure places for her nieces Louise and Elisabeth of Nassau in the household of Elizabeth I. They were left orphans at the assassination of William the Silent.

François and his wife, Jehanne du Mouchet, and family came to Rye in July 1585 and were listed as Protestant refugees in London in January 1586.

In 1588, Elizabeth gave him a jewel and her portrait, according to an inscription on a painting belonging to his descendants. Leaving his wife in London, he travelled to Edinburgh in March 1589 to raise an army of 3000 soldiers for Henri of Navarre and work on the unsuccessful negotiations for the marriage of James VI of Scotland to Catherine de Bourbon, the sister of Henri of Navarre.

James was advised of Civille's mission by Henri's letter of 23 December 1588. Civille arrived in Edinburgh on 10 March 1589 and had his first audience on 15 March. David Moysie wrote only that Civille was a "packet bearer" from Navarre who came for troops.

An English observer at the Scottish court Thomas Fowler wrote that Civille and Jérôme Groslot, Sieur de l’Isle encouraged Edinburgh merchants who dealt with France to support the Navarre marriage. However, James married Anne of Denmark instead. A cipher key in the Hawthornden manuscripts relates to their missions.

Civille mentioned in a letter from Wemyss that the Earl of Huntingdon was his 'old and gracious master'. Civille was given 1,200 merks on 11 September 1589 and left Scotland from Dundee accompanied by James Colville of Easter Wemyss and 1,500 Scottish troops. Adverse winds drove them back into the Firth of Forth. According to David Moysie the 1,500 soldiers had left Scotland in June 1589 Civille wrote to James VI from Dieppe on 22 August 1592.

In January 1598 Henri IV ordered Civille as "Commissaire Ordinaire des Guerres" to take command of troops at Saumur.

== Works ==
- Discours des causes pour lesquelles le sieur de Civille, gentilhomme de Normandie, se dit avoir esté mort, enterré et ressuscité (1606), Edited by Ernest Poret Blosseville, (Rouen, 1863).
- Some of Civille's letters are printed in A. Aubry, La Normandie à l'étranger: documents inédits relatifs à l'histoire de Normandie, tirés des archives étrangères XVIe et XVIIe siècles (Paris, 1873), pp. 238–254.
