= George Beeston =

Member of the Parliament of England

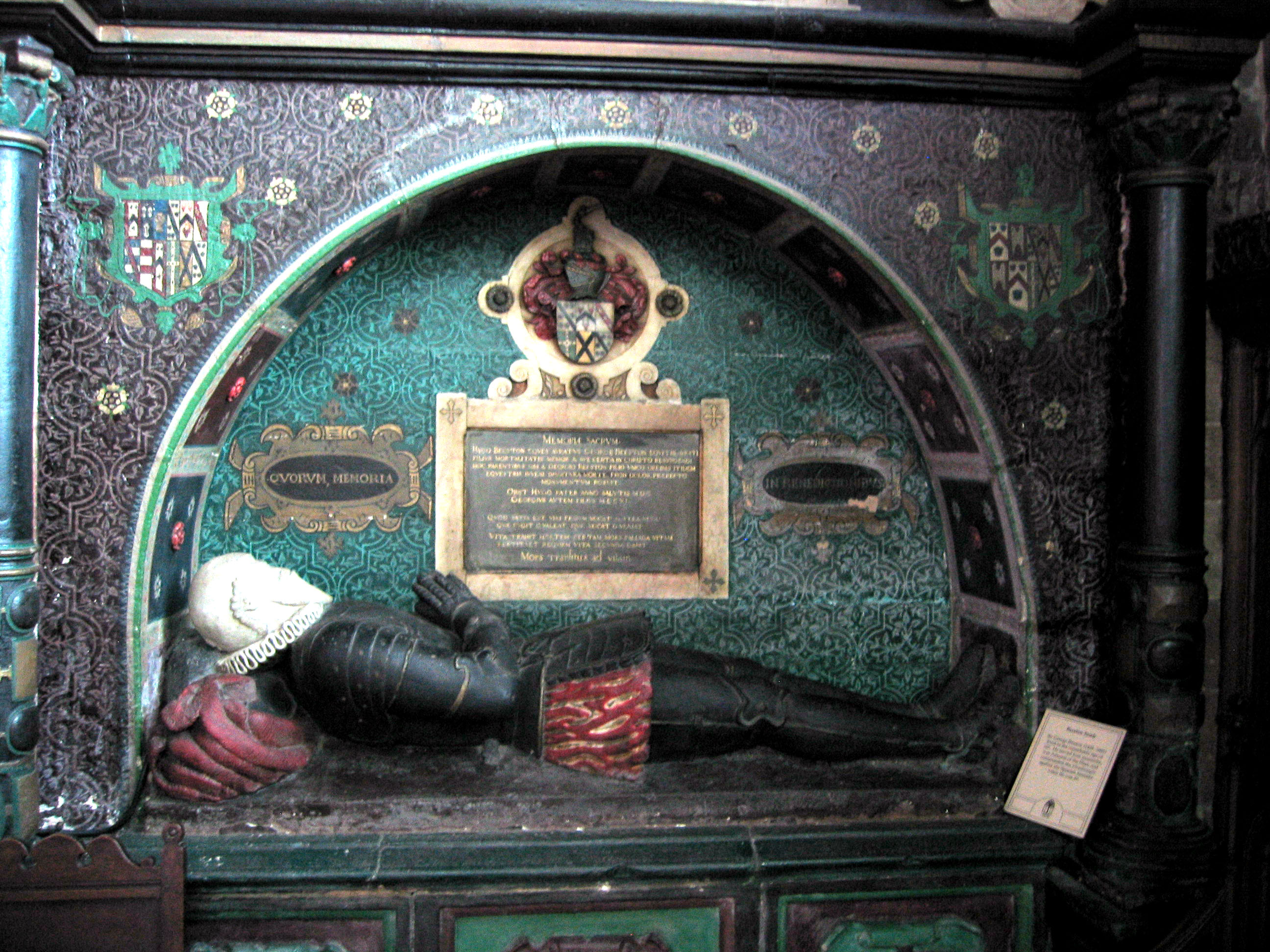
Tomb of Sir George in the chancel of St Boniface's Church, Bunbury

Sir George Beeston or Beston (circa 1520 - 13 September 1601) was an English landowner, courtier, soldier and sailor. He was the captain of the Dreadnought in 1588, Member of Parliament for Cheshire in 1589 and Ranger of Delamere Forest.

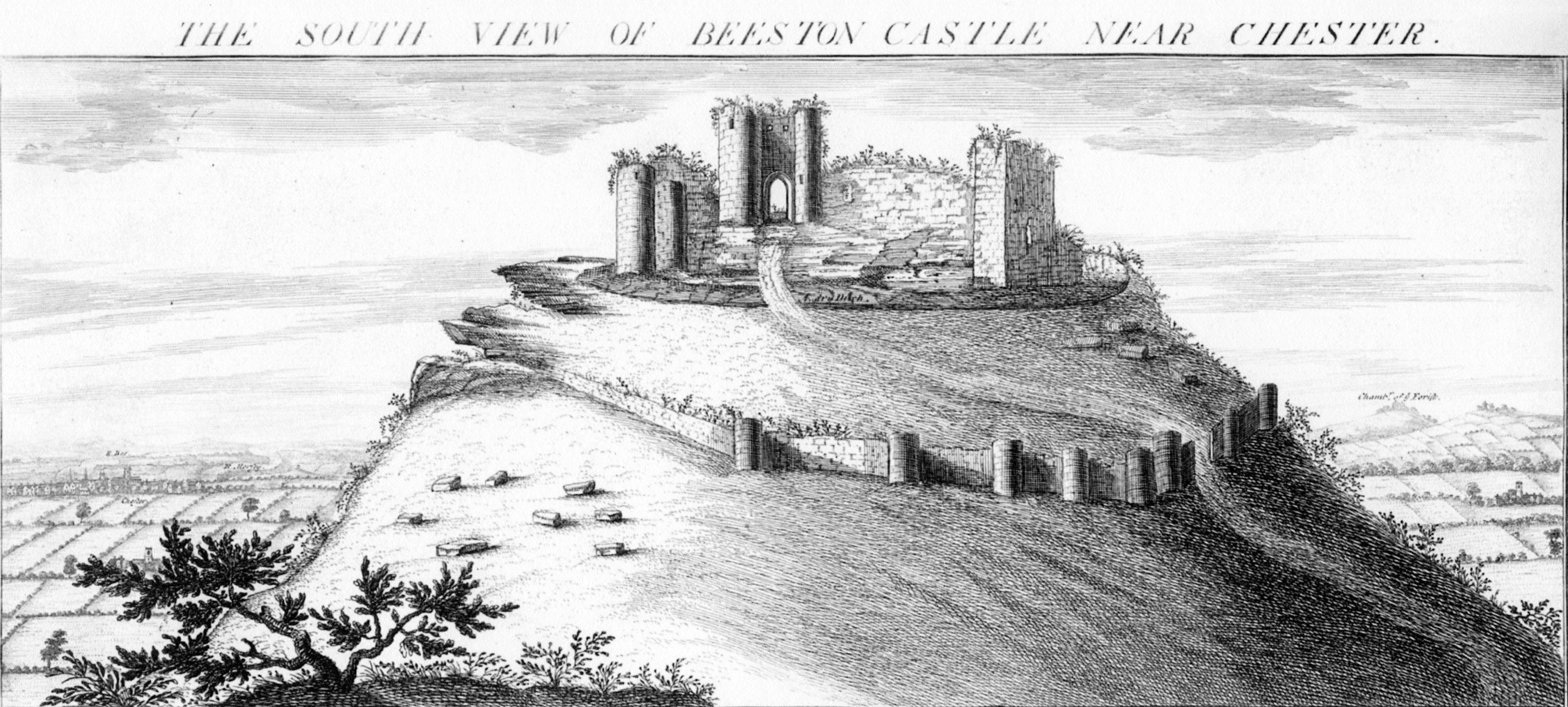
Engraving of 1727 by the Samuel and Nathaniel Buck, showing Beeston Castle from the south

== Early life ==
George Beeston was the son of John Beeston (died 1542) and Katherine Calverley, a daughter of Sir George Calverley of the Lea, Cheshire.

According to George Ormerod in his History of Cheshire (1819), his memorial in Bunbury Church states his age as 102 but he was legally declared on an inquisition post mortem to be only 22 years old when he succeeded to his father's estates in 1542, indicating a likely birth year of 1520 (i.e. 80/81 years old in 1601).

== Soldier and sailor ==
He was recorded as one of the captains ordered 'to keep the Narrow Seas' in 1562, and in charge of the land defences at Gravesend, Kent, in about 1576.

For his part in the defeat of the Spanish Armada, during which he fought as captain of the Dreadnought, Beeston was knighted on the deck of the Ark Royal by Lord Effingham on 26 July 1588. His portrait was included in the Armada Tapestries.

Beeston had already fought in France and in Scotland. Some of his biography is carved in Latin on his tomb at St Boniface's Church, Bunbury. This is a translation;

"Here lies buried George Beeston, knight, a promoter of valour and truth. He having been brought up from his youth in the arts of war was chosen one of his company of pensioners by the invincible King Henry VIII when he besieged Boulogne, he merited the same under Edward VI in the battle against the Scots at Musselburgh. Afterwards under the same King, under Mary, and under Elizabeth, in the naval engagements as captain or vice-captain of the fleet, by whom, after that most mighty Spanish fleet of 1588, had been vanquished, he was honoured with the order of knighthood; and now, his years pressing heavily on him, when he had admirably approved his integrity to princes, and his bravery to his adversaries, acceptable to God, and dear to good men, and long expecting Christ, in the year 1601 he fell asleep in Him, so that he may rise again in Him with joy.

And together with him rests a most beloved wife, Alice, daughter of (Thomas) Davenport of Henbury, esquire, a matron most holy, chaste, and liberal to the poor, who, when she had lived in matrimony 66 years, and had borne to her husband three sons, John, Hugh, and Hugh, and as many daughters, Ann, Jane, and Dorothy, passed into the heavenly country in the year 1591 with Christ for ever to live.
The dutifulness of their son Hugh Beeston, esquire, the younger, Receiver General of all the revenues of the Crown as well as in the county palatine of Chester as in the counties of North Wales, set up this monument to parents most excellent and beloved.

Hugh Beeston, knight, son of George Beeston, knight, mindful of mortality, and in certain hope of rising again in Christ, placed this monument to his parents, himself, and George Beeston an only son, of the same knightly order, a youth, alas! snatched away by a too early death. Hugh, the father, died in the year of our salvation, 1627, but George, the son, 1611.

== Edinburgh ==
The year after the victory against the Spanish armada, Beeston took a fleet to Scotland. Their purpose was likely a show of support for the Danish marriage. On 1 June 1589 Beeston arrived in the Forth on the Vanguard followed by Edward Croft in the Tiger with the Achates. Beeston's passenger Francis Clarkson brought a letter from Francis Walsingham for William Ashby, the English ambassador at the Scottish court.

James VI had a proclamation made at the Mercat Cross of Edinburgh and at the Shore and Pier of Leith urging the townspeople to welcome the "nearest friends confederates to this realm, lately repaired within the same, with some ships of war of ready to fulfill and follow his Majesty's direction."

However, an unfortunate incident embarrassed James VI. On 5 June some of the English crewmen came ashore into Edinburgh to shop and sightsee. Three got in to a fight in a tavern, one was stabbed, and then as they returned to Leith and their ship they were attacked by a group of Spanish sailors, and one man, a trumpet officer or signaller, was killed. The trumpet player's name seems not be recorded. Beeston and the English ambassador William Ashby had an audience with James VI on 7 June at the Palace of Holyroodhouse seeking an enquiry and justice. Ashby and an Englishman at the Scottish court, Thomas Fowler wrote that the king treated the sailors honourably. Fowler wrote:

This day the Capteynes of the Vangard and Tygar hathe byn a borde and with the King, who takes it marveylowse kyndly that they were apoynted to offer him service, and is not a lyttel prowde that he used them well; but the villanouse base papists and Spanyers together myused sum of the people, and slue a trompetour; wheareupon the King was extreme angry, and willed me that a demand should be put in to the Cowncell for justice, and it should be granted, for so he wold see it".

James VI gave Beeston a locket set with diamonds and 100 gold crowns and gold chains and rings provided by the goldsmith Thomas Foulis to his captains. James VI requested that Edinburgh town council give him, his three captains, and the English ambassadors an "honest banquet" in Nicol Edward's house. William Fairlie organised the banquet.

Beeston sailed with the ebb tide on 15 June, with James's letter for Elizabeth.

== Later life ==
Beeston was paid in 1592 as the keeper of the blockhouse called Wilton or Milton Bulwark near Gravesend. He wished to resign the keepership of the blockhouse in 1596 citing his age at over 85 years. He was the owner of the manor of Beeston and Beeston Castle. Elizabeth granted him lands in Ireland near Kilmallock conjointly with his cousin Lawrence or Lancelot Bostock.

He died in 1601 and was buried at Bunbury.

On 19 February 1645 his former residence Beeston Hall was burnt down by the order of Prince Rupert to prevent it being garrisoned by Parliamentarian troops in the English Civil War.

== Family ==
George Beeston married firstly Alice Davenport (d. 1591). Their children included;

- Hugh Beeston, married Thomasin Coplestone. Secondly in 1579 Margaret Ireland widow of John Aston, possibly thirdly Mary Chetwode. The children of Hugh and Thomasin included George and John. This George Beeston married Eleanor Cave and died while hunting with King James after a fall from his horse. Eleanor, his widow, married Thomas Roe. John Beeston married Prudence Bulmer, a daughter of Bevis Bulmer.
- Hugh Beeston, younger, married Margaret Downes (d. 1615), widow of Philip Worth
- Jane Beeston, married (1) Geffrey Shakerley (2) Christopher Holford.
- Dorothy Beeston, married John Coplestone.

He married secondly Margaret Ireland (a relation of his son's second wife), they had no children. He married thirdly Mary Chetwode, they had no children. However, it has been suggested that Mary Chetwode was the third wife of his son Hugh Beeston, elder.
