= Abraham Harderet =

English goldsmith and jeweller

Abraham Harderet (fl. 1604–1625), goldsmith and jeweller to Elizabeth I of England and Anne of Denmark.

== Career ==
Abraham Harderet was the son of Martin Harderet and Rachel Fontaine or Le Maçon, daughter of Robert le Maçon, Sieur de la Fontaine, a refugee from the St. Bartholomew's Day massacre. The family were French Huguenots and the name was also written as "Hardret" and "Hardrett". Martin Hardrett supplied pearls for head dresses of masque costume at Elizabeth's court and was described as a "milliner". In 1604 Abraham claimed that Queen Elizabeth had owed him £1,075, and he was appointed a jeweller to King James I, Anne of Denmark, and Prince Henry with an annual salary of £50.

Jacob, Martin and Nathaniel Harderet were also active as jewellers in this period. King James I gave Abraham and Martin a gift of £200 confiscated from recusants in 1604, Abraham and Nathaniel were confirmed as jewellers to the king in 1608, and Jacob, Abraham's brother, enlarged a chain for Princess Elizabeth in 1610. Martin had been recorded as "Martyn Harderettes", a "stranger" or foreigner in St Faith's parish in Farringdon, London, in 1582. Listed next to Martin Harderet in 1582, another of the St Faith's strangers was "Robert Fountayne" who was probably Rachel's father, while "Cornelis Dregg" or "Drodger" may be the Dutch craftsman who engraved a sapphire with Queen Elizabeth's portrait for Anne of Denmark in 1598. Cornelius "Draggie" turned up in Edinburgh in 1601, attempting to set up a weaver's workshop to exploit generous subsidies for expert craftsmen, but the other weavers protested he was a lapidary, not a weaver.

Martin was probably the Martin Hardrett who supplied items to the queen's revels as a "Milliner" as early as 1574. Another early reference appears in a 1583 letter from William Poyntz to his master Sir Thomas Heneage about London shopping, "If your bracelet be done at Hyllyard's, you shall receive it by this bearer, Hardret hath not one of those glasses you wrote to me for, nor yet any other".

In June 1604, Abraham Harderet after petitioning the Earl of Salisbury and the Earl of Nottingham for a place as a court jeweller, was invited to draft the details of the office of Surveyor of Jewels, and was made a jeweller to King, Queen and Prince of Wales. However, perhaps in 1607, Harderet complained to the Earl of Salisbury that he had not yet had any employment. His wife was lame and ill in bed. He sent a list of outstanding debts and losses. He had invested in a ship lost on the Barbary coast. Some of associates were "broken" or bankrupt. "Lord Amberall" owed £466.

Harderet was paid a fee of £50 annually as a jeweller to Anne of Denmark.

In 1608 Martin Harderet was a witness at the christening of James Oliver, a son of the portrait miniature painter Isaac Oliver, and he may have provided cases for Oliver's miniatures. Abraham and Martin Harderet were paid £3000 from the confiscated goods of recusants. Martin died in April 1612, amongst his bequests leaving a house in Compiègne to Abraham.

=== Jewels for Princess Elizabeth ===
Jacob Harderet supplied pendants and rings to Princess Elizabeth in April 1612. On 14 February 1613, Princess Elizabeth married Frederick V of the Palatinate. Jacob Harderet provided diamond and ruby rings and pendants for Elizabeth to give away as she left England, and she wrote directly to Sir Julius Caesar, Chancellor of the Exchequer to pay his bill of £500. He accompanied Princess Elizabeth on her journey to Heidelberg. At Gaulsheim she gave gifts to those of her party returning to England. Harderet gave her these on credit. He returned to England with her letter to John Murray of the Bedchamber, which explained that she had been obliged to buy jewels from him to give as gifts at her wedding and during her journey, even to "indifferent persons", many more than she could pay for, and Harderet could show Murray the bills she had signed. Elizabeth wanted Murray to arrange that Sir Julius Caesar would write an order pay Harderet.

=== Business in London ===
Abraham Harderet, with the other royal jewellers George Heriot, William Herrick and John Spilman, joined the funeral procession of Anna of Denmark in 1619.

Rachel Fontaine was a relation of Jehanne Hersent, the wife of Abraham Aurelle the minister of the French Church on Threadneedle Street. In October 1613 she was a witness at the christening of their daughter Jahel, with Abraham van Delden and Jaél de Peigne, widow of Sir Henry Killigrew. Rachel's daughter Elizabeth Harderet married Caesar Calandrini, a minister of the Italian church in London, from Lucca. Her sister-in-law Elizabeth Calandrini was the wife of the financier Philip Burlamachi.

Abraham Harderet was still listed as a jeweller to King James in 1625.
