= James Colville, 1st Lord Colville of Culross =

Scottish soldier, courtier, and diplomat

James Colville, 1st Lord Colville of Culross (1551–1629) was a Scottish soldier, courtier, and diplomat.

== Life ==
James Colville was the son of James Colville of East Wemyss (d. 1562) and Janet Douglas, a daughter of Robert Douglas of Lochleven and Margaret Erskine.

Before becoming Lord Colville, he was known as the "Laird of East Wemyss", and often simply as the "Laird of Wemyss".

He was a distinguished soldier who fought in France for Henry, Prince of Navarre, later King Henry IV. He returned to Scotland in 1582 along with Francis Stewart, Earl of Bothwell, loaded down with commendations from his French patrons. He was involved in the Ruthven raid, on 22 August of that year.

Colville owned a ship, the Good Company which was robbed by pirates at Great Yarmouth in June 1583. The master of the boat, James Cowan, was tortured to reveal the whereabouts of any money. Their sails of new French canvas were taken, and their cargo of Flemish tables and timber beds worth £200 Scots was thrown in the sea. Colville was at that time ambassador in London with Colonel William Stewart. He sent his goods and purchases back to Scotland in a ship from Prestonpans which was also robbed by pirates.

Colville was sent to London and Navarre in March 1589. James VI gave him and Richard Cockburn £666 Scots for their expenses. He was to discuss with Queen Elizabeth the rights of James VI to lands owned by his grandmother Margaret Douglas, Countess of Lennox, and announce the king's intention to marry Anne of Denmark, a younger daughter of Frederick II of Denmark. James VI was not inclined to marry the Catherine de Bourbon, sister of Henry of Navarre. The English ambassador in Scotland, William Asheby wrote to William Cecil that Colville was "right well affected towards her majesty, and a furtherer of all good courses betwixt these two crowns".

James VI rewarded him for his service, especially as a diplomat abroad in religious causes, with the lands and Abbey of Culross in June 1592.

In April 1594, with Edward Bruce, he was sent to London as an ambassador. They were to invite Queen Elizabeth to send a representative to the baptism of Prince Henry, discuss the matter of the Earl of Bothwell, Catholics in Scotland, and ask for the yearly sum of money that Elizabeth gave to James VI. They were to ensure the money was paid to Thomas Foulis. James VI gave Edward Bruce £1,000 Scots for their expenses. Colville was to continue to France, and invite Henry IV to send a representative to the christening, investigate the debts and revenues of Mary, Queen of Scots, and if necessary help to bring peace in France with James's cousins, the Dukes of Guise and Mayenne.

Anthony Bacon, a follower of the Earl of Essex, wrote that Colville came to see Elizabeth again in January 1595 and she was critical of his mission to France. After his audience he came out of the queen's privy chamber and asked the Lord Chamberlain, Henry Carey, if he could now see Sir Robert Cecil. He was told that Cecil had been in the privy chamber with him. Sir George Carey joked that Colville had missed him because he was so little, so short. Colville told Bacon that he laughed at this.

After James VI of Scotland came to the English throne in 1603, Colville was one of James's main supporters in the Jacobean debate on the Union.

== Family ==
His first marriage was in 1570 to Isabel Ruthven, daughter of Patrick Ruthven, 3rd Lord Ruthven, with whom he had five children. His eldest son, Robert, Master of Colville (d. 1614) married Christian Colville, a daughter of George Bruce of Carnock. A daughter Jean married James Campbell of Lawers in 1595.

In 1599 he remarried Helen Schaw, niece of William Schaw, an event which caused a feud with Francis Mowbray, brother of Helen's dead husband, Robert Mowbray. They had a further child together.

Calvin's case, the leading legal test of the status of citizenship after the 1603 union of the crowns of England and Scotland, was at least notionally concerned with the legal rights of Colville's young grandson James.

== Notes ==
Peerage of Scotland
New creation	Lord Colville of Culross; 1604–1629	Succeeded by James Colville
