= John Colville (c. 1540–1605) =

Scottish clergyman and politician (died 1605)

John Colville (c. 1540–1605), Scottish clergyman, judge, politician and author, was the son of Robert Colville of Cleish, in Kinross.

== Career ==
Educated at the University of St Andrews, he became a Presbyterian minister, but occupied himself chiefly with political intrigue, sending secret information to the English government concerning Scottish affairs. He joined the party of the Earl of Gowrie, and took part in the Raid of Ruthven in 1582. He was sent with Colonel Stewart as ambassador to England in April 1583. They were instructed to work for the amity between Scotland and England and to ask for titles to the Lennox estates in England and annual payments which would eventually be made as a subsidy given to James VI.

In August 1583, Robert Bowes noted that James Colville, the laird of Easter Wemyss, one of the masters of the king's household, had begged for and obtained remission for his fault at Ruthven Castle.

In 1587, Colville for a short time occupied a seat on the judicial bench, and was burgh commissioner for Stirling in the Parliament of Scotland.

Colville was in London in 1589 and collected £1000, a gift from Queen Elizabeth to James VI of Scotland, and £2000 worth of gilt silver plate supplied by the London goldsmith Richard Martin and silk fabrics supplied by William Stone. This present, a magnificent cupboard of plate, was intended for the reception of Anne of Denmark. Later, there were rumours that Colville had not delivered all of the silver. James VI sent receipts to the English ambassador to exonerate him.

In December 1591 he was implicated in the Earl of Bothwell's attack on Holyrood Palace, and was outlawed with the earl. He retired abroad, and is said to have joined the Roman Church.

James VI wrote to Robert Bowes in March 1594 asking that John Colville should be reimbursed for his services from the English subsidy to the tune of £1266 sterling.

In July 1594 Colville reported a rumour at the Scottish court that James VI had conceived a jealousy against Anne of Denmark, and even thought the Duke of Lennox might be the father of Prince Henry. James was beginning to regret the expense of the preparations for the Prince's baptism. In a letter of November 1595 to the English diplomat Robert Bowes he refers to Elizabeth I as a "Deborah", who "shall yet prevail over all her idolatrous foes".

Colville died in Paris in 1605.

== Works ==
Colville was the author of several works, including an Oratio Funebris on Elizabeth I of England, and some political and religious controversial essays. He is said to be the author also of The Historie and Life of King James the Sext (edited by T. Thompson for the Bannatyne Club, Edinburgh, 1825).

Colville's Original Letters, 1582–1603, published by the Bannatyne Club in 1858, contains a biographical memoir by the editor, David Laing.

== Marriage and children ==
Colville married Janet Russell, a sister of the advocate John Russell, in July 1572. Their children included:

- Robert Colville
- Thomas Colville.
- Margaret Colville, who married in December 1595 Sir Jerome Lindsay of Annatland, Lord Lyon King of Arms, son of David Lindsay, minister of Leith, and first wife Joneta Ramsay.
