= Catherine of Bourbon =

- Regent of Béarn
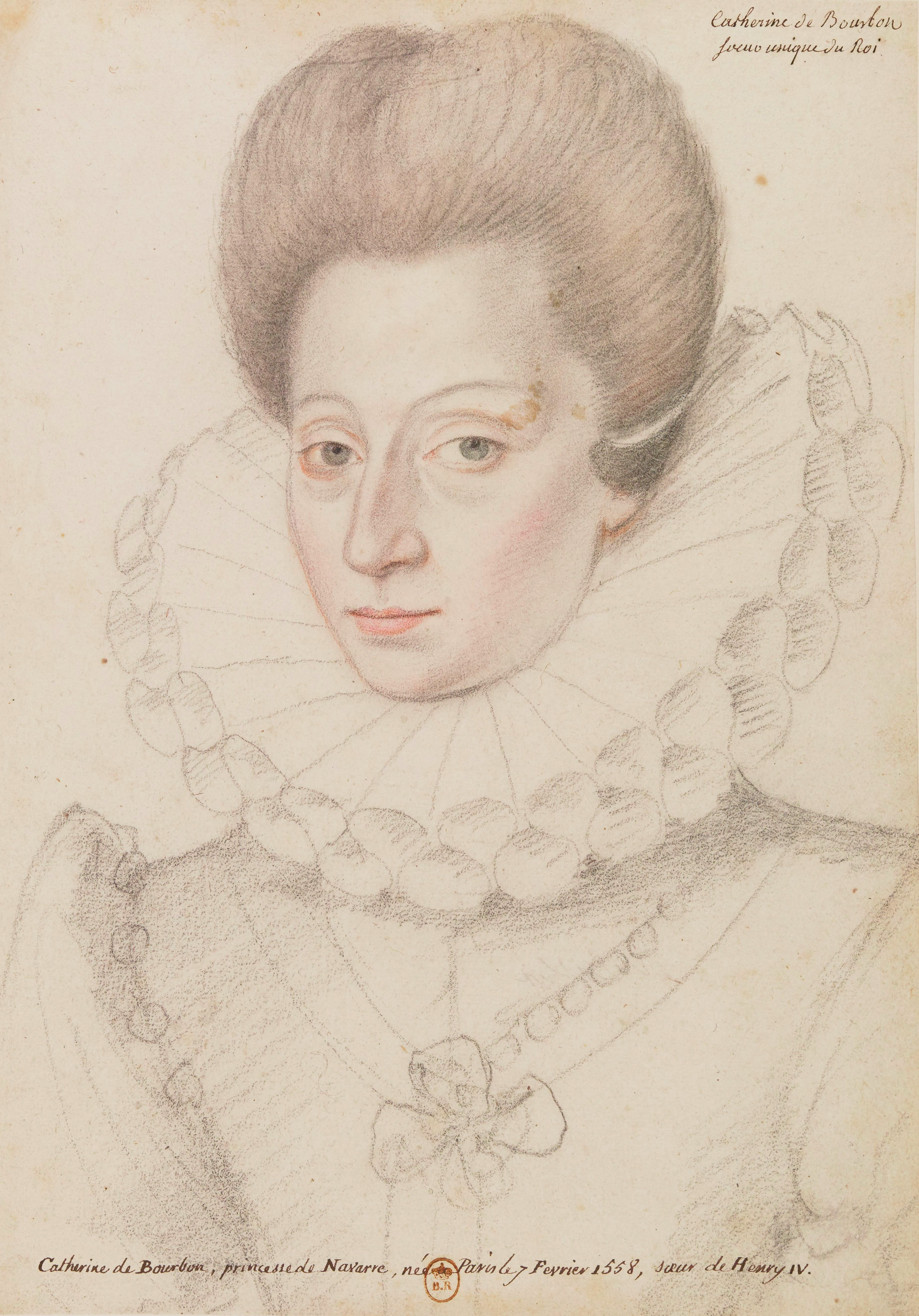
- Portrait by Nicolas Quesnel, 1594
- Born: 7 February 1559; Paris, France
- Died: 13 February 1604 (aged 45); Ducal Palace of Nancy, Lorraine
- Spouse: Henry of Lorraine (m. 1599)
- House: Bourbon
- Father: Antoine of Bourbon
- Mother: Jeanne III of Navarre
- Religion: Calvinism

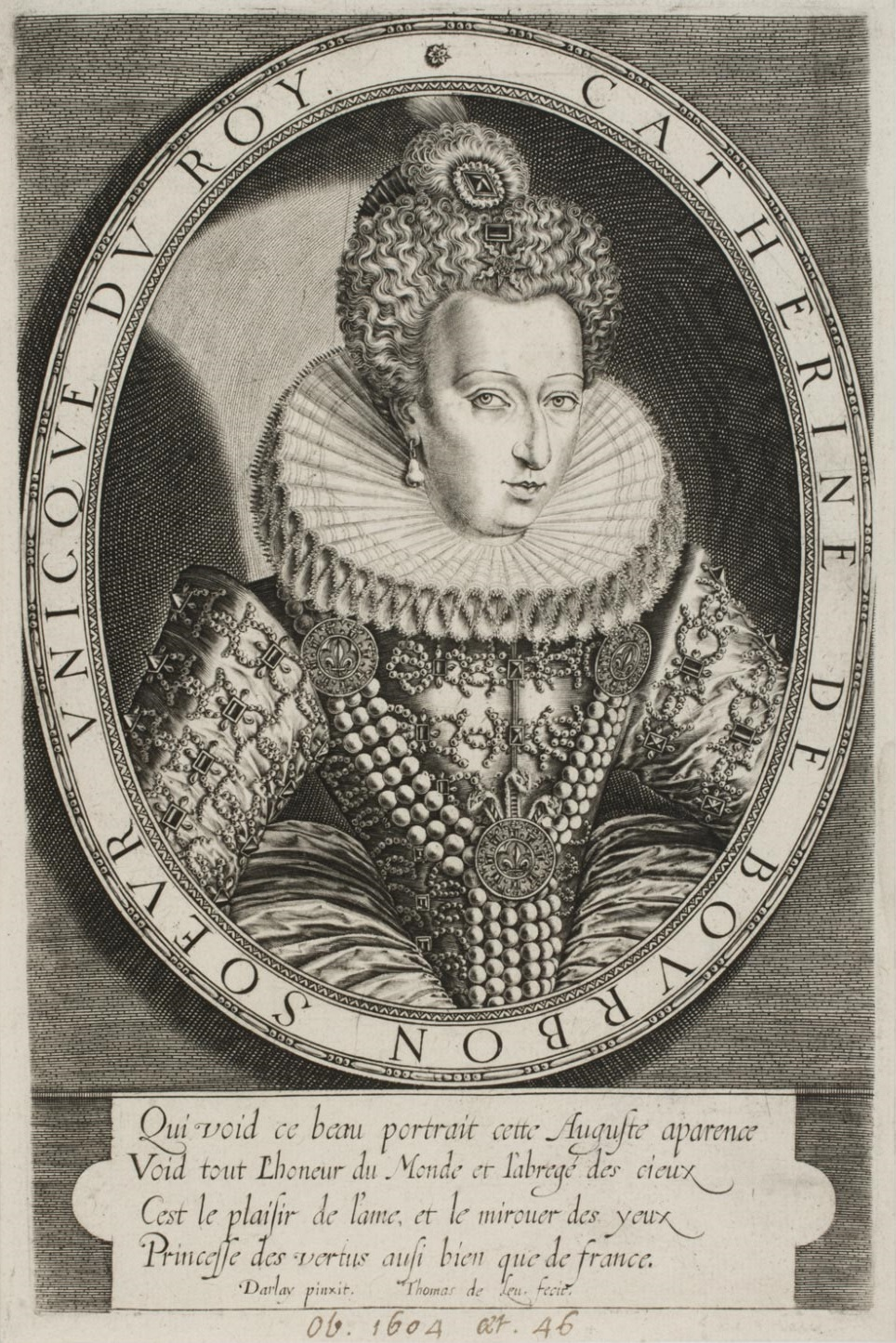
Catherine, engraved by Thomas de Leu

Catherine of Bourbon (7 February 1559 – 13 February 1604) was a Navarrese princess regent. She was the daughter of Queen Jeanne III of Navarre and King Antoine de Bourbon. She ruled the principality of Béarn in the name of her brother, King Henry III of Navarre, from 1576 until 1596.

== Early life ==
Catherine was born on 7 February 1559 to Queen Jeanne III of Navarre and her husband and co-ruler, Antoine of Bourbon. She was named after her godmother, the French queen Catherine de' Medici.

Jeanne converted to Calvinism a year after Catherine's birth and declared it the official religion of the Kingdom of Navarre. Antoine, conversely, remained a Catholic and turned against his wife and threatened to divorce her. He died fighting for the Catholic cause on 17 November 1562. Catherine was with her mother and elder brother, Henry, as they fought for the Protestant cause. The Queen died on 9 June 1572, and Catherine's custody was assigned to Catherine de' Medici and Charles IX. During the St. Bartholomew's Day Massacre, Catherine and her brother were forced to convert to Catholicism. After the death of Charles IX in 1574, the new king, Henry III, considered marrying Catherine. She almost married James VI of Scotland, and her brother sent ambassadors to Edinburgh to advocate the marriage, including Claude de l'Isle, François de Civille, and Jérôme Groslot.

== Political service ==
Catherine's brother, successor of Queen Jeanne III, was generally absent from the principality. After his escape from captivity in 1576, he entrusted Catherine with the government of Béarn. She served almost continuously as regent until 1596, where among her other responsibilities, she, a staunch Protestant, hosted Antonio Perez, a famous Spanish Catholic refugee from King Philip II. After the accession of her brother Henry to the French throne in 1589, as Henry IV of France, she was created Duchess of Albret and Countess of Armagnac. Appointed by her brother to sit on his Council as a representative of French Protestant interests in 1598, she set about persuading the Huguenots to agree to the Edict of Nantes.

== Marriage ==
As part of the treaty of Saint-Germain-en-Laye between King Henry IV of France and Charles III, Duke of Lorraine, it was agreed that Catherine, the King's sister, should marry Charles' elder son, Henry of Lorraine (1563–1624). The marriage agreement was signed on 13 July 1598. However, Catherine was a confirmed Calvinist, who refused to convert to Roman Catholicism, whilst her husband was a devout Catholic, and a former member of the Holy League.

Thus, a papal dispensation was required to allow the two to marry, but on 29 December 1598, Pope Clement VIII declared himself opposed to the marriage. Dissatisfied, Henry IV intimidated the Archbishop of Reims into granting an authorisation of marriage. This was made at Saint-Germain-en-Laye on 31 January 1599. Henry eventually secured Papal agreement. Until the birth of her nephew on 27 September 1601, she was heiress presumptive to the Navarrese crown. However, Catherine was not married long before she died, childless. Her husband remarried to Margherita Gonzaga, a niece of Marie de Medici (Henry IV's second wife).

== Writings ==
Catherine of Bourbon was also a writer. Her works consist principally of sonnets and correspondence.

== Sources ==
- Roelker, Nancy Lyman (1968). Queen of Navarre, Jeanne d'Albret, 1528-1572. Harvard University Press.
