= Thomas Fowler (courtier) =

English lawyer and diplomat

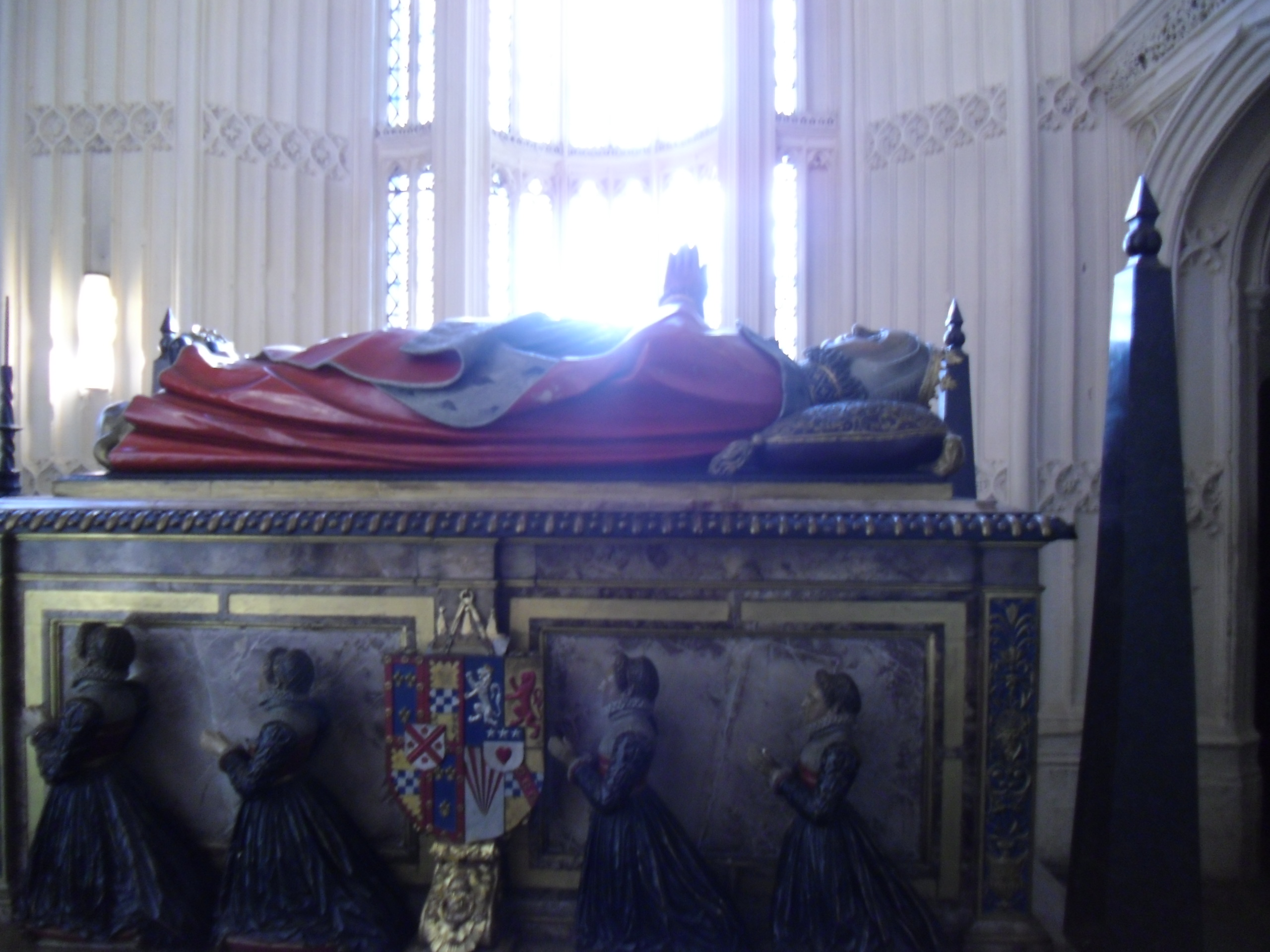
The tomb of Margaret Douglas in Westminster Abbey was inscribed, "This work was completed at the charge of Thomas Fowler, the executor of this lady, 24 Oct 1578"

Thomas Fowler (died 1590) was an English lawyer, diplomat, courtier, spy, servant of the Countess of Lennox, broker of the marriage of Mary, Queen of Scots and Lord Darnley, steward of the Earl of Leicester, advisor to James VI of Scotland and the Scottish ambassador in London, Archibald Douglas.

== The Fowler family in Scotland and England ==
John Knox and the English diplomat Thomas Randolph wrote that Thomas Fowler was an Englishman. It is not known if Thomas was any relation of the Scottish poet and royal secretary William Fowler.

The Fowler surname is found in the parish registers of Settrington, Margaret Douglas' Yorkshire manor, and Thomas may have been a member of an English family, or perhaps a Scottish family settled in England, attached to the Lennox household. In 1562, Fowler, clerk of the Countess' kitchen, was noted with Laurence Nisbet, Francis Yaxley, and Hugh Allan, the schoolmaster, as a potential witness against the Countess. This Fowler had killed a stranger servant (meaning not English) in 1561.

There were two other notable contemporary Thomas Fowlers in London; the "comptroller of the works" (paymaster of the royal works d. 1595), who married for his second wife a Margaret Johnson who has been mistakenly identified as the mother of the poet Ben Jonson; and Sir Thomas Fowler of Islington.

== Scotland's flying post ==
Thomas Fowler (called "Mr" meaning he was a university graduate) was employed in the English household of Margaret Douglas, Countess of Lennox. He came to Edinburgh briefly on behalf of the Earl of Lennox on 10 November 1564, and returned in March bring a license for Lennox to come to Scotland. William Cecil became interested in Fowler's activities and obtained a sheet of his notes on business and news memoranda. The English diplomat in Scotland Thomas Randolph, who would shortly become Master of the Posts called Fowler the "Flying Post." Fowler brought letters in cipher from William Maitland of Lethington to Mary. One message in April 1565 saddened the court, and an entertainment where Mary and her ladies were to go in Edinburgh dressed as "bourgeois wives" was put aside.

After Fowler had slandered one of Randolph's men in June 1565, one of Fowler's servants fought a duel with Randolph's servant and lost two fingers. Before the wedding of Mary and Darnley, Fowler, "old Lady Seton", and David Rizzio were with the couple when they walked in disguise or masque costume on Edinburgh's High Street. Fowler was credited for having brought Lord Darnley to Scotland.

In September 1565 Randolph listed him, an Englishman, with the Italians David Riccio and Francisco de Busso as "unworthy persons" and foreigners who were exciting suspicion for their influence at court. John Knox recorded the same point about Fowler's undue influence, made in September by the Scottish lords of parliament.

In December 1565 Fowler was discharged from Darnley's service in disgrace and he wrote to the Countess that Lord Darnley had attended Catholic mass on Christmas Day. He brought the Earl of Lennox's letter from Glasgow to the Countess, which mentions his leaving Darnley's service.

On 27 December 1566 Fowler cut off his beard, assumed the name "Forster", took ship from Leith for England on the Ayde of Pittenweem, was arrested in London and sentenced to death. William Cecil obtained information about his contacts and movements between Scotland and England. Maitland of Lethington and Queen Mary wrote to Elizabeth I of England to beg for his life. Queen Mary wrote to Elizabeth on 2 February for his release, naming him "Foulard".

Continuing to serve the Lennoxes, Fowler was in Scotland in December 1570 and the Earl, now Regent Lennox paid the expenses of his return to England. Fowler was arrested in July 1574. Francis Walsingham drew up a list of questions for his interrogation. Walsingham wanted to know if Fowler had been at Temple Newsam in the previous summer and if he knew of discussions about a marriage between Bess of Hardwick's daughter, Elizabeth Cavendish and Margaret's son, Charles Stuart, Lord Darnley and Earl of Lennox. Walsingham also wanted to know if he knew about correspondence between Margaret Douglas, John Lesley Bishop of Ross the secretary of Mary, Queen of Scots and the Laird of Kilsyth, and was also curious about a Spanish and a Portuguese man who may have visited the Countess' house in Hackney. Fowler was kept prisoner and Walsingham asked the Earl of Huntingdon to interrogate him again in December 1574. (Huntingdon worked for the Council of the North, so this suggests that Fowler was detained at York, near Margaret's estate at Settrington.)

When the Countess died in 1578, Fowler was named her sole executor. He was bequeathed the sheep at Settrington and custody of all her "clocks, watches and dials." He was responsible for the construction of her tomb at Westminster Abbey. The chronicle writer Raphael Holinshed mentioned that the tomb, which also commemorated Charles, Earl of Lennox who died in 1577, was almost completed in Margaret's lifetime. Mary, Queen of Scots required him to deliver to Bess of Hardwick any jewels that the Countess had left to Arbella Stuart.

=== In the London household of the Earl of Leicester ===
Fowler joined the household of Robert Dudley, Earl of Leicester, serving as his steward. In November 1581 John Selby of Twizel sent Fowler and the Earl of Leicester news of Scottish politics from Berwick. Selby asked Fowler, who was then living in Aldersgate Street in London, to pass his compliments to Roger Aston, an English courtier of James VI. Around this time, Fowler was mentioned in letters of Mary, Queen of Scots, to the French ambassador Michel de Castelnau encoded in cipher.

When John Colville sent news of the Gowrie Regime to Walsingham in June 1583, he asked him to inform Leicester, but not tell Fowler details about Colonel Stewart, "for he will reveal it again." Fowler sent news of Francis Walsingham's mission to Scotland after the fall of the Ruthven Regime to the Earl of Shrewsbury on 10 August 1583 from Woodhouse in Nottinghamshire.

in August 1585, Elizabeth I gave him a lease of the grange at Lasingby or Lazenby, in consideration of his long service to Lady Margaret Douglas. Fowler was at the camp at Tilbury in August 1588 with the Leicester during the crisis of the Armada.

== In Scotland ==
Following Leicester's death Fowler retired to Scotland without permission. The English privy council at the request of the Countess of Leicester ordered a search of his house in Bishopsgate. James VI of Scotland discussed a possible marriage between Arbella Stuart and Ludovic Stewart, 2nd Duke of Lennox. Fowler advised against this, and James also considered if he had the right to bestow Arbella as a bride. In October 1588, Chancellor Maitland began in confide in him over the issue of the Scottish royal marriage, "as if they had been acquainted seven-year." At this time he became estranged from his second wife Elizabeth who remained in London. Her parents, who lived at the "Spittle", had a dispute with Fowler. (Elizabeth's surname was "Mainie" or "Venstrie.") Fowler wrote from Aberdeen to English ambassador in Edinburgh, William Asheby, on 28 July 1589 that James VI was keen to marry Anne of Denmark and would not press details of their marriage contract;

It is thought the King will not insist upon his hard conditions; "for the cheffe of all is that the yonge ladi is so far in love with the Kinges majeste as it were deathe to hir to have it broken of, and hathe made good proffe divers ways of hir affecyon, which his majeste is apt inowghe to requite."

In August from Edzell Castle, Fowler wrote to Walsingham that James VI would often ask him about the possibility of Queen Elizabeth sending him money for the marriage expenses. Fowler was on progress with the King and returned with him to Falkland Palace, where he wrote to Walsingham about the possibility of gaining official diplomatic status. When Fowler resided at Whittingehame Tower, the home of Richard Douglas, in October 1589, James VI was told that Fowler planned to secretly leave Scotland from there.

Fowler began to discuss the King's marriage plans with William Cecil, and the business of the Earl of Essex using code-names, which he learned from Richard Douglas and a former secretary of the Earl of Leicester code-named "Orlando." In the code, the Earl of Essex was "Ernestus", Lord Rich "Richarddo", Lady Rich (a sister of Essex) "Rialta", James VI "Victor." Cecil noted Fowler as "Fidelis", faithful. Fowler's letters are frequently cited by historians for their significant observations of the Scottish court and the Catholic Earls. When Fowler suspected that James VI would sail to Norway to meet Anne of Denmark, Fowler was asked if he would accompany the Chancellor on the voyage, but he refused.

On 7 June 1589 Fowler attended the audiences of the English ambassador William Asheby and the English sailor George Beeston and his captains. An English sailor on shore had been killed by Spanish sailors. Fowler wrote that James VI had involved his as "his secretary" drafting requests to the Privy Council of Scotland for justice for the sailors.

At the end of October 1589 Fowler wrote a long letter to Cecil complaining about the English ambassador, William Asheby. Fowler claimed to have helped build Ashbey's connections, confidence, and influence at the Scottish court, but another English resident, Richard Wigmore, had influenced Ashby against him. He understood that Ashby had spoken against him to the king and to the Earl of Bothwell, and that his enemies were intercepting his letters. Wigmore, according to Fowler, guided Asheby like a child. He was forced to lodge in Edinburgh Castle for fear of Bothwell. Letters were taken from the messenger Robert Hudson.

== Death ==
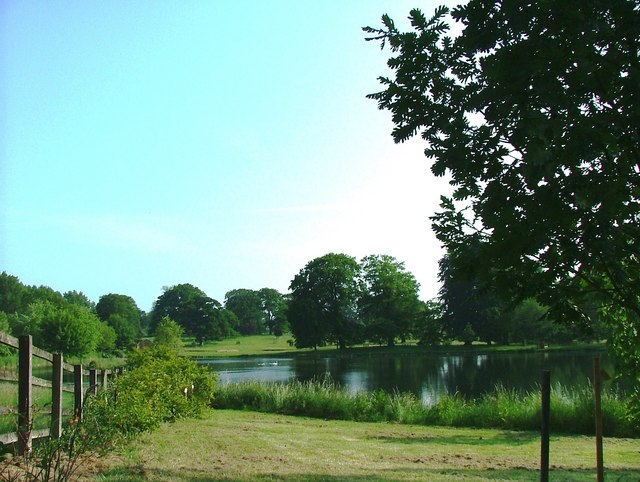
A lake at the present day Settrington House, North Yorkshire

Thomas Fowler died on 13 April 1590 in John Acheson's House in Edinburgh's Canongate, after becoming sick and speechless.

Francis Stewart, 1st Earl of Bothwell seized his possessions which included a bond of payment for £400 lent to the English courtier of James VI, Roger Aston. Bothwell claimed that Fowler was illegitimate, he was certainly intestate, and so his possessions were the property of the Scottish crown. Bothwell's right to do this was disputed on behalf of the Lord Justice Clerk, Lewis Bellenden who was in Norway with the King. Attempts were made by the English ambassador Robert Bowes to recover property which had belonged to Arbella Stuart, but James VI claimed these were legacies to him from his grandmother Margaret Douglas, Countess of Lennox.

The disputed property included a diamond cross, a tablet or locket with a diamond and a ruby and an emerald, a tablet with an agate on both sides, and a tablet with a ruby, and a ring with a fair diamond. He owed money to Thomas Foulis, Robert Jousie, David Clappan, and Roger Aston. Richard Wigmore noted that there were receipts from the Countess of Shrewsbury (Lady Talbot) for jewels received by Arbella. Wigmore said that Fowler falsely claimed have made a will at his deathbed.

Fowler's son by his first wife, William Fowler, promised to restore these jewels to Arbella when he received the rest of father's property from the king. Bowes sent William Fowler to Cecil from Edinburgh. James would give to jewels to Arbella if he saw the Countess of Lennox's will.

Fowler's second wife Elizabeth married George Blenkoe and continued to farm the manor at Settrington, which they tenanted as Fowler's legacy from the Countess of Lennox.
