= George Young (diplomat) =

Scottish churchman, courtier, diplomat and secretary depute

George Young (fl. 1584–1615) was a Scottish churchman, courtier, member of the Privy Council of Scotland, diplomat, and secretary depute.

== Career ==
George Young was appointed Archdeacon of St Andrews by James VI of Scotland on 12 October 1584.

In February 1581 he was clerk of the Privy Council, and brought writings and letters from James VI of Scotland to the English ambassador, Thomas Randolph. In April 1581 he received the royal gift of the income of the Parsonage of Carstairs.

He accompanied the ambassador Colonel William Stewart to England in April 1583.

He brought the king's instructions during the election of burgh officials in October 1584, directing the voters to select his choices, including James Stewart, Earl of Arran as Provost.

=== Ambassador ===
He was sent as an ambassador to England in 1585 with David Lindsay, and Queen Elizabeth gave them gifts of markedly small value. In January 1587, he was again in London with Sir Robert Melville, William Keith of Delny, and Alexander Stewart who were pleading for the life of Mary, Queen of Scots. According to David Moysie, on 20 February 1587, James VI sent to him to Berwick-upon-Tweed to meet an incoming English diplomat and ask if it was true that Mary, Queen of Scots had been executed. Robert Carey told him that she had been executed and Young brought the news to Edinburgh.

George Young received £666 Scots in 1588 probably to defray the expenses of the royal household. He was given twenty crowns to pay "Cuthbert" (probably Cuthbert Rayne), one of the English huntsmen that served the King.

Young was one of the diplomats sent to Denmark in 1589 in connection with the marriage of James VI of Scotland and Anne of Denmark. He received £133 Scots for his expenses. He returned on 23 July 1589 with his colleagues Andrew Keith, Lord Dingwall, and John Skene and went to the king at Boyne Castle. An English observer Thomas Fowler reported their news including the Danish opinion that James VI asked for too high a dowry, but they had seen extensive preparations for the marriage including a coach made of silver. According to their report, Anne of Denmark was keen for the marriage to go ahead, and Fowler wrote; "the young lady is so far in love with the king's majesty as it were death to her to have it broken off, and has made good proof (in) diverse ways of her affection, which his majesty is apt enough to requite".

Young also served on Border commissions in 1588, 1596, and 1598.

He was with James VI in Norway and Denmark serving as depute-secretary. Young signed the ratification of the king's marriage contract at Oslo on 21 November 1589. The other witnesses were John Maitland, the Earl Marischal, the Provost of Lincluden, Patrick Vans of Barnbarroch, Lewis Bellenden, James Scrimgeour, Alexander Lindsay, John Carmichael, William Keith of Delny, William Stewart, and John Skene.

In Copenhagen, in February 1590, Young bought books for James VI and received books presented to the king by authors and gave them rewards. He returned to Scotland on 30 April 1590. In December 1593, Young was appointed to a committee to audit the account of money spent by the Chancellor, John Maitland of Thirlestane, on the royal voyages. The funds in question came from the English subsidy and the dowry of Anne of Denmark.

=== Woman from Lübeck ===
In the summer of 1590 he became involved in the case of a woman from Lübeck because he could speak German. The woman had come to Helsingør in the spring of 1590 to see James VI but missed him. She arrived in Scotland and presented herself to the court of Anne of Denmark. She said she brought a prophecy from magicians of the east, of a great king in north-west Europe and his noble future actions, meaning James VI. The king in the prophecy had a wound or mark on the side of his body. The woman had a letter written in Latin saying she brought news of the king's good fortune. She had tried to meet James VI at Elsinore but missed seeing him there. In Edinburgh, she had an audience with Anne of Denmark, speaking in German. James VI thought she was probably a witch, but asked Young to interview her.

At first she was reluctant to speak to him, preferring to talk to a "wise man" of her own choice and see the mark on the king's body first. The English diplomat Robert Bowes heard that she had come to Scotland because of her "inordinate love" for one of the queen's servants, and so her story of a prophecy was disregarded and her "credit cracked". This probably means she was questioned by Young to see if she was a false prophet or witch, and he found her to be deranged by her love.

In June 1592, a young woman from Aberdeen, Helen Guthrie, who argued with the King over religious policy was thought to be "disquieted". She was also referred to the queen's household where she was treated humanely.

=== Administrator ===
George Young received a fee or pension of £100 Scots from William Schaw, who was Chamberlain of Dunfermline and Ettrick Forest for Anne of Denmark. In 1594 the Parliament of Scotland confirmed the king's grant of a pension of £200 from the customs of Edinburgh.

A memo written by the king for Young on 17 April 1594 outlines a variety of concerns; the problem of the Earl of Bothwell and the complicity of the English ambassador Lord Zouche; fears that Bothwell might kidnap Prince Henry; Danish support for James against England; Peter Young's mission to Denmark; Anne of Denmark's household and her lordship of Dunfermline.

In March 1595 Father James Myreton, a Jesuit priest, and brother of the Laird of Cambo, was detained at Leith by David Lindsay, and when brought to the king. He said he was sent from the Pope and Cardinal Cajetan. He brought a jewel from the Cardinal to wear on a chain that depicted the Crucifixion made of gold, crystal, and bone, which James VI gave to Anne of Denmark. Young and others were ordered to interview him for trial. The use of the boot, an instrument of torture to crush the legs was suggested. The incident was of some significance and was reported to a Danish diplomat Christian Barnekow.

In 1596 Young was secretary depute and on 20 January 1597 became part of the financial administration known as the Octavians from its eight key members.

On 19 May 1597 Young and Sir George Home of Wedderburn met the English ambassadors Robert Bowes and William Bowes in Edinburgh. The next day Young and Sir William Stewart of Traquair brought them into the garden of Holyrood Palace to meet the king.

In 1601 Young was selected to interview the goldsmith Thomas Foulis and the cloth merchant Robert Jousie who had become major financiers of the royal household.

He married Margaret Murray.

After his death in 1615, Margaret Murray married the Laird of Claverhouse. In 1618 the Privy Council wrote to her for George Young's papers, because he had drafted a patent given to the ambassador of the Estates, or Dutch Republic, Walraven III van Brederode at the time of the baptism of Prince Henry in 1594. The details of trade treaties were to be examined by Thomas Hamilton and others.
