= Andrew Keith, Lord Dingwall =

Scottish landowner, soldier, and diplomat

Andrew Keith, Lord Dingwall (died 1606) was a Scottish landowner, soldier, and diplomat.

Andrew Keith was a grandson of William Keith, 4th Earl Marischal, a son of Robert Keith, the second Commendator of Deer. He spent his early career as a soldier in the service of Sweden, as a supporter and later an official of John III of Sweden, and had been made Baron Forsholm.

== Sweden ==
In October 1571 Regent Mar provided Keith with a letter of recommendation to the King of Denmark, Frederick II, as a brave soldier.

Andrew Keith married Elisabeth Birgersdotter of Grip, a first cousin once removed of John III, in 1574. She wrote to George Keith, 5th Earl Marischal in August 1584 thanking him for the help he had given them. They had a house in Stockholm, and ran a network of intelligence agents in Sweden. In 1583 he was sent as Swedish ambassador to England to resolve a dispute about relations with Russia.

In 1584, he was back in Scotland. He was knighted and then created Lord Dingwall by James VI of Scotland. He was appointed keeper of the castle of Dingwall. He enjoyed the confidence of the politically ascendant James Stewart, Earl of Arran, who appreciated his efforts as a diplomat in Sweden and England. Arran arranged his peerage and sent him as ambassador to England in March 1584. The English ambassador in Scotland Robert Bowes the Jesuit William Holt understood that Arran and Dingwall had agreed to promote the marriage of James VI to the King of Sweden's daughter.

In March 1586, Keith wrote to James Stewart, Earl of Arran from Västerås, sending his letters with John Anstruther, a brother of the Laird of Anstruther. He discussed their "secret purpose", a plan to marry James VI to a Swedish princess, Anna Vasa of Sweden, daughter of John III of Sweden and Catherine Jagiellon, who had recently converted to Lutheranism. The plan was likely to fail because of the objections of her mother's sister the Catholic Anna Jagiellon, Queen of Poland. Dingwall thought their scheme "should be put in oblivion." Anna Vasa never married and died in 1625.

== Anna of Denmark ==
In June 1589 he went to Denmark with the Earl Marischal to negotiate the king's marriage to Anne of Denmark. He was paid £1,666-13s-4d Scots for the expense of fitting up two ships for his voyage. The Chancellor, John Maitland of Thirlestane was sceptical about their suitability and combined abilities for this mission, and said, "Marischal and the lord Dingwall ... will not both make a wise man".

In July, Dingwall and his fellow ambassadors George Young and John Skene returned to Scotland and at Boyne Castle in Banffshire they reported to James VI on the progress of the marriage negotiations. However, in Denmark the presence of Andrew Keith in the embassy, as a man in Swedish service, had caused offence. John Colville, who was at Aberdeen with the royal party, heard that the ambassadors had not seen Anne of Denmark in person. Thomas Fowler, also at Aberdeen, heard a rumour that the embassy had caused some confusion in Denmark, the marriage being considered as settled, and costly preparations in hand, including ships, jewels, clothes, and a silver coach for the bride. Circumstances that, if the marriage plan failed, could bring disgrace to the lady and the Danish council "in most parts of Europe".

James VI decided to send Dingwall back to Denmark. He was instructed to accept any Danish offer to complete the marriage. James wrote to the Earl Marischal congratulating him on his progress and asked him help Dingwall buy a jewel to give to Anne of Denmark.

James was married on 20 August 1589, the Earl Marischal was his proxy or stand-in at the ceremony in his bride's lodging and bedchamber in the palace of Kronborg. Dingwall returned from Denmark on 12 September 1589 and reported that he had seen Anna of Denmark and her fleet, commanded by the Danish admirals Peder Munk and Henrik Gyldenstierne, at the northern tip of Denmark, at Skagen. The English ambassador William Ashby heard that the queen would arrive in five days in the best of conditions, and the wind was favourable. Some accounts say that Dingwall brought news of the storm. On 10 October Steen Bille and Andrew Sinclair brought Anne of Denmark's letters of 3 October to Leith. She had decided to stay over-winter in Norway.

Dingwall was picked to travel to Norway to fetch the queen, and then was included in the king's party in Norway and Denmark. In January they travelled overland through a part of Sweden, Anne of Denmark and James VI in sledges sent by her mother Sophie of Mecklenburg-Güstrow. John III king of Sweden had sent special instructions that Andrew Keith and Axel Gyldenstierne should on no account be allowed in the fortress of Älvsborg at the mouth of the river Göta.

There was a controversy whether the queen's dowry money should be brought home untouched to Scotland, or whether the Earl Marischal, Dingwall and William Keith of Delny should be recompensed there and then. Delny, who was criticised for his ostentatious dress, was sacked from the post of Master of Wardrobe, and replaced by the rising favourite Sir George Home. Some of the Earl Marischal's expenses and Delny's outlay on the king's clothes were reimbursed from the dowry.

== Sweden again ==
Keith returned to Sweden in 1592. He resigned his lands in Scotland to William Keith of Delny. He came to Scotland in January 1598 on a diplomatic mission from the king of Poland, and James VI gave him a gold chain worth 300 crowns. He intended to enlist men for service in Sweden but according to the English courtier Roger Aston he had no money to enlist them, and people were discouraged because earlier recruits had been "cruelly slain."

Keith accompanied Sigismund III Vasa into exile after the coup in 1598 and died in Paris in 1606.
