= Abbot of Deer =

The Abbot of Deer (later Commendator of Deer), was the head of the Cistercian monastic community of Deer Abbey in Buchan. It was founded in 1219 by William Comyn, jure uxoris Earl of Buchan. There was an earlier community of Scottish monks or priests which was probably absorbed by the new foundation (see Deer Abbey). It was turned into a secular lordship for Commendator Robert Keith II (becoming Lord Altrie) in 1587. The following is a list of known abbots and commendators:

== List of abbots ==
- Robert, 1219-1220
- Alexander, 1220-1222
- Herbert, 1224
- Walran, 1224 x 1226-1234
- Hugh, 1234-1235
- Robert, 1235-1252
- Henry, 1252-1262
- Adam de Smalham, ? 1262-1267
- Hugh, 1267
- Richard, x 1289
- Brice, 1296
- Michael, 1316-1327x1328
- John, 1338 x 1346
- Robert, 1355 x 1366
- Thomas, 1395-1406 x c.1416
- Robert Crokat, c.1416-1423
- Arthur de Calamo, 1428-1435 [1439]
- David Cran, 1430-1435
- Andrew Symonis, 1435-1439
- Nicholas de Forres, 1439-1457
- Patrick Mador, 1441
- William Ernot, 1457-1477 x 1483
- David Bane, 1458-1460
- Nicholas Sharp, 1482
- Thomas Bett, 1483
- James Pethindreich, 1483-1507 x 1510
- Nicholas Flaigi, 1505
- John Innes, 1509-1543

=== List of commendators ===
- Robert Keith I, 1543-1550
- Robert Keith II, 1552-1587

== Bibliography ==
- Cowan, Ian B. & Easson, David E., Medieval Religious Houses: Scotland With an Appendix on the Houses in the Isle of Man, Second Edition, (London, 1976), p. 47
- Watt, D.E.R. & Shead, N.F. (eds.), The Heads of Religious Houses in Scotland from the 12th to the 16th Centuries, The Scottish Records Society, New Series, Volume 24, (Edinburgh, 2001), pp. 54–8

== See also ==
- Deer Abbey
- Lord Altrie
