= Robert Douglas, Provost of Lincluden =

Scottish landowner, courtier and administrator

Robert Douglas, Provost of Lincluden (died 1609) was a Scottish landowner, courtier, and administrator.

He was a son of Sir James Douglas of Drumlanrig (d. 1578).

He was appointed Provost of Lincluden in September 1547.

In the summer of 1584 he was warded a prisoner in Falkland Palace. James Stewart, Earl of Arran placed George Drummond of Blair with him as an informer. Drummond said that Douglas was an enemy of Arran and in touch with the exiled lords in England.

David Hume of Godscroft wrote that Lincluden was an advisor of John Maitland of Thirlestane around 1585. At this time he was made Collector-General and Treasurer of the New Augmentations.

He went with James VI of Scotland to Norway to meet Anne of Denmark. James Melville of Halhill mentions that Douglas did not sail in the king's ship, but in one of three other ships, along with Lewis Bellenden, John Carmichael, William Keith of Delny, George Home, James Sandilands and Peter Young.

Douglas signed the ratification of the king's marriage contract at Oslo on 21 November 1589. The other witnesses were John Maitland, the Earl Marischal, Patrick Vans of Barnbarroch, Lewis Bellenden, James Scrimgeour, Alexander Lindsay, John Carmichael, William Keith of Delny, William Stewart, John Skene, and George Young.

He wrote from Helsingør to Sir Patrick Vans of Barnbarroch on 3 April 1590 about the plans for the king's return, to sail on 14 April, "wind and weather serving." He mentioned a factional struggle among the royal retinue involving William Keith of Delny, who would lose his office as keeper of the royal wardrobe.

He arrived back in Scotland on 30 April 1590.

In September and October 1592 he hosted the Chancellor John Maitland and his wife Jean Fleming, Countess of Cassilis at Greenlaw.

He made a will at the house called Frieris by Kelso on 12 September 1609.

He died in 1609.
