= Sir John Carmichael =

Scottish soldier (died 1600)

Sir John Carmichael (died 16 June 1600) was a Scottish soldier, the Keeper of Liddesdale, a diplomat, and owner of Fenton Tower at Kingston, East Lothian.

== Career ==
He was the son of John Carmichael and Elizabeth Somerville, a daughter of Hugh Somerville, 5th Lord Somerville. The estate and village of Carmichael is in South Lanarkshire.

He was active in the Marian Civil War, and in September 1571 the Earl of Morton wrote approvingly of an incident where he had chased and fought some horsemen of Queen Mary's side near Edinburgh.

He was appointed warden of the Scottish West March.

In 1573 Regent Morton went to Jedburgh to hold justice courts, and he sent Carmichael to arrest Black James Ormiston for his involvement in the murder of Lord Darnley. In 1574 Carmichael was recommended for a pension from England, given to those of power and influence who could support English interests in Scotland. He was said to be "a favourer of the amity, a good executioner, and in favour with the Regent."

=== Raid of the Redeswire ===
Carmichael fought against the English at the Raid of the Redeswire on 7 July 1575 on a day of border truce, and captured Sir John Forster, the English Warden and commander, after an argument turned to violence. At the start of the fighting two Scottish men, Symonton and Robson were killed, and Carmichael was hit by a bullet but unharmed. Other witnesses claimed two Northumbrians, Fenwick and Robert Shafton were the first casualties. Francis Walsingham asked Henry Killigrew to ask the ruler of Scotland, Regent Morton to have Carmichael arrested. Forster and his companions were entertained with some expense at Dalkeith Palace, and sent home. Carmichael was taken to Berwick to be lodged with the President of the Council of the North, the Earl of Huntingdon, at York.

In 1580 he was one of the 25 gentlemen pensioners appointed to attend James VI when he went riding. Other members of this entourage included, Captain James Stewart, Captain Crawford, Walter Stewart of Blantyre, the Master of Cathcart, James Anstruther, Roger Aston, Patrick Hume of Polwarth, and John Stewart of Baldynneis.

In September 1587 James VI sent him to ask Edinburgh council for a loan of 100 gold crowns to buy velvet saddles to give to the French poet and diplomat Guillaume de Salluste Du Bartas. On 8 July 1588 he collected £2,000 of the subsidy or annuity money that Elizabeth gave to James VI at Hutton Hall near Berwick-upon-Tweed, and £3,000 on 9 September from Robert Bowes at Cawmills.

=== Huntly and Holyroodhouse ===
In August 1588 a party of soldiers and sailors from the Spanish Armada came ashore and met up with Colonel William Sempill. The Edinburgh authorities arrested them, and Colonel Sempill rode towards Crichton Castle. Carmichael gave chase and caught him, and brought him back to Holyrood House. James VI ordered that Sempill should be imprisoned in Robert Gourlay's house. The Earl of Huntly tried to prevent this, and helped Colonel Sempill escape.

According to David Hume of Godscroft, the Earl of Angus and Lord John Hamilton argued over precedence in the king's privy or outer chamber at Holyrood Palace. James VI came out of his bed chamber and made them reconcile. Meanwhile Carmichael had made the palace secure, and Angus had to signal to his followers, who were preparing to break in, from a window that all was well. Godscroft mentions that Carmichael was an ally and dependent of the Douglas family.

Carmichael was made Warden of West March and Steward of Annandale in place of the forfeited John, Lord Maxwell, in September 1588.

In May 1589 the Earl of Huntly surrendered to Carmichael and Captain William Home at Terrisoul near Aberdeen, who brought him to Edinburgh to be warded in Robert Gourlay's house.

=== Royal marriage ===
Carmichael sailed to Norway and Denmark with James VI of Scotland in 1589. James VI wrote from Leith on 22 October to Queen Elizabeth and the English border warden Lord Scrope mentioning that Carmichael was with him. James Melville of Halhill mentions that Carmichael did not sail in the king's ship, but in one of three other ships, along with Lewis Bellenden, the Provost of Lincluden, William Keith of Delny, George Home, James Sandilands and Peter Young.

On 1 January 1590 he presented Henrik Gyldenstierne, Captain of Bohus Castle, with a ring and a gold chain, for which James VI reimbursed him 3,000 Danish dalers. Carmichael returned to Scotland on 15 April 1590 with instructions for the welcoming party at Leith for Anne of Denmark.

James VI sent orders that Carmichael should raise a company of 200 soldiers to attend their landing, and restrain those trying to meet him at Leith, including "nobility and ladies". This was disappointing news which led to fears amongst the Scottish aristocracy that the "order used in Denmark", where noble titles were not used, might prejudice their ancient rights of access to the royals. Carmichael also carried a letter from Colonel William Stewart to the English diplomat in Edinburgh, Robert Bowes, and another letter to Bowes with a verbal message from the Chancellor, John Maitland of Thirlestane. He was knighted at the coronation of Anne of Denmark on 17 May 1590.

=== England ===
He was sent as ambassador to England with Colonel William Stewart in June 1590, and was instructed to tell Elizabeth about the journey of James VI to marry Anne of Denmark. He was also to renew requests made by the Justice Clerk, Lewis Bellenden for money to help James VI govern Scotland, to maintain an armed guard, and fund an embassy to Germany. William Cecil gave him £500, which he passed to the Colonel and John Skene for use in their embassy to Germany. He had an audience with Elizabeth I on 19 June.

On 2 July 1590 he was given £3,000 Sterling, or £27,000 Scots, for James VI as part of an occasional subsidy or annuity. Carmichael delivered the money to the Chancellor, John Maitland of Thirlestane, keeping £277 Scots for his expenses and was given a further £3,780 by the king's order, for the guard. From the remainder James VI gave money to a courtier Sir James Sandilands for household expenses, to Robert Jousie for textiles for court costume, to William Schaw for building work, bought gifts for the French ambassadors François de Civille and Jean Hotman, and paid for the banquet, sugar confections, and gold chains given to Danish ambassadors at his homecoming.

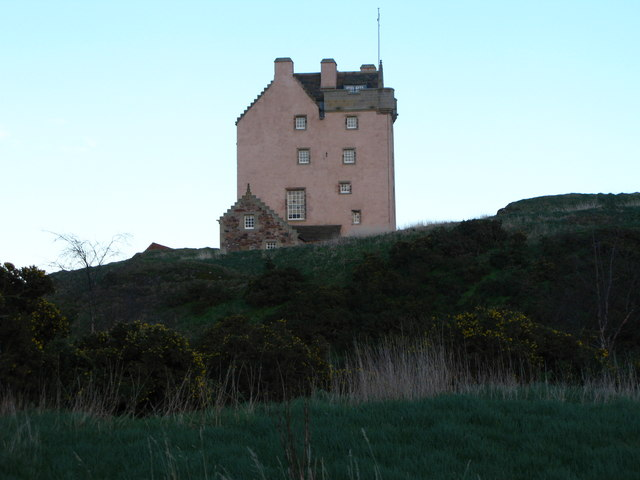
Fenton Tower in East Lothian

=== Glasgow and Fenton ===
The king sent Carmichael and William Stewart of Blantyre to Glasgow to arrest Brian O'Rourke, a rebel to Queen Elizabeth, and take him to England on 3 April 1591. This caused a riot in Glasgow, because the arrest was thought likely to damage the Irish trade, and they were cursed as "Queen Elizabeth's knights" and the king for taking "English angels", the annuity or subsidy received from Queen Elizabeth. Carmichael took O'Rourke to his own house on the way to Carlisle. Carmichael and Blantyre hoped Elizabeth might spare O'Rourke so the inhabitants of Glasgow would be reconciled to them, but he was executed.

Carmichael built Fenton Tower in East Lothian, but there was a claim to the title of the lands by Hamilton of Innerwick in February 1591. The English ambassador Robert Bowes spoke to James VI in Carmichael's favour saying that Queen Elizabeth would like to see him rewarded. James VI visited several times, and in May 1592 stayed with Anna of Denmark attended by his English servant Roger Aston, and had a meeting with the Earl of Mar.

In December 1592 he rode with Sir George Home with news of the crisis caused by the discovery of the Spanish blanks to Alloa Tower, where James VI and Anna of Denmark were celebrating the wedding of the Earl of Mar and Marie Stewart.

=== Bothwell's rebellion ===
Francis Stewart, 5th Earl of Bothwell attacked Falkland Palace on 27 June 1592, with a force including men from the borders, both English and Scottish. James Sandilands captured nine or ten men, mostly of the Armstrong surname, on Bothwellmure. Five were executed, but the others were spared at the request of John Carmichael because they were not habitual border reivers.

Lord John Hamilton captured Archibald Wauchope of Niddrie with other rebel followers of the Earl of Bothwell at the meadow of Lesmahagow on 1 July 1592 and imprisoned them in Craignethan Castle. James VI sent Carmichael to collect the prisoners, but one of Hamilton's sons released them. In September 1592 he escorted Captain James Halkerston and John Hamilton of Airdrie to Dalkeith Palace where they were interrogated and threatened with the boot, a device to crush their legs. By now Carmichael's sight was failing, in one eye due to old age, and in the other a film was forming, and it was thought he would retire from court and the royal guard. His depute-warden was John Johnstone, Laird of Newbie.

=== Murder ===
He was murdered by members of Clan Armstrong on 16 June 1600 who ambushed him as he rode to Langholm to attend a warden court.

According to a chronicle, he was shot by the family of Alexander Armstrong alias Sandy Ringan, a brother of Kinmont Willie. Sandy Ringan had met with Carmichael as warden, and was disappointed by their discussion, and insulted by a practical joke when eggs were put in his scabbard, to glue his sword so it could not be drawn. Alexander Armstrong and his friends were caught and hanged.

After the murder, James VI told the English diplomat in Edinburgh George Nicholson that Carmichael had been a "better Englishman than a Scotsman," meaning that he had shown partiality to England on the border. James VI told Anne of Denmark about the murder who, according to Nicholson, said she did not expect him to come to a better end, as a plotter against Mary, Queen of Scots.

In March 1602 James VI came in person to Boneshaw and sent his men to demolish the house of Rynion or Ninian Armstrong. In July men said be Carmichael's murderers joined with some Englishmen to burn houses belonging to Johnstone family. Three Johnstones were killed. Alexander Armstrong was executed for the murder at Dumfries in April 1605 after being held a prisoner in Carlisle Castle.

== Marriage and family ==
Carmichael is said to have married a daughter of Archibald Douglas of Glenbervie and Elizabeth Irvine, Katherine or Sara Douglas. They had no children.

Carmichael married Margaret Douglas, a daughter of George Douglas of Pittendreich and sister to Regent Morton. Their children included;

- Hugh Carmichael of that Ilk, who was Master of Horse to James VI in 1593, went to London in May 1597, and was ambassador to Denmark. He married Sybilla Baillie. Their son John Carmichael was the last of this line, and the Carmichael estates went to a distant cousin James Carmichael, who had impressed James VI and I with his skill at court in a jumping competition.
- Maria Carmichael (died 9 May 1626), who was a gentlewoman in the household of Anne of Denmark. She married John Bothwell, Lord Holyroodhouse.
- Abigail Carmichael, who married (1) Hugh Weir of Clowburn, Lanarkshire, (2) Thomas Hay of Scrogis.
- Anne Carmichael, who married Walter Whitford, Bishop of Brechin.
- Elizabeth Carmichael.
- James Carmichael. On 22 December 1596 he killed Stephen Bruntfield, Captain of Tantallon, in a duel. Eventually he was made to fight Adam Bruntfield in single combat on Cramond Island, or on the "Links of Barnbougle", on 15 March 1597. The judges were the Duke of Lennox, the Laird of Buccleuch, and Sir James Sandilands. They wore lightweight clothes of satin and taffeta, one in blue, and one in red. Bruntfield killed Carmichael, according to some accounts in front of 5,000 spectators.
