= George Home, 1st Earl of Dunbar =

Influential 17th-century Scotsman

The Right Honourable The Earl of Dunbar KG PC
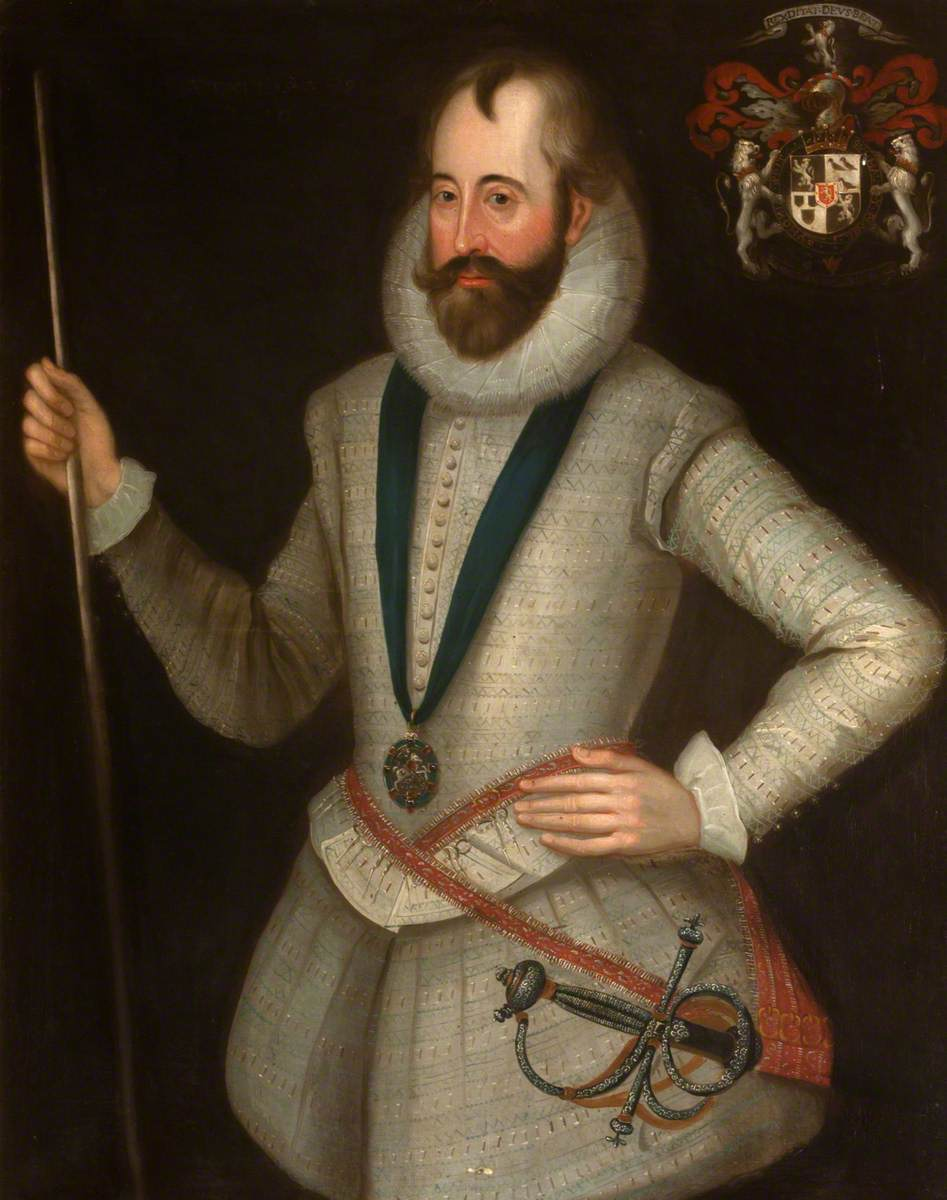

Chancellor of the Exchequer
- In office 1603–1606
- Preceded by: John Fortescue
- Succeeded by: Sir Julius Caesar

Personal details
- Born: 1556
- Died: 20 January 1611 (aged 54-55)

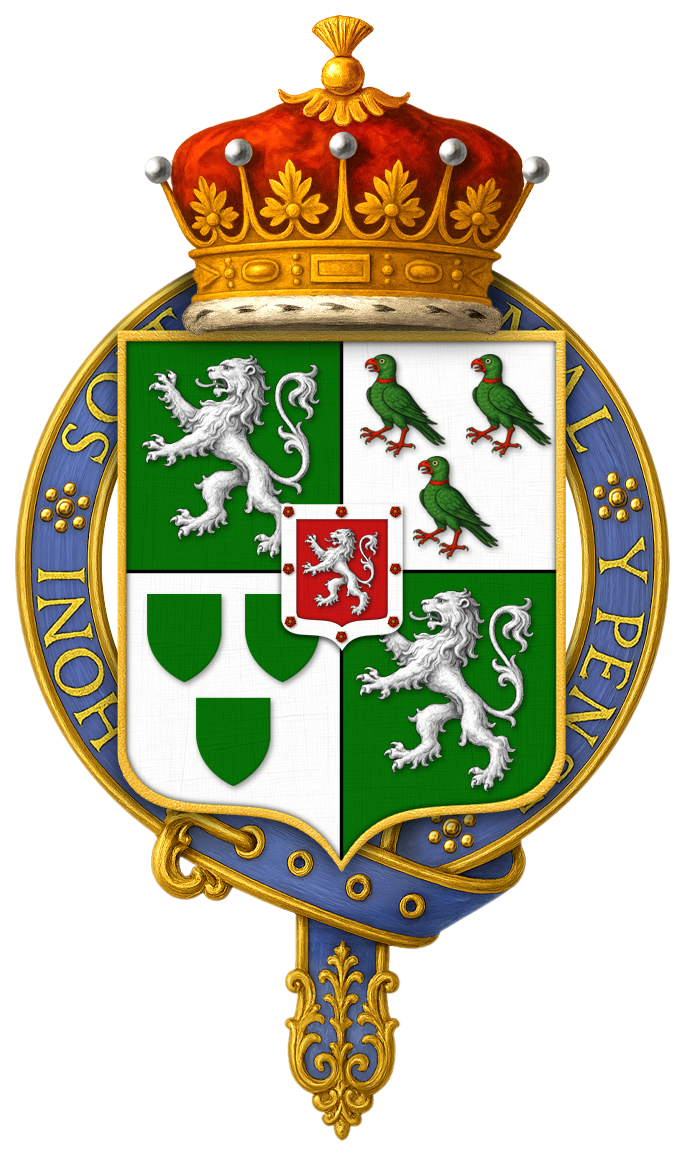
Quartered arms Sir George Home, 1st Earl of Dunbar, KG (Quarterly 1st and 4th Vert a lion rampant Argent for Hume; 2nd Argent three popinjays Vert beaked and membered Gules for Pepdie; 3rd Argent three escutcheons Vert; an inescutcheon of pretence Gules a lion rampant Argent on a border also Argent eight roses Gules)

George Home, 1st Earl of Dunbar (ca. 1556 – 20 January 1611) was, in the last decade of his life, the most prominent and most influential Scotsman in England. His work lay in the King's Household and in the control of the State Affairs of Scotland and he was the King's chief Scottish advisor. With the full backing and trust of King James he travelled regularly from London to Edinburgh via Berwick-upon-Tweed.

== In Scotland ==
Home was the third son of Sir Alexander Home of Manderston, Berwickshire, by his spouse Janet, daughter of George Home of Spott. He was introduced, at the age of 26, to the Court of sixteen-year-old James VI by a relative, Alexander Home, 6th Lord Home. Establishing himself as a favourite, he was in the retinue which accompanied King James VI to Norway and Denmark to collect his future Queen. James Melville of Halhill mentions that Home did not sail with the king, but in one of three other ships, along with Lewis Bellenden, John Carmichael, the Provost of Lincluden, William Keith of Delny, James Sandilands, and Peter Young.

During the trip, James VI made him Keeper of the Royal Wardrobe and sacked William Keith of Delny, who had appeared in richer clothing than himself. In 1606, when making him Earl of Dunbar, James VI praised him for his tact and diplomacy in Denmark at this time, his "high prudence and rare discretion."

He was knighted on 4 November 1590, when Alexander Lindsay was made Lord Spynie, and known as "Sir George Home of Primrose Knowe", and after 1593, as "Sir George Home of Spot". Spott is a village in East Lothian. Home had a feud with the previous owner James Douglas, who was drawn into the plots of the Earl of Bothwell and declared a rebel and traitor. James VI gave Home the rest of the lands of Spott and made them barony for Sir George Hume on 10 June 1592, requesting that Spott castle be the chief residence of the baron, and a feudal duty of a primrose to be delivered at Primroseknowe every 25 March.

In the 1590s Home presided over an arrangement where clothes and textiles for the royal households were provided by the goldsmith Thomas Foulis and merchant Robert Jousie, partly financed by money sent as a gift or subsidy to James VI by Queen Elizabeth. Home had a role in financing the household of Anne of Denmark giving her £3833 Scots in 1591, and in 1592 a dividend of £4000 from her dowry which had been invested in various Scottish towns. He was in charge of paying her Danish servants who were owed fees by the Scottish exchequer, totalling £1,200 in 1592.

In November 1592 Home was identified with friends of the Duke of Lennox, Colonel William Stewart, the Laird of Dunipace, Thomas Erskine, and James Sandilands, as a supporter of the king's former favourite James Stewart, Earl of Arran, working for his rehabilitation to the disadvantage of the Chancellor, John Maitland and the Hamilton family. The English diplomat Robert Bowes called this group the "four young and counselling courtiers."

In December 1592 he rode with Sir John Carmichael with news of the crisis caused by the discovery of the Spanish blanks to Alloa Tower, where James VI and Anna of Denmark were celebrating the wedding of the Earl of Mar and Marie Stewart.

In November 1593 Anna of Denmark complained that people around the king were speaking disrespectfully of her. James asked Home to be watchful of the queen's honour. Robert Bowes wrote that Home himself was suspected of speaking against the queen, and Burghley endorsed this, adding "The wolf to be a watchman."

Home was involved in the preparations for the baptism of Prince Henry at Stirling Castle in 1594. He was given £4,000 Scots from the queen's dowry which had been invested with Perth town council. The money was for mending the royal tapestries, making tablecloths for the banquets and the desks in the chapel, and upholstering stools and chairs. Some new textiles were provided by an English merchant Baptist Hicks. The tapestries were repaired by George Strachan or Strathauchin and William Beaton, the court embroiderer, made the other items. During the ceremony, Home, as Master of the Wardrobe, stood with the Captain of the Guard near the King's seat on a stage in the upper part of the Chapel Royal.

Home was active in the campaigns against Francis Stewart, 5th Earl of Bothwell. In February 1595 his brother William Home was in arms against Bothwell's supporters, killing John Noutt in Dunfermline and capturing men in Kelso.

With the king, at Linlithgow Palace, he interviewed a woman from Nokwalter in Perth, Christian Stewart, who was accused of causing the death of Patrick Ruthven by witchcraft. She confessed she had obtained a cloth from Isobel Stewart to bewitch Patrick Ruthven. She was found guilty of witchcraft and burnt on Edinburgh's Castlehill in November 1596. In 1598 he was appointed a Privy Counsellor, and the following year appears as Sheriff of Berwick-upon-Tweed, (by then in England).

In October 1600 James VI visited his house at Spott and was banqueted. The "merry" party included Sir Robert Ker, the Duke of Lennox, Sir Thomas Erskine, and Sir David Murray. The English courtier Roger Aston noted that all the gentlemen of the chamber there were "inward" with one another and with Home, who was the most "inward" with the king. Aston took the opportunity to ride to Berwick-upon-Tweed to see his friends.

In 1601 he was made Master of the King's Wardrobe, and on 31 July the same year was appointed one of the Componitors to the Lord High Treasurer, and acceded to that position in September. In 1601 he was also made Provost of Dunbar.

== In England ==
Upon James's accession as James I of England in 1603, Home accompanied his sovereign to Westminster, where he became Chancellor of the Exchequer from 1603 to 1606.

In 1603, he was also appointed to the Privy Council of England, and on 1 June that year received a grant as Keeper of the Great Wardrobe for life. In July the king asked the Chancellor John Fortescue to move out of his house so Home could live there. The French ambassador the Marquis de Rosny identified Erskine as an influential courtier, and gave him a panache or feather jewel set with diamonds and featuring a fair ruby in the centre.

On 7 July 1604, he was created Baron Hume of Berwick in the Peerage of England. In 1605 he was appointed a Knight of the Garter, and, on 3 July, was created Earl of Dunbar in the Peerage of Scotland. There is evidence that he took a part in the interrogation of Guy Fawkes in the immediate aftermath of the Gunpowder Plot of 1605.

King James granted him the patent for dying cloth with imported tropical dyewoods. The use of these dyes was restricted due to concerns over quality. Dunbar paid £500 a year for the patent, and was able to issue licences to dyers. In 1607 a new process was thought to improve the quality, the restrictions were lifted, and the Earl was paid compensation.

The Venetian ambassador Nicolò Molin described Dunbar in unflattering terms in 1607. He wrote that Dunbar was a weak and ungrateful character who made few friends, and no one could understand why he received the king's favour. He thought that Dunbar contributed to the power held by the Earl of Salisbury.

In June 1608 Dunbar and the Earl of Montgomery went in procession from London to Windsor Castle for their investiture. The royal family watched the procession from Cecil House on the Strand. The Venetian ambassador Zorzi Giustinian noted that the English courtiers were jealous of the honours awarded to Scots. Dunbar went hunting with the King at Havering in 1608.

In October 1609 Dunbar, who was on his way to Scotland, gave King James a book of advice and counsel that his mother Mary, Queen of Scots had written for him. The manuscript was found in the Earl of Gowrie's house in Perth. Roger Aston reported that the king was "right glad of it".

=== Queen Elizabeth's jewels and clothes ===
Home was made keeper of the royal great wardrobe on 1 June 1603, and he is particularly associated with dispersal of Queen Elizabeth's costume and jewellery. John Chamberlain wrote that Elizabeth left, "a well stored jewel house and a rich wardrobe of more than 2000 gowns with all things else answerable". In June 1603, Scaramelli, a Venetian diplomat, wrote that Anne of Denmark had given away jewels, costume, and hangings to her ladies remaining in Scotland, and would find six thousand gowns in Elizabeth's wardrobe which were being adjusted for her. Anne would discard her Scottish identity for an English persona. As King James travelled south to London in April 1603 he ordered that some of Elizabeth's jewels, and a hairdresser Blanche Swansted, should be sent to Berwick-upon-Tweed so that Anne of Denmark would appear like an English queen as she crossed the border. James reiterated this request, explaining these jewels were to be selected by Elizabeth's household attendants for Anne's "ordinary apparelling and ornament". Anne may have been dressed in Elizabeth's clothes, the accounts reveal that her own gowns were altered and enlarged, perhaps to wear with larger farthingales.

However, according to the Venetian ambassador, Antonio Foscarini, King James gave away the queen's wardrobe, richly embroidered with pearls and gold, to a Scottish lord (meaning George Home), and disposed of many of Elizabeth's jewels. Pietro Contarini wrote a similar report or relazione in 1618, that King James had given away her jewels on one day and a few days later given away her costume and household goods. James was said to given the jewels to members of his Scottish retinue or English noble courtiers.

Records show that King James disposed of much of Queen Elizabeth's jewellery, either by selling it, having it remade, or exchanging it for new pieces. Several jewels were dismantled to provide gems for the circlet used at Anne of Denmark's English coronation. George Home was involved in examining the old queen's jewels which were brought to Hampton Court at Christmas time 1603 by Sir Thomas Knyvett. The King, Home, Roger Aston and the Earl of Nottingham selected pieces for disposal and sent them to the goldsmiths John Spilman and William Herrick, including a remarkable clock in the form of glass woman studded with rubies emeralds and pearls. Other pieces were sent to Peter Vanlore in exchange for a new jewel including a large rectangular ruby and two lozenge diamonds. Spilman and Herrick also valued jewels that had been kept by Mary Radcliffe for the queen's immediate use.

Marginal notes added to an old inventory of Elizabeth's clothes and jewels indicate items that Sir George Home delivered for the king's use, including a diamond studded pelican and a jewel like a mount with six rows of diamonds. An inventory of 22 March 1605 mentions items in his keeping for the king's use, or recently returned to the Secret Jewelhouse of the Tower of London, including, two sets of ten diamond buttons worn by King James, 29 other diamond buttons, and a gold feather jewel set with a large diamond and 25 other diamonds. King James from time to time asked Dunbar and Robert Cecil and the Lord Treasurer to select jewels, apparently from the royal wardrobe or Jewel House, as gifts from him to Anne of Denmark.

In July 1606 the earl's office of keeper of the wardrobe in Scotland was given to Sir James Hay, then a gentleman of the king's bedchamber. Dunbar was receipted for jewels held in the Tower of London and elsewhere, including; the ruby and chain from the (dismantled) pendant called the "Great H of Scotland", a hat badge with the monogram "J.A.R" in diamonds with three pendant pearls, a gold ring with five diamonds and clasped hands called the "espousal ring of Denmark", a band for hat with 23 links including six pieces with letters made of diamonds, and a diamond cross, which had been brought from Scotland for their value and significance.

Sir Charles Stanhope recorded an anecdote that Dunbar had made £60,000 from sales of clothes from the wardrobe of Queen Elizabeth I of England, and spent £20,000 on the house he built on the site of Berwick Castle. A similar story was recorded by Symonds D'Ewes on 21 January 1620, that King James had given the late queen's wardrobe to the Earl of Dunbar, who had exported it to the Low Countries and sold it for £100,000. Anne of Denmark retained a collection of the gowns and garments of previous queens of England, which was sold on her death in 1619.

== Landed interests ==
On 27 September 1603 Home received the manor and castle of Norham, with its fishing rights on the River Tweed. On 12 December a Royal Charter gave him the custody and captaincy of St Andrews Castle. In July 1605 he had a confirmation of all the lands previously granted to him incorporated and combined into a free earldom, Lordship of Parliament, and Barony of Dunbar.

=== Mansion at Berwick ===
George Home began to build a house on the site of Berwick Castle. The master of royal building work in Scotland, James Murray of Kilbaberton was involved in the construction. It was never finished but was widely rumoured to be magnificent. George Chaworth wrote to the Earl of Shrewsbury in 1607 about the various reports of its size, height, views, and good proportions and that its long gallery would make that at Worksop Manor look like a garret or attic. Worksop had been built by Shrewsbury's father.

According to William Brereton, who visited Berwick in 1633, the building work ended at the Earl's death in 1611. A stately "platform" was begun, and a long gallery with a large mantlepiece (5 yards long) had a flat roof to view the landscape. According to William Bowyer, a Scottish architect James Murray was

== Religious affairs ==
In July 1605 some nineteen ministers assembled at Aberdeen in defiance of the King's prohibition against the General Assembly meeting. Six of them were subsequently imprisoned in Blackness Castle near Linlithgow, and there, on 10 January 1606, the Earl of Dunbar came from London to be present at their trial and to act as the assessor. Everything was done that could be done by him to win a verdict for the King against the six ministers and it is said that he "brought plenty of money with him to purchase a verdict". In addition, the Earl himself selected the 15 jurymen, five of whom were Homes, his relatives. But even then the jury could not agree. In the end it was a majority verdict of nine against six in favour of the guilty verdict. Regardless of the irregularities, the verdict stood, and established the law that it was High Treason for any minister of the Established Church to dispute the authority of the King and the Privy Council in religious matters.

In 1608, Home journeyed to Scotland with George Abbot to arrange to promote the Episcopal Church, and to seek some sort of union between the Church of England and Church of Scotland. King James was pleased with the initial results, although the hoped-for Union never occurred and the gulf between the King and the General Assembly of the Church of Scotland widened.

== Marriage and family ==
In 1590 he married Elizabeth Gordon, daughter of Alexander Gordon of Schivas and Gight, and Agnes Beaton (died 1602), a daughter of Cardinal David Beaton, Archbishop of St. Andrews, and Marion Ogilvy.

The English ambassador Robert Bowes commented on Elizabeth Gordon's arrival at court in June 1590. Bowes said she was the heiress of Gight, and her mother, Agnes Beaton, by now Lady Auchindoun, had brought her to court and that George Home was likely to marry her. She became a lady in waiting to Anne of Denmark. James VI and Anna of Denmark bought her an elaborate purple velvet gown with satin sleeves and skirt in November 1590, perhaps for her marriage. Auchindoun Castle came into George Home's ownership in March 1593.

Their children were:

- Anne Home (d. 1621), who married Sir James Home of Whitrig (d. between 1614 and 1620) in 1602. Their son became James Home, 3rd Earl of Home.
- Elizabeth Home (d. 1633), according to a memoir of the early life of Princess Elizabeth, the daughter of King James and Anne of Denmark, she was one of her companions at Coombe Abbey from 1604. She married Theophilus Howard, 2nd Earl of Suffolk in 1612.
- A son who died in 1604.

== Death ==
The Earl of Dunbar died in Whitehall, London, in 1611, without male issue, whereupon the earldom and the barony became dormant.

His body was embalmed, but his funeral service did not take place in Westminster until April, after which his body was placed in a lead coffin and sent to Scotland where it was buried under the floor of Dunbar parish church, midway between the font and the pulpit. A magnificent monument, said to be finer than any in Westminster Abbey, was erected in his honour, which is still the distinguishing feature of the interior of this church.

In May 1612, his daughter Anna Home complained to the Privy Council that during negotiations for her sister's marriage to Lord Walden, The Earl of Suffolk had obtained her father's property while she remained liable for his debts.

The earl's daughter, Elizabeth, Countess of Suffolk, wrote to King Charles in 1627 pleading for her husband's position, after their imprisonment in the Tower of London, mentioning her father's long court service. Suffolk had spent £20,000 following the court, running at tilts and on masques to gain royal favour.

== See also ==
- Holy Jesus Hospital
- Drawing of Berwick Castle, showing remaining tower of the Earl of Dunbar's house, British Museum

Political offices
Preceded by John Fortescue	Chancellor of the Exchequer; 1603–1606	Succeeded by Sir Julius Caesar
Vacant Title last held by The 3rd Earl of Cumberland	Lord Lieutenant of Cumberland, Northumberland, and Westmorland jointly with The 4th Earl of Cumberland; The Earl of Suffolk; Lord de Clifford; 1607–1611	Succeeded by The 4th Earl of Cumberland; The Earl of Suffolk; Lord de Clifford
