= Helen Guthrie =

Scottish petitioner (fl. 1592)

Helen Guthrie (fl. 1592) was a Scottish petitioner.

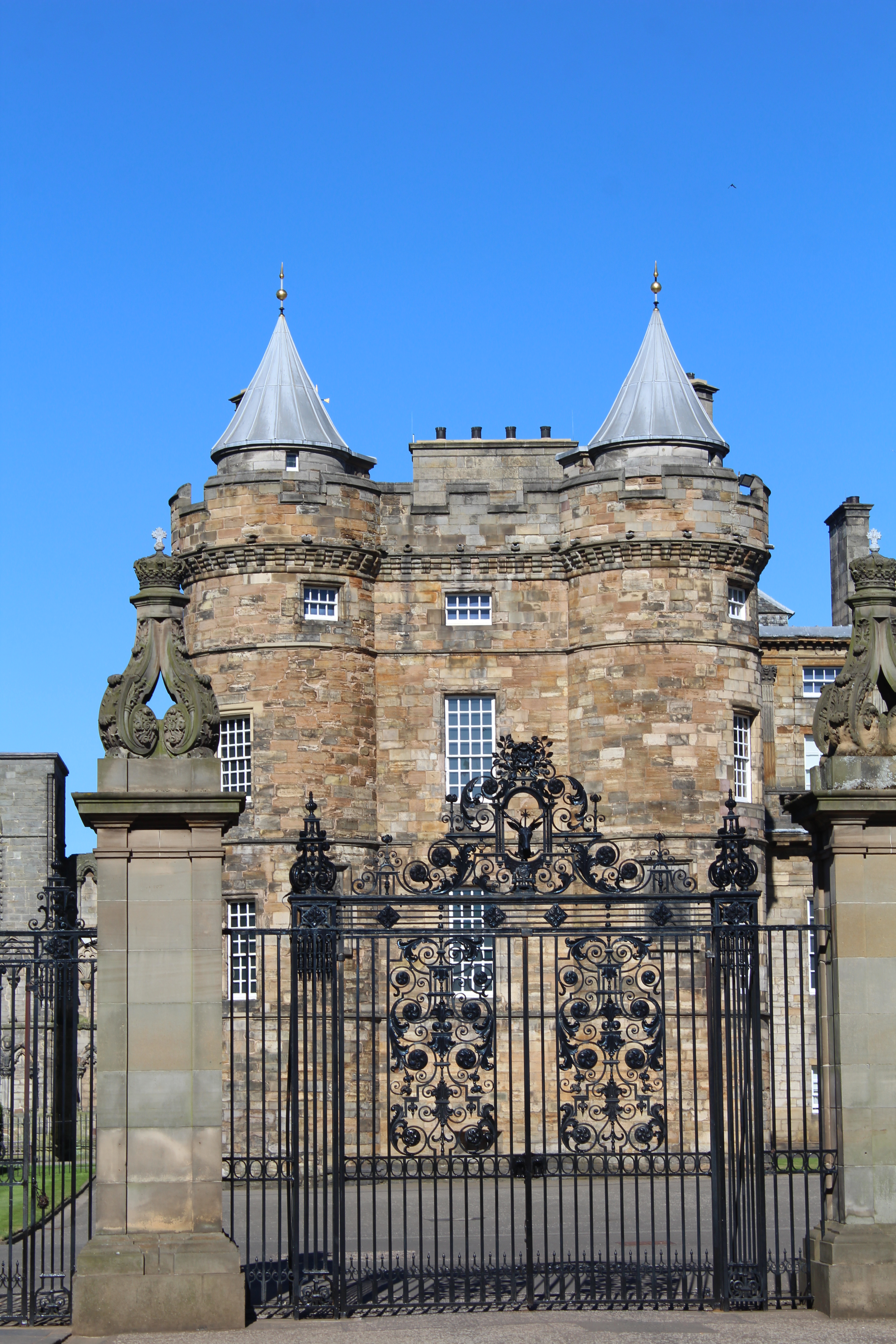
Helen Guthrie came to Holyrood Palace to tell James VI and I there would be trouble if he did not mend his ways

== Background ==
Helen Guthrie was the daughter of an Aberdeen saddle maker, John Guthrie. She is known for approaching James VI of Scotland in June 1592 and arguing with him that he should reform his rule and actions according to Presbyterian values.

== Helen Guthrie's petition ==
Guthrie approached the King in Edinburgh as he was about to set out hunting with his dogs. She seems to have made a speech and presented a written text, asking James VI to refrain from swearing and properly honour the Sabbath. It was not unusual for an ordinary subject in Scotland to approach the King in such a way. James is said to have laughed and sworn at her and asked if she was a prophetess. Helen described herself as a "simple servant of God". He sent her to his wife Anne of Denmark who treated her more kindly.

The details of her meeting the king were collected by the historian David Calderwood and the text of her petition or admonition was preserved in a collection known as the Warrender Papers. The Warrender copy says that she was 18 years old. Calderwood felt her mind was "disquieted". Recent historians including Maureen Meikle note that the admonition is carefully composed. The exact date of the incident is unknown, at the end of June 1592 James VI and Anne of Denmark were at Falkland Palace, and were briefly besieged by the Earl of Bothwell, before returning to Holyrood.

== Other female petitioners ==
James VI and Anne of Denmark had previously encountered a woman from Lübeck who claimed to bring a prophecy for the king in 1590. She was interviewed by a secretary at court, George Young.
