= Lewis Bellenden =

Scottish lawyer and Lord Justice Clerk

Sir Lewis Bellenden of Auchnole and Broughton (c. 1552 – 27 August 1591) was a Scottish lawyer, who succeeded his father as Lord Justice Clerk on 15 March 1577.

== Family background ==
He was the eldest son of Sir John Bellenden of Auchnole & Broughton and Barbara Kennedy, a daughter of Hugh Kennedy of Girvanmains.

== Career ==
He was knighted about 1577 and became the Justice Clerk. On 1 July 1584 he was promoted as a Lord Ordinary as a Senator of the College of Justice, in place of Sir Richard Maitland of Lethington.

He was not averse to the conspiracies of the period and was one of the conspirators involved in the notorious Raid of Ruthven, and Godscroft represents him as extremely violent on the occasion. Sir Lewis does not seem, however, to have shared in the ruin which attended his co-conspirators, joining the College of Justice in 1584.

He bore a principal part in the downfall of the Earl of Arran, and the return of the banished Lords, although he was despatched by the former, then ignorant of his intentions, to accuse the latter at the court of Queen Elizabeth I of England. Gray received a New Year's Day gift of silver plate from Elizabeth in January 1585.

In March 1585 he was sent as ambassador to Elizabeth I to discuss border matters. His servant John Graham wrote to him that his wife and son James were well, and his cousin Thomas Bannatyne had spoken to the king and treasurer for funding and obtained 600 crowns, and 500 merks for his wife, Margaret Livingstone. Bannatyne wanted Bellenden to silk leggings for him and Bible for his wife, and a length of "best coloured" green stemming cloth. James VI instructed him to thank Sir Philip Sidney for the present of a lion hound, and asked him to the fairest and youngest bloodhound he could afford. He travelled back to Scotland with the English diplomat Edward Wotton in May.

He was in Stirling in November 1585 when the banished Lords surprised James VI and Arran there. The latter intended to have slain Bellenden, the Master of Gray, and the Secretary, "but they drew to their armes and stude on their awn defence," and Arran had too much on his hands with his enemies without the walls to attack them.

In 1586 he was Keeper of Blackness Castle. In February 1587 he wrote to Lord John Hamilton about Alexander Stewart, a diplomat who was involved in failed negotiations to save the life of Mary, Queen of Scots. In August 1587, Bellenden went on the King's progress to Inchmurrin and Dumbarton, and met Richard Douglas at Hamilton.

On 22 November 1587 he was appointed Keeper of Linlithgow Castle. On 24 December 1587 he was appointed (with his cousin Patrick, a son of Patrick Bellenden of Evie) Clerk of the Coquet of Edinburgh. This was a kind of customs official.

Bellenden seems to have been useful in procuring the consent of the clergy to the Act whereby the temporalities of the prelacies were annexed to the Crown in 1587, and was the same year named one of the Commissioners "for satisfying the clergy of the lyferents."

In 1589 he accompanied King James VI in his matrimonial excursion to Norway. James Melville of Halhill mentions that Bellenden did not sail in the king's ship, but in one of three other ships, along with John Carmichael, the Provost of Lincluden, William Keith of Delny, George Home, James Sandilands, and Peter Young.

James VI wrote from Oslo on 1 December 1589 to John, Lord Hamilton asking him to conclude a lawsuit with Bellenden, who the king described as "a man here that I am so much beholden to at this time".

He was sent the following spring as Ambassador to the court of Elizabeth, to formally announce the wedding and ask for funds for the royal households. He was given 666 Danish dalers from the queen's dowry to fund this diplomatic mission. According to David Calderwood, Bellenden was sent to England to ask for English ships to assist the royal fleet during the voyage from Denmark. Bellenden was in London by 6 April 1590, he returned in May 1590 without a payment of the annual subsidy money that Elizabeth had begun to usually pay to James VI. King James gave him £2,000 Scots.

== Death ==
Lewis Bellenden died in Edinburgh on 27 August 1591 after eight days of deadly fever, and was buried at Holyrood Abbey on 8 September.

The English ambassador in Edinburgh, Robert Bowes, wrote that his office of Justice Clerk would probably be given to the young laird of Whittingehame, his place in the Court of Session to Richard Cockburn of Clerkington, and the role of Master of Ceremonies at court to the Master of Work, William Schaw.

== Witchcraft ==
After his death, during the North Berwick Witch Trials there were attempts to connect him with the alleged events, and it was said he had contact with Ritchie Graham, who summoned the devil in Bellenden yard or garden.

== Family ==
Sir Lewis Bellenden married, by contract dated 4 July 1581, Margaret Livingstone daughter of William Livingstone, 6th Lord Livingston and Agnes Fleming. They had three sons and two daughters, of whom his son and heir was Sir James Bellenden of Broughton. Two other sons went to Ulster.

Margaret attended Anne of Denmark at her coronation. After Lewis' death, she was a gentlewoman in the households of Anne of Denmark and Prince Henry. She married Patrick Stewart, 2nd Earl of Orkney on 19 August 1596, on the day that Princess Elizabeth was born.
