= George Keith, 5th Earl Marischal =

Scottish politician

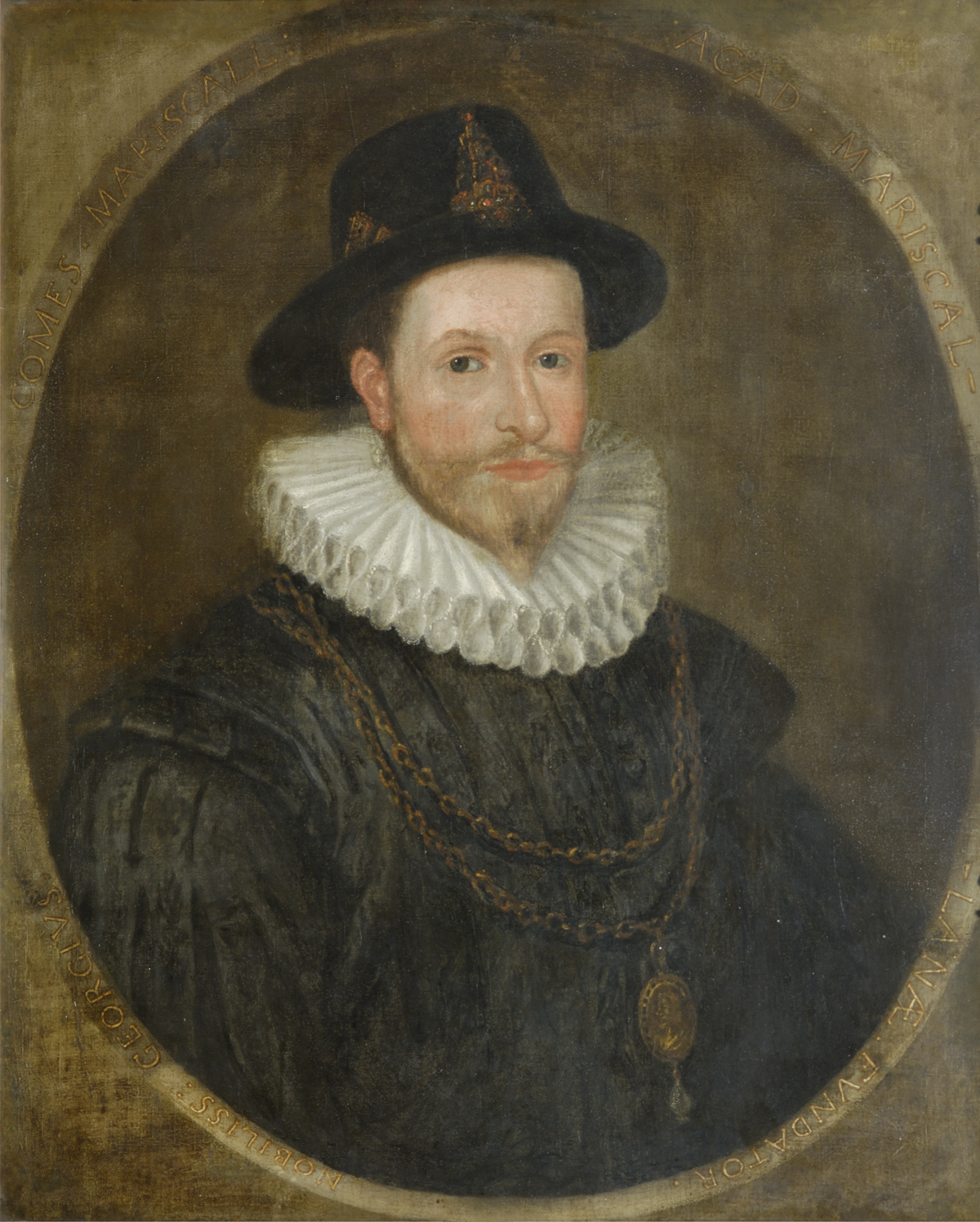
The 5th Earl Marischal, painted by Cosmo Alexander

George Keith, 5th Earl Marischal (c. 1553–1623) was a Scottish nobleman and Earl Marischal. He succeeded as earl on 7 October 1581, upon the death of his grandfather, William Keith, 4th Earl Marischal.

== Early life ==
George Keith was the son of William Keith, Master of Marischal, and his wife, Elizabeth Hay. Few details of his education are known, but in 1573 he went to Paris to study horsemanship, and during his travels lodged with Theodore Beza in Geneva where his younger brother William was killed by Spanish bandits. He returned to Scotland in 1580 when James VI made a northern progress and held a meeting of the Privy Council of Scotland at Dunnotar Castle on 18 June 1580. In October he was made a Gentleman of the King's Bedchamber. He was a firm Protestant, and took an active part in the affairs of the Church of Scotland.

In May 1583 he was at Linlithgow Palace and played football with the Earl of Bothwell. Bothwell knocked him over, then he kicked Bothwell on the leg. They decided to fight a duel the next day, but the Earl of Angus and the king, James VI, reconciled them.

== Arranging a royal marriage ==
Described as one of the most important and powerful men of his day in Scotland, he was sent as ambassador to Denmark in June 1589 to negotiate the marriage of James VI to Anne of Denmark. His companions were Andrew Keith, Lord Dingwall, James Scrimgeour Constable of Dundee, John Skene, William Fowler, and George Young. The English ambassador in Scotland, William Asheby, wrote that the Earl would be given £1,500 sterling from the English subsidy money for his expenses, and a payment of £10,000 Scots was recorded in the accounts kept by the Chancellor, John Maitland of Thirlestane. The Master of Gray thought Queen Elizabeth would be displeased by the use of her money for this. Gray heard that Marischal would bring Anne back to Scotland straightaway if the negotiations were successful. One guarantor or cautionar for the Earl's expenses was a wealthy Edinburgh tailor and supporter of the marriage plan, Alexander Oustean.

Marischal's specific instructions included; to ask for £1000,000 Scots to be sent to Scotland when the marriage was contracted, that Scots might be naturalized as Danish citizens for trading advantages, and that Scottish ships would be exempt of the toll or Sound Dues at Helsingør.

He took part in a wedding ceremony at Kronborg on 20 August 1589 which involved him sitting on Anne of Denmark's bed as a proxy for the king. Keith bought a jewel to give to the queen during the ceremony, at the request of King James, his credit assisted by Frederick Lyall, a Scottish merchant in Helsingør. Lyall was the factor of the Scottish merchant George Bruce of Carnock.

At the conclusion of the proxy wedding the earl was presented with jewels as a rewards, including a portrait miniature of Sophie of Mecklenburg-Güstrow and, it is said, he was gifted timber for building and roofing his house at Keith Marischal. Celebrations in Denmark included a performance of a Latin play by Plautus.

There was discussion whether the queen's dowry money should be brought home untouched to Scotland, or whether he and his kinsmen, Lord Dingwall and William Keith of Delny, should be recompensed. The Earl and Maitland disagreed over this and other issues. Marischal set sail for Scotland in his ship with the queen's fleet, the Gabriel, but the ships were driven by adverse winds to Flekkerøy. James VI wrote to the Earl, (who he called "My little fat pork"), on 28 September asking for news, and worried about the "longer protracting of time" and the "contrariousness of winds".

Marischal took a lead role in discussions at Flekkerøy and it was decided that Anne of Denmark would stay in Oslo. James VI sailed from Leith to meet his bride there. King James rewarded him on 25 November with the temporal lordship of Deer Abbey.

== Later life ==
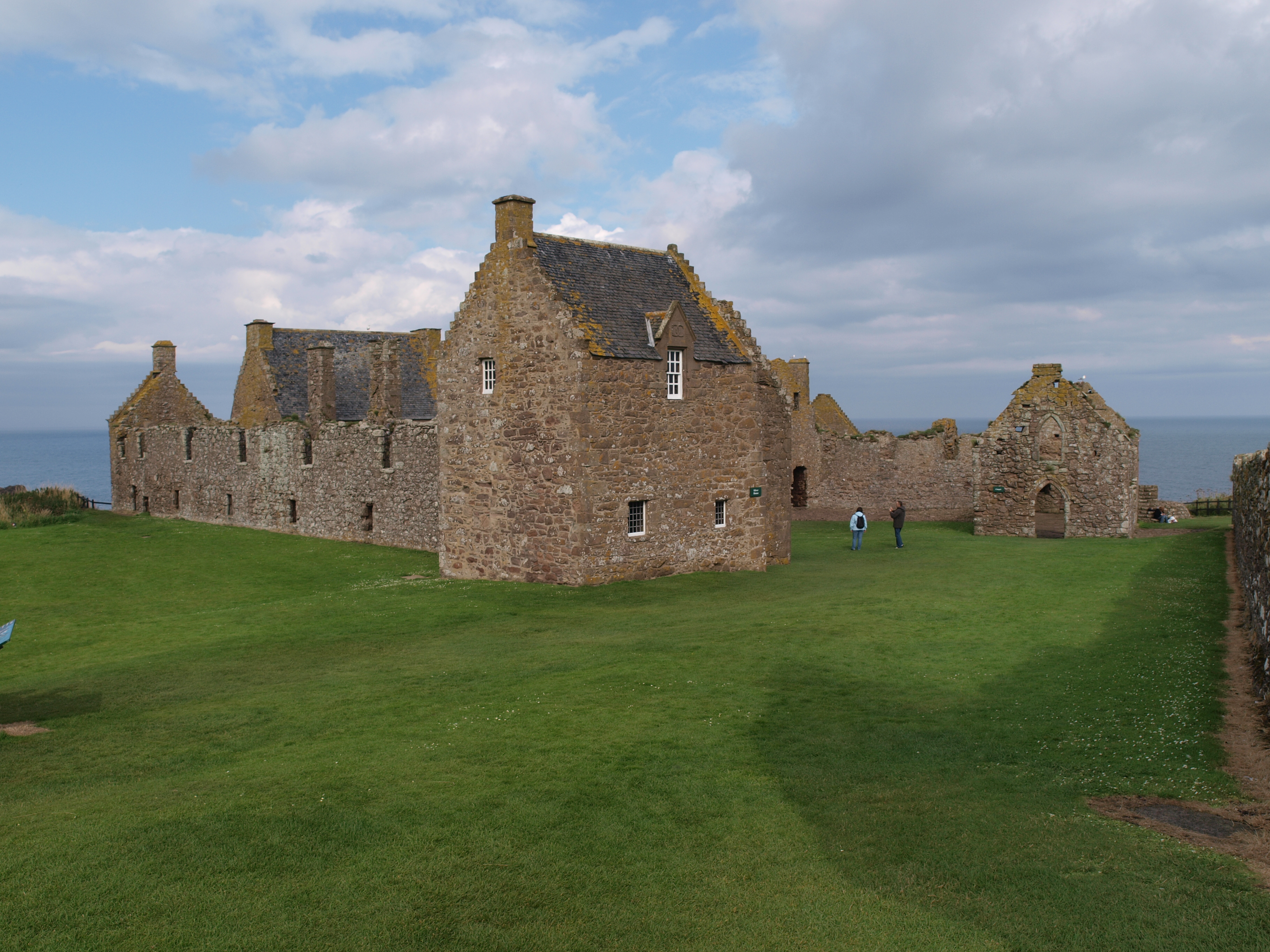
Dunnottar Castle from south-west

On 14 April 1592 his wife Margaret, Countess Marischal, welcomed Captain Thomas Kerr or Carr and his brothers and friends to Dunnotar Castle, and they took command of the castle. At first it was thought they were agents of the Earl of Huntly and the lairds of Aberdeenshire began to assemble to recover the castle, but soon it was reported that the countess herself had invite Kerr to eject the earl's servants who had displeased her. In May 1592 the earl and his wife were at Perth and said to reconciled.

He founded the Marischal College in New Aberdeen in 1593 and was Royal commissioner to the Parliament of Scotland in 1609. In the early 1590s he inherited the title of Lord Altrie from an uncle, Robert.

He rebuilt his family seat of Keith Marischal in 1589, and also constructed new buildings at Dunnottar Castle. He also built new harbours at Stonehaven and Peterhead, using Norwegian timber and employing the mason James Mackene. The earl had a fishing boat and house at Footdee in Aberdeen, as well as a townhouse between the Tolbooth and the Quay. Other houses included "Gubriell" near Dunfermline. In 1595 he bought a cargo of Norwegian timber for building Peterhead harbour from Thomas Ogilvy, with his ship, the Bonaventure. However, the ship did not belong to Ogilvy.

The Earl employed a painter Andrew Melville or Mailling, who lived at Stonehaven. At Dunnotar Castle, the Earl reset a stone from the Antonine Wall and had it painted and gilded. The stone is now at the Hunterian Museum in Glasgow. His interest in classical epigraphy was shared by one of the Danish diplomats involved in negotiating the royal marriage, Paul Knibbe.

He preferred literature to public affairs, and about 1620 he retired to Dunnottar Castle. He died there on 2 April 1623.

== Marriages and children ==
He married firstly (c. Feb. 1581) Margaret (d. 1598), the daughter of Alexander Home, 5th Lord Home and Margaret Ker, a daughter of Sir Walter Ker of Cessford. Their children included:

- William Keith, 6th Earl Marischal.
- Anne Keith who married William Douglas, 7th Earl of Morton.
- Margaret Keith who married Sir Robert Arbuthnott, of Arbuthnott (contract dated 23 Dec 1615) as his first wife. She died shortly after but had no issue.
- Mary Keith married John Campbell of Cawdor
- Gilbert Keith of Benholm who married Margaret Lindsay

He married secondly (c. 1599), Margaret Ogilvy daughter of James Ogilvy, 5th Lord Ogilvy of Airlie. Their children included:

- James Keith of Benholm, born 1599. He married, before 19 March 1623, Margaret, daughter of Sir David Lindsay of Edzell, by whom he had:

 (1) Margaret, married before 1650, to Sir John Elphinstone of Elphinstone, and had issue.  
 (2) Elizabeth, married, as his first wife, to Sir Archibald Primrose of Dalmeny. 
 (3) Anna, married to Patrick Smith of Braco (contract dated 1652).

- Sir John Alexander Keith b. 10 Oct 1611 d. 1639, married Jeane Watsonne. Parents of Rev George Keith, Scottish Missionary

== Jewels ==
Margaret Ogilvy became involved with Sir Alexander Strachan of Thornton. She was accused of taking furnishings and a green coffer belonging to the Earl Marischal from his house at Benholm in 1622. The chest was supposed to contain property deeds, Portuguese ducats, 36 dozen gold buttons, a rich jewel set with diamonds worth 6,000 merks given to the earl when he was ambassador in Denmark, a miniature portrait of Sophie of Mecklenburg-Güstrow, Queen of Denmark set in gold and circled with diamonds worth 5,000 merks, a "jasp" stone believed to stem the flow of blood, a chain of 400 well-matched pearls, two gold chains, and other jewels and rings. The Benholm furnishings included tapestry and silver plate. She married Thornton, and in 1625 as a legal settlement she returned part of this treasure to the new earl.

== Arms ==
Coat of arms of the Earl Marischal
Crest A Hart's Head erased proper armed with ten Tynes Or. Escutcheon Argent on a Chief Gules three Palets Or; behind the shield two Baton Gules semy of Thistles ensigned on the top with an Imperial Crown Or placed saltirewise being the insignia of the office of Great Marischal of Scotland. Supporters On either side a Hart proper attired as in the Crest. Motto Veritas Vincit (Truth conquers)

Parliament of Scotland
Preceded by The Duke of Lennox	Lord High Commissioner; 1609–1617	Succeeded by The Marquess of Hamilton
Peerage of Scotland
Preceded by William Keith	Earl Marischal; 1581–1623	Succeeded by William Keith
Preceded by Robert Keith	Lord Altrie; 1593–1623	Succeeded by William Keith
