= Lord Altrie =

Lord Altrie is a title in the Peerage of Scotland that was created on 29 July 1587 for Robert Keith. On his death, about 1593, it was inherited by his nephew George Keith, 5th Earl Marischal, and remained united with that title, until its forfeiture in 1715 by George Keith, 10th Earl Marischal.

== Lords Altrie (1587) ==
- Robert Keith, 1st Lord Altrie (died ca. 1593)
- George Keith, 5th Earl Marischal and 2nd Lord Altrie (ca. 1553–1623)

For further Lords: see Earl Marischal
