= William Keith of Delny =

Scottish courtier

Sir William Keith of Delny (died 1599) was a Scottish courtier and Master of the Royal Wardrobe. He also served as ambassador for James VI to various countries. He was an important intermediary between George Keith, 5th Earl Marischal and the king, the king and courtiers, and the king and foreign governments.

== Career ==
William Keith was a son of Andrew Keith, laird of Ravenscraig, Aberdeenshire, and distantly related to the Earls Marischal. In 1579, he was made a valet in the household of James VI of Scotland.

In May 1583 he accompanied Colonel William Stewart and John Colville on an embassy to London to seek English support for the government of William Ruthven, 1st Earl of Gowrie. On 1 June he was attacked and insulted by Marmaduke Hedworth, Robert Banks, and others outside Durham on the way back. Hedworth declared Keith was a "Scottish villain" and he replied "I am a gentleman."

Delny had sufficient influence to request that a namesake tailor, William Keith, be made a burgess of Edinburgh in April 1585.

== England 1586 ==
In January 1586, William Cecil wrote to the Earl of Leicester with news that James VI had sent his envoy William Keith of Delny to London to conclude their league. Keith was involved in collecting the gifts of money which Queen Elizabeth gave to James VI, and made account of the money on 17 May 1586. On 19 May Keith was granted lands in Delny in Ross-shire for his good service.

=== Mary, Queen of Scots ===
Delny arrived in London on 5 November 1586 to intercede for the life of Mary, Queen of Scots, carrying the king's letter of instructions for Archibald Douglas. At that time, the French ambassador Du Preau, known as Courcelles, described Delny as a "pensionary and creature of the Queen of England".

He met up with Archibald Douglas and had an audience with Queen Elizabeth on 10 November. They requested that any proceedings against Mary should be delayed until members of the Privy Council of Scotland were present, and that nothing should prejudice James VI's succession to the English throne. Douglas and Delny attended a banquet with the commissioners at Mary's trial at Burghley's London house on 22 November, and were assured that nothing at Mary's trial had prejudiced James VI's title. James VI wrote to Delny that the execution of his mother would be a greater tragedy than the deaths of Anne Boleyn and Catherine Howard. Delny was reluctant to pass this letter to Elizabeth, but she heard of it, and Delny was forced to show it to her, and she was furious. Elizabeth was in a "passion" and the Earl of Leicester made a speech about the Scottish king's good intentions to appease her.

William Cecil wrote to Delny about "so strange and unseasonable message, as did directly touch her noble father (Henry VIII), herself, and all the estates of her present Parliament." Cecil said Elizabeth was now reluctant to receive further ambassadors from James VI. During the negotiations, Douglas said to Delny that he was "simple", meaning both honest and unsophisticated, and Delny wrote to John Maitland of Thirlestane that Douglas was a serpent in the likeness of a man, who had no care for the matter.

In January 1587 Delny was joined in London by Sir Robert Melville of Murdocairny and the Master of Gray to intercede for the life of Mary. After Mary was executed, their speeches and manner of mediation were said to have been counter-productive, and when Sir John Seton of Barnes was dismissed from household service in July, it was thought Delny would lose his place. Despite his failure to secure his mother's life, James VI knighted Delny in August at time of the Parliament and made him Master of the Wardrobe.

On 1 August James VI confirmed him as owner of Delny and granted him other lands which had been part of the Lordship of Ross. These lands were made into a new barony of Delny. William Keith received £5,000 Scots in part payment for providing the king's clothes in 1588.

== Privy Council ==
He was admitted to the privy council in March 1588. On 17 March he wrote to Walsingham mentioning the arguments in favour of James VI marrying Catherine de Bourbon the sister of Henry of Navarre. At this time he transferred £10,000 Scots to the Lord Chancellor, John Maitland of Thirlestane, from the English subsidy money which Elizabeth gave to James VI.

In July 1589 it was expected that Delny and the English courtier Roger Aston would lose their positions at court because they had been supporters of the Master of Gray, who was now out of favour. Their opponents, the followers of the Earl of Huntly and Sir John Seton of Barnes called Aston, Keith, and the Lord Privy Seal, "Queen Elizabeth's pensioners", this insult may be a reference to the English subsidy pensions or other payments.

== Denmark and downfall ==
In June 1589, an English sailor George Beeston arrived in the Forth and Delny was sent to greet him. In October Delny was in the retinue which accompanied James VI to Norway and Denmark to collect his future Queen, Anne of Denmark. James Melville of Halhill mentions that Delny did not sail in the king's ship, but in one of three other ships, along with Lewis Bellenden, John Carmichael, the Provost of Lincluden, George Home, James Sandilands, and Peter Young.

After the royal wedding at Oslo, Colonel William Stewart sailed back to Edinburgh with instructions for the royal homecoming in the spring, and news of arguments between Chancellor of Scotland, John Maitland of Thirlestane, and the Earl Marischal and his kinsman William Keith of Delny, over precedence and the Queen's dowry. James VI ordered Chancellor Maitland to give jewels to Christian IV and his mother Sophie of Mecklenburg and other royals. These gifts included four great table diamonds and two great rubies set in gold rings which Delny had brought to Denmark. There was discussion whether the queen's dowry money should be brought home untouched to Scotland, or whether the Earl Marischal, Lord Dingwall and Delny should be recompensed. James VI gave Delny 830 Danish dalers from the dowry for clothes received in Denmark.

During their time in Denmark, the king sacked Delny as keeper of the wardrobe, allegedly for appearing in richer clothing than himself, and appointed Sir George Home in his stead. In the days before Delny lost his place, Robert Douglas, Provost of Lincluden on 4 April 1590 wrote "Sir William Keith is lyke to be casin, and to tyne his offices, credit and all." A correspondent of Francis Walsingham wrote on 5 April 1590 that the Chancellor, John Maitland of Thirlestane, aimed to discredit the Earl Marischal and Delny, but Delny was "wonderfully well beloved" and had "ever worn his sword on the right and true side". Archibald Douglas suggested Keith's allies were a threat to Maitland, and a royal guard raised by Sir John Carmichael was chiefly to protect the Chancellor.

=== Out of favour ===
In the summer of 1590, Delny fell under suspicion of conspiring with the Earl Marischal and Alexander Home, 6th Lord Home to murder the Lord Chancellor. When, in July, the Earl Marischal was arrested, he sought the protection of Francis Stewart, 5th Earl of Bothwell. In the last week of July, Delny stayed at the house of Dorothea Stewart, Countess of Gowrie, near Holyrood Palace, hoping to regain the king's favour. Possibly unaware of his increasing difficulties, Christian IV of Denmark wrote to James VI on 3 August 1590 interceding for Delny's return to favour.

James VI became angry about discussions that Delny might marry the Countess of Gowrie, and would have made him appear before the Privy Council in July 1591. The English ambassador Robert Bowes noted in July 1591 that Delny "lay in bed" once or twice at Morham Tower with the owner, the rebellious Bothwell. When news that Delny had joined Bothwell's retinue reached the king, his estates were forfeited. He subsequently fled into exile with Bothwell.

Delny regained royal favour in June 1592, apparently as a result of the intervention of Anne of Denmark, though he did not recover his office in the wardrobe. In January 1593 he was given the barony of Dingwall, which his kinsman Andrew Keith, Lord Dingwall had resigned. The letter of gift thanked Delny for his services to the king including a role in the proxy marriage to Anne of Denmark in 1589.

=== Later years ===
Delny became an associate of Ludovick Stuart, 2nd Duke of Lennox. On 6 May 1593 the Duke and 15 friends subscribed to a frivolous legal document swearing to abstain from wearing gold and silver trimmings on their clothes for a year, and defaulters were to pay for a banquet for all of them at John Killoch's house in Edinburgh. This "passement bond" was in part inspired by cheap counterfeit gold and silver thread used in "passements great or small, plain or à jour, bissets, lilykins, cordons, and fringes" which quickly discoloured. The signatories included; Lord Home, the Earl of Mar, Lord Spynie, the Master of Glamis, Sir Thomas Erskine, Walter Stewart of Blantyre, David Seton of Parbroath, and Sir George Home.

In 1593 Delny as chamberlain of the lands of Ross and Ardmannoch delivered his account of royal income to the comptroller, David Seton of Parbroath. In February James VI confirmed his grant of the barony of Delny and gave him the patronage of three parish churches, noting his devotion to spreading the Gospel.

In October 1593 Delny was in London and met secretly with Anthony Bacon, a follower of the Earl of Essex. Bacon wrote to Delny that Essex would accept a letter from James VI at Richmond Palace and he should burn the letter and not tell anybody about their meeting.

Delny wrote to James Hudson in March 1594. Hudson had been one of the king's viola players, the four Hudson brothers, and was now a resident diplomatic agent in London. Delny wrote that he had read Hudson's previous three letters to the king. Both James VI and Anne of Denmark had told him that John Wemyss of Logie had no diplomatic mission from them. Delny urged Hudson to be careful in the king's affairs, not to upset the delicate issue of the succession. After other matters, Delny wished Hudson to convey his thanks to Sir Roger Williams and Fulke Greville. Hudson made a copy of this letter for Bacon and Essex.

In 1594 Delny carried invitations to the baptism and tournament at Stirling Castle for Prince Henry to the Dutch Republic. Sir James Melville of Halhill said he was not suited to the role because he could not speak French, Latin, or Flemish. His partner in this embassy was Captain William Murray of Pitcarleis, Provost of St Andrews. They were instructed to confirm previous peace treaties and to give good report of Adrian Damman van Bijsterveld, the resident diplomat of the States General at the court of Scotland, and ask that Scots soldiers serving in the Eighty Years' War be paid.

The ambassadors from the Dutch Republic at the baptism, Walraven III van Brederode (1547–1614) and Jacob Valke, treasurer of Zeeland, brought Prince Henry a gift of a guaranteed income. Delny was appointed chamberlain of the Prince's household and collector of this money on 1 October 1594. Delny lost this role in 1595 when the Earl of Mar, as guardian of the Prince at Stirling Castle, was given charge of the Dutch income. Delny left the round box with the letter of gift in Edinburgh with John Gourlay, and in 1601 Gourlay delivered it to George Home of Spott.

=== Venice ===
Delny left Edinburgh for Venice on 4 October 1595. He went first to London, then embarked with Henry Hawkyns, a nephew of Christopher Yelverton, a companion recommended by Anthony Bacon. Delny wrote to Bacon in November offering his services to Queen Elizabeth against Spain. Delny said he would have delivered James VI's letter and message in person to Essex, if the earl had been in London, requesting hawks and also asking that the rebel Francis Stewart, 5th Earl of Bothwell should not be welcomed in England. Bacon should give the answers to the king's requests to Thomas Foulis. Delny was in Venice to canvas support for James VI. He explained to the senators of Venice that he was not an ambassador, but came to learn the language and further the king's private business.

Delny wrote to Foulis from Padua, and mentioned the secure way that he had folded the king's letter, and disguised the address. Such practices are known as "letterlocking" a term first coined by Jana Dambrogio:

I close his majesties lettir, swa that giff he taik not ane knyff and cott it owt, it will ryff; lykwys I have cloissit roidlie, that it be not brokin owt or kend, sua exquisse my roidnes lowrd in this.
I close his majesty's letter so that if he does not use a knife and cut it open, it will tear, also I have sealed it rudely, so it might not be picked out and known, so exuse my rough rudeness in this.

In April 1597 James VI asked Delny to correspond with Venice, to bolster support for his accession to the throne of England.

=== Death ===
A legal case mentions his death and the cessation of payments owed to creditor in 1599. A charter of July 1601 mentions his death, and an earlier note in the royal wardrobe accounts made in 1599 by Thomas Foulis and Robert Jousie also refers to his decease. He had three children, Sara, and two sons, both called William. His property passed to his brother, John Keith of Ravenscraig.

Delny owed the banker Thomas Foulis £6248 Scots. His brother and heir, John Keith of Craig was liable to repay the debt to James Foulis of Colinton. The debt was probably connected with the royal wardrobe. In 1605 the debts due to the Master of Gray were examined, including £1000 given to Delny as Master of the Wardrobe.

=== Heraldry ===
Keith used a seal in 1594 quartering the Keith arms used by the Earl Marischal and Andrew Keith, Lord Dingwall, (argent a chief paly of or and gules), with 2nd three cushions in a flowered tressure, and 3rd a bend between three cross crosslets and three mullets.
