= James Anstruther =

Scottish landowner and courtier (died 1606)

Sir James Anstruther of Anstruther (died 1606), was a Scottish landowner and courtier.

== Family background ==
He was a son of John Anstruther and Margaret Clephane, daughter of George Clephane of Carslogie. His second wife was Margaret Learmonth, daughter of James Learmonth of Dairsie and Balcomie. James Anstruther married Jean Scott.

== Career at court ==
In May 1580, the "young laird of Anstruther" was one of 25 gentlemen appointed to accompany James VI at "all times of his riding and passing to the fields". In February 1584, James VI appointed John Anstruther of that Ilk, and his son James Anstruther "feuar" of Anstruther, to be searchers of the customs of Anstruther.

James Anstruther served as carver (or cupbearer) and subsequently Master of Household to Anne of Denmark, the wife of James VI of Scotland. Apart from ceremonial duties and attendance, the role involved accounting for the food and allowances of servants and courtiers appointed to the royal household, and an overview of the finances of the household. Amongst the recorded expenses of the household, he paid the queen's Danish servants £600 Scots for their fees and wages for the Whitsunday term of 1593, but the Martinmas bill was only £400. Anstruther was commended by James VI for his efforts to reduce the costs of his queen's household on 17 May 1595, and given the office for life. The role was shared in turn by Harry Lindsay of Kinfauns, Patrick Hume of Polwarth, and David Beaton of Melgund.

In September 1594, Anstruther was arrested and questioned, suspected with John Wemyss of Logie of aiding the rebel Francis Stewart, 5th Earl of Bothwell.

In March 1595, Anstruther was involved in a struggle in Edinburgh with the Provost, Alexander Home of North Berwick and the laird of Ferniehirst, Thomas Kerr. One of gardeners at Holyrood Palace John Morrison had injured a servant of Ferniehirst. He imprisoned the gardener in his wife's lodging in Edinburgh in Thomas Craig's house on the Royal Mile. Anne of Denmark sent Anstruther to rescue Morrison, and he brought sledgehammers (called "foir-hammers") to break into the house. The Provost intervened and imprisoned the gardener in the Tolbooth. Anne of Denmark sent to James VI at Stirling Castle to enlist his support and the Edinburgh baillies John MacMorran and William Hamilton also rode to Stirling to give their side of the story.

In 1598, he joined a plan to resettle the Isle of Lewis with a group known as the Gentlemen Adventurers of Fife.

In 1601, he was Master of Household to James VI.

Anstruther died in 1606. His heir was William Anstruther. Sir Robert Anstruther, the diplomat, was his second son.

A portrait of James Anstruther gives his age as 36 in 1591. The picture seems to be a copy of a portrait in the style of Adrian Vanson.
