= Robert Bowes (diplomat) =

16th-century English ambassador to Scotland

Sir Robert Bowes
- Died: 15 November 1597; Berwick Castle
- Buried: Berwick Castle
- Spouses: Anne Bowes; Eleanor Musgrave
- Issue: Ralph Bowes
- Father: Richard Bowes
- Mother: Elizabeth Aske

Robert Bowes (1535?–1597) was an English diplomat, stationed as permanent ambassador to Scotland from 1577 to 1583.

== Family ==
Robert Bowes was the fifth but second surviving son of Richard Bowes (d. 10 November 1558) and Elizabeth Aske.

He had four elder brothers, Ralph, Francis, George (d. 20 August 1580), and Christopher, and seven sisters: Bridget, who married Thomas Hussey; Anne, who married Marmaduke Vincent; Muriel, who married John Jackson; Margery, who married the Scottish reformer John Knox; Elizabeth, who married George Bainbrigge; Margaret, who married firstly Thomas Middleton and secondly Ambrose Birkbeck; and Jane.

== Career ==
He was educated at Queens' College, Cambridge. He served under his father in the defence of the borders. In 1569 he was sheriff of the county palatine of Durham, and helped his brother, Sir George Bowes, to hold Barnard Castle against the rebel earls. Afterwards he was sent in command of a troop of horse to protect the west marches. In 1571 he was elected M.P. for Carlisle. In 1575 he was appointed treasurer of Berwick, and in this capacity had many dealings with the Scottish court.

Bowes owned a ship, a hoy, which carried building materials for a pier at Berwick. Bowes wrote a detailed description of the pier's construction which he thought to be storm proof. The hoy sank, loaded with coal and timber, with the loss of its crew. There was controversy between Bowes and the surveyor Rowland Johnson over the cost of the pier.

=== In Scotland ===
In 1577 he was appointed ambassador in Scotland, where he had difficult tasks to perform: to counteract the influence of France, retain a hold on James VI, keep together a party that was favourable to England, and promote disunion among the Scottish nobles. In 1578 he managed by his tact to compose a quarrel between James Douglas, 4th Earl of Morton and the privy council which threatened to plunge Scotland into civil war. In 1581 he was busily employed in endeavouring to counteract the growing influence of Esme Stewart, lord of Aubigné, over James VI. He witnessed the events which led to the raid of Ruthven and D'Aubigné's fall. He tried hard to gain possession of the casket letters, which after Morton's death were said to have come into the hands of John Ruthven, 3rd Earl of Gowrie, but his attempts failed.

In April 1583 he gave gold chains as gifts to two secret Scottish contacts of Francis Walsingham. He thought that James VI was trying to get rid of him by employing Lord Doune. He managed to procure his recall from in 1583, but he still held the post of treasurer of Berwick, and was often employed on diplomatic missions in Scotland.

Bowes took delivery of £3000 subsidy money that Elizabeth I paid to James VI in 1588 and gave it to John Carmichael at Cawmills (now Edrington). In 1588 or 1589 a Scottish diplomat in London, Samuel Cockburn of Templehall, husband of the poet Elizabeth Douglas, sent him household goods and clothing by sea but the ship was taken by pirates.

Bowes met the bride of James VI, Anne of Denmark on 3 May 1590 at her lodging in the King's Wark at Leith. He told her Queen Elizabeth was pleased with her letters, and she said she was thankful for the favour and goodwill she found in Elizabeth's letter to her.

Bowes attended St Giles Kirk and the town council provided velvet cushions for his and his wife Eleanor Bowes' seats in the loft or gallery. He had a chest in his Edinburgh lodging which contained copies of the family trees of the Scottish nobility. His servant George Nicholson made copies of these for Burghley. Eleanor Bowes had the key of the chest.

Bowes lodged in the house of the Fowler family, which belonged to the widow Janet Fockart. In the early 1590s Giacomo Castelvetro, an Italian writer who served James VI as a language tutor and secretary, lodged with them and Eleanor Bowes made friends with his wife, Isotta de Canonici, the widow of Thomas Erastus.

Some of the information he sent to England came from Scottish informers who he called "talesmen".

=== Bowes, Bothwell, and the witch trials ===
Bowes wrote to William Cecil on 23 July 1590 describing the arrival in Scotland of news of witchcraft trials in Denmark, and arrests in Scotland:

It is advertised from Denmark, that the admirall (Peder Munk) there hathe caused five or six witches to be taken in Coupnahaven, upon suspicion that by their witche craft they had stayed the Queen of Scottes (Anne of Denmark) voyage into Scotland, and sought to have stayed likewise the King's retourne.
Sundrie witches were arreigned yesterdaye in this towne, and are found guiltie of odious crimes, chieflie that some of them made in wax the image of the young laird of Wardhouse, and rosting the image the gentleman pined awaye by sweate as the wax melteth before the fire.

Bowes also described a woman from Lübeck who claimed to a prophet, who was interviewed by George Young and thought to be a fraud. In February 1591 a Scottish woman called Agnes Sampson was accused of witchcraft during the North Berwick Witch Trials. She said that Bowes was "a little black and fat man with black hair", who had given her gold in a cellar while James VI was in Denmark to make a charm with a toad to hurt the king and make him infertile. Bowes noted that the personal description was inaccurate. He made arrangements that English border officials including John Selby would send any suspect witches fleeing to England back to Scotland.

Bowes was concerned by the arrival at Glasgow of an Irish rebel Brian O'Rourke who sought the favour and support of James VI in February 1591. He asked James VI to have O'Rourke sent to Berwick or Carlisle. James VI sent Roger Aston to meet O'Rourke, who had bought a gift of Irish hunting hounds. Subsequently, the king sent John Carmichael and William Stewart of Blantyre to take O'Rourke to England on 3 April. This caused a riot in Glasgow, because the arrest was thought likely to damage the Irish trade, and the king's officers were cursed as "Queen Elizabeth's knights" and the king for taking "English angels", the annuity or subsidy received from Queen Elizabeth. Bowes contributed £47 to O'Rourke's debt with a tailor in Glasgow.

Richie Graham was questioned about witchcraft practices and Bothwell, and mentioned Jely Dunkyn (Geillis Duncan) who convened the witches for him. She told James VI that Bothwell had consulted them, then said it was Bowes. Graham accused Bowes of working against the king.

A paper written in defence of the Earl of Bothwell, possibly by the kirk minister Robert Bruce mentions the rendition of "a gleid witche" from England in return for Brian O'Rourke. Her testimony cleared Bothwell. Bowes wrote around the same time that "Kennedy the witch of Reydon, lately in England" had testified against Bothwell and agreed with his accuser Richie Graham. Annie Cameron suggests that Kennedy was the "gleid" or "squinting" witch. Modern historians identify her as Janet Kennedy of Redden in Sprouston near Kelso.

In July 1592 Bowes foiled an attempt by Bothwell and his followers to capture James VI from a ferry boat while he was crossing the Forth. The plot was revealed to Bowes by an informer who wanted the reward of a licence to import English beer. Bothwell waited out of sight from Leith beyond the island of Inchkeith, and when he realised he was rumbled, put in at Wardie. Bowes heard that Bothwell had given his followers an orientation speech before this enterprise, reminding his men not to hurt the king. His accomplice Archibald Wauchope of Niddrie then asked them all to raise their hands and promise not to harm the king, holding both his hands in the air.

=== Anne of Denmark and Edinburgh ===
Anne of Denmark told him that she would like to meet Queen Elizabeth, and wanted to have a young English gentleman or maiden of "good parentage" join her household. Bowes passed this request to Cecil to consider.

In July 1593 he was asked to find out how money given yearly to James VI by Elizabeth as an annuity or subsidy had been spent. Bowes lodged at the house of William Fowler in Edinburgh. On 24 July 1593 Bowes entertained the Danish ambassador Steen Bille in his lodging while the Earl of Bothwell stayed next door, prior to breaking into Holyroodhouse. In September 1593 Bowes's wife, Eleanor Musgrave organised a dinner at their lodging, serving venison in the English manner for the Earl and Countess of Atholl, and they were joined by the Earl and Countess of Bothwell.

Early in 1595, Bowes and Alexander Home of North Berwick, the Provost of Edinburgh, took witness statements from the crew of the Bruce, a ship owned by George Bruce of Carnock which had been commandeered by English privateers off the coast of Spain and forced to take on board a number of enslaved Africans.

Anne of Denmark made another ouverture of friendship to Elizabeth I in May 1595, asking for her portrait. There was no response and Bowes had to reiterate her request. Finally, in February 1596 Elizabeth condescended to grant Anne's "earnest desire" and send her picture.

Elizabeth came to be concerned at rumours that Anne of Denmark, a Lutheran, had become a Catholic. Bowes brought Elizabeth's letter asking for "a few of her lines" in reply to satisfy her. Anne told Bowes that that there had been practices to draw her to change her religion.

=== Princess Elizabeth ===
Bowes wrote news about the birth of Princess Elizabeth at Dunfermline Palace. Her christening was proposed to be held on the birthday of her mother Anne of Denmark and then changed (back) to 28 November 1596 at Holyrood Palace. Bowes carried the infant to the chapel as the representative of Queen Elizabeth, who was her godmother. The Duke of Lennox and the Earl of Mar assisted him. Bowes had no gift from Elizabeth however. The baillies and Provost of Edinburgh, Alexander Home of North Berwick came to the feast and banquet and made a gift of 10,000 Scottish merks. This gift was presented as a grant written with golden letters in a golden coffer given to Anna of Denmark. Bowes noted the princess would live at Linlithgow Palace where her keeper Lady Livingstone was an "obstinate papist". Bowes was sick and stayed in bed in the days after the ceremony from his "old disease and infirmity in the hardness of my spleen".

Bowes wrote to Lord Burghley in August 1597 that the king was "lately pestered and many ways troubled in the examination of the witches which swarm in exceeding number and (as is credibly reported) in many thousands". This period has become known as the "Great Scottish Witch Hunt of 1597."

== Death ==
Bowes went to Scotland in the autumn of 1597, "crossing the water in dangerous tempests". He was ill and there was plague in Edinburgh. His wife waited at Berwick expecting his return from Scotland, and hearing his illness had worsened, she travelled to Edinburgh to meet him on 6 October. John Carey, the Chamberlain of Berwick, reported the progress of Bowes' sickness and canvassed for his job of Treasurer of Berwick. Bowes arrived at Berwick on 5 November, "keeping to his bed, and ever worse and worse". He was able to write to William Cecil, nominating his son Ralph Bowes to perform the duty of paying the garrison. He sent the letter with his servant Christopher Sheperdson.

Like his brother, Sir George, Robert Bowes worked at his own cost, and was rewarded by not much more than royal gratitude. Elizabeth held him at his post, and he died in Berwick on 15 or 6 November 1597.

The Scottish poet and courtier William Fowler wrote an epitaph with the lines,

And you white Swannes of Thames and Tweide proclame,
Your grieuous losses, and his high desert,
Who both his courses, and his cares did frame,
All dangers from your bankes aye to divert.
He lov'd his Queene and crowne with upright heart,
Postponing private wealth, to publicke weale.

His servant George Nicholson became the resident English diplomat or agent in Scotland. A nephew of Sir Robert Bowes, William Bowes, was ambassador to Scotland in 1598 and 1601.

== Marriages and issue ==
He married firstly his first cousin, Anne Bowes, Anne (died c. 1566), the daughter and coheir of Sir George Bowes of Dalden, by whom he had a son, Ralph Bowes (d. 1623).

He married secondly, in 1566, Eleanor Musgrave (1546–1623), daughter of Sir Richard Musgrave (1524–1555) of Hartley and Eden Hall in Cumberland and Agnes Wharton, by whom he had no issue.

Eleanor Bowes wrote to the diplomat and former court musician James Hudson in July 1596, describing her for fortunes in uncertain times, "or good like shall happen in my handling, or a farewell to my flitting tent for ever pitching in this place any more, ... and God send some better seasons". In June 1601 she had sent gifts to Anne of Denmark in Scotland with Roger Aston, and Bowes asked Robert Bruce of Kinnaird if his wife Martha Douglas could ask discretely if they had arrived.

His sister Marjory Bowes (d.1560) married the Scottish church reformer John Knox.
