= Food and the Scottish royal household =

Expenses made to feed the Scottish royal household

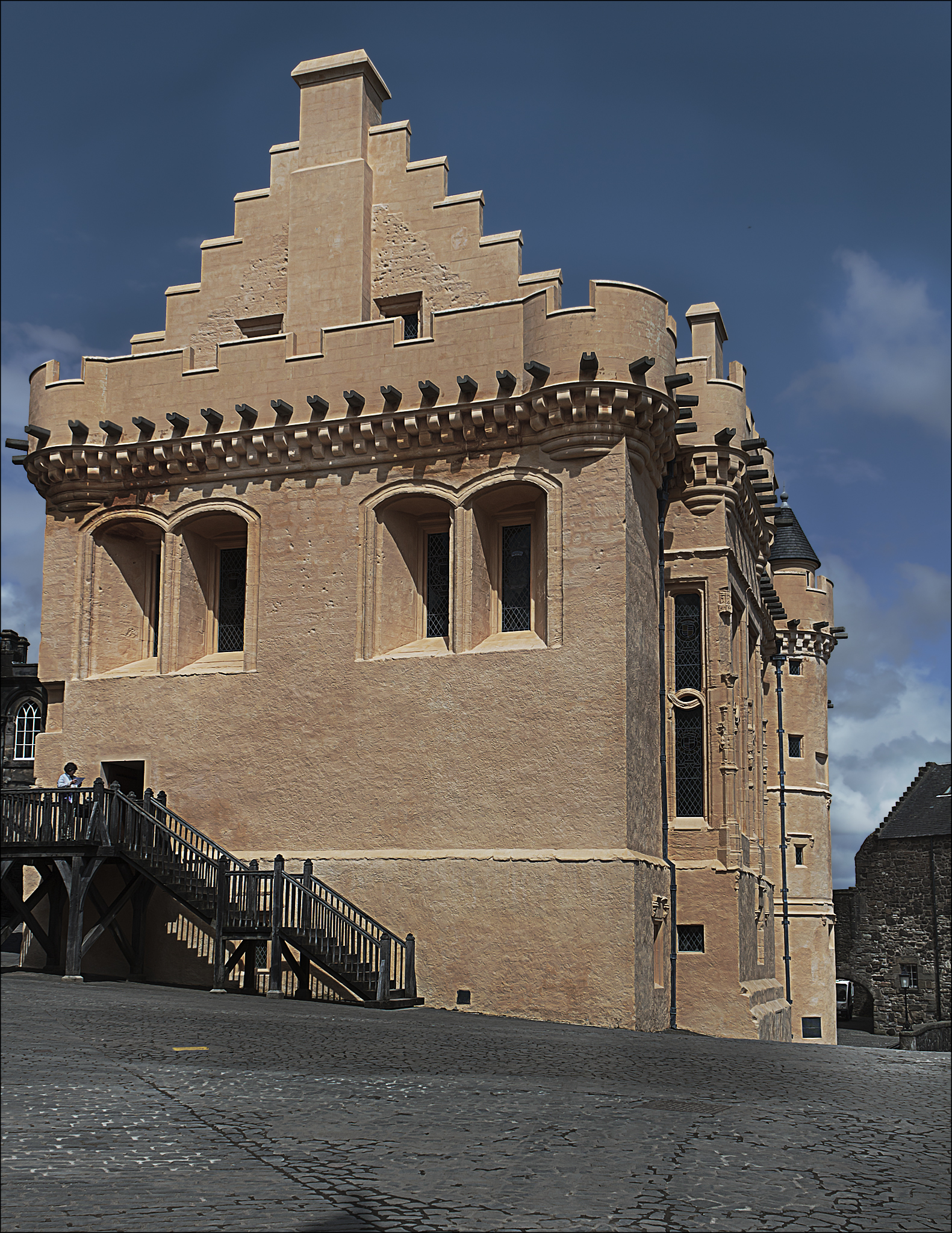
The Great Hall at Stirling Castle was built by James IV of Scotland to host banquets to overawe his nobility

Records survive of the expenses made to feed the Scottish royal household in the sixteenth century, and the remains of royal kitchens can be seen in the ruins of palaces and castles. Archaeologists can recover evidence of diet from deposits including waste from meals and food preparation. The expenses were managed by courtiers appointed as Masters of the Household.

== Overview ==
Some of the remaining and ruined Scottish royal palaces have kitchens, and the halls or chambers where food was served, and rooms where food and tableware were stored. There is an extensive archival record of the 16th-century royal kitchen in the series of households accounts in the National Records of Scotland, known as the Liber Emptorum, the Liber Domicilii and the Despences de la Maison Royale, which are daily records of the purchase of food and drink.

The royal kitchens in the 1530s employed around 60 people. Supplies of food for the royal household were known as "furnishing" and were usually managed by the Masters of the Household. Charles II came to Scotland in 1650 and a new Scottish household was created for him, and an account of food and spices survives for his stay at Falkland, Stirling, and Perth, where he may have stayed in the old Gowrie House.

The household books include many payments for the transport of meat, fish, and cereal products. Such records illustrate the royal itinerary. Much food was transported by boats in the Firth of Forth between Edinburgh, Stirling, and Blackness Castle (the port for Linlithgow Palace). The household books for 1529 record the loss of provisions and barrels of beer from a boat between Leith and Stirling, due to "a great wind from the north by Aberdour". When James IV, and later, James V and Mary of Guise, went hunting to Glen Finglas supplies were sent from Stirling, while the keepers of the hunting forest, the Edmondstones of Duntreath, sourced milk and some provisions locally.

== Kitchens in the royal palaces ==
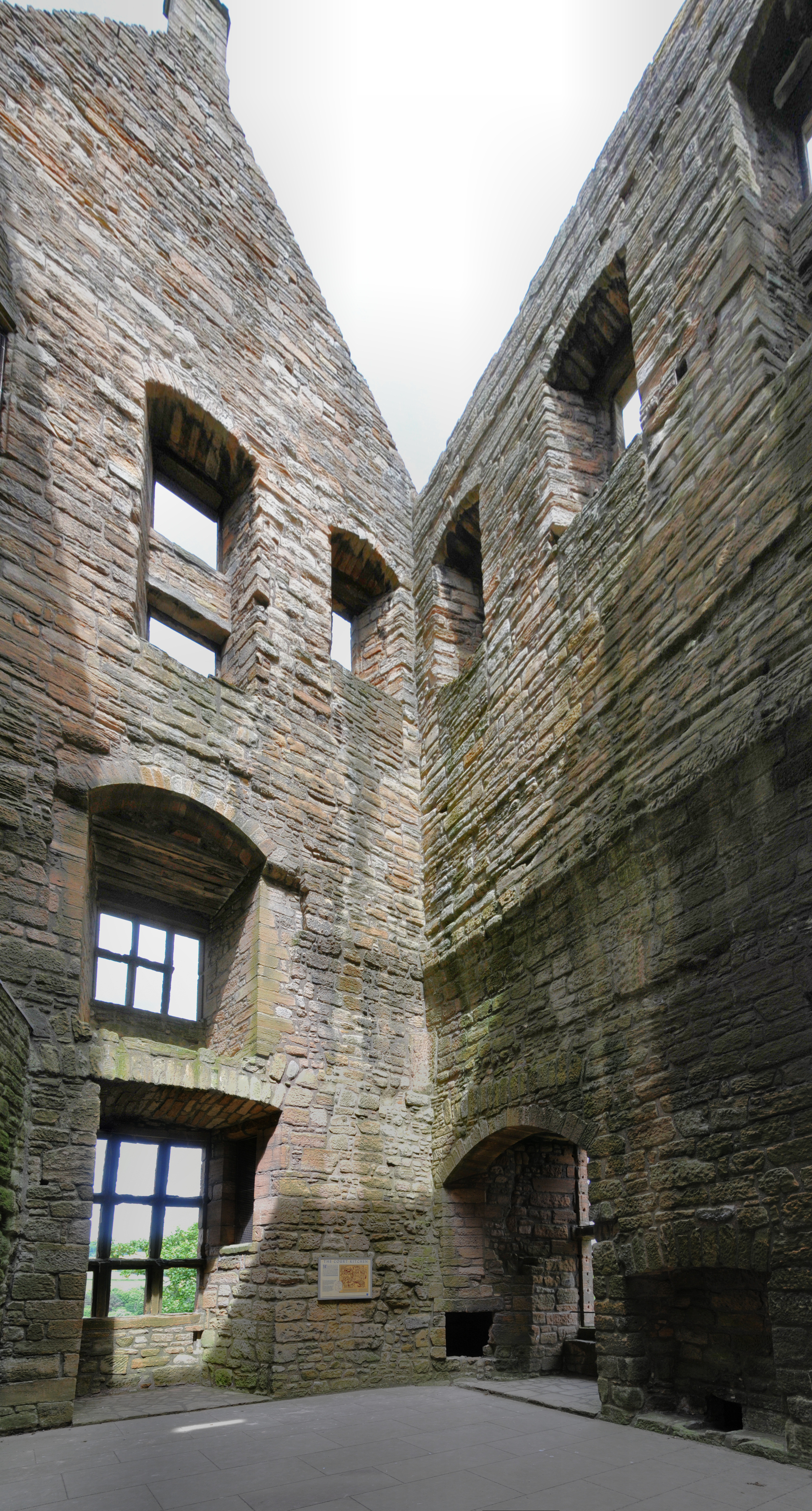
The court kitchen at Linlithgow Palace

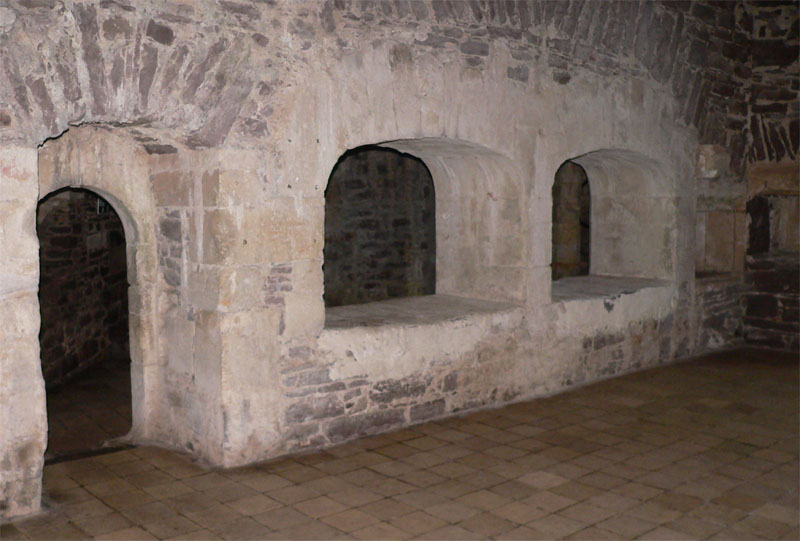
Kitchen servery hatches at Doune Castle

There are no 16th-century inventories of kitchen equipment in the palaces. Much of the equipment was moved when the monarchs progressed between residences. In 1595, an exchequer official John Skene suggested that money could be saved by buying essentials for each palace kitchen rather than carting things around, noting:

To eschew the exorbitant expenses maid upoun the cariage of thair majesties houshald stuff, it war very necessair to buy spetis (spits), raxis (racks), fyre vessell and tin vessell and put the same in Falkland, Stiviling, Linlithgow and Halyrudhous, so many as micht convenientlie furneis and staik thair majesteis keichingis.

There are references in the treasurer's accounts to making furnishings for kitchens, like the chests or "great kists" made for the petty larder and the silver vessel house at Stirling in 1532 made from "Eastland boards". The same carpenters panelled or partitioned a space called the "kitchen dressory" where food was plated up for serving. They made an oak table for the dressory, a frame for the serving hatch, and a chest for dried salmon. Four gardeners improved a kitchen garden and sowed lettuce and thyme.

Two iron frying pans were bought for the king's kitchen in 1525 and new pewter was bought for Christmas, including four chargers for the king's table, and other dishes and English plates. Murdo Stirling, pâtissier for Mary of Guise, bought four waffle irons in March 1539, and in June 1540 supervised the installation of ovens in the king's ships, including the Salamander for a voyage to Orkney.

A new stone oven at Holyrood Palace in 1532 had a floor made of specially selected tufa stone from North Berwick. The roof of kitchen was provided with a louvre for ventilation, resembling a beehive, an "aiphous in the heid of the samen for the mair vent". Mary, Queen of Scots, had coal brought from Wallyford for the fires in her own apartments, possibly the kitchen ovens were fuelled with wood and charcoal. In 1505 James IV granted lands at Bonnington including a coal pit to his master cook Thomas Schaw, who was expected to deliver coal to Linlithgow Palace.

Some kitchen equipment was included in an inventory of artillery at Edinburgh Castle in March 1567. It may represent a kitchen within an older Kitchen Tower then serving the castle gunners. There was an iron brander or grid-iron, two iron racks, two spits, and two dressing board tables. In the new bakehouse there was baking board, a storage girnel, and a trough. There were hand-mills for grinding wheat in a cellar. A brewhouse contained a "masking vat", a kettle, a "gyle" vat, and a "cumming", which was a vessel used in brewhouses. Similarly named items appear in the inventories of other Scottish houses and castles.

More kitchenalia was detailed in a 1562 inventory of the Earl of Moray, the half-brother of Mary, Queen of Scots, including; skimming ladles, frying pans, goose pans, roasting irons, pestles and mortars, a block stock and a flesh (meat) stock, dressing knives, a coal rake, and pewter plates and vessels.

=== Stewart silver ===
James V had various items of silver and silver gilt plate for the table and for display on the cupboard in hall. In 1531 he acquired a quantity of silver plate from Nicholas Cannavett or Canivet, French comptroller of Dunbar, including two square trenchers with salt containers in the corner. These were in Edinburgh Castle in 1543 with other treasures like a silver cup said to have belonged to Robert the Bruce. Mary, Queen of Scots took silverware engraved with the royal arms on her ship to France in 1548 for the cuisine de bouche. James V had two silver gilt ships or nefs for the table, his grandson James VI sent them for repair by a Canongate goldsmith James Acheson in 1602.

Some of the family silver was melted down by Regent Moray in 1567. James VI acquired a cup fashioned from an ostrich egg mounted in silver in 1589. In October 1590 the master of the wine cellar Jerome Bowie and the master of household Andrew Melville made an inventory of old and new silver kept in the cuphouse with the pieces held for daily use by Francis Galbraith in the king's pantry.

=== Linlithgow Palace ===
The kitchens at Linlithgow Palace are on three levels within the tower at the north end of the Great Hall. They were modified in 1464, 1470–1, and 1539. Some alterations were occasioned by subsidence. The court kitchen is adjacent to the Great Hall. The room next door was probably the spice house. In August 1539 James Hamilton of Finnart was paid for rebuilding the king's kitchen with a fireplace, an oven, and a room for silver vessels, and another for keeping coal. There is a well in the lower "laich" kitchen.

The wine cellar is under the royal lodgings on the west side. A carved stone corbel depicts a figure drinking. The palace museum has an eel fork used to catch eels in the loch.

=== Stirling Castle ===
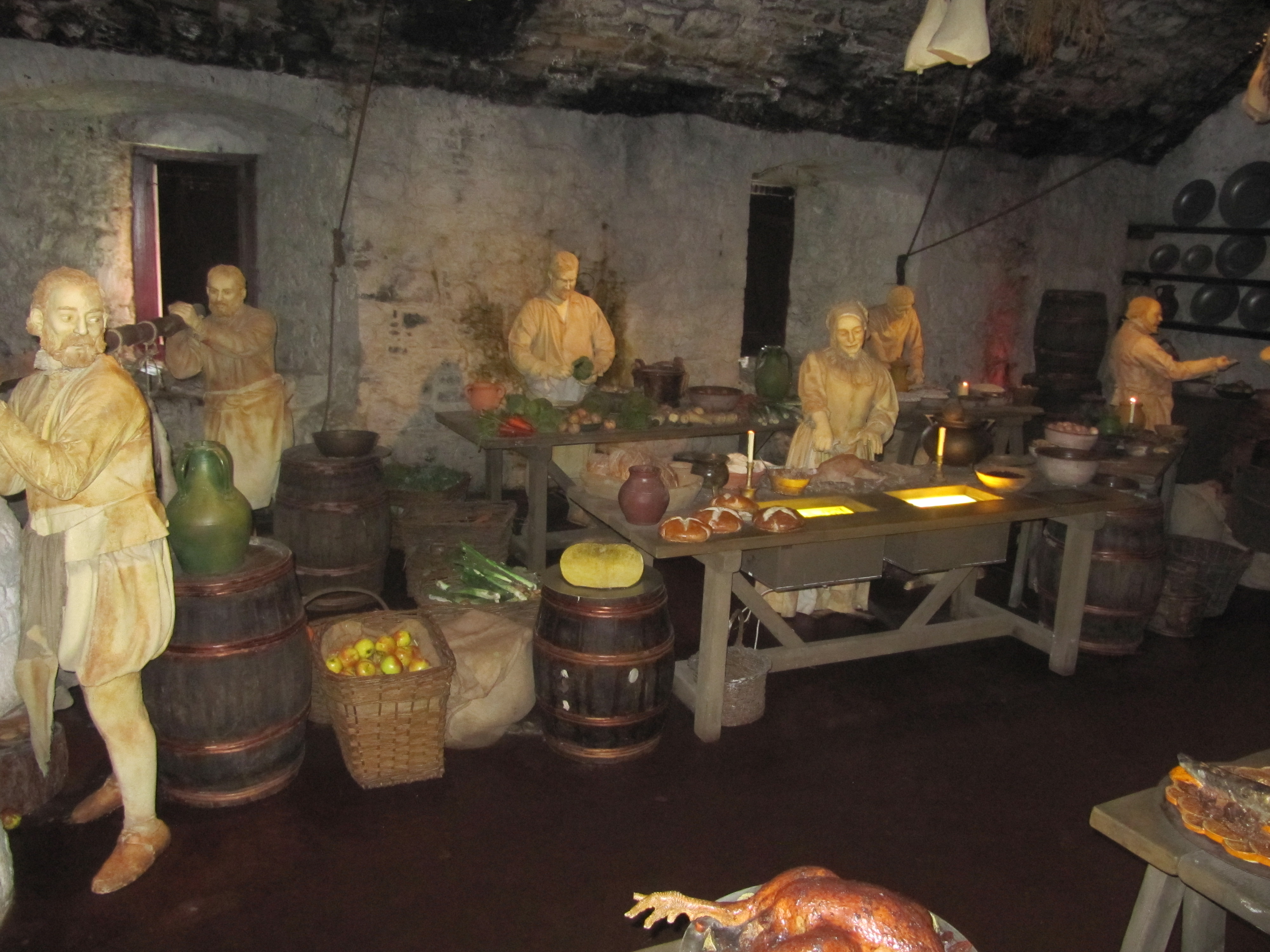
The kitchen display at Stirling Castle

Vaulted cellars which served as a kitchen at Stirling Castle were discovered in 1920. This included a bakehouse and larder for bread. There was a kitchen space and a "dressory" for the preparation of food. These preparation spaces open into a corridor which probably linked to the hall. Another, separate, kitchen was provided for James IV in his lodging now known as the King's Old Building, and there was a "petty larder", pantry, and wine cellar. James V and Mary of Guise had kitchens in the cellar of the new Palace. During the baptism of James VI, Lord Darnley's meals were supplied from the Queen's kitchen rather than the main kitchen. The location of the castle brew house has not been discovered.

In 1533 a priest James Nicholson was in charge of the building fabric at Stirling, and he also fed cranes, herons, peacocks, and bitterns for the king's table. In March 1558 a carpenter Sandy Lawson made a cupboard for Mary of Guise's kitchen called a "gardemange", and a mason, Alexander Loverance, built a passageway from the queen's kitchen to a stairway.

James V distributed clothes and food to poor people on or around his birthday. In September 1533 poor people in Stirling received west sea herrings and beer. Rabbit warrens at Stirling near the Royal Park, attested by the names Coneyhill and Kenningknows, ponds for fish and birds, and later, a dovecote would provide food and also add to the Stewart's image of wealth, abundance, and prestige.

James VI was brought up at Stirling as a child. The accounts mention that William Brocas and Alexander Ferguson kept the ovens alight in the castle kitchen. Brocas was the king's fire-man, in charge of ovens and hearths. Brocas and John Murray were paid for maintaining the fire in the king's bedchamber.

=== Food archaeology at Stirling Castle ===
Archaeological finds of animal bone at Stirling Castle from the 16th century include cat bones, cattle, goat, horse, pig, red deer, roe deer, and sheep. Cattle and sheep bones dominated the finds. The cattle were mostly at least two to three years, the finds indicating that the cattle and sheep had been farmed for meat. Finds from the 1594 Chapel Royal site were the bone of animals butchered elsewhere, while the deer had been brought to the castle complete. The finds of bones from whole deer are compatible with the archival record of food gifts. Herring, cod, pollack, coal-fish (saithe) and other fish bones were present, including some freshwater fish. Shellfish included oysters and mussels. Delicacies mentioned in the archival record, like roasted baby (boneless) rabbit are unlikely to be leave a trace in the archaeology. Plant and cereal remains included oats, barley, wheat, and rye. Some seeds of pulses, turnip, cabbage and mustard, were possibly incorporated in a condiment. Fruit was represented by a plum stone. A hazelnut shell may have been part of meal. Traces of plants perhaps categorized as weeds, hemlock and henbane, may have been incorporated in medicines. Rushes were used on the floor. More evidence for the castle diet in future may be found with the careful excavation and examination of cesspit deposits.

Some writers describe a prejudice against eating pork in Scotland, perhaps among rural populations. However, evidence for this is slight or lacking.

=== Dunfermline Palace ===
At Dunfermline Palace some remains of a kitchen can be seen which served both the hall of the royal lodging and the monastic refectory in the 15th century. There are also remains of a second kitchen serving the royal lodgings.

=== Falkland Palace ===
At Falkland Palace there was a kitchen to serve the demolished great hall at the garden end of the ruined east quarter. A bakehouse in a cellar kitchen area at the east tower has a service stair accessing the first floor royal lodgings in the east quarter at the other end. Another kitchen in the gatehouse tower served the keeper's lodging.

Accounts survive for Charles II's stay in July 1650. His food was seasoned with saffron, nutmeg, cinnamon, cloves, and ginger. Every tart provided for the king's table had a pound of sugar, while tarts for lesser courtiers required only half a pound. A servant of the king's tailor was discovered to have taken one of the royal napkins and unpicked the embroidered initials.

=== Holyrood Palace ===
Although the old kitchens and Great Hall of Holyrood Palace have been demolished, the supper room, an intimate space in the royal bedchamber, where Mary, Queen of Scots dined with David Rizzio can still be seen. The day after the death of Lord Darnley at the Kirk o' Field, the servant known as "French Paris" came to queen's bedchamber to hang her bed with mourning black and light candles. A lady in waiting, Marie, Lady Seton gave him a fried egg for his breakfast, presumably prepared on a fireplace in the royal suite.

== A banquet for the arrival of Mary of Gueldres ==
Mary of Guelders married James II of Scotland in 1449. After a tournament in Bruges, she travelled to Scotland. A banquet at Holyrood Abbey following the wedding was described by a chronicle writer Mathieu d'Escouchy. A stuffed boar was brought in, decorated with Scottish heraldry, and the stuffing was alight. An impressive and realistic silver ship was brought to the table (these silver ships called "nefs" feature in later royal inventories), and the Earl of Orkney and four knights entered the hall to preside over the service of food.

== Reception for Margaret Tudor at Holyrood ==
An English herald, John Young, wrote about etiquette and seating arrangements at meals during the reception of Margaret Tudor at Holyrood in 1503. He mentions some dishes at the dinner following her wedding on 8 August. The first course involved a gilded boar's head on a platter, a fair piece of brawn, and gammon ham. Apart from these delicacies, Young does not specify other foods. The ingredients of brawn, calf's head and jelly or aspic are frequently mentioned in later Scottish royal household books.

A menu for the whole banquet survives, copied into a London chronicle. It lists the same three opening dishes of the first course as, "The Borys head solemnly shedd, Sheydis & Rondis of Braun with mustard, Gambonys of Bacon with pestellys of pork". Desserts were served with "custard royall". Spiced "Hippocras" wine was made by the apothecary, John Mosman. Dishes included solan geese with sauce, baked apples and pears, and jelly moulded with the arms of England and Scotland.

== The Earl of Atholl's banquet in Glen Tilt ==
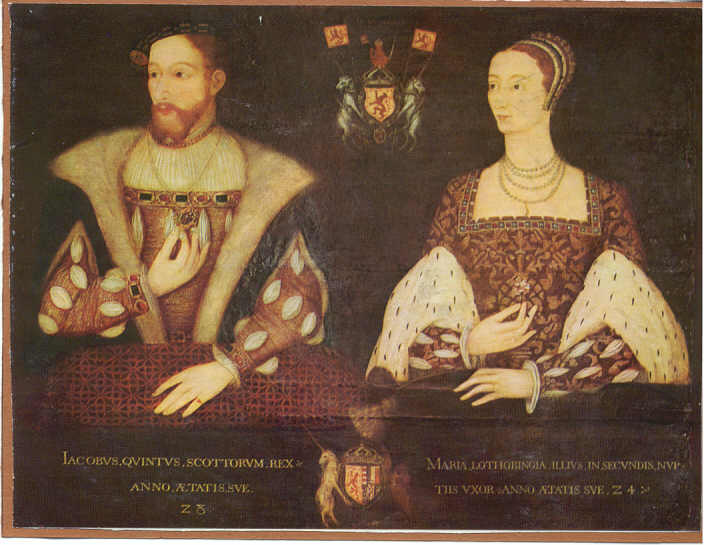
Double portrait of James V and Mary of Guise, Falkland Palace

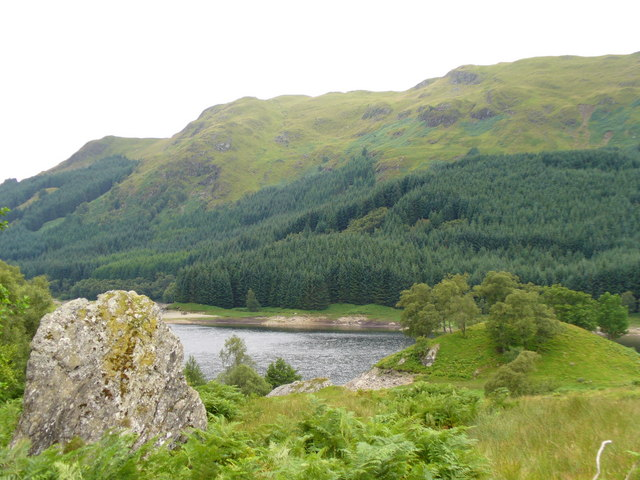
James V and Mary of Guise came to Glen Finglas together in August 1538. She left first.

A chronicle written by Robert Lindsay of Pitscottie in the 1570s describes a banquet prepared by the Earl of Atholl for James V to impress a Papal ambassador. This event seems to have taken place in 1532 in a temporary wooden lodge built like a castle in Glen Tilt near Pitlochry. The banquet, as represented by Pitscottie, included:

all manner of meats (foods), drinks, delicacies that was to be gotten at that time in all Scotland either in burgh or in land that might be gotten for money; that is to say, all kind of drink, as ale, beer, wine, both white wine and claret, malvassy, musticat and allicant, inchethrist (or hippocras) and aqua vitae. Further, there was of meats, of bread, white bread main breid and gingerbread, with fleshes (meats), beef, mutton, lamb, cunning (rabbit), crane, swan, wild goose, partridge and plover, duck, "brissill cock" (turkeys) and powins (peacocks) together with black cock and moor fowl and capercaillies and also the stanks (moat) that was round about the palace was sowmond (stocked) full of all delicate fishes, as salmon, trout and perches, pikes and eels and all other kind of delicate fishes that could be gotten in fresh waters was all ready to be prepared for the banquet. Since was there proper stewards and cunning bakers and also excellent cooks and pattisiers with confections and drugs for their desserts.

There are records of several other hunting royal trips. Much of the food was brought from elsewhere. Since the 15th century there was a Hunt Hall in Glen Finglas to accommodate the royal party. James IV came to the Hunt Hall in July 1492. In August 1505 he was supplied with dairy goods by two women from Duntreath, and eels and pikes from the Lake of Menteith. In August 1538 James V and Mary of Guise, with six ladies in waiting, went to Glen Finglas, bringing provisions bought in Stirling.

James V stayed at Cultybraggan near Comrie to hunt deer in September 1532, bringing bread, ale, and fish from Stirling. He frequently hunted in Glen Artney. In August 1563, James Stewart built a new Hunt Hall for Mary, Queen of Scots at Glen Artney in Perthshire, near Comrie, following an order from the Comptroller of Scotland, John Wishart of Pitarrow. Mary, Queen of Scots spent three days in Glen Finglas in September 1563.

== The archival record ==
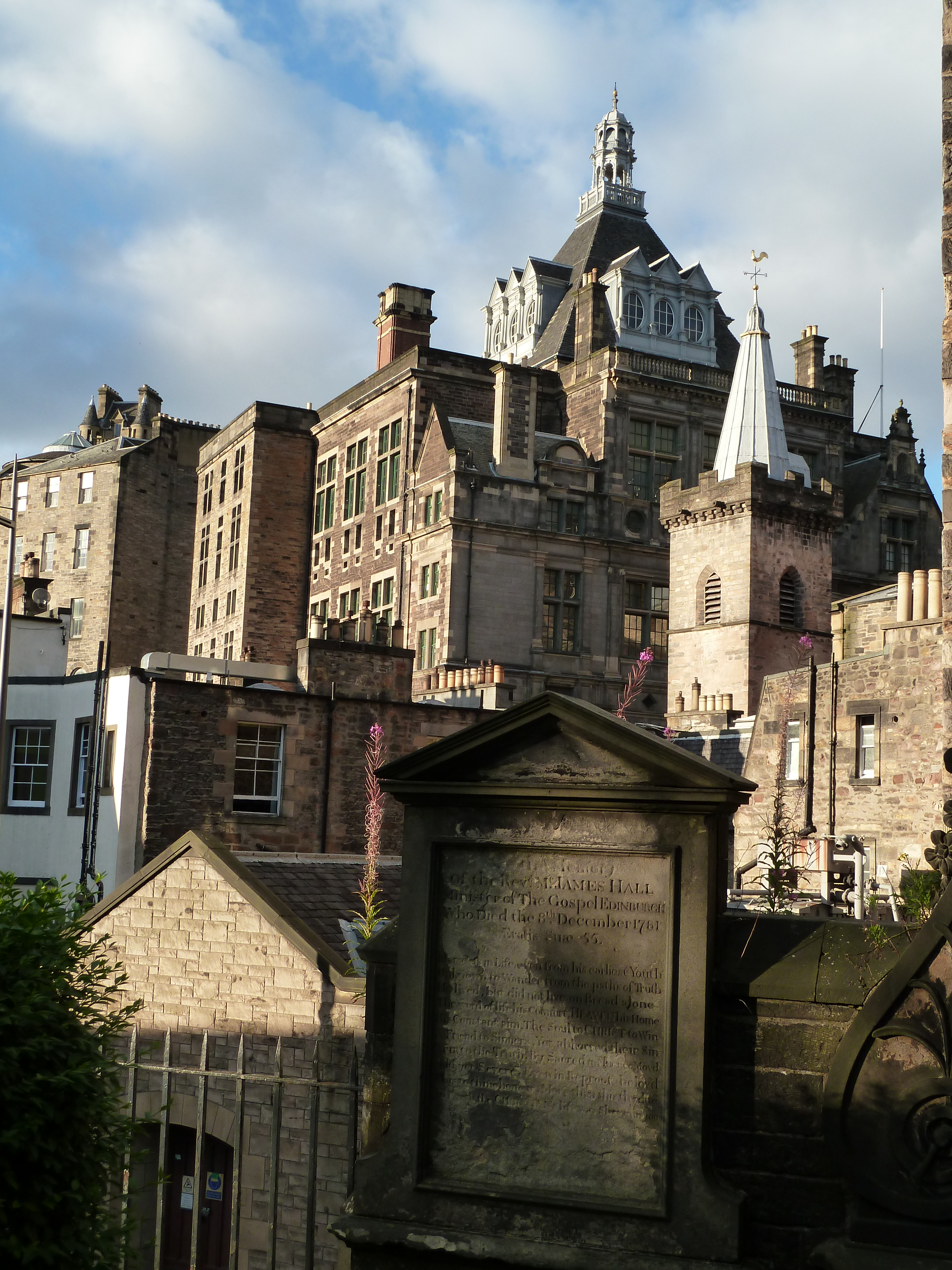
Profits made by Michael MacQueen and Janet Rynd from the spice trade built the tower of the Magdalen Chapel in Edinburgh

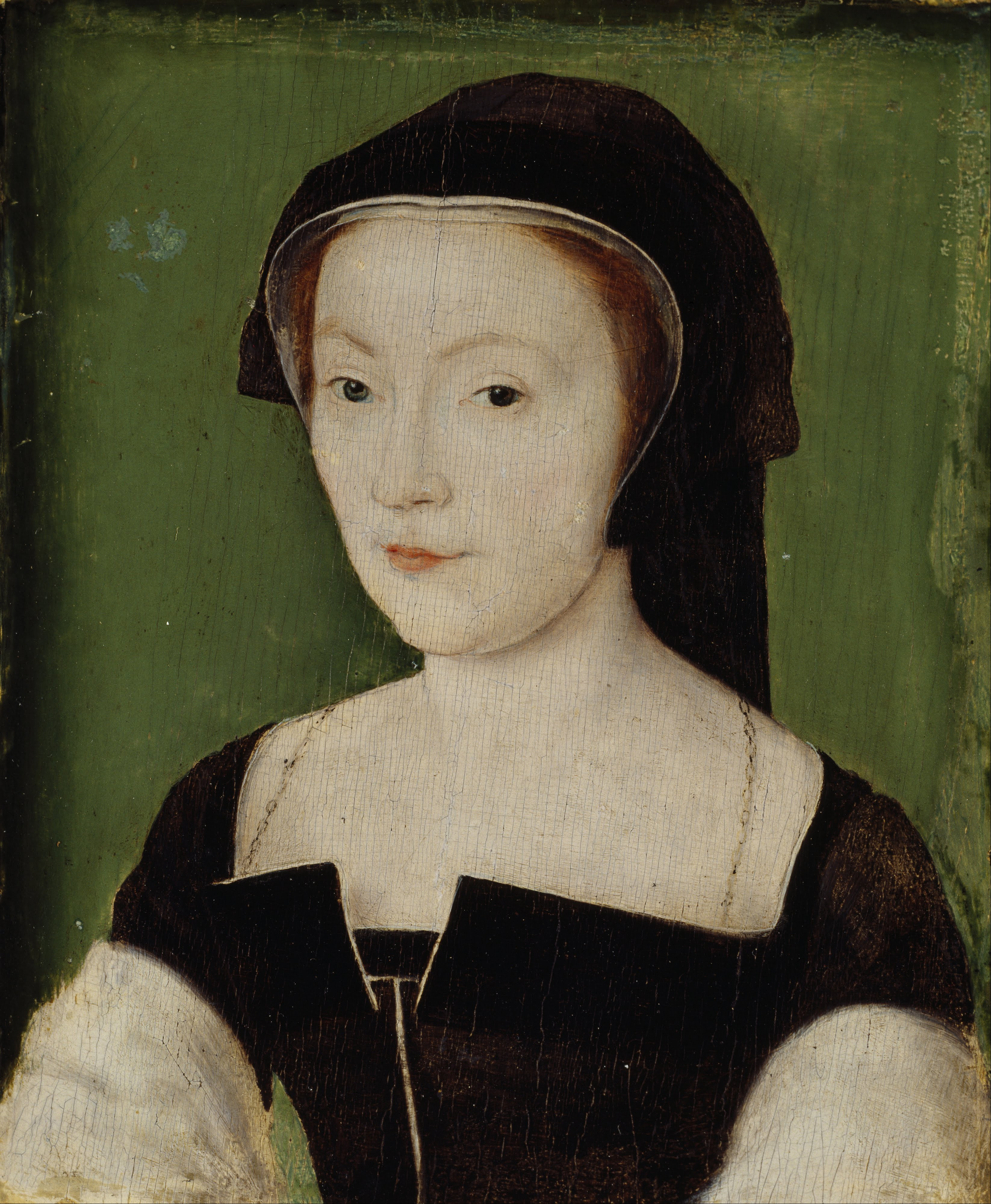
Mary of Guise enjoyed a French style pasty of pigs trotters à la sauce Madame during a trip to Falkland Palace in January 1540

=== Workers and wages ===
Wages and fees for servants in the royal kitchen can be found in the accounts of the comptroller, published as the Exchequer Rolls, which include some food purchases. For instance, James IV provided a ship for Perkin Warbeck's servants with mutton, barrels of salmon and herring, and dried cod. Around the same time, James IV's officers sold fleeces, mutton and sheep intestines. Almost all the named kitchen workers were men, except the linen laundress, Margaret Musche in 1496.

James IV kept a separate household from his wife Margaret Tudor with two kitchens, the master cook of his court kitchen was Thomas Schaw, and the master cook of the king's kitchen was William Arth. Each kitchen had yeoman and junior "groom cooks", and two "turnbroches" who tended the fires and turned spits. He also employed brewers and bakers. James V's master cook was Thomas Marshall (and he continued to work for Mary of Guise), his pastry chef Murdo Striveling bought wafer irons for Mary of Guise in February 1539.

The kitchen servants of James VI in 1593 included, paid 100 merks yearly; Francis Galbraith, master of the king's pantry; George Bog, master in the king's ale cellar; Jerome Bowie, master in the wine cellar; Patrick Rannald, baker; Walter Neisch, master in the larder; Cristell Lamb, master cook. Paid £50 yearly; James Murray, master cook of the court kitchen; James Bog, first aid (help) in ale cellar; James Quhyte or White, first aid in the wine cellar; Robert Galbraith, first aid in the pantry, Margaret Duchall (wife of Jerome Bowie) launderer of the king's linen cloths; Andrew Seton, foreman in the court kitchen. Paid £10 yearly; James Liddal, aid to the pastry cook; John Buchanan, aid to the pantry (Margaret Hartsyde married a John Buchanan); Robert Brown, aid in the wine cellar; Gilbert Seton, aid in the court kitchen; William Murray, aid in the tin (pewter) vessel house; Duncan Neisch and Thomas Scott, aids in the larder. This does include Anne of Denmark's kitchen staff.

=== Household books and purchasing ===
The treasurer's accounts of James IV include payments for spices, including cinnamon, cloves, mace, nutmeg, saffron, and sugar.

Food for the royal household and others, including a garrison and workers on Inchgarvie, are mentioned in the treasurer's accounts. Another branch of royal finance, recorded as the Exchequer Roll series includes references to food, and some food was supplied as rent and feudal duty. Most food purchasing, from merchants, or suppliers known as "furnishers" were recorded in household books. The exchequer rolls for 1507 record two swans costing 12 shillings bought for a feast, a purchase omitted by mistake from the household books. Household books from the reign of James IV in 1511 until the end of the rule of the Earl of Arran as Regent in 1553 survive in the National Archives of Scotland in two series, known as the Liber Domicilli (NRS E31) and Liber Emptorum (NRS E32). These are written in Latin. The two series duplicate daily summaries of food purchases. The Liber Emptorum books also contain lists of extra purchases called "uncosts", including cord to hang poultry in the larder. James IV held a banquet for Christmas 1511, inviting a French ambassador. Lamb, piglets, quail, plovers, snipe, with young rabbits and a large quantity of calves' foot jelly were served. James IV also held banquets on his newly built ships, including the Margaret, at Leith or Newhaven close to Edinburgh. There was an Easter banquet at Linlithgow Palace on 11 April 1512. One surviving household book is written in Scots, detailing meals at Linlithgow Palace when the infant James V remained there in 1512. The two oldest account books were compiled for the Bishop of Caithness, who seems to have accounted for the two households of James IV and his queen consort Margaret Tudor. The Bishop bought or collected herring and ling from Lewis, and sold a surplus of fish to merchants in Flanders.

An extract from the household books giving an idea of the diet of James V in his minority and the early years of his reign was published in 1836. Each day the whereabouts and movements of the monarch were noted. These records have often been consulted by historians and cited for the royal itineraries and significant dates. For instance, on 11 June 1533 James V went on pilgrimage to the shrine of St Ninian at Whithorn for a week, riding first to Glasgow, while most of the household remained at Stirling Castle. On 4 August 1536 James V arrived by ship at Whithorn at night and rode to Stirling, recorded as "Ista nocte dominus rex rediit de navibus apud Candidam Casam et equitavit versus Stirling". On 1 March 1539 James was in Edinburgh, and attended the trial and burning of men accused of heresy following the performance of a Passion Play at Stirling, "Accusatio haereticorum et eorum combustio apud Edinburgh. Rege presente". The king's itinerary for 1538 taken from the household books has been published.

The exchequer rolls were the responsibility of the comptroller. One unlucky comptroller of the exchequer, James Colville was sacked in 1538 and charged with treason for his friendship with the Douglas family. He was made personally responsible for £879 worth of wax, spice, and other goods supplied to the household by an Edinburgh merchant, William Tod. The next comptroller, David Wood of Craig, was promoted from Master of King's Larder. Wood noted that suppliers could, "if their conscience would serve them", claim payment several times over, as the royal accounts were kept in such in a way that payments were not recorded.

The household books include provisions bought for hunting trips, wedding feasts (for the daughters of Regent Arran), banquets on the Great Michael, table linen, soap for its laundry, and the swaddling clothes of royal infants. As well as regular meals, sometimes the monarch had afternoon drinks, especially in the hunting field. Occasional expenses include ferry boats and transport. Ginger and pepper, and linen for the cook, were supplied to James V by Michael McQueen, who with his wife Janet Rynd founded the Magdalen Chapel in Edinburgh's Cowgate.

Meat included salted Orkney beef, mutton, calves' heads, and ox feet. Lamb's intestines bought for a feast at St Andrews to welcome Mary of Guise to Scotland were probably used to prepare a form of haggis. A wide variety of fish and sea food was served including mackerel, Loch Fyne herring, conger eel, dried whitings, whale and porpoise. Poultry and birds included moor hens, dotterel, swans, quails and capercaillie. Rabbits were supplied from warrens at Dunbar and baked baby rabbit was a delicacy. Rabbits from Dunbar were supplied as a feudal duty and recorded in the Exchequer Rolls. The supply was halved by 1589, when the west link warren was destroyed by the sea and wind-blown sand.

Friday was a fish day. The clerks noted several days in the year as feast days of saints. Claret, tavern ale, and imported German beer feature. James V was supplied by the ale wives of North Berwick on his visits to Tantallon Castle. When Regent Arran visited Craignethan Castle with Henri Cleutin wine and beer was supplied by taverns in Lanark. Food gifts are noted in the uncost section with rewards given to the servants of the donors. Food gifts were made by higher status courtiers, landowners, and churchmen. Rewards were given their servants and the nature of the foodstuff was frequently recorded.

At Easter 1526, when he was 14, James V distributed ale and 14 loaves to poor people in Edinburgh. James V's cooks from 1525 were Hugh Johnston and Walter Gardener. In April 1533 Thomas Marschall was in charge of shopping during the king's visit to Perth, and was subsequently described as head cook.

A few pages which head sections of the accounts have illustrations or doodles including a unicorn, a thistle and rose, Lucretia, and figure of a man with a tent or pavilion, with the motto "spes fove". The motto was also used by Robert Denniston or Danielstoun, rector of Dysart, whose brother William Danielstoun was keeper of Linlithgow Palace.

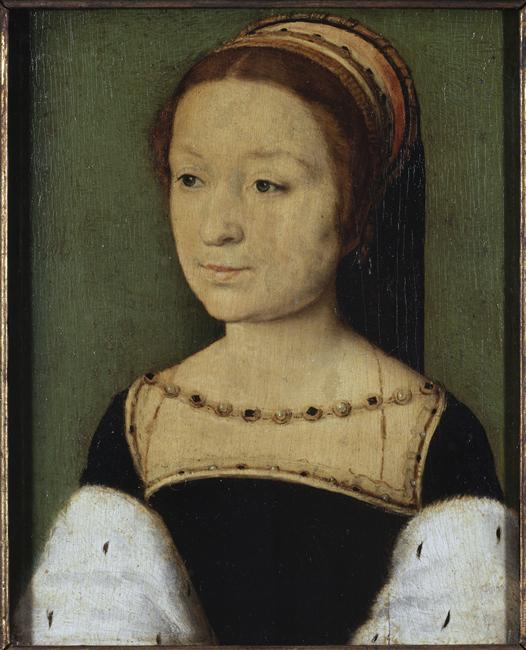
James V returned from a trip to France with Madeleine of Valois and 1762 pounds of salted lard

When James V returned from France with Madeleine of Valois, he bought barrels of olive oil and verjuice, claret and white wine, and no less than 1762 pounds of salted lard, as a commitment to embrace French cuisine. In July 1537 Madeleine was ill at Holyrood, it was said by English spies that the king "doth keep so small an house that there is but only six messes of meat allowed in his house". A number of Scottish food words are borrowed from French, and examples from a list of loan words tabulated by the historian William Tytler in 1790 are frequently cited.

== Food gifts ==
An account of the pursemaster of James V in 1539 in 1540 includes rewards given to servants who brought food gifts. Henry Wardlaw of Kilbaberton sent a boar and Lady Erskine sent him lampreys. Wild geese were frequently given. When the king and Mary of Guise were at Ravenscraig Castle they ate pikes and eels from Loch Leven, and the Earl of Huntly brought aqua vitae and venison to Falkland. James V also ate pike from the Lake of Menteith and bream from Lochmaben. The monks of Lindores Abbey sent apples and rosewater. The boars were described as "fed bare" meaning domesticated. James V's favourite, Oliver Sinclair, brought 196 Dunbar rabbits for Christmas 1539.

Food gifts are also recorded in the fragmentary royal household books from the 1590s. Gifts of food were also presented to Mary's Comptroller, John Wishart of Pitarrow. In 1564, these included malmsey wine, pears, oranges, and aqua vitae.

== Regent Arran's household books ==
After the death of James V, James Hamilton, 3rd Earl of Arran, became Regent. He continued to pay wages and give livery clothes to a number of cooks and kitchen servants who had worked for the late king. His clerks kept daily household books in Latin, similar to those of James V, with an expanded duplicate, the Liber Emptorum including miscellaneous purchases made in each month. Regent Arran's itinerary for 1542 to 1548 taken from the daily headings of these household books was printed in the corresponding edition of the Register of the Privy Seal of Scotland in 1936.

The household books include banquets given by Regent Arran for his daughter's wedding in Edinburgh, Barbara Hamilton married Alexander Gordon, Master of Huntly, on 3 August 1549, and for the wedding of Isobel Hamilton and George Seton, 7th Lord Seton on 12 August 1550. Arran entertained diplomats, and had a meal at Craignethan Castle with Henri Cleutin in 1550. In March 1549 whales beached at or near Cramond Island were salted and packed in barrels. Regent Arran had four barrels sent to Seton Palace, (he was building a fort at Luffness). Some whale oil was bought for use at Edinburgh Castle. Beached whales were a valuable property, and in 1597 Andrew Balfour of Montquhanie feuded with the Earl of Orkney over rights of wreck at Westray.

At the conclusion of the war known as the Rough Wooing, on 21 May 1550, Regent Arran hosted a banquet in his Edinburgh lodging for Mary of Guise's brother, Claude, Marquis de Mayenne, who had been a hostage in England for the peace negotiations. The banqueting hall was decorated with the royal tapestry, benches and stools were upholstered with green cloth and purple velvet by John Frog, and a new outfit in black wool and velvet was bought for Elizabeth Murray, who served or performed at the feast.

=== Latin names for meat and fish in the household accounts ===
The household books carefully detail purchases of meat, fish, wild fowl and poultry, cereals, and ale. The vocabulary is similar to the later form of Latin found in other medieval European account books. The precise identity of the species or crop may be difficult to identify in modern terms. Some words, especially those for fish and marine animals, seem to be the invention of the clerks. In 1836, John Fleming of the University of Aberdeen made a glossary of some recurring terms. West coast herrings are aleca occidentalia; flounders seem to be bronoscopi; the woodcock is gallus silvestris; river trout were trute torrentium; pewter dishes are parapsides stanee; napkins are manutergia.

== Mary of Guise ==
A record of expenses exists for Mary of Guise and Mary, Queen of Scots, written in French, and known as the Despences de la Maison Royale. At this time, she paid for the food of her household from her own income rather than from her husband's revenues. The record has also been consulted for the royal itinerary. Typically, the manuscript shows that on Sunday 9 January 1540 Mary of Guise had dinner at Burleigh Castle and supper at Falkland Palace. Beef, mutton, goose, plovers and partridges were on the menu at dinner, and at Falkland, there was beef, mutton, pork, poultry and rabbit. The pastry cook made partridge pie, a pasty of pig's trotters à la sauce Madame, and craquelin. Dishes made for the common table were also listed, including plate-pasties.

During a political controversy in July 1543, Mary of Guise and Mary, Queen of Scots, moved from Linlithgow Palace to Stirling Castle. The Despences include some details, nineteen horses were used to move the contents of the great larder, the kitchen utensils, the wine cellar, bakehouse, and the coffers of the bread pantry. A contract and a couple of letters from 1548 show that Mary of Guise bought foodstuffs from a Rouen merchant, Arnault de Sollanoue. After visiting Guise at Stirling Castle and making a deal in October 1547, Arnault shipped wine, peas, beans, figs, capers, onions, verjuice, and lard to the west of Scotland, probably Dumbarton. Arnault was to be paid by the treasurer of Guise's French estate and incomes.

A "Bread book" from 1549, during the years before Mary of Guise became Regent, records allowances of bread for her courtiers and household. The Bread book mentions people called the "Morys", perhaps servants of African origin or the captured Spanish cavalrymen mentioned by Lady Home in her letter of 28 March 1549. Lady Home wrote to Mary of Guise "to be a good princess" to the "Moor" and the Spanish soldiers. The baker broke his arm in 1552. Her cook, Thomas Merschell, made a will in October 1557 before joining the army sent to the English border.

== Mary, Queen of Scots ==
Mary's master cook in France was Hussone Martin. His name was recorded as a witness to a baptism at Châteaudun in December 1556. One of her master cooks, Nicholas Boindreid or Lavener, had a relationship with a woman called Bessy Brown in the Canongate in 1564, attracting the attention of the Kirk Session. Mary's French pantry man was Jerbault alias Marte Mannot. David Kinloch was Mary's master baker or "baxter" and had also worked for her mother. James Mershell was clerk and keeper of the queen's larder or "lardner", assisted by Robert Kemp. Merschell and Kemp kept accounts of produce including poultry delivered to the royal kitchen as feudal rents.

After the Scottish Reformation, from 1561, some of the expenses of the royal household in Scotland were met by "thirds of benefices" collected from teinds. Much of the food produce collected in this manner was sold, and wine and cheese was bought with the proceeds, but some wheat was sent directly to Mary, Queen of Scot's bakers and oats were taken by the master of avery, who fed the queen's horses. John Huntar kept sheep and cattle in Holyrood Park to feed the household.

Alexander Carpentyne or Carpenter was Mary's chief brewer. He had worked for Mary's mother, Mary of Guise, and was replaced in 1566 by Patrick Crombie. Crombie was described as brewer to the King and Queen.

French wine was imported to Leith, purchased by her household officers from merchants including Alexander Park, and delivered to her sommeliers Vincent Dido and William Henderson. Some of barrels were carried to Holyrood suspended from a pole on the shoulders of porters, a method described as "sting and ling". Varieties included Bordeaux, Vin de Graves, and "scherand wyne" sourced in the Gironde.

Meat for the household at Holyrood was supplied by butchers in Edinburgh. They were known as "fleshers". £700 Scots was paid to John Hunter, Harry Burrell, and Rolland Gardinar for meat in 1564. Robert Henderson had an annual fee of £10 Scots as the queen's butcher.

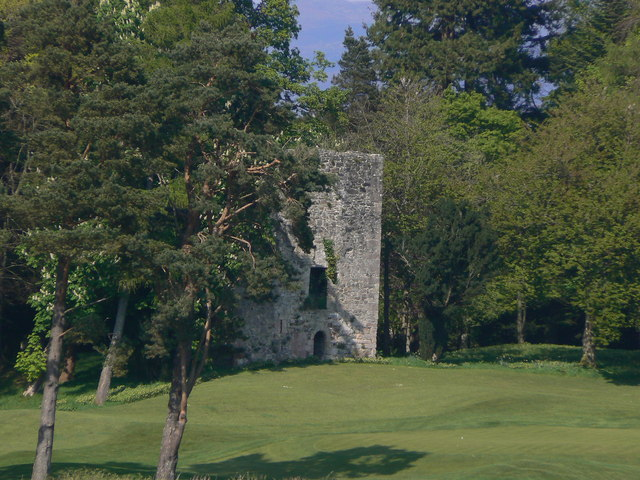
Mary, Queen of Scots and her household enjoyed a fish supper at Rossdhu Castle on the banks of Loch Lomond on 17 July 1563

When Mary visited Rossdhu and Dumbarton Castle in July 1563, fish was served on Saturday 17 July, including two salted salmon, two salted ling, 50 trout, and 36 plaice, cooked in 16 pounds of butter. The household book was checked and signed by her French former comptroller and master of household, Bartholomew de Villemore. Her argentar and household "furnisher" Alexander Durham collected a contribution of £124-10s-8d in August 1564 from Coupar Angus Abbey towards the expenses of a hunting trip to Glen Tilt, where her father James V had been banquetted.

For a few days in 1566, Mary resided in Edinburgh in a house in the Cowgate, where the Court of Exchequer held its business. The circumstances were included by George Buchanan in his Dectectioun. The Latin Exchequer Rolls mention that she and her nobles were provided with wine, bread, beer, meat fish, spices, pewter, and napkins.

=== Mary's menu ===
The "menu" was a household accounting document which listed the food allocations due to the several tables where courtiers and servants took their meals, and does not list the components of dishes in detail. The surviving examples are often found with household rolls giving the names of courtiers. The seating was in a strict hierarchy and some servants were allowed the leftovers or "rests" allocated to courtiers' tables.

A menu was drawn up for Mary's household in 1562. This was just before the departure of Mademoiselles Pinguillon and Fontpertuis and noted that the budget for the table for the queen's gentlewomen could be reduced after they returned to France. A typical entry referring to allowances of wine names several members of the Queen's household:

Table des filles damoiselles ou mangeront
Madamoiselle de la souche governante desd. filles la jeune leviston, grisel, thire, chou, la jeune bethon, La sauvaige, Et Rallay, qui sont viii personnes auront par jour chacune parte de vin reserve La sauvaige qui n'aura que choppine par jour, cy; vin iii quartes parte choppine.

For the table where the maids eat
Mlle de la Souche governess of the said maids, the young Livingstone, Grisel, Thire (possibly Nicolas Wardlaw), Chou, the young Beaton (Lucretia Beaton, later Lady Melgund), the "savage", and Rallay, who are 8 persons each having wine daily, except the "savage" who only has a half pint (a chopin), that is; wine 3 quarts, and half pint.

The woman named "Chou" was probably a relative of an aid in the kitchen Nicolas Chou, and "la Sauvaige" may have been a relative of Adrian Sauvaige, an aid to the keeper of vessels. As French speakers in this period sometimes referred to Highland people as savages, "la sauvaige" may have been a kind of nickname. Mademoiselle de la Souche was still the governess of the maidens in 1567.

=== Marmalade and cotignac ===
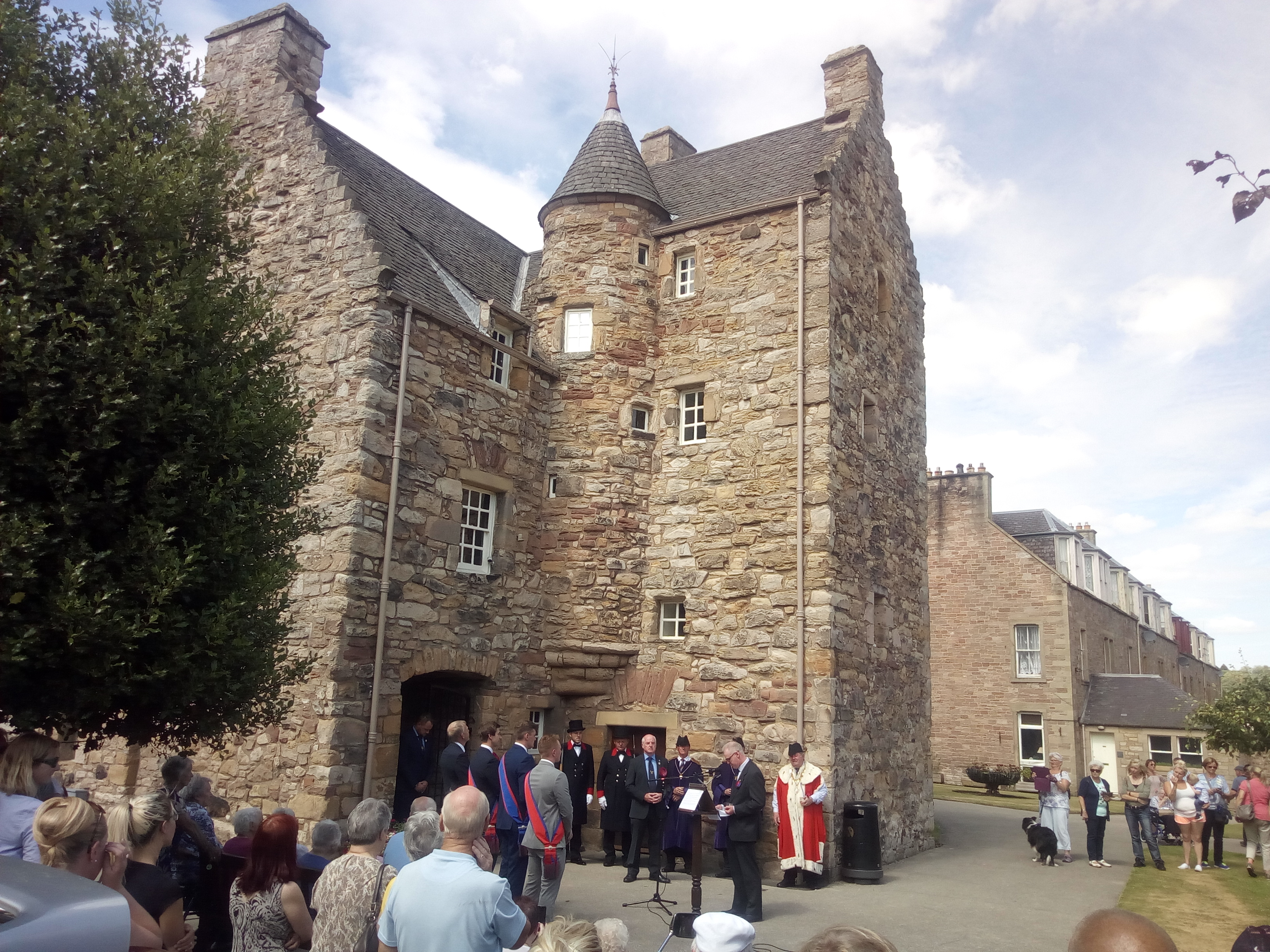
Fruit was brought for Mary at Queen Mary's House, Jedburgh

The word "marmalade" does not derive from a combination of the words "Mary" and "malade", as is sometimes claimed, but from a Portuguese word for the quince. A Portuguese quince paste was called marmelado. Mary certainly enjoyed and made a quince preserve called "cotignac" in France and "marmalade" in Scotland, as recorded in the accounts of the French royal children's household for 1551 held by the Bibliothèque nationale de France. The British Library has an account for food for the French household in the same year. Jacques Alexander supplied 40 boxes used to set the quince preserve "made by the Scottish queen in her chamber" in 1551. Cotignac was also made in the wardrobe and the chamber of the governess Françoise de Paroy.

According to Anthony Standen, before the baptism of Prince James in 1566, an associate of Francis Yaxley came from Flanders with a gift from Margaret Douglas including a "bancketynge dysshe of sugare and marmelade". While Mary was a prisoner at Lochleven Castle, her wardrobe servants sent her boxes of "confiture" of various kinds.

Mary of Guise wrote to France for fruit trees in 1538, and was sent fruit from France including quinces. In England, Elizabeth I received a quince pie as a New Year's Day gift from John Betts, who served her as Sergeant of the Pastry. A box of quince preserve was bought in Edinburgh for James VI in November 1575, described as a "buist of plum de cone or marmelot". In the account "cone" is the French word for quince, coing.

Early Scottish recipes for marmalades and preserves are found in recipe books compiled for Margaret Home, Countess of Moray in the 1630s, a 1683 manuscript associated with Dunrobin Castle, and a recipe book of Katherine Bruce, Lady Saltoun. Fruits were considered as foodstuffs and medicine. Pomegranates and lemons or limes, "20 apile garnattis and 6 sidronis", were sent from Edinburgh to Mary when she was unwell at Jedburgh in October 1566.

=== Mary in English captivity ===
Estienne Hauet alias Stephen Hewat and his wife Elles Boug continued to cook for Mary when she was imprisoned at Lochleven Castle. The queen's food at Lochleven was "furnished" by James Dempsterton or Dempster, a servant of the Laird of Lochleven, while Walter Cockburn furnished the household of her infant son Regent Moray and James VI at Stirling Castle. Estienne and Martin Hauet rejoined Mary's household in England at Tutbury Castle in February 1569.

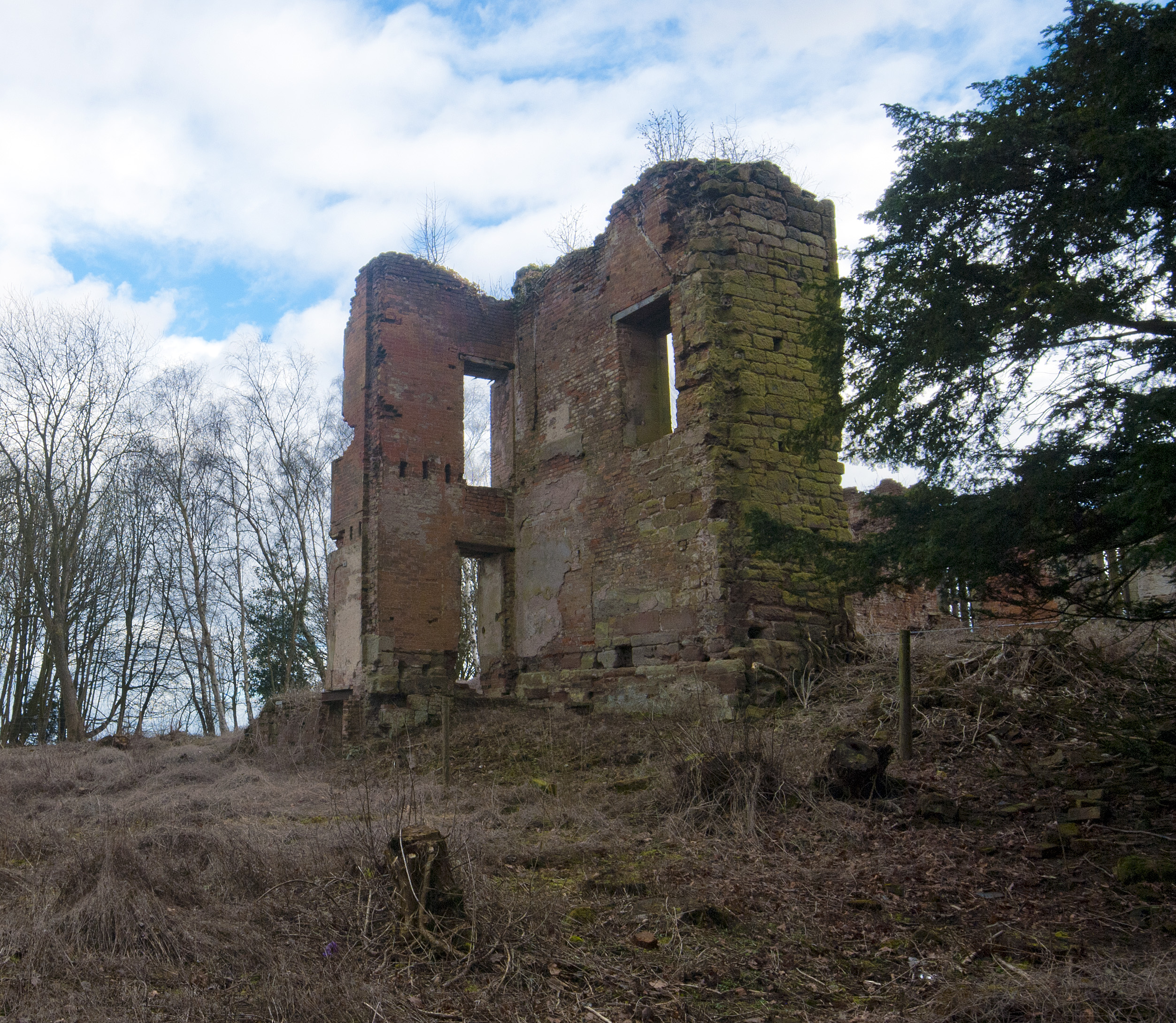
Coal and freshwater fish were brought to Mary's household from the estates of Beaudesert Park on Cannock Chase

A detailed account of food supplied to Mary, Queen of Scots, at Tutbury Castle and Wingfield Manor in England, made by Brian Cave was acquired by the British Library in 2022. It includes "Gascoigne wine", sack, and muscadell, a variety of meats, sea and freshwater fish, and poultry including heron and dotterel. Spices include pepper, saffron and mace, with marmalade, sucket, and comfits. The provisions are similar to diet enjoyed in Scotland. Some items were bought from the Earl of Shrewsbury. "Turnboches" were hired to work in the kitchens turning spits. The fuels used were wood, charcoal, and sea coal. Laundry and table linen was included. The account survives in duplicate.

Another account of household expenses with food for Mary's final months was published by the Camden Society in 1867. Some fish were taken from pools at "Hedsor" or "Hedford" in Canke Wood or Cannock Chase. The fish ponds at Hednesford had been built for John Hales, Bishop of Lichfield, and were still stocked with pike, perch and roach. The ponds were close to Beaudesert Park, and it was suggested Mary might move to Beaudesert from Tutbury. Coal for the kitchens was brought from Beaudesert. English kitchen staff included the cooks, Francis Gisborne, Robert Horne, and Christopher Clinton, and a scalder Henry Walker.

Although these preparations seem thorough, in April 1581 Mary complained about the food around Easter time. It seems the Earl of Shrewsbury had run out of funds. The Earl of Leicester heard of this from a French diplomat, and wrote to the Earl of Shrewsbury:

Your Lordship doth of late kepe the Scottis Queen there very barely for dyett, in so much as uppon Easter Day last she had both so fewe dyshes, & so badd meate in them, as yt was too badd to see yt; and that she finding fault thereatt, your Lordship shuld answeare that you wer cutt off your allowance, & therfore could yeald her no better.

Mary sent a French envoy Albert Fontenay to Scotland in 1584. He was invited to a banquet at Edinburgh Castle by the Earl and Countess of Arran. He decided not to go, for diplomatic reasons, and made his excuses, that he could not eat food prepared in the Scottish fashion without suffering colic. This made James VI smile.

== James VI ==
Food allowances for the household of James VI as an infant at Stirling Castle in 1568 were set out by Regent Moray. Annabell Murray, Countess of Mar and her servants were to have:

First, daily 14 great breads, 1 quart 1 pint wine, 1 gallon 2 quarts ale, 3 loads of coal weekly in winter, viz., from 1 September to 1 April, and in summer 1 1/2 loads, a half pound of candle in winter, and in summer a half of a quarter of a pound of candle.
To my Lady and her servants daily in the kitchen on a flesh (meat) day, 2 "particles" of beef, 2 boiled poultry, 2 roast capons, 3 quarters of mutton, a kid, a side of "sukand" veal, 6 chickens or doves, with baking meat to my Lady only, at the discretion of the Master Household, with pottages after their discretion, and on the fish days suchlike referred to the Steward and Master Household.

The staff included a pastry cook or "pattisar" called Patrick Rannald. In the 1580s he prepared food for one of the king's pets at Holyrood, a leopard known as the "ounce". James VI's master cook, John Lyon, was made a burgess of Edinburgh in June 1581. A comptroller clerk, John Fentoun, and the aide in the king's petty larder, Robert Menteith, made a contract with an Edinburgh candlemaker for a monthly supply of candles. Menteith complained to the court of Edinburgh baillies when the agreement fell through.

James VI wrote to his nobles and lairds for gifts of food, mostly meat and game, to serve on special occasions, often citing national honour as a reason for soliciting gifts. He wrote to Robert Murray of Abercairny for "venison, wild fowls, fed capons" for the wedding of Henrietta Stewart and George Gordon, 1st Marquess of Huntly in July 1588 at Holyrood.

When James returned from the north and the Bridge of Dee in November 1588, he arranged for the marshall of the household William Henderson, the "master catour" John Wingates, and the master of the household Andrew Melville to receive payments from the English subsidy to "furnish" food for the household. The master catour was in charge or purchases or "achates".

=== James VI and Anne of Denmark ===
When James VI was anticipating the arrival of his bride Anne of Denmark, on 30 August 1589 he wrote to ask the Laird of Arbuthnott and Sir Patrick Vans of Barnbarroch to provide "fat beef, mutton on foot, wild fowls and venison, to be delivered to Walter Naish, Master of the Royal Larder".

When James VI sailed to Norway to meet Anne of Denmark in October 1589, his ship was provisioned with 15,000 biscuit bakes costing £300 Scots. There was beef, mutton, salted goose and goose for baking, rabbits and capons for baking, 200 dried cod fish, 200 ling, and 200 skate, two barrels of salmon, 24 stones of cheese, 3 stones of sugar and 12 pounds of confectionary, ginger, pepper, apples, onions, vinegar, 20 great hams, kale and carrots, 180 live capons and oats to feed them, sack and Madeira wine.

On 19 February 1590, James VI wrote from Kronborg to his Privy Council, urging them to forward preparation for his return, for his "comming hame, God willing, draws neire ... a King of Scotland with a newe married Wife will not come hame every daye ... respect not onely my Honor in this, but the Honor of our wholle Nation ... and specially since I have seen so gude an example in this Countrie ... Faile not to provide gude Cheare for us, for we have heir aboundance of gude Meit and part of Drink".

Anne of Denmark had Danish kitchen staff led by a master cook Hans Poppilman, and also female cook called Marion who was a bedchamber servant. Cuisine from the country of origin provided continuity of diet and a cultural bridge for queens consort in the early modern period. James VI was supplied with shortbread and oatcakes by Christian Lindsay, who is also thought to have been a poet. He decided not use her services after the Union of the Crowns and gave her a pension.

=== Trouble in the kitchen ===
The royal income did not always cover the expenses of the household. After James married Anne of Denmark, there were two royal households to cater for. In the Spring of 1591, James had to write to the chancellor, John Maitland of Thirlestane. Two aides of the kitchen had refused to make supper because their conditions were not met, meaning they had not been paid. The Master Cook and his "boy" or assistant had to do their jobs "dressing the meat". The problem seems to have been in Anne's kitchen, as James recalled that Maitland had made a promise to her mother, Sophie of Mecklenburg-Güstrow. James famously wrote "suppose we be not wealthy, let us be proud bodies".<r

=== Diet in 1591 ===
Towards the end of 1591 suggestions were made to reduce the costs of the royal household by cutting down on expenditure on food and costume. The current yearly expenditure was £45,926. It was noted that on Sundays, James VI's table was served with "six cunings" (rabbits, costing 12 shillings), five partridges, four plovers, two wild ducks, one muir-fowl, one dozen laverocks (larks costing 3s), one goose, one grouse, two quarters cow-beef, one great veal, and nine muttons", and Anne of Denmark had similar provisions and "two woodcocks, two capons, and four poultry".

=== Prince Henry at Stirling Castle ===
At Stirling Castle from February 1594 eight aristocratic women or "dames of honour" attending Prince Henry, including Annabell Murray, Countess of Mar, Marie Stewart, Countess of Mar, Lady Abercairny, and Lady Dudhope, were granted a daily allowance for dinner on meat and fish days, including:

On the flesh day to the first service, a piece of beef, two pieces of sodden mutton, a boiled fowl, with six dishes of pottage. Their second service, 12 dishes of roast, at the Master Household's discretion.
The fish day, 12 dishes to the first service viz., plumdames (prunes), rice, butter, eggs, fried toasties, milk and bread, speckit peas, oysters, green kale, and failing of any sort to be supplied with another. The second service, 8 dishes as the season yields, and to their desserts, eggs, raisins, confectionary, and apples, 8 dishes.

As was usual, the servers of the dames' table, and other servants, were fed on the left overs. There was another table for the Mistress Nurse and the women who rocked the cradle, and another for the physician and apothecary, and for the midwife and two others.

For the feast at the baptism of Prince Henry at Stirling Castle in August 1594, James VI sent letters to several lairds and landowners, asking them to send "quick stuff" for the feast, live animals, especially deer and wild fowl, such as they "may have in readiness and spare". The banquet included a course of desserts fashioned in the shape of fish by a Flemish sugar confectioner Jacques de Bousie served in the Great Hall from a model ship with working cannon. The sugar fish were presented in glasses supplied by the court sommelier Jerome Bowie. The poet William Fowler described the scene, explaining that the sugar-laden ship represented the king and queen's good fortune in their voyage across the North Sea and her safe delivery from the "conspiracy of witches", and so Neptune:

did bring such things as the Sea affords, to decore this festival time withal: which immediatly were delivered to the Sewers (servers), forth of the galleries of this ship, out of christalline glasse, very curiously painted with gold & azure, all sorts of fishes: as herrings, whitings, flooks (flounder), oysters, buckles (shell fish), limpets, partans (crab), lapstars (lobsters), crabs, spout-fish, clams: with other infinite things made of sugar, and most truely represented in their own shape. And whilst the ship was unloading: Arion sitting upon the galley nose, which resembled the form of a dolphin fish, played upon his harp.

For the baptism of Princess Elizabeth on 28 November 1596, James VI sent invitations and requests for "wild meat and venison" to the Earl of Rothes, Lord Lindsay and Gray, the Constable of Dundee, and the lairds of Balwearie, Easter Wemyss, Wester Wemyss, Torrie, and Bonnyton.

=== English beer and household books ===
Ale wives in Linlithgow brewed beer for Margaret Tudor, the queen consort of James IV. When James VI sailed to Norway in October 1589, his provisions included eight "cast" or casks of English beer and six casks of ale. Anne of Denmark seems to have preferred English beer to Scottish ale. In 1594, English beer was shipped to Leith and delivered to James Bog, assistant keeper of Anne of Denmark's cellar at Holyrood. The beer, worth £159 Scots was delivered in two tuns, two puncheons, and two "bunnis". A bun was a small cask. Usually the beer was recorded in the household books, which mostly do not survive for the reign of James VI. In March 1595, James VI solicited a gift of beer brewed in England from Sir Robert Cecil and Elizabeth I for the cellars of Stirling Castle and Holyrood. In later years, in March, English beer for James and Anne of Denmark was brewed by Robert Sky and sent to Scotland. King James wrote to James Hudson for "double London beer", which he said Anne drank daily. English beer brewed with hops travelled well, but was an expensive luxury.

Fragments of household books remain for James VI and Anne of Denmark covering most of 1598 and a part of 1599. These were long preserved by the family of the comptroller, George Home of Wedderburn. They are written in the Scots Language, (as is a book from 1512 covering the food of the household of James V as a baby at Linlithgow Palace), and detail the wedding feast of Anne of Denmark's preacher John Sering and Little Anna, and the visit of Ulrik, Duke of Holstein. In May 1599 Thomas Burnett supplied the queen's chamber with fresh butter, eggs, cinnamon, sugar, oranges, and limes, possibly for Marion the bedchamber cook. He supplied fresh butter and sugar candy to her daughter Margaret. The queen drank Bordeaux and Rhenish wine, and French wine was supplied for the wedding of her servant James Ogilvie. The queen's accounts were sometimes countersigned by the master of work, William Schaw.

== Royal banquets in Edinburgh ==
=== Banquet in April 1596 ===
The town of Edinburgh hosted banquets for James VI and Anne of Denmark at public expense, to mark special occasions and to maintain royal favour. In April 1597 it was decided to banquet James at the Minister's lodgings, housing provided for kirk ministers which was in a state of disrepair. Tapestry from Holyrood Palace was used to decorate the venue. The town accounts record a sugar banquet held in the council house in March 1596 costing £30, and a supper in April with a courses of meat of poultry, sugar work costing £23, and patisserie or pastry by Mungo Ross costing £13-10s. Two large platters, probably made of pewter, were borrowed from one Hew Broun were lost and he was given £3-16s-8d compensation.

=== Banquet for the Duke of Holstein ===
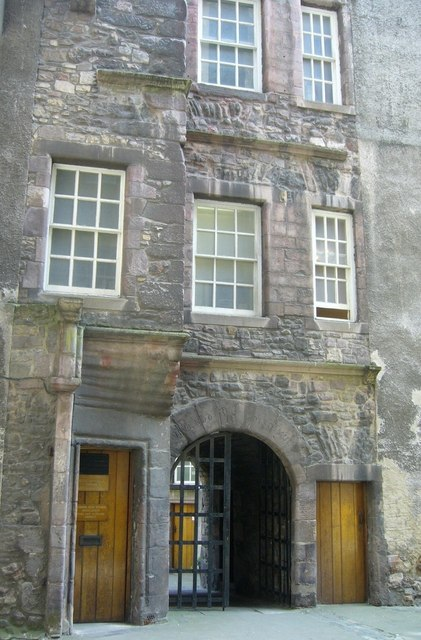
A lavishly documented banquet was held at Riddle's Court on Edinburgh's Lawnmarket on 2 May 1598

The town hosted a banquet for the Duke of Holstein at the house of Ninian MacMorran at Riddle's court on 2 May 1598. The queen's cook Hans Poppilman was employed and tableware and tapestries were borrowed from Holyrood Palace. The king's household book notes that his pastry cook John Ronald made venison pies. Wine was sweetened and spiced to make hippocras by two apothecaries, John Lawtie and John Clavie. Alexander Barclay, an apothecary who frequently worked for the court, made a mutchkin of perfumed rose water. On 22 May 1598 James VI drank all night with the Duke of Holstein. On 19 June, his birthday, James VI had supper at Crichton Castle after a day's sport of hawking.

The baptism of Prince Charles was held in December 1600 at Holyrood House. This time James VI sent an invitation and request to Walter Dundas of Dundas for venison, wild meat, "brissel foulis", and capons. This would be his contribution or "propyne" to "great provision and cheer".

=== Banquet in Edinburgh, 1617 ===
James VI returned to Scotland in 1617 for a visit, leaving Anne of Denmark in London. There were elaborate preparations. Silver and damask table cloths and napkins were sent ahead, in several qualities according to the status of the diners. The Privy Council asked the depute-treasurer Gideon Murray to make plans to finance feeding the royal party, and the provision of "wheat, beir, oats, wine, spices, beef, mutton, and other provisions" to the royal houses. He devised a special tax. Country lairds were asked to send produce, John Grant of Freuchie was asked to provide capercailzies and ptarmigan, for delivery to King James at Newcastle.

Edinburgh town hosted a banquet for King James, in a specially built banqueting house in the Council House Yard. An account for the banquet also survives. The king's fool or "pleasant" Archibald Armstrong was paid £66. There was French and Rhenish wine, sack, ale and beer. An Italian expert laid the table linen. 500 oranges were used to make a dessert with some strawberries and cream. The main courses were of venison and poultry. After the feast the visiting courtiers or "strangers danced through the town". With two other small intimate banquets hosted by Joseph Marjoribanks, the costs of the entertainment was nearly six times greater than the banquet at Riddles Court in 1598. Marjoribanks' country house at Prestonpans, Northfield House, still survives.

== Charles II and his Scottish coronation ==
When Charles II was in Scotland in 1650, spices were bought in December for Christmastime from Andrew Reid, a merchant in Perth, including especially "scrotckets and confects", sugar treats. A "scorchet" was a sugar sweet flavoured with rose water, known to have been served at Scottish celebrations and banquets since the 15th century. Charles was crowned at Scone in January 1651, and although the ceremony was comparatively modest, there was a significant expenditure on the banquet and table linen.

== Academic research ==
The household records supply several historic dates. The death of James V on 14 December 1542 was noted as "Hodie dominus noster illustrissimus rex apud Falkland clausus est extremus". The death of Mary of Guise on 11 June 1560 as, "Mardy unziesme jour de Juing la royne trespassa dedans le charteau d'Edinburg à l'heure de une heure apres mynuict". This official time of death of the queen dowager appears in two contemporary notices of her death like a court circular. Early historians and chronicle writers may have accessed the household books, which seem to have been kept in this form since 1453.

A family history, the Memory of the Somervilles, describes a wedding "infare" at Cowthally Castle and, a few weeks later, the wedding at Craignethan Castle attended by James V. The author, James Somerville cited family household accounts, (now lost). However, the attendance of the king at these two events does not appear in the royal household books, casting doubt on the narrative and suggesting that the king did not visit Craignethan until July 1541, after the execution of his former favourite, James Hamilton of Finnart. James Somerville also claimed that James IV attended a wedding infare at Cowthally in September 1489 or 1490, and describes the meat, fish, and poultry provided. Again, this visit does not seem to fit the royal records. A 17th-century family history of the Lords Lovat makes similar reference to now lost family household books and lavish hospitality, and was written by James Fraser of Phopachy, a grandson of Simon Fraser, 6th Lord Lovat's master household who kept the accounts. These stories, and Pitscottie's description of the Atholl banquet, demonstrate that the provision of food in quantity was a significant element of courtly and aristocratic display, to be incorporated in the storytelling and recollections of later generations.

William Bourne, a zoologist, researched and identified some of the birds mentioned in the household books of James V, (using the extract published in 1836). The historian Amy Blakeway has abstracted data from the royal household books to illustrate the 16th-century inflationary price rise in Scotland. Blakeway has also compared costs to test the contemporary assertion of the comptroller David Wood of Craig that Regent Arran spent more on his household in 1543 than James V, that he "haldis ane greit hous and is at mair (more) sumpteous expense nor (than) umquhile (the late) our said soverane lord held in his time". While 1543 may have been expensive for Arran, costs in later years were lower.

The Latin household books include amounts of bread and ale sent to hunting parties from the places of production. From the figures, it seems that James V took much larger parties on three-day trips to Glenfinglas than Glenfinglas, or at least much more ale was consumed at the Hunt Halls at his expense. Some courtiers and locals may have made their own arrangements, and estimating the exact numbers, probably in the hundreds, may be difficult.

== Masters of the Royal Household ==
The Master of Household was responsible for the budget and buying food. They were not expected to be continually present after appointment but served quarterly in terms of three months. James Ogilvie was replaced by Gilbert Balfour in October 1565 for ignoring his summons to rejoin the court.

Margaret Tudor's household was also served by an administrator called the "Great Purveyor". This office was held by Duncan Forestar of Skipinch in 1508. Lesser officers who received payments and bought food include the marshall and caterer. William Henderson was marshall for James VI and John Windegates was caterer under the Master of Household Andrew Melville of Garvock.

John Seton of Barnes made a contract in January 1587 which outlines the duties and financial responsibilities of the Master Households. David Beaton and Harry Lindsay were masters of household for Anne of Denmark. They complained in 1591 about missing allowances for the meals of ladies in waiting and other courtiers, including Marie Stewart, who deserved a "disjeune" or breakfast because she was a "tender bairn". At this time various suggestions were made to reduce the expenditure of both households on food. James Hudson reported that the king's table and the queen's "had like to have been unserved for want, the queen her house and trayne are more costlie to him than his own". After calculating and extrapolating the costs of food, the Master Households were advised that no more than £900 should be spent yearly on spices for the queen bought from Andrew Quhyte, and no more than £1500 on sugar, comfits, almonds, oil, and lard supplied by Robert Robesoun.

Servants and artisans who joined the royal households were given allowances of food according to their rank. Rolls of the royal household usually include these allowances, often organised in tables of servants who ate together, like Anne of Denmark's Danish servants. In November 1602 the embroiderer Thomas Barclay joined her household at Dunfermline Palace and she wrote to her Master of Household, Patrick Hume of Polwarth, asking him to give Barclay meat, bread, ale, candle and coal. The allowance was called an "ordinar".

Office holders included:

- James Anstruther
- Gilbert Balfour of Westray.
- David Beaton of Melgund
- John Beaton.
- Robert Beaton of Creich
- Francisco de Busso.
- Michael Elphinstone (1544-1625), Master of Household to James VI.
- Alan Cathcart, 4th Lord Cathcart.
- John Campbell of Lundy.
- John Colville of Easter Wemyss.
- John Cunningham of Drumquhassle.
- Mungo Graham of Rathernis, (died 1589).
- Matthew Hamilton of Milnburn
- Patrick Hepburn, 1st Earl of Bothwell
- Patrick Hume of Polwarth
- James Learmonth of Dairsie.
- Harry Lindsay of Carrestoun
- William Livingstone of Kilsyth, appointed 1583.
- Patrick Lyon, 1st Lord Glamis
- Andrew Melville of Garvock.
- John Murray, younger of Tullibardine (1584).
- James Ogilvie of Cardell (1562).
- Robert Sempill, 3rd Lord Sempill
- John Seton of Barnes
- Bartholomew de Villemore
- Patrick Wemyss of Pittencrieff.
