= James Redheuch =

James Redheuch, Redeheuch, Reidheugh, Riddoch, or Reddoch (died 1541) was a Scottish courtier.

He was a burgess of Stirling and became a steward in the household of James IV of Scotland when he was prince (before the death of James III of Scotland.

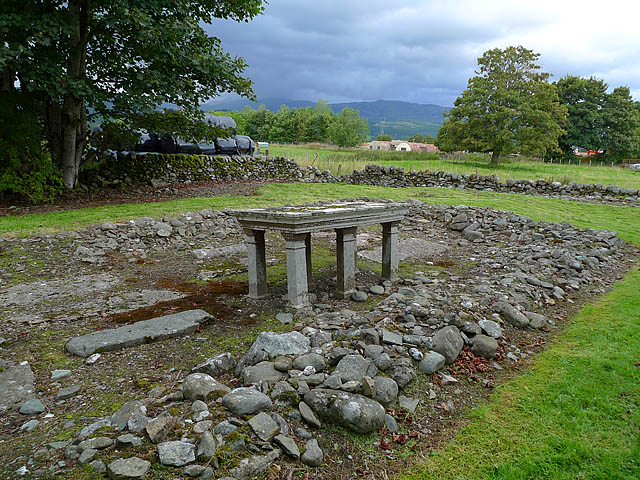
Ruins of the kirk of Tullichettle, near Comrie, Perth and Kinross

As Comptroller of Scotland from 1505 to 1509 and 1512 to 1513, and Chamberlain of Menteith and of Strathearn, Redheuch was in charge of revenues paid to James IV of Scotland. He was also a steward of the household from 1502 to 1510.

Redheuch usually acted as an administrator the king's household, while Duncan Forestar of Garden was the equivalent comptroller of Margaret Tudor's household.

In November 1503 he bought pewter water pots for the royal household. In October 1504, he organised carts to come to Dunfermline Palace to help evacuate Margaret Tudor and her English servants to Lindores Abbey because of a plague scare. The carts were not used, and Margaret and the "More Lassis" came to Edinburgh in November.

Redheuch held various lands in Perthshire, including from 1502, Tullichedil (Tullichettle) and Cultybraggan near Comrie, Perth and Kinross.

His wife was called Margaret. The family continued to live around the Comrie area. A daughter, Euphemia Redheuch, married Walter Stewart, a son of William Stewart of Advorlich. His granddaughter Barbara married John Drummond of Lennoch, north of Comrie. By 1571, there was a feud between the Redheuch family of Cultybraggan and the Murrays of Drumfin and Tullibardine. This followed the marriage of Isobel Redheuch and Alexander Murray of Drumfin, a son of William Murray of Tullibardine.
