= Bartholomew de Villemore =

Bartolomew de Villemore was a French courtier and administrator to Mary of Guise, the mother of Mary, Queen of Scots.

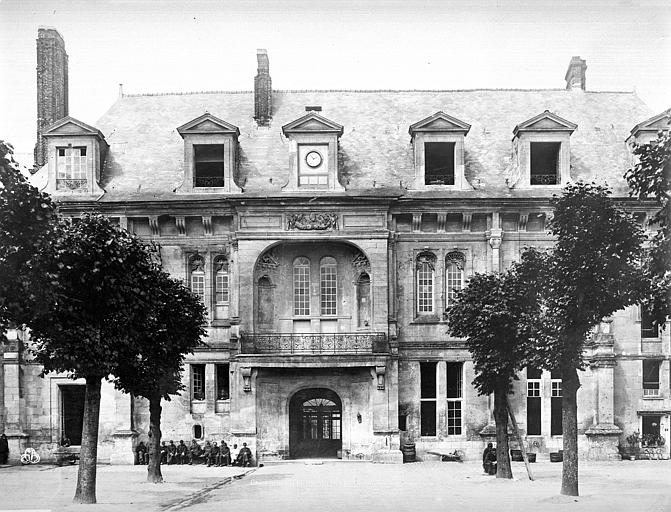
Bartholomew de Villemore visited Mary, Queen of Scots at Villers-Cotterêts in September 1554

Villemore was an official in the household of Mary, Queen of Scots in France. In February 1551 Mary of Guise directed Patrick, Master of Ruthven to him for payment of 400 French crowns. Ruthven complained that Villemore offered payment in old deprecated testoons and sous. During Mary of Guise's visit to France, Villemore was involved with the wardrobe of her household, and commissioned black velvet gowns for two of her gentlewomem.

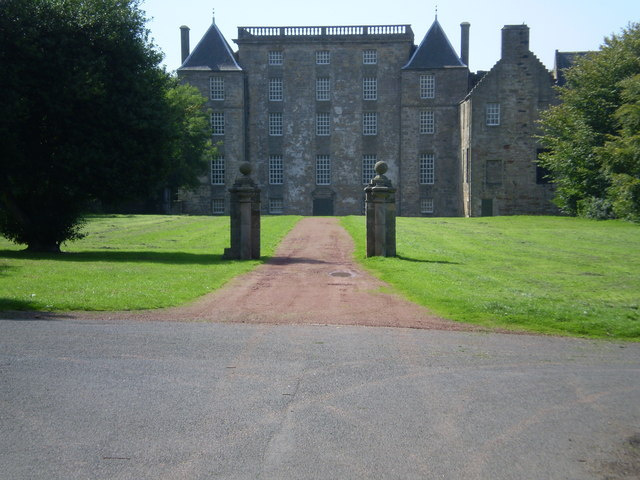
Thomas Randolph spent some time with Mary, Queen of Scots and Bartolomew de Villemore at Kinneil House

He was employed in Scotland, and returned to visit the household of Mary, Queen of Scots, in France at Villers-Cotterêts in September 1554. Françoise de Paroy et d'Estainville, Mary's governess, wrote to Mary of Guise that they were glad to hear his news. Mary was having her portrait painted by an artist who had served Francis I, Duke of Lorraine.

Villemore was appointed Comptroller of the Scottish exchequer on 1 May 1555, making him receiver-general of crown revenue.

On 12 May 1559 John Scrimgeour of Myres wrote to Villemore about building work at Falkland Palace. Only the glazing of the tower windows was completed, more work would be needed to finish the chambers and galleries before Mary of Guise visited. He was repairing timberwork in the palace and stables. He was also working on new fencing, ditches, and dykes, and wanted to discuss these works with Villemore in person. The letter shows that Villemore was involved in directing the Regent's works. It is kept at the National Archives of Scotland with a group of receipts and vouchers from Villemore's comptroller accounts in 1558 and 1559.

The English ambassador in Paris, Nicholas Throckmorton heard in November 1560 that Villemore sought funds to keep a garrison on Inchkeith, even using soldiers from Dunbar Castle because of its strategic importance in the Firth of Forth. Villemore continued as comptroller until October 1561, when he returned to France. John Wishart of Pitarrow was made comptroller in his place.

During the challenge to the rule of Mary of Guise posed by the Scottish Reformation, the Lords of the Congregation complained about her French officers of state Villemore, Yves de la Rubarye, and Henri Cleutin in a manifesto of October 1559. The Earl of Arran challenged Villemore's appointment as Comptroller on 17 March 1560 because he was not Scottish. According to the English ambassador in Paris, Villemore canvassed for a stronger garrison on the fortress island of Inchkeith, claiming that soldiers were better deployed there than at Dunbar Castle. In June 1561, it was proposed that Thomas Graham should be Comptroller, and Villemore his advisor. Lord James wrote to Mary that the comptroller would see to the repair of her palaces for her return to Scotland.

The English diplomat at the court of Mary, Queen of Scots, Thomas Randolph mentioned Villemore in his letters of November 1562. Mary had been in Aberdeenshire, campaigning against the Earl of Huntly and Villemore came to her at Dunnotar Castle. She returned south to Kinneil House, near Linlithgow, where Lord Gordon was held prisoner. Villemore was at Kinneil. Randolph felt that Villemore's reputation was not very high. It was said he was a "false flattering varlet", his wife had run away with another man in France, and he returned to Scotland to "follow his old trade of a villainous life".

Villemore was a master of the queen's household in 1563, and signed her household books. He travelled to France with Thomas Maitland, a brother of Mary's secretary William Maitland of Lethington.
