= Master of the Household of Scotland =

The office of Master of the Household is one of the Great Offices of the Royal Household of Scotland. It was held by various Earls of Argyll from the reign of James IV onwards. It was confirmed as a hereditary office to the 9th Earl by Crown charter of novodamus in 1667, and has remained with the Dukes of Argyll to the present day.

Archibald Campbell, 7th Earl of Argyll, was out of favour in August 1594 and so Robert Seton, 6th Lord Seton, acted as Master of Household at the baptism of Prince Henry at Stirling Castle.

The daily administrative function of the Master of the Household was carried out by deputies, usually known as Masters of the Household, whose duties included the provision of food to the monarchs and their courtiers and servants.
