= James Colville (judge) =

Scottish administrator, lord of session and diplomat

Sir James Colville of Easter Wemyss (died 1540) was a Scottish administrator, lord of session and diplomat.

== Life ==
He was the elder son of Robert Colville of Ochiltree and Margaret Logan. He was one of the commissioners to parliament on 15 February 1525. He was appointed to the office of comptroller by 1525, when he made an account of household expenses for James V of Scotland.

In 1529 he exchanged the lands of Ochiltree with James Hamilton of Finnart for the lands of Easter Wemyss and Lochorshyre in Fifeshire. The same year he was appointed a director of the chancery. He was one of the commissioners to parliament on 24 April and 13 May 1531, 15 December 1535, and 29 April 1536. He was nominated a lord of the articles on 13 May 1532 and 7 June 1535, and at the latter date was chosen a commissioner for the taxation of £6,000 voted by the three estates to James V of Scotland on his approaching marriage.

On the institution of the College of Justice in 1532, Colville was appointed one of the judges on the temporal side of the bench, and was knighted. He was one of the commissioners at the truce of Newcastle on 8 October 1533, and was sent again into England to treat for peace in the following year.

For siding with the Douglases he was in 1538 deprived of the office of comptroller. In November, the English border official Thomas Wharton heard that the secretary Adam Otterburn of Auldhame was imprisoned at Dumbarton Castle for speaking with the banished Douglas family and James Colville was in prison for "his accomptes". David Wood of Craig was made comptroller in his place.

On 30 May 1539 a summons of treason was executed against him for affording them countenance and assistance. He appeared to answer to the charge before the parliament on 18 July 1539, when the only charge persisted in against him was that while comptroller he, on 14 July 1528, had made a pretended assignation for the benefit of Archibald Douglas of Kilspindy, when he knew that a summons of treason against him had been at that time executed. For this he was ordered on 21 August to enter himself in ward in Blackness Castle. He disobeyed this order, and, back in England, associated with Archibald Douglas, 6th Earl of Angus, and his brother in treason attempts against the Scottish king.

Colville died in 1540. On 10 January 1541, a summons was executed against his widow and children, on account of his having incurred the crime of lèse-majesté. His estate was annexed to the crown, but was then bestowed on Norman Leslie of Rothes. The forfeiture was rescinded in parliament on 12 December 1543, under the direction of Cardinal Beaton.

== Family ==
Colville was twice married:

- first, to Alison, eldest daughter of Sir David Bruce of Clackmannan, and,
- second, to Margaret Forrester, who survived him.

Colville had a son and a daughter by each marriage, the son of the second marriage being Alexander Colville, the lord of session. He had also an illegitimate son, Robert, ancestor of the Lord Colvilles of Culross and current Viscount Colville of Culross .

== Notes ==
Attribution

This article incorporates text from a publication now in the public domain: Stephen, Leslie, ed. (1887). "Colville, James". Dictionary of National Biography. Vol. 11. London: Smith, Elder & Co.
