= Duncan Forestar =

Duncan Forestar or Forrester of Torwood and Skipinch was a Scottish courtier and financial administrator. He also served as Provost of Stirling.

His family home was Torwood Castle near Stirling. "Skipinch" was an alternative name for Skipness Castle. James IV of Scotland gave him a barony of the lands of Skipness and the keepership of the castle on 3 July 1495.

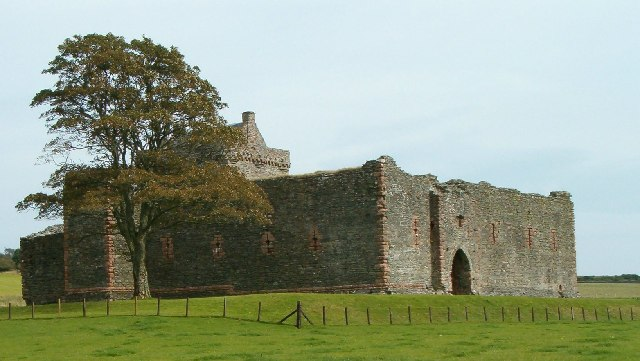
Duncan Forestar was made baron of Skipinch in 1495 and keeper of Skipness Castle

Duncan Forestar was also called "of Garden", from another property near Stirling. His son was Walter Forestar. Alexander Forrester of Garden was a member of a later generation of the same family.

Duncan Forestar was keeper of Stirling Castle in 1480. He was Comptroller of Scotland from 1492 to 1499 and from 1508 to 1509, serving James IV of Scotland. The Comptroller was in charge of collecting and spending royal revenue. In 1508 he was "Great Purveyor to the Queen" or "Magnus Provisor", in charge of purchasing food and other items for the household of Margaret Tudor, the wife of James IV. James Redheuch was the equivalent administrator for the king's household. For a time there were separate household accounts for Margaret Tudor, but these records do not now survive.

His accounts written in Latin mention royal servants, including the king's tailor John Steel, his barber James Jacklin, and the master cook Thomas Schaw. Some expenses were met for the Spanish ambassador Pedro de Ayala, and details are given of Perkin Warbeck (called the Duke of York) and the raids in England to Norham Castle and Heaton Castle.

Forestar maintained a family burial aisle on the west side of the Church of the Holy Rude in Stirling. He outlived two wives, Margaret Forsyth and Margaret Bothwell. His son Walter Forestar was a servant of Margaret Tudor, acting as her provisor in 1508, when Duncan Forestar was the knight comptroller of her household.
