= St Brendan's Chapel, Skipness =

Medieval ruined church near Skipness, Scotland

St Brendan's Chapel
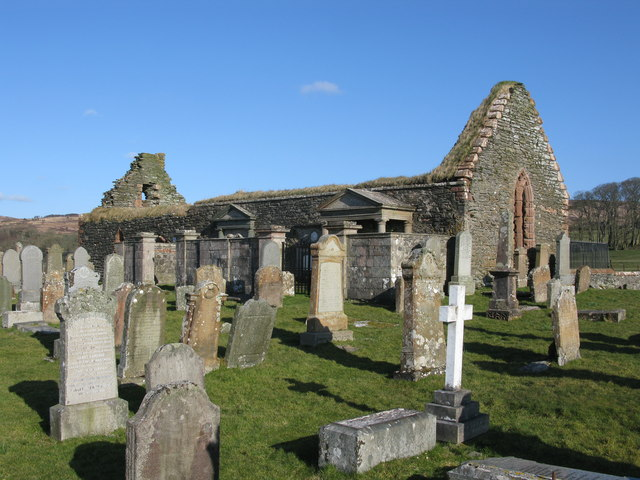
- Church in 2018
- St Brendan's Chapel
- 55.7659°N 5.3327°W
- Location: Skipness, Argyll and Bute
- Country: Scotland

Scheduled monument
- Official name: Skipness Castle and Kilbrannan Chapel
- Type: Ecclesiastical: chapel, Secular: castle
- Designated: 7 February 2013
- Reference no.: SM13225

St Brendan's Chapel, also known as Kilbrannan Chapel, is a ruined medieval church located near Skipness, Argyll and Bute, Scotland. Dedicated to St. Brendan, the chapel was probably built around the same time as nearby Skipness Castle, in the late 13th or early 14th century. It is an excellent example of a medieval chapel, and also important for its association with Skipness Castle and its collection of late medieval carved tombstones. Together with the castle, the chapel is designated a scheduled monument.

== Description ==
Skipness castle and Kilbrannan Chapel are located near the village of Skipness, Argyll and Bute, Scotland. The castle is situated on a slight slope, overlooking the Kilbrannan Sound and the Isle of Arran. Kilbrannan Chapel lies 330m southeast of the castle, near the shore. Kilbrannan chapel is also notable because it is significantly bigger than other medieval chapels in Kintyre.

The roofless chapel consists of a well-preserved, rectangular, single-chambered structure, measuring 25m x 8m. Walls vary in thickness from 1.14m to 1.37m. The outer walls were constructed with coursed rubble masonry, while the doors, windows, quoins and skews were built with dressed red sandstone. The church was lit by splayed lancet windows in the nave and chancel. A large Y-traceried window is sited at the East end. There are two entrance doors in the South wall (one now blocked) and one in door in the North wall. The chapel and adjacent graveyard contain five notable late medieval recumbent tombstones, along with several pre-Reformation slabs and many 18th and early 19th century gravestones The graveyard is still in use today.

== History ==
The name 'Kilbrannan' and the discovery of early medieval burials at the site suggest that an earlier church existed where Kilbrannan chapel now stands. Dedicated to St Brendan, the chapel was built to replace the earlier chapel of St Columba, whose remains lie near Skipness Castle. Construction on the new chapel probably occurred around the same time the castle was being built, in the late 13th or early 14th century. St Brendan's continued to function as the parish church after the castle was abandoned, until at least 1692. The chapel discontinued being used as a place of worship during the 18th century, possibly with the establishment of a new parish church at Claonaig. The cemetery is still in used in the community as a burial ground.

The chapel and Skipness Castle are together designated a scheduled monument.
