= Skipness =

Coordinates: 55°46′01″N 5°20′42″W

Skipness: Scottish Gaelic: Sgibinis
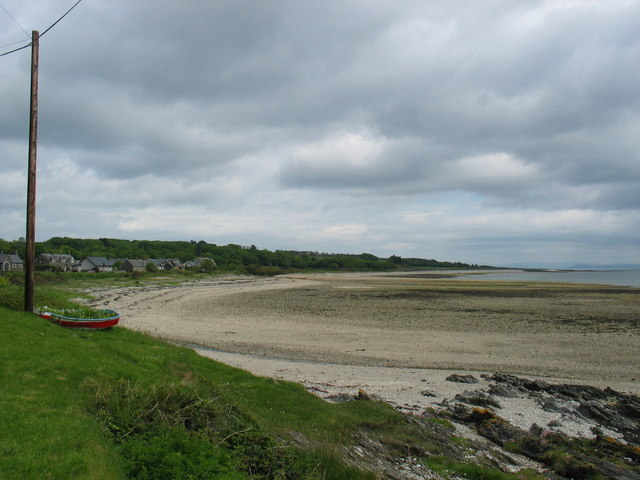
- Skipness Bay

- Location within Argyll and Bute
- OS grid reference: NR902576
- Council area: Argyll and Bute
- Lieutenancy area: Argyll and Bute
- Country: Scotland
- Sovereign state: United Kingdom
- Post town: TARBERT
- Postcode district: PA29
- Police: Scotland
- Fire: Scottish
- Ambulance: Scottish
- UK Parliament: Argyll, Bute and South Lochaber
- Scottish Parliament: Argyll and Bute

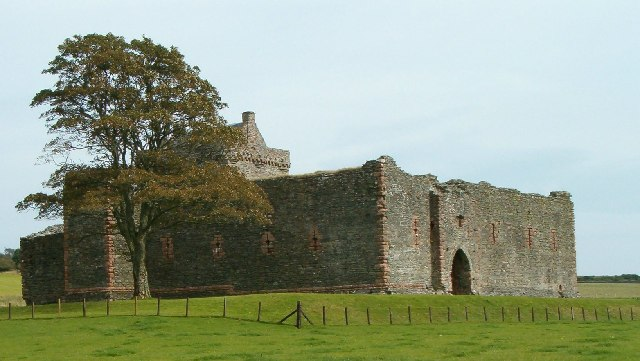
Skipness Castle

Skipness (Scottish Gaelic: Sgibinis, pronounced [ˈs̪kʲipɪnɪʃ]) is a village and Quoad sacra parish on the east coast of Kintyre in Scotland, located just over 7 miles (11 km) south of Tarbert and facing the Isle of Arran.

There is Skipness Castle (a ruined castle) and Kilbrannan Chapel, also known as St Brendan's Chapel. Both the castle and the chapel date from the 13th century, and are maintained by Historic Environment Scotland and are designated scheduled monuments.
