= Comptroller of Scotland =

The Comptroller of Scotland was a post in the pre-Union government of Scotland.

The Treasurer and Comptroller had originated in 1425 when the Chamberlain's financial functions were transferred to them.

From 1466 the Comptroller had sole responsibility for financing the royal household to which certain revenues (the property) were appropriated, with the Treasurer being responsible for the remaining revenue (the casualty) and other expenditure. Accounts were audited by and approved by the court of the exchequer. In the 1470s the court of the exchequer met at Falkland Palace yearly to finalise the accounts of the jointure lands of Mary of Guelders.

By the 1530s the exchequer usually met in Edinburgh to audit and produce the accounts. Rooms were hired in the Blackfriars for the sessions. County sheriffs and other officials brought their reckonings to the exchequer. The accounts of the comptrollers were mostly in written in Latin, and were published as the Exchequer Rolls of Scotland.

The role of the Comptroller in Scotland was outlined in a French text of 1559, the Discours Particulier D'Escosse. He was receiver general of the royal estates or property, the crown lands. He would appoint receivers for the rents of regions. The Comptroller was the general collector of customs and levies for trade in ports and burghs. He could arrest and sell the goods of anyone who defaulted their due payments, or imprison them as debtors, or proclaim them "at horn", technically rebels to the crown and no longer credit-worthy. The Treasurer's income was based "casualties" rather than the feudal rent and duties collected by the Comptroller. Casualties included money paid to the crown when properties were transferred.

Some details of the business of the comptroller and comptrollery, and the comptroller's expenses were recorded in the account of George Wishart of Drymme, who worked for John Wishart of Pitarrow in 1564. Gifts of food were presented to Pitarrow included malmsey wine, pears, oranges, and aqua vitae. Ale and wine was bought for the "chekker hous". Pitarrow's cook was Charles Steidman. The account includes a payment for balls and golf clubs at Leith.

James VI attended the Exchequer in person in Edinburgh on 13 February 1595, which pleased courtiers who wished to see him manage his estate. According to Roger Aston, he criticised inefficient exchequer officers who failed to maximise his revenues, forcing him to raise loans or tax his subjects.

The offices of Lord High Treasurer, Comptroller, Collector-General and Treasurer of the New Augmentation were held by the same person from 1610 onwards, but their separate titles survived the effective merging of their functions in 1635. From 1667 to 1682 the Treasury was in commission, and again from 1686 to 1708, when the separate Scottish Treasury was abolished. From 1690 the Crown nominated one person to sit in Parliament as Treasurer.

== Comptrollers of Scotland ==
- 1426 David Brune
- 1429 John Spence
- 1446 Alexander Nairne of Sanford
- 1448 Robert de Livingston
- 1458 Ninian Spot canon of Dunkeld
- 1464 John Colquhoun of Colquhoun
- 1467 David Guthrie of Guthrie
- 1468 Adam Wallace of Craigie
- 1471 James Schaw of Sauquhy
- 1472 Alexander Leslie of Warderis
- ? Thomas Simson
- 1488 Alexander Inglis, archdeacon of St Andrews
- 1492 Duncan Forestar of Skipinch.
- 1499 Patrick Hume of Polwarth
- 1506 James Beaton, abbot of Dunfermline
- 1507 James Riddoch of Aberladenoche
- 1513 Robert Arnot of Woodmill, killed at Flodden
- 1514 Duncan Forrester of Garden
- 1515 Patrick Hamilton
- 1516 Alexander Garden or Jardine.
- 1520 Robert Barton of Over Barnton
- 1525 James Colville of Ochiltree.
- 1538 David Wood of Craig
- 1543 Thomas Menzies
- 1546 William, commendator of Culross
- 1548 William, abbot of Ross
- 1557 Yves du Rubay, vice-chancellor to Mary of Guise as Regent
- 1560 Bartholomew de Villemore.
- 1561 John Wishart of Pitarrow
- 1565 William Murray of Tullibardine.
- 1567 James Cockburn of Skirling
- 1580 John Murray, younger of Tullibardine.
- 1584 James Campbell of Ardkinglas
- 1585 Andrew Wood of Largo
- 1589 David Seton of Parbroath
- 1597 George Home of Wedderburn
- 1598 Walter Stewart, prior of Blantyre
- 1600 David Murray of Gospertie
- 1603 Peter Rollock, bishop of Dunkeld
- 1610 James Hay of Fingask
- 1615 Gideon Murray of Elibank, comptroller and treasurer-depute.
