= George Home (Comptroller of Scotland) =

Sir George Home of Wedderburn (1552 – 1616) was briefly Comptroller of the Scottish Exchequer, and a member of the household to James VI of Scotland.

== Career ==
George Home was the son of Mariota Johnston and David Home of Wedderburn (d. 1574). He was born at Elphinstone Castle, educated at Dunbar Grammar School, and joined the household of Regent Morton. He was appointed warden of the East March on 6 September 1578.

After the political fall of Regent Morton, George Home was imprisoned for six months to punish him for supporting the Morton government. He was also imprisoned in Doune Castle after the 'Raid of Stirling' in 1584.

Rehabilated to royal favour, he was Warden of the East Marches, Comptroller of the Scottish Exchequer from 1597 to 1597, and Master of the Royal Household. George was unable to make ends meet for James VI and Anne of Denmark but was given a refund after he lost the job. His leisure interests included hawking and falconry and he built a new house called "Handaxewood" in the Lammermuirs for his hobby.

George married Jean Haldane of Gleneagles in 1578, they had one son and six daughters.

== Legacy ==
George is remembered for a remark attributed to him by his younger brother David Hume of Godscroft. George Home was supposed to have argued with the Regent Morton for the restitution of the estates of Alexander Home, 1st Earl of Home whose father had supported Mary, Queen of Scots. Morton argued that this would be to George Home's own detriment. According to Godscroft, George explained his loyalty to the young chief of his family, answering;

"the Lord Hume was his chief, and he could not see his house ruined; if they were unkinde he could not do withall, that would be their own fault; this he thought himself bound to do, and for his own part whatsoever their carriage were to him, he would do his duty to them; if his chief should turne him out at the fronte-doore, he would come in again the back-doore."

The Earl of Home was restored to his estates with the help of the Erskine brothers, the Commendators of Dryburgh and Cambuskenneth, kinsmen of George Home's wife. George Home's remark has been quoted by more recent historians including Gordon Donaldson as an example of an expression of family solidarity in the Scottish Borders. Hume of Godscroft had earlier used the example of front door and back door in a pro-Unionist tract, describing it as a tired argument against the union of Scotland and England.

== See also ==
- Home baronets
