= David Wood of Craig =

David Wood of Craig was a Scottish courtier and administrator

Wood was Master of the King's Larder for James V of Scotland. He was promoted Comptroller of Scotland from 1538 to 1543. The previous administration had displeased James V. In November 1538, the English border official Thomas Wharton heard that the secretary Adam Otterburn of Auldhame was imprisoned at Dumbarton Castle for speaking with the banished Douglas family and the former comptroller, James Colville was in prison for "his accomptes".

In 1543, Wood said of Regent Arran that he spent more on his household than James V. He "haldis ane greit hous and is at mair (more) sumpteous expense nor (than) umquhile (the late) our said soverane lord held in his time".

Craig Castle is near Montrose in Maryton parish. David Wood had a charter of the property from David Beaton in 1535.

== Marriage and family ==
His children included:

- Andrew Wood.
- Agnes Wood, who married John Carnegie of Colluthie (older brother of David Carnegie of Colluthie), their daughter married Patrick Kinnaird of that Ilk.
