= Skipness Castle =

Castle in Scotland

- Kintyre peninsula, Scotland; near the village of Skipness
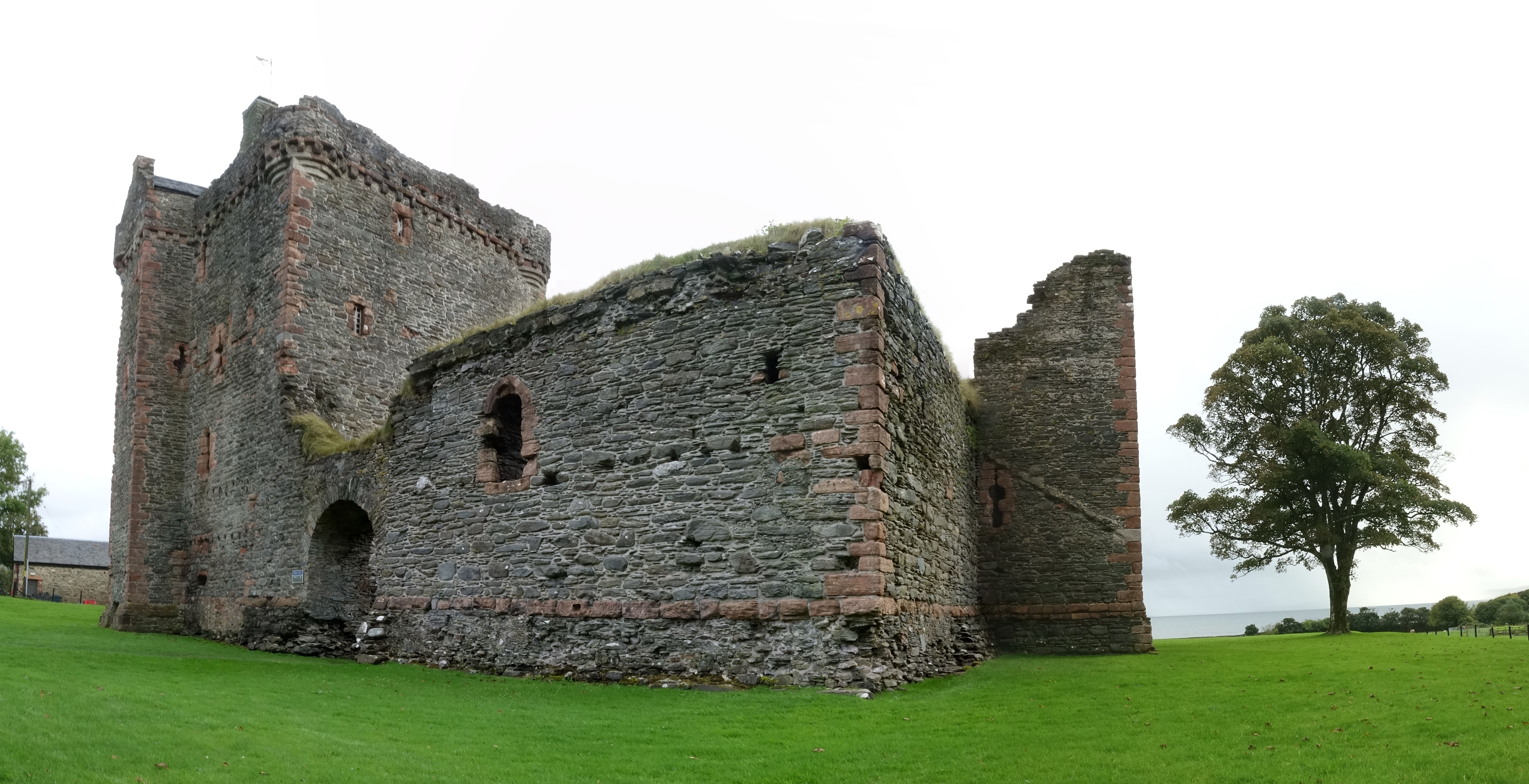
- The castle in 2023

Site information
- Type: Castle

Location
- Coordinates: 55.7680°N 5.3364°W

Site history
- In use: 13th – 17th century

Scheduled monument
- Official name: Skipness Castle and Kilbrannan Chapel
- Type: Ecclesiastical: chapel, Secular: castle
- Designated: 7 February 2013
- Reference no.: SM13225

Skipness Castle stands on the east side of the Kintyre peninsula in Scotland, near the village of Skipness. Together with the nearby Kilbrannan Chapel it is a scheduled monument.

== History ==
The main structure of the castle was built in the early 13th century by the Clan MacSween, with later fortifications and other additions made to the castle through the 13th, 14th and 16th centuries.

The castle was garrisoned with royal troops in 1494, during King James IV of Scotland's suppression of the Isles. James IV appointed Duncan Forestar as keeper of the castle. Archibald Campbell, 2nd Earl of Argyll, granted Skipness to his younger son, Archibald Campbell, in 1511.

During the Wars of the Three Kingdoms in 1646, the castle was besieged by forces under the command of Alasdair Mac Colla. During the siege, Alasdair's brother, Gilleasbuig Mac Colla, was killed in August 1646. The castle was abandoned in the 17th century.

== Gallery ==
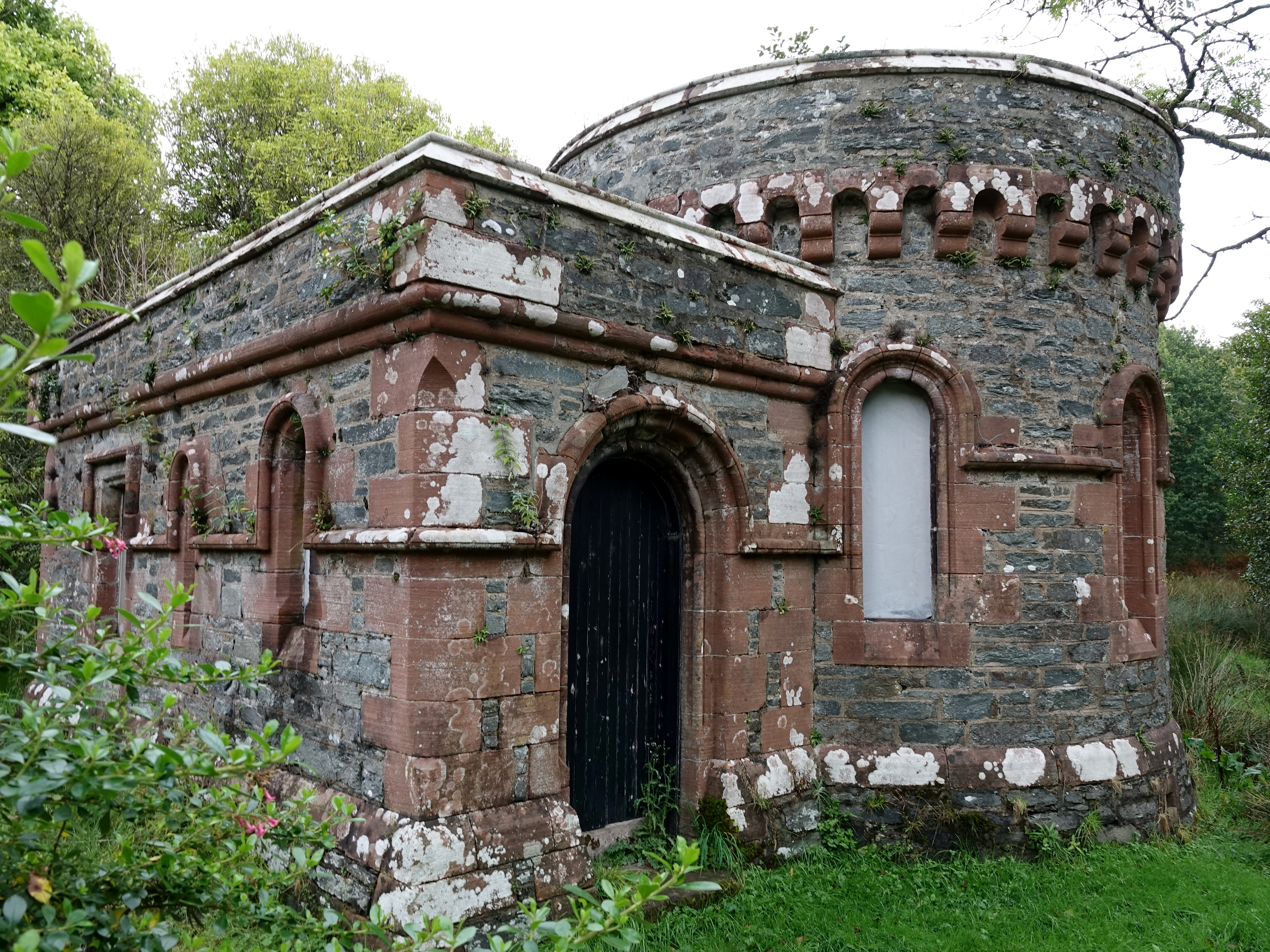
The gatehouse in 2023

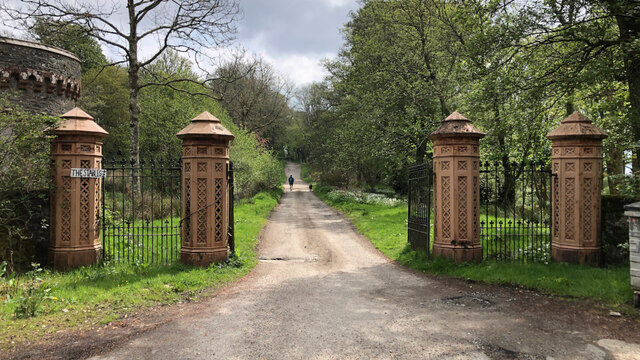
Entrance Gate to Skipness House in 2022

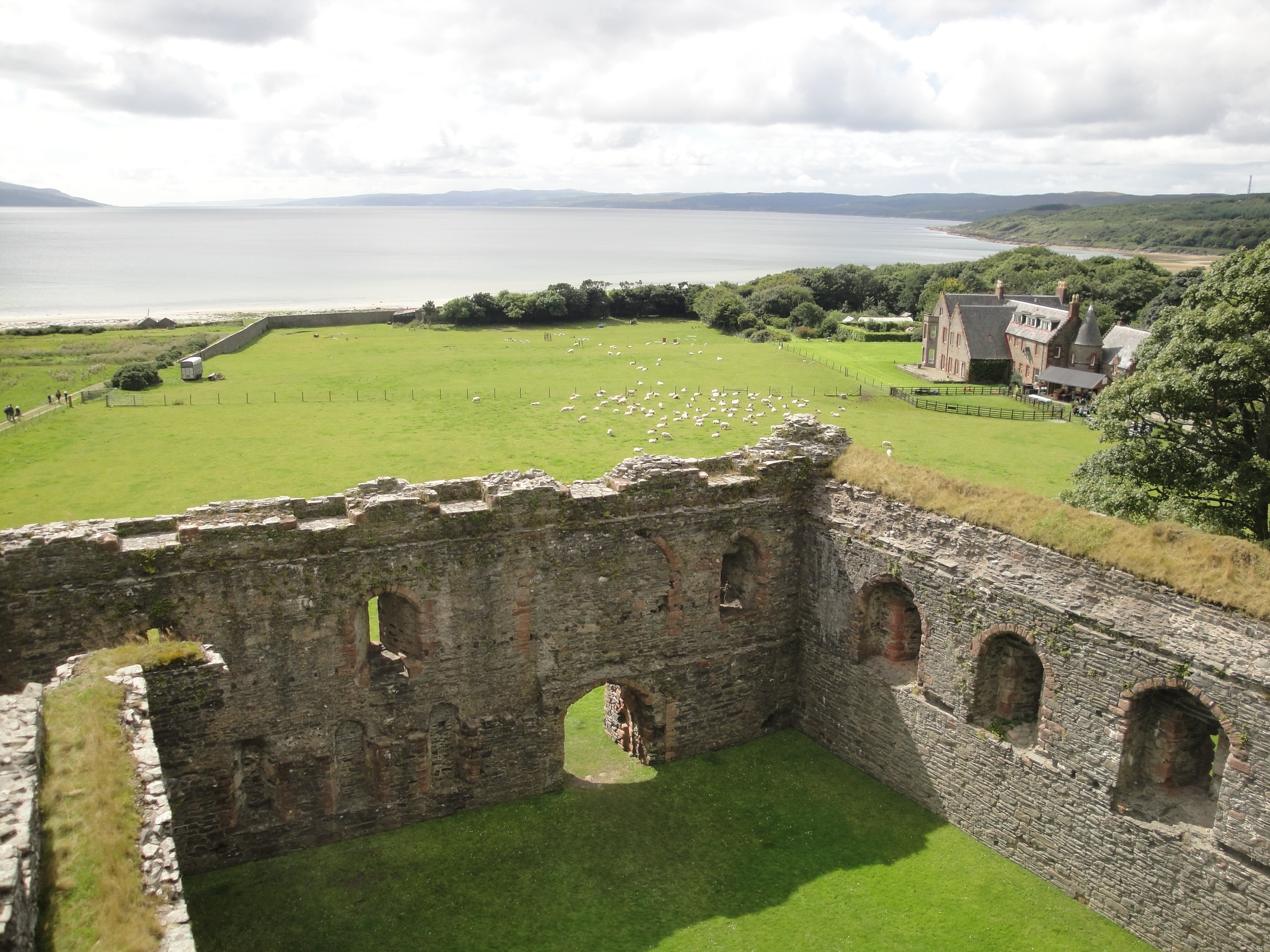
Aerial view in 2014

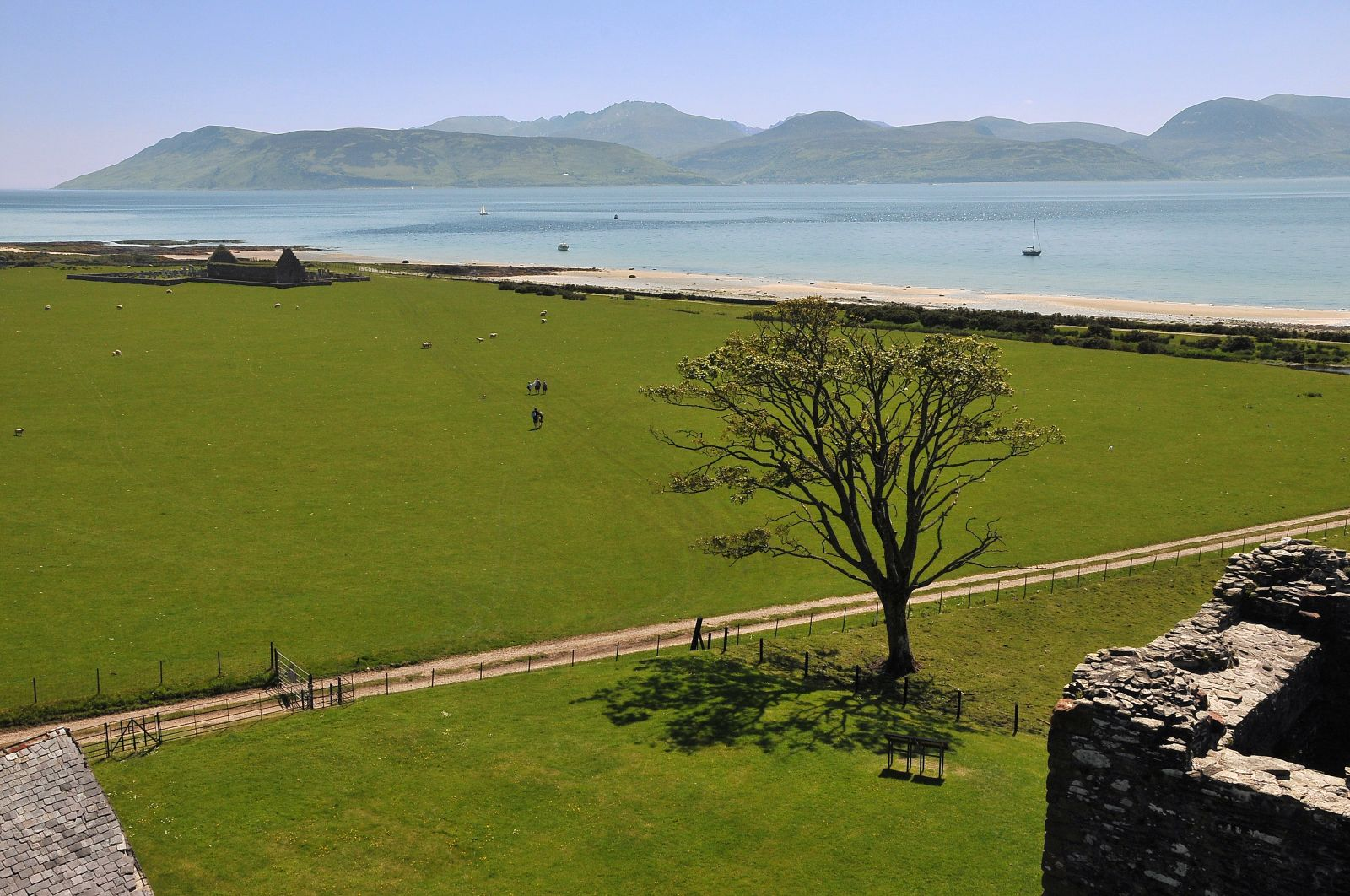
View from the castle in 2009
