= John Wishart of Pitarrow =

Scottish statesman and lawyer (died 1576)

Sir John Wishart of Pitarrow (died 1576) was a Scottish lawyer, courtier, comptroller of the exchequer, and rebel.

== Career ==
He was the eldest son of James Wishart of Cairnbeg in the parish of Fordoun in Aberdeenshire. His grandfather, James Wishart of Pittarrow had been clerk of the justiciary court and king's advocate. John succeeded his uncle, John Wishart, in the lands and barony of Pittarrow in 1545. Pittarrow is also often spelled "Pitarro".

On 14 March 1557 he joined Archibald Campbell, 4th Earl of Argyll, Alexander Cunningham, 5th Earl of Glencairn, the Lord James Stewart, and John Erskine of Dun, in signing a letter to John Knox, who was then at Geneva, inviting him to return to Scotland. During the next few years Wishart continued one of the leading members of the Protestant party in Scotland. On 24 May 1559 they met at Perth to organise resistance to the queen regent Mary of Guise. Wishart and Erskine were chosen to assure her envoys that, while the Lords of the Congregation had no disloyal intentions, but would firmly assert their privileges. On 4 June Wishart and Erskine had a conference at St Andrews with Argyll and Lord James Stewart, who had been suspected of leanings towards the regent's party since the destruction of the monasteries. Soon afterwards Wishart and William Cunningham of Cunninghamhead were appointed to negotiate with Mary of Guise, on the subject of liberty of worship. A second deputation, of which Wishart was one, failed to obtain more than vague promises, and they proceeded to demand the banishment of her French supporters from the kingdom. Finding it impossible to gain satisfactory assurances from her, the protestant lords met at Edinburgh in October and elected a council of authority, to which Wishart was chosen. They drew up a manifesto in which it was declared that Mary of Guise had forfeited the office of Regent. In February 1560 he attended as commissioner the convention of Berwick, where the Duke of Norfolk, on behalf of Queen Elizabeth I, agreed to support the Lords of the Congregation with military force. In April the English army reached Edinburgh, and Wishart was prominent in welcoming it and promising co-operation. On 11 April he took part in a conference with the English envoys.

Wishart was named one of the commissioners of burghs in the Reformation parliament held at Edinburgh on 1 August 1560. and on 10 August he was chosen a temporal lord of the articles. This parliament ratified the confession of faith. The government of the state in the interval between the death of the queen regent and the arrival of Mary, Queen of Scots was entrusted to a body of fourteen chosen from twenty-four persons nominated by parliament, of whom six, including Wishart, were selected by the nobility, and eight by Mary. On 24 January 1562 he was appointed a commissioner to value ecclesiastical property, with a view to compelling the clergy to surrender a third of their revenues for the support of the royal household. On 8 February 1562, he was knighted on the occasion of the marriage of the queen's brother James Stewart, who was at that time Earl of Mar, and Annas Keith.

On 1 March he was appointed comptroller and collector-general of teinds, He became a member of the privy council. where, however, he had sat as early as 6 December 1560. In this capacity he became paymaster of the reformed clergy, many of whom resented the scantiness of their stipends. According to Knox, the saying was current, "The good laird of Pittarro was ane earnest professour of Christ; but the mekle Devill receave the comptrollar". Wishart appointed a kinsman George Wishart of Drymme as a sub-collector, and his account includes payments made by Mary to Knox and his servants.

Wishart distinguished himself at the battle of Corrichie, near Aberdeen, on 5 November 1562, by his services against the followers of the Earl of Huntly. In the parliament held at Edinburgh on 5 June 1563 he was one of those appointed to determine who should be included in the act of oblivion for offences committed between 6 March 1558 and 1 September 1560. In August 1563, he helped restore order at Holyrood Palace after a riot against the Catholic Mass.

John Knox told a story about the last words of Lord John Stewart in 1563, a half-brother of Mary, Queen of Scots. Someone told her that Lord John's deathbed wish was that she would become a Protestant. Mary declared without hesitation that this was a lie invented by Wishart and her brother Moray's secretary John Wood.

Pitarrow and his wife Janet Falconer dined with the English diplomat Thomas Randolph and the Earl of Moray on 27 February 1564. Pitarrow hoped Mary would marry "a good Christian" and "both the realms to live in friendship". When Mary made a progress to the north of Scotland in 1564, royal letters were carried between his house at Pitarrow and Edinburgh.

== Rebellion against Mary, Queen of Scots ==
Between 1557 and July 1565 he grants of lands in Aberdeenshire and Kincardine. But his fortunes met with a sudden reverse. According to Knox, the queen hated him "because he flattered her not in her dancing and other things". In August 1565 he joined the Earl of Moray in opposing Mary's marriage with Henry Stuart, Lord Darnley. He was denounced as a rebel, and compelled to fly to England, where he remained until the assassination of David Rizzio on 9 March 1566 and the alienation of Mary from Darnley enabled him to return. He received a royal pardon on 21 March, but he did not recover the office of comptroller, which was held by William Murray of Tullibardine and Robert Boyd, 5th Lord Boyd, was made Collector of the Thirds.

In 1567 he joined the confederacy against the Earl of Bothwell, and on 25 July subscribed the articles in the general assembly. On 19 November he was appointed an extraordinary lord of session, and in October 1568 accompanied the regent Moray to York to support his charges against Mary. He preserved his loyalty during the Earl of Huntly's rebellion in 1568, and was appointed an arbitrator in regard to the compensation to be made to those who had suffered by it. Before Moray's assassination in January 1570, however, he had left his party, and attached himself to that of the Duke of Châtelherault. He was however nominated as one of Moray's executors. In 1570 he was protected from debts incurred during his term of office as comptroller by an act of the privy council. In February 1572–3 he was appointed in the pacification between Châtelherault and the Earl of Morton one of the arbitrators to see that the conditions were carried out north of the Tay.

As Laird of Pitarrow, he is sometimes confused with Henry Echlin of Pittadro, who was at this time the Constable of Edinburgh Castle with William Kirkcaldy of Grange. On 11 July 1573, Wishart was denounced as a rebel for not paying a debt, and his lands and goods conferred on his nephew John Wishart, "son to Mr James Wishart of Balfeith". He was also deprived of his judicial office, but on 18 January 1574 he was reappointed an extraordinary lord of session, and on 20 March took his seat in the privy council.

Wishart died on 25 September 1576. He married Janet Falconer, sister of Sir Alexander Falconer of Halkerton in Kincardineshire, they had no children. He was succeeded in his estates by his nephew John Wishart, eldest son of James Wishart of Balfeith.

In 1573 John Davidson dedicated to Wishart his poem on Knox, Ane Brief Commendatiovn of Vprichtnes. The English ambassador Thomas Randolph had a very high opinion of Wishart, and described him as "a man mervileus wyse, discryte, and godly, withowte spotte or wryncle." Wishart was one of those wittily portrayed in Thomas Maitland's squib representing a conference of the lords with the regent Moray.

== Bibliography ==
- Caylyle, Edward (1900). "Wishart, John" . In Lee, Sidney (ed.). Dictionary of National Biography. Vol. 62. London: Smith, Elder & Co.
