= Magdalen Livingstone =

Scottish courtier

- Died: 2 March 1613
- Spouse: Arthur Erskine of Blackgrange (m. 1562; died 1571) James Scrimgeour (m. 1577; died 1612)
- Parents: Alexander Livingston, 5th Lord Livingston (father); Agnes Douglas (mother)

Magdalen Livingstone (floruit 1560–1613) was a Scottish courtier. She was a favoured lady-in-waiting to Mary, Queen of Scots, and later was a member of the household of Prince Henry.

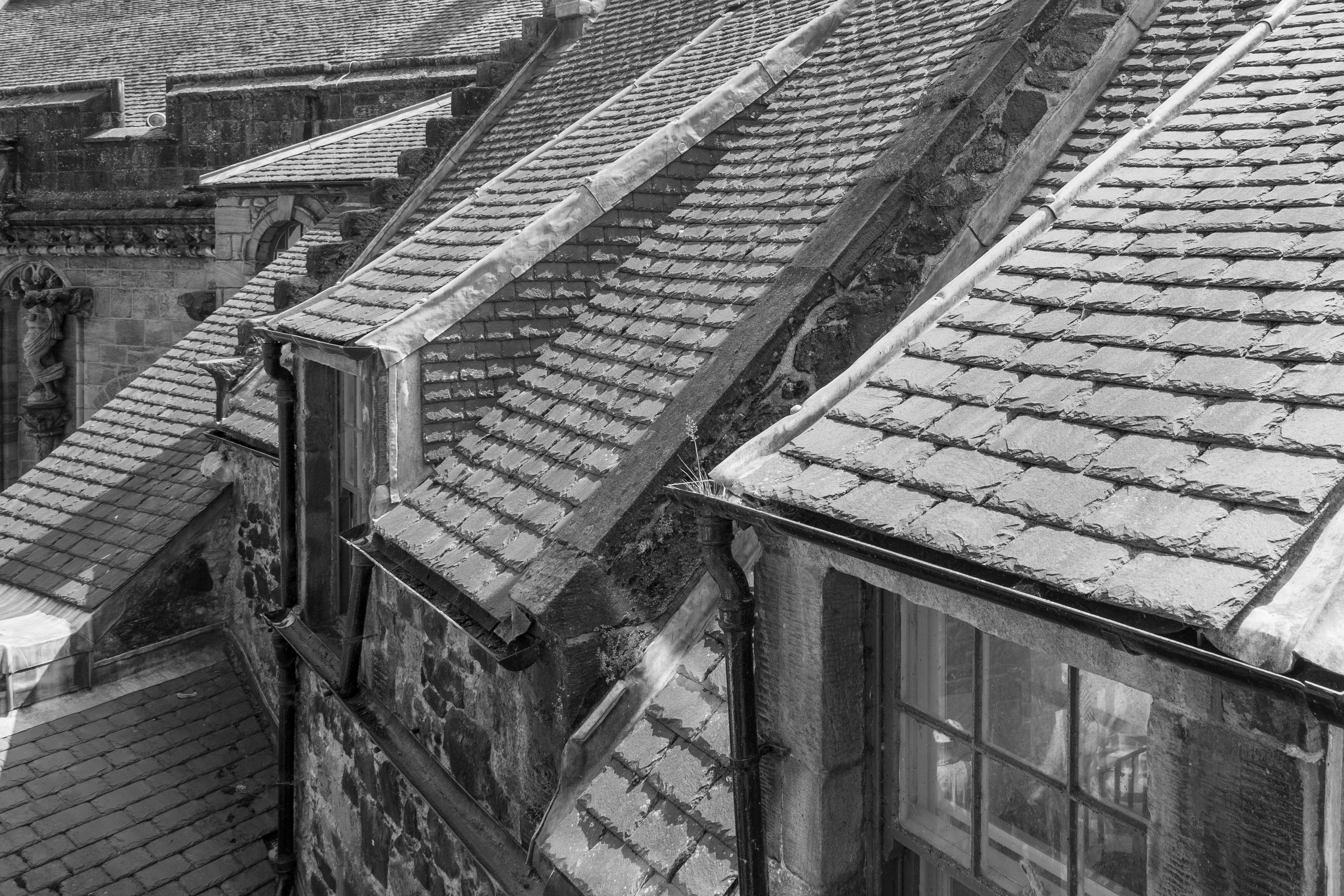
Magdalen Livingstone had a chamber at Stirling Castle

== Mary, Queen of Scots ==
She was a daughter of Alexander Livingston, 5th Lord Livingston and Agnes Douglas, daughter of John Douglas, 2nd Earl of Morton. Her older sister Mary Livingston was also a lady-in-waiting of the queen, and one of the well-known "four Maries."

She was a lady-in-waiting to Mary, Queen of Scots until 1567. She was for a time highly in favour among the queen's courtier. She appears as "young Livingstone" with the other maidens in the household menu of 1562. The other maids of honour in 1566 were Lucrece Beaton, who married David Beaton of Melgund, Mademoiselle de Thoré (or Nicolas Wardlaw), and Barbara Sandilands.

Her first husband was Arthur Erskine of Blackgrange, a son of John Erskine, 5th Lord Erskine. The queen gave her a skirt of cloth of gold and matching sleeves for her wedding in January 1562. In May 1563 Mary gave her a black taffeta gown with wide sleeves bordered with velvet.

When Mary was pregnant, assisted by Mary Livingstone, she made a will bequeathing her jewels to her family and courtiers. If she died, Magdalen, as the "younger Livingstone", would receive a set of 65 gold clothing points, a parure of jewelled front and back pieces for a coif with a matching belt and necklace, a chain, and a watch set with rubies and two sapphires.

=== Mary at Jedburgh ===
Arthur Erskine, who was a gentleman of the royal stables with Anthony Standen, helped the queen escape from Holyrood Palace to Seton after the murder of David Rizzio in March 1566. Erskine and Magdalen Livingston stayed at Dryburgh with his kinsman David Erskine, Commendator of Dryburgh on the 9 and 10 of October 1566 before riding to Jedburgh to join Mary, Queen of Scots. While Mary was at Jedburgh, she rode to Hermitage Castle to visit the Earl of Bothwell. Afterward Mary become ill, and stayed at Jedburgh. Fruits considered as medicine, including pomegranates and lemons or limes, were sent from Edinburgh for the queen.

=== James VI at Stirling Castle ===
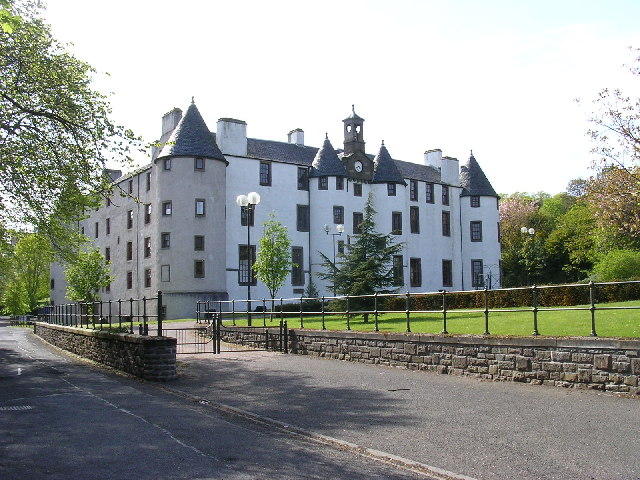
Magdalen Livingstone lived at Dudhope Castle

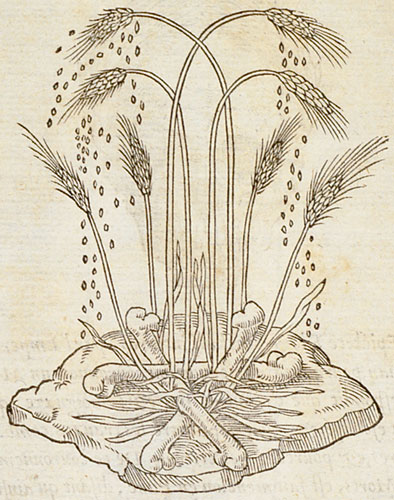
Paradin's emblem "Spes Alterae Vitae"

When Mary gave linen to her household for Easter in 1567, Magdalen was named in the account as "Madame Dasquin", among the "dames", the ladies. Magdalen Livingstone was involved in the upbringing of James VI at Stirling Castle and gave the king several books, including a Latin and French dictionary, a French manuscript of the second book of the Illiad, an illustrated Book of Maccabees, and the illustrated Metamorphoses and the Devises Heroïques of Claude Paradin. He gave her an English psalm book. An inventory of Stirling Castle made in 1585 mentions "Maidlane Levingstoun's" chamber or bedchamber in the castle.

== Lady Dudhope ==
After the death of Arthur Erskine, she married Sir James Scrimgeour of Dudhope in 1577, and was known as "Lady Dudhope". Prior to the marriage, Scrimgeour gave her the lands of the Mains of Dudhope with Dudhope Mill, with a promise or "warrandice" of three properties near Liff; the lands and mill at Benvie, the lands, mill, and gardens at Balruddery, a part of the barony of Panmure; and the lands and mill of Bullion, also near Liff, and a part of the barony of Melgund.

Their initials were carved in several places on Dudhope Castle. One stone carved with her initials and the Livingstone arms was dated 1600. This marriage "infinitely" displeased Mary, Queen of Scots, who wrote to cancel a present previously ordered for "Magdelaine Levingston".

== Anne of Denmark and Prince Henry ==
Magdalen, Lady Dudhope was appointed in 1589 to welcome Anne of Denmark to Scotland at the shore of Leith with Annabell Murray, Countess of Mar, Lady Seton, Lady Boyne, and Lady Thirlestane.

With her niece Margaret Livingstone, Countess of Orkney, widow of the Justice Clerk Lewis Bellenden, she was appointed a lady in waiting at Stirling Castle in the household of Prince Henry in 1594. The other "dames of honour" at Stirling were; Annabell Murray, Countess of Mar, Marie Stewart, Countess of Mar, Agnes Leslie, Countess of Morton, Lady Clackmannan, Lady Abercairny, and Lady Cambuskenneth.

Scrimgeour died on 13 July 1612 at Holyrood Palace, in the lodging of Christian Lindsay, poet and baker, wife of William Murray, Master of the carriage.

== Death ==
Magdalen Livingstone died on 2 March 1613.

Her inventory of goods included a golden belt with a gold knop; a chain of pearls; a "carcat" necklace of pearls with five gold pieces set with rubies and a diamond; a gold locket or "tablet" set with two diamonds and two rubies with a pearl worth £100; a great gold tablet or locket with the portrait of Anne of Denmark raised in relief, set "in the circuit" around with 9 diamonds and 11 rubies, worth £100 (perhaps a gold medal made after a portrait by Adrian Vanson); with diamond rings and bracelets. She left the locket with the queen's portrait to her nephew the Earl of Linlithgow, and other jewels and clothes to Margaret Semple, daughter of her sister Mary Livingston.

King James came to Dudhope Castle on 21 May 1617.
