= David Seton of Parbroath =

Scottish courtier and administrator

David Seton of Parbroath (died 1601) was a Scottish courtier and administrator.

== Family background ==
He was the son of Gilbert Seton of Parbroath and Helen Leslie, a daughter of the Earl of Rothes. Gilbert Seton was killed during the battle of Pinkie in 1547, making him successor to his grandfather Andrew Seton of Parbroath (died 1563).

His home was Parbroath Castle in Creich, Fife. His surname was sometimes written "Seyton" or Seytoun". In 1566, David Seton made a contract to marry Nicholas Wardlaw, a gentlewoman in the household of Mary, Queen of Scots, in 1566, but instead she married Patrick Wood of Bonnyton.

== Career in royal finance ==
In March 1588 he was made keeper of the East and West Lomond Hills of Fife, hills near Falkland Palace. He was Comptroller of Scotland, in charge of a branch of royal finance and expenses of the household from November 1588 to 1597. On 25 May 1590 he was made Chamberlain of Dunfermline for Anne of Denmark, an office which passed to William Schaw. The position of comptroller left him with debts.

Seton audited an account of money spent during James VI's voyage to Norway and Denmark by the Chancellor, John Maitland. Maitland passed the remaining Danish dowry money given to James VI to Seton. He invested it with several Scottish "burghs" or towns at 10% interest. James VI withdrew the money by 1594, much of it to finance the masque at the baptism of Prince Henry.

In May 1590 Seton drew up a rental of the income and expenditure of the lands of Dunfermline Abbey for the benefit of two Danish ambassadors, Steen Bille and Niels Krag, who came to Scotland to assess Anna of Denmark's marriage settlement. Outgoings include the wages of several kirk ministers and of John Gibb, keeper of Dunfermline Palace and others.

On 6 May 1593 the Duke of Lennox and 15 friends including Seton subscribed to a frivolous legal document swearing to abstain from wearing gold and silver trimmings on their clothes for a year, and defaulters were to pay for a banquet for all of them at John Killoch's house in Edinburgh. This "passement bond" was in part inspired by cheap counterfeit gold and silver thread used in "passements great or small, plain or à jour, bissets, lilykins, cordons, and fringes" which quickly discoloured. The signatories included; Lord Home, the Earl of Mar, Lord Spynie, the Master of Glamis, Sir Thomas Erskine, Walter Stewart of Blantyre, William Keith of Delny, and Sir George Home.

In 1593 he was involved in a boundary dispute at Torwood forest with John Drummond of Slipperfield, father of the poet William Drummond of Hawthornden. The Torwood belonged the lands of the Chapel Royal and had a boundary with Forrester's Mansion, or Torwood Castle. Alexander Forrester of Garden assembled a company of armed men to intimidate commissioners intending to walk the boundary.

In December 1593, David Seton was appointed to a committee to audit the account of money spent by the Chancellor, John Maitland of Thirlestane, on the royal voyages. The funds in question came from the English subsidy and the dowry of Anne of Denmark. In 1594 the Parliament of Scotland recognised that he was "superexpended" in his comptrollery account by £8,297 Scots.

He died in 1601.

== The Seton portrait miniature of Mary, Queen of Scots ==
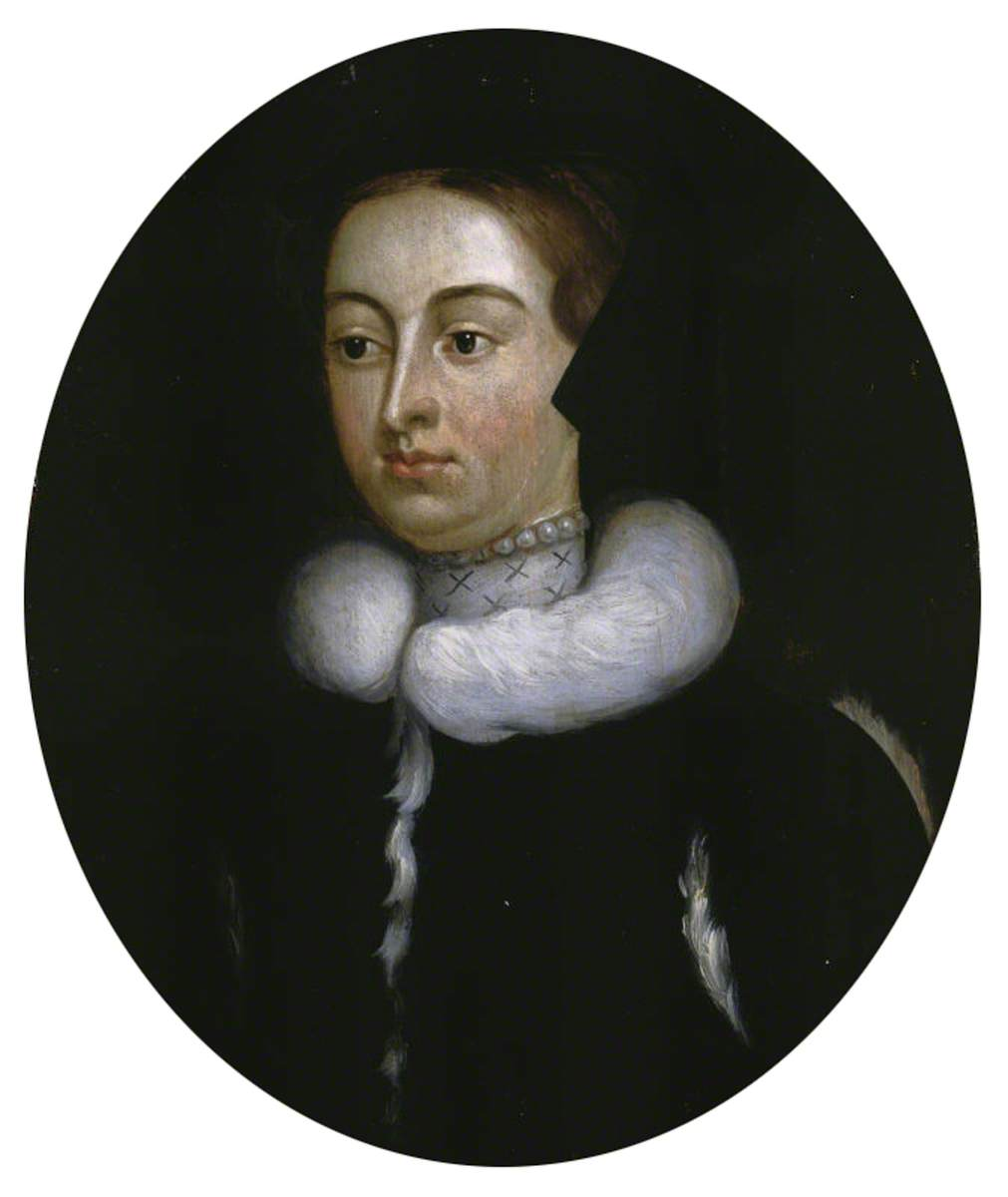
Portrait of Mary, Queen of Scots at Lyme Park

The author Robert Seton mentions a portrait miniature of Mary, Queen of Scots that descended in the family from David Seton of Parbroath. The queen's hair is "Titian gold", the background is dark blue, with the inscription, "Maria Regina Scotorum". The image of the queen resembles another portrait called "Mary, Queen of Scots" at Lyme Park made in the 18th century. The Lyme image was probably taken from a mezzotint engraving by John Simon made around the year 1715. Simon's model was a sixteenth-century miniature which belonged to James Hamilton, 4th Duke of Hamilton. Another example of this portrait belonged to William Maule of Panmure and was engraved for the frontispiece of State Papers of Ralph Sadler, 2 (1809). The woman depicted in these images does not look like accepted portraits of the queen.

== Marriage and children ==
David Seton married circa 1590 Mary Gray, daughter of Patrick Gray, 5th Lord Gray and Barbara Ruthven. Their children included:

- George Seton of Parbroath, who married Jean Sinclair
- John Seton, who emigrated to the Virginia Colony in 1635.
- Margaret Seton, who married John Scrimgeour, a son of James Scrimgeour of Dudhope, Constable of Dundee. As "Lady Dudhope" she was a friend of Jane Drummond, Countess of Roxburghe, who bought her clothes and visited her at Dudhope in 1619.
- Mary Seton, who married David Skene of Potterton, and became ancestors of the family of Skene of Rubislaw.
- Elizabeth Seton.
