= Clan Forrester =

Lowland Scottish clan

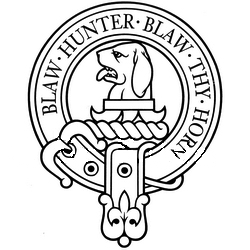
- Crest: A hound's head erased Proper collared Gules
- Motto: Blaw, Hunter, Blaw Thy Horn

Profile
- Region: Lowlands
- District: Lothian, Stirlingshire
- Animal: Hound
- Clan Forrester no longer has a chief, and is an armigerous clan
- Historic seat: Corstorphine Castle; Torwood Castle
- Last Chief: William Forrester, 7th Lord Forrester
- Died: 1763
Septs of Clan Forrester
Forrester, Forester, Foristar, Forrister, Forrest, Forest, Forster, Forstar, Foster, Fostar, Corstorphine, Carstarphen
Clan branches
Forrester of Corstorphine (chiefs)
Forrester of Torwood
Forrester of Garden
Forrester of Niddry
Forrester of Strathendry
Le Forestier du Buisson-SainteMarquerite
Le Forestier de Foucrainville
Allied clans
Clan Douglas

The Forresters are an ancient and noble clan of the Scottish Lowlands.

The clan took their name from their ancient role as guardians of the royal forest. The Forresters had significant holdings in Lothian, and Stirlingshire. The clan does not currently have a chief and is therefore considered an armigerous clan.

The clan is likely related to the English Forresters of Etherstone and later Forsters of Bamburgh, sharing the same bugle-horned arms.

The original caput of the clan is believed to have been Torwood Castle in Stirlingshire, as well as Corstorphine Castle on the outskirts of Edinburgh. Many clan chiefs and Lords Forrester are interred in Corstorphine Church.

== History ==
=== Origins of the clan ===
It is possible that the chiefs of Clan Forrester were of Celtic origin, descending from Marnin the Forrester who in about 1200 held lands in Dunipace, Stirlingshire. The chiefs may also have English origin through the Forresters of Adderstone.

The founder of the clan is generally regarded as Sir Adam Forrester, 1st of Corstorphine who was an ambassador, merchant, Provost of Edinburgh, Keeper of the Great Seal of Scotland and Deputy Chamberlain of Scotland. In 1376 he acquired the estate of Corstorphine in Midlothian which is now part of Edinburgh. It was here that Corstorphine Castle (now demolished) stood as well as the Collegiate church of Corstorphine, which has the effigies of three of the Forrester chiefs.

Sir Adam Forrester's son, Sir John Forrester the elder, was also Keeper of the Great Seal of Scotland and Chamberlain of Scotland. He was also Keeper of the Household to James I of Scotland. According to historian Alexander Mackenzie, a historic manuscript states that Gerse or Grace, sister of Sir John Forrester of Corstorphine, married Robert de Munro, 8th Baron of Foulis.

=== Wars of Scottish Independence ===
During the Wars of Scottish Independence Forresters fought at the Battle of Halidon Hill in 1333. They also fought at the Battle of Sauchieburn in the 15th century.

=== 16th century and Anglo-Scottish Wars ===
The chief's family had several landed cadet branches. Amongst them was Sir John Forrester of Niddry who died at the Battle of Flodden in 1513.

There was a Stirlingshire branch of the clan, the Forresters of Garden who were heritable keepers of the Torwood (a Royal forest and hunting ground). They owned the barony of Garden as well as Torwood and the ruins of Torwood Castle still stand. Sir Duncan Forrester, 1st of Torwood was Comptroller of the Royal Household for James IV of Scotland. No fewer than eight Forresters of Torwood were Provosts of Stirling burgh.

Sir James Forrester, seventh chief of Clan Forrester was killed at the Battle of Pinkie Cleugh in 1547, as was Sir David Forrester, 4th of the Torwood branch of the clan.

A cadet of the Forresters of Garden was the first of the Fifeshire Chieftains, the Forresters of Strathendry. The Forresters of Strathendry built Strathendry Castle, a 16th-century tower house where both Mary, Queen of Scots and Oliver Cromwell stayed. It is the only Forrester stronghold that is still inhabited today.

=== 17th century and Civil War ===
Sir George Forrester, tenth chief of Clan Forrester was appointed a Baronet of Nova Scotia in 1633, however when he died the baronetcy became dormant and still awaits a claimant. James and William Baillie who were the sons-in-law of the first Lord Forrester assumed the name and arms of Forrester and inherited the title under a re-grant of the peerage. James was a royalist and was fined by Oliver Cromwell with his estates becoming burdened in debt. In 1679 he was murdered by his mistress, Mrs Christian Nimmo and his brother who was mad then inherited the title.

=== 18th century and Jacobite risings ===
Colonel George Forrester, the fifth Lord Forrester who was in the Grenadier and Life Guards fought under the Duke of Marlborough against the French at the Battle of Oudenarde in 1708 and the Battle of Malplaquet in 1709. During the Jacobite rising of 1715 he was wounded at the Battle of Preston (1715). Eventually the male line died out and the title descended through an heiress to the Earls of Verulam.

== In France ==
Two cadet branches of the chief's family in Normandy, France are Le Forestier du Buisson Sainte-Marguerite and Le Forestier de Foucrainville who descend from Sir Adam Forrester of the 14th century. As of 1994 the head of these French branches is M. Jean Le Forrester. The Le Forestier cadets fought at the Battle of Ivry in France in 1590.

== Chief ==
The Lords Forrester had for a long time been the recognized chiefs of Clan Forrester. The potential chief is therefore Sir John Duncan Grimston, Baronet, seventh Earl Verulam, sixteenth Lord Forrester of Corstorpine and patron of the Clan Forrester, although he would have to assume the surname of Forrester to become the chief.

== Castles ==
- Corstorphine Castle, the seat of the chiefs, to the west of Edinburgh was a large and powerful castle with a strong wall, moat and corner towers but nothing now remains apart from a large doocot.
- Torwood Castle, four miles north-west of Falkirk, was seat of the Forresters of Torwood, a sixteenth century L-plan tower house it is now a ruin.
- Tower of Garden, three and a half miles west of Kippen, Stirlingshire, was held by the Forresters of Garden. It was replaced by a classical mansion in 1824 and there are no remains of the old tower.
- Strathendry Castle, near Cardenden, Fife was originally held by the Strathendry family but passed to the Forresters of Garden and Skipinich in 1496.
- Blairlogie Castle, three and a half miles north-west of Stirling, still under ownership of members of the clan and seat of the DeForests of Blairlogie, a sixteenth century tower house and gardens, expanded in the 1580s and again in the 1890s.

== Profile ==
- Motto: Blaw, hunter, Blaw Thy Horn.
- Crest: A hound's head erased Proper collared Gules.
- Patron: Earl of Veralum, 16th Lord Forrester of Corstorphine.
- Arms: Argent, three bugle horns Sable, garnished Vert and stringed Gules.
- Supporters: Dexter, a ratchhound Proper, collared Gules; sinister a ratchhound Proper, collared Gules.

== See also ==
- Scottish clan
- Armigerous clan
