= John Kinloch (post master) =

Scottish post master in 16th-century Edinburgh

John Kinloch or Killoch was keeper of the royal tennis courts, a post master and stable owner in 16th-century Edinburgh and the proprietor of house used for lodgings and banquets near Holyrood Palace.

== Career ==
John Kinloch was a son or relative of Henry Kinloch, a merchant burgess of the Canongate. Their house gave the former name "Kinloch's Close" to a site more recently known as Brodie's Close at the foot of the Canongate, close to the Palace. The 19th-century historian Daniel Wilson connected the name of another Kinloch's close, further west up the street from the palace, near New Street, to Henry Kinloch and the entertainment of the French ambassador in 1565, which seems a less likely location, and their tennis court is now thought to have been at the bottom of the Canongate, south of the Girth Cross.

Henry Kinloch hosted the French ambassador Nicholas d'Angennes, seigneur de Rambouillet in February 1566. The ambassador was entertained at Holyrood Palace by Mary, Queen of Scots in "maskrie and mumschance" during which her ladies were dressed in men's apparel. The visit caused some scandal in the Canongate. Marion Cowan said that Isobel Kincaid had dressed herself and her servant men's clothes and passed to the French ambassador. There was said to be list of prostitutes who had visited the ambassador. One of Kinloch's servants, Katherine Lenton, was accused of "harlotry" during the French ambassador's visit and attracted the attention of the Kirk Session and was banished from the Canongate.

There was banquet in Kinloch's House to celebrate the wedding of the Earl of Bothwell and Jean Gordon on 24 February 1566. The ambassador of Savoy, Jean, Count de Brienne, arrived in Edinburgh on 2 November 1566 and was lodged in Henry Kinloch's house in the Canongate. He went to Stirling on 12 December for the baptism of Prince James, escorted by George Seton, 7th Lord Seton. Another French ambassador, Philibert Le Voyer, sieur de Lignerolles, stayed in August 1567.

Henry Killoch was paid for supplying wine and balls, presumably tennis balls, to Mary and Darnley. Kinloch's tennis court was mentioned in a legal case in 1563. In the 17th-century Alexander Peiris offered lodgings and built or rebuilt a tennis court near Holyrood Palace in 1623, his guests included Anne Halkett, and he may have taken over the Kinloch's establishment or had a similar business.

John Kinloch, probably Henry's son, was a goldsmith in the Canongate. On 17 April 1582 James VI made John Killoch and Robert Schaw keepers of the royal tennis courts, called "caichpollis", throughout Scotland. They were to supply balls and rackets to the value of £100 and also receive a yearly fee of £40.

== Kinloch's House, diplomats, and the royal marriage ==
The English ambassador, Edward Wotton was lodged in Kinloch's house in May 1585. In September 1589 when Anne of Denmark, the bride of James VI of Scotland was expected to arrive in Scotland, it was planned that the Danish officers and ambassadors who came with her would be lodged in houses in the Canongate of Edinburgh. Three Danish ambassadors were to be lodged in John Kinloch's house, while the vice-admiral Peder Munk would stay in Robert Cunningham's house. The costs and expenses of these lodgings were to be overseen by the Lord Justice Clerk Lewis Bellenden (who resided in the Canongate) and Andrew Keith, Lord Dingwall, while Sir James Chisholm, a master of the royal household, would act as host. Anne of Denmark stayed in Norway and Denmark over winter, and the Danish ambassadors came in May 1590. Kinloch's intended guests were probably Steen Bille, Breide Rantzau, and Niels Krag or Henrik Gyldenstierne. Despite some refurbishment of Holyrood Palace over the winter, Kinloch's house would still be required in May, and the king sent orders from Kronborg that Kinloch's house should be "plenished and entertained" with other lodgings about the palace, by the comptroller David Seton of Parbroath. During the coronation of Anne of Denmark, the English ambassador, the Earl of Worcester, was lodged in the house.

On 6 May 1593 the Duke of Lennox and 15 friends subscribed to a frivolous legal document swearing to abstain from wearing gold and silver trimmings on their clothes for a year, and defaulters were to pay for a banquet for all the signatories at John Killoch's house. This "passement bond" was in part inspired by cheap counterfeit gold and silver thread used in "passements great or small, plain or à jour, bissets, lilykins, cordons, and fringes" which quickly discoloured. The signatories included; Lord Home, the Earl of Mar, Lord Spynie, the Master of Glamis, Sir Thomas Erskine, Walter Stewart of Blantyre, Sir George Home, David Seton of Parbroath, and Sir William Keith of Delny. It is not known if the banquet was held, but it is clear that Killoch's house had a suite suitable for a large banquet, perhaps like that in the house of the wealthy merchant John MacMorran.

Two Danish ambassadors, Steen Bille and Niels Krag lodged at Kinloch's house in the summer of 1593. James Melville of Halhill, a gentleman of Anne of Denmark's chamber, visited them to discuss the second Raid of Holyrood. Andrew Sinclair told a Scottish merchant that Christian IV of Denmark was coming to Scotland in 1597 and Anne of Denmark should prepare a lodging in Kinloch's house near the gates of Holyrood Palace. Christian IV did not visit Scotland.

James VI came to Edinburgh from Falkland Palace in July 1602 and stayed a night at John Kinloch's house and the next day after dinner moved to John Preston's house. After these two nights he returned to Falkland.

== English visitors at the Union of the Crowns ==
After the death of Elizabeth I, James VI became King of England, and travelled to London, an event known as the Union of the Crowns. In May 1603 Lucy Russell and Frances Howard, Countess of Kildare came to Scotland from Berwick ahead of a party of gentlewomen appointed by the English Privy Council, and got audiences with the Anne of Denmark. The queen came from Stirling Castle to Holyrood Palace with English ladies who had come seeking attendance and on 31 May 1603 attended church in Edinburgh accompanied by these would-be companions. Some of the ladies stayed at John Kinloch's house in Edinburgh, and the treasurer of Scotland, John Graham, 3rd Earl of Montrose wrote to the king to ask for payment for the ladies' lodgings, and for horses used for the post and the convoy of Anne of Denmark to England.

== Postmaster ==
Killoch appeared before the Privy Council of Scotland and made an obligation to supply post horses for the king's messages. He was to keep two horses exclusively for the royal mail, keep a ledger of the official packets of letters, have two leather mail bags, and two post horns.

The Duke of Lennox was in Scotland as High Commissioner of the Parliament from July 1607. He stayed at first at Holyrood Palace, and later lodged in John Kinloch's house in Edinburgh in September and October, on 8 October the Duke had breakfast at Kinloch's and then rode to Dunipace and his servants distributed coins to the poor of the Canongate and Leith Wynd foot. His master cook William Murkie had worked for Anne of Denmark.

John Killoch and his wife Janet Gray lost the ownership of his property near the Holyrood asylum cross on 11 September 1608. Business apparently remained the same, Theophilus Howard, Lord Walden stayed in "John Killoch's house" in 1613.

By 1617, John Killoch's position as post master had been taken by Henry Killoch, who was probably his son. In July 1617 Andrew Abernethy of Glencorse assembled 43 horses at Holyrood to carry the king's trunks to Dunbar. He left his own horse unattended tied to a cart in the palace yard and went to speak to the Master of the King's Carriage, William Murray, husband of the noted baker and poet Christian Lindsay. He returned to find the horse gone and spent £12 asking locals who the thief, a man with a red coat was, to learn it was the postmaster Henry Kinloch and his servant John Forres. The Privy Council found that Henry Killoch had no right to take horses as postmaster and should return the horse, worth £60 Scots, or give Abernethy £50.
