= David Erskine, Commendator of Dryburgh =

Scottish landowner

David Erskine, Commandator of Dryburgh was a Scottish landowner.

He was a son of Robert Erskine, Master of Erskine, a brother of John Erskine, Lord Erskine, and Jean Home.

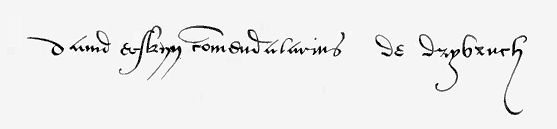
Signature of David Erskine, as Commendator of Dryburgh

In 1556 his uncle, the Earl of Mar, installed him as Commendator of Dryburgh Abbey and Inchmahome Priory, positions securing him a large income. His cousin Adam Erskine was made Commendator of Cambuskenneth.

Erskine's surviving accounts show that his kinsman Arthur Erskine of Blackgrange and his wife Magdalen Livingstone stayed at Dryburgh on the 9 and 10 of October 1566 before riding to Jedburgh to join Mary, Queen of Scots.

On 21 March 1567 he witnessed and signed an inventory of guns and artillery equipment at Edinburgh Castle. The occasion of making the inventory was that his uncle, now Earl of Mar, resigned responsibility for the castle to James Balfour of Pittendreich. In a formal ceremony, Erskine, with John Cunningham of Drumquhassil, Alexander Erskine of Gogar, Alexander Forrester of Garden, and Archibald Haldane, Constable of Edinburgh Castle, gave the castle keys to James Cockburn of Skraling.

In May 1585 his wife, Margaret Haldane, was held at Kildrummy Castle in the custody of the Master of Elphinstone. Francis Walsingham, at the instance of her brother, wrote to Edward Wotton, an English diplomat in Edinburgh, to ask that she be moved to more congenial location. For a time, William Stewart of Caverston, was made Commendator of Dryburgh.

In 1590 Jean Fleming, Lady Thirlestane paid him £132 Scots for the teind of Lauder.

David Erskine died on 28 May 1611. Margaret Haldane, Lady Dryburgh, died on 13 January 1618.
