= Anthony Standen (spy) =

English spy (c. 1548–??)

Anthony or Antony Standen (b. c. 1548 – d. ?) was an English servant of Henry Stuart, Lord Darnley at the Scottish court. As an English Catholic exile he became a spy or intelligencer. Standen was recruited by Francis Walsingham and, using an alias Pompeo Pellegrini, provided critical information about preparations for the Spanish Armada. Imprisoned in the Tower of London in 1604, Standen wrote a short account of his adventures.

== Two brothers at the Scottish court ==
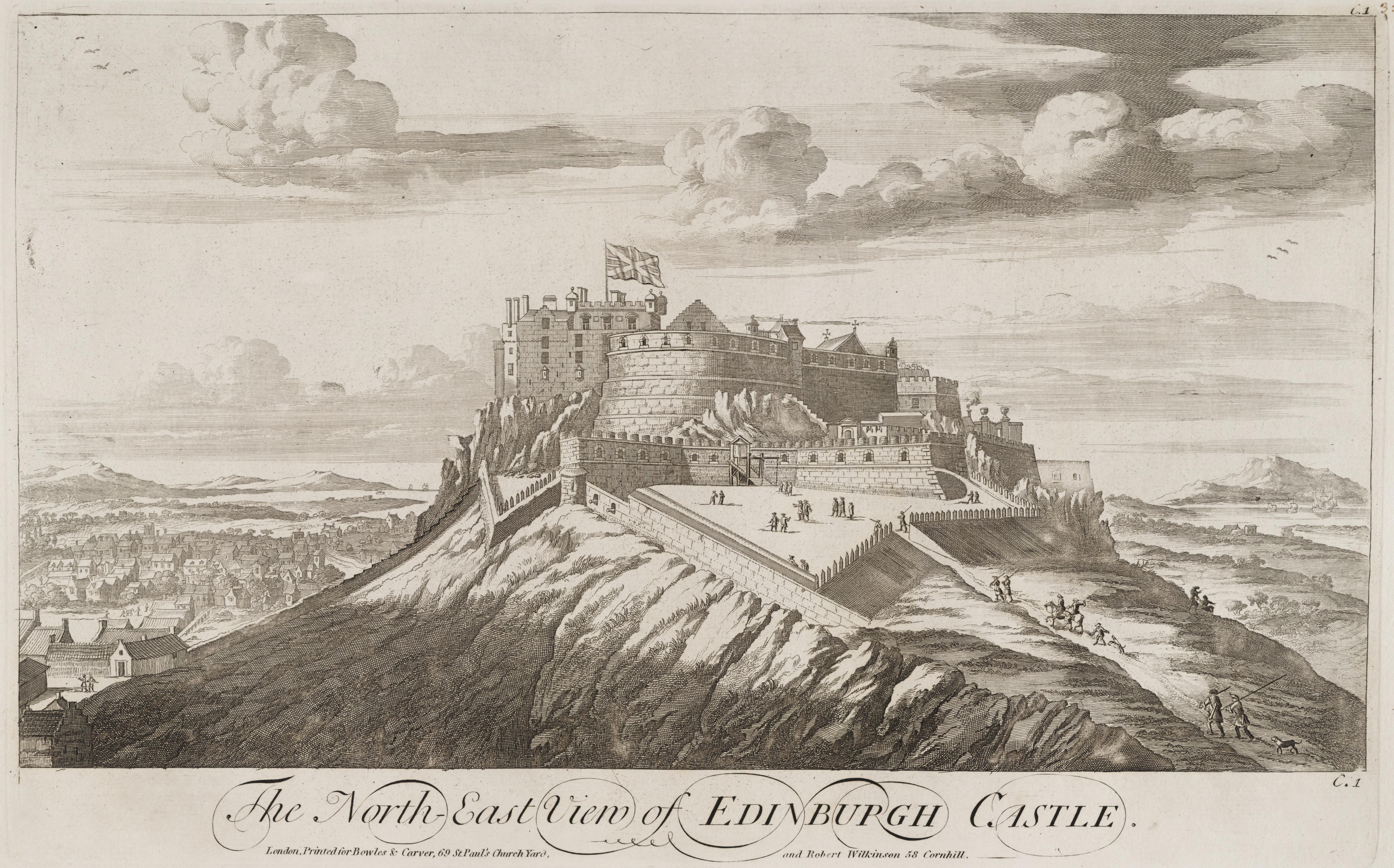
Standen was welcomed by Mary, Queen of Scots at Edinburgh Castle

Standen was a "goodly tall fair man with flaxen hair and beard". According to his own accounts, in 1565 Standen came to Scotland at the instance of Margaret Douglas, Countess of Lennox, and was appointed an equerry of the royal stable, or Master of the Horse, to Mary, Queen of Scots and Lord Darnley. Mary asked her wardrobe staff to make a mattress and bedding for Standen in July 1565 at the time of her wedding, and the accounts identify him as "Standy, escuyer de l'ecuyie du Roy".

His younger brother, also called Anthony, was made a cupbearer at Mary's table. Both Standen brothers received a fee as members of the Scottish court in 1566. The Standen brothers did not have permission to travel outside of England and were regarded with disdain by English diplomats. Their father, Edmund Standen, wrote to them in January 1566, hoping their friends in Scotland might cause Elizabeth I to think better of them.

In October 1565 the English sailor Anthony Jenkinson was sent in the Ayde to Scotland during the political crisis of the Chaseabout Raid. He sailed into the Firth of Forth on 25 September 1565. His mission was to blockade Leith to prevent Lord Seton landing munitions for Mary sent from France. An adverse wind brought him within range of the cannon of the fortress isle of Inchkeith. Jenkinson had been ordered not to declare that he had been sent by the English government, and said he was looking for pirates. Mary, Queen of Scots sent aboard Anthony Standen and his brother with a present of a bow and arrows and a "box of conserve" for Queen Elizabeth, with a gold chain and gilt cup for the captain. Jenkinson considered capturing Standen, and the English diplomat Thomas Randolph wished the ship had been blown back to England with Standen.

== After the murder of David Rizzio ==
Standen wrote that he helped Queen Mary during the murder of David Rizzio and the subsequent events at Holyrood Palace. He accompanied Darnley to the queen's bedchamber before the conspirators gained access. He claimed to have grabbed the wrists of "Pety Balentyne" (Patrick Bellenden of Stenhouse), a servant of Lord Ruthven, who threatened Mary with a dagger. Bellenden was the brother of the Justice Clerk, John Bellenden.

When the royal couple escaped from Holyrood, Standen accompanied them to Seton Palace and Dunbar Castle. Arthur Erskine of Blackgrange and John Stewart of Traquair, a captain of the royal guard, also escorted Mary and Darnley to safety. Standen said that Mary spoke to the three of them in her bedchamber before they secretly left the palace after midnight. He wrote that Mary's female servant, a chamberer, rode behind him. The servant is sometimes identified as Margaret Carwood.

A French report mentions the captain of the guard and that royals rode behind the escuier, meaning Arthur Erskine. Claude Nau's account of these events did not emphasise Standen's role. Nau wrote that Mary planned the escape with Traquair, who passed the details on to Blackgrange, and a servant or valet of the king's bedchamber, possibly meaning Standen, with two or three soldiers completed the group riding to Dunbar.

Lord Herries' Memoirs seem to mention Standen as "William Stainley", and the 19th-century historian Agnes Strickland thought this was a reference to a "William Standen". "Stainley" has also been identified as a "William Stanley", a young son of Rowland Stanley of Hooton not otherwise mentioned in any Scottish record.

== The cradle knight ==
According to a narrative of a talk between Darnley and his father, Standen smuggled his mistress into Edinburgh Castle during Mary's pregnancy, and it was rumoured the woman was also Darnley's mistress.

Standen was knighted by Darnley around this time. He described the circumstances of his knighthood in his "Relation" which he sent as a petition to King James in April 1604;

"after Her Majesty was most happily delivered of the then Lord the Prince ... at which time in acknowledgement of Standen's services, it pleased the King by the Queen's appointment to honour him with the order of knighthood, as also it pleased Her Majesty, some days after the childbirth to cause the knight to be called into her bedchamber, where the infant Prince laid asleep, a cross of diamonds fixed on his breast, upon this cross Her Majesty commanded the knight to lay his hand, to whom it her pleasure herself to give the oath of fidelity."

Standen wrote that Mary, Queen of Scots, declared he was the first Englishman to do homage to the prince, saying, "For that you saved his life". He wrote that Mary said her baby had unclenched his fists, a sign of a generous nature. In another version of Standen's narrative, Darnley organised a tournament of running at the ring to celebrate the royal birth, and Standen won the prize of a jewel.

Lord Herries' Memoirs describes a conversation between Mary, Darnley, and "William Stainley" in which she brought up the risk of her injury by gunshot during the murder of Rizzio. An English envoy Henry Killigrew came to Edinburgh to congratulate Mary on the birth, and refused to speak to Standen.

Another English man, William Rogers, came to Edinburgh in June and went hunting and hawking with Anthony Standen and Darnley. On his return to Oxford, he wrote to William Cecil that he had deliberately befriended the Standens and for a few days was thought to be a new member of Darnley's entourage. He offered to capture the two Standens and another English Catholic, Christopher Rokesby.

== France and Italy ==
Mary sent him to Charles IX of France, with an official payment of £100 Scots, and he received a pension of annuity from the Cardinal of Lorraine. Anthony, the younger Standen brother, was in Edinburgh in February 1567 after the murder of Lord Darnley, and with the other English servants Welson and Gwyn sought a passport. He was imprisoned at Berwick for a year. In 1570 he was said to be involved with Corbeyran de Cardaillac Sarlabous in a plot to invade England.

In 1576 he was banished from Antwerp by Philip II of Spain for over familiarity with Madame de Blomberg, mother of Don John of Austria. From 1582 Standen worked for Mary Queen of Scots in Florence, and in 1587 started working for Francis Walsingham.

On 23 March 1583 he wrote to James Beaton, Archbishop of Glasgow, expressing his wish to return to Scotland and serve James VI until Mary Queen of Scots was freed. He said he had told the Grand Duke of Tuscany of the likely "association" of Mary and James, by which the captive queen would be returned to Scotland. He would like the portrait of the king for the Grand Duke. Standen wondered if the duke's daughter Eleanor de' Medici would be a suitable bride for James. On the same day he wrote to John Lesley, Bishop of Ross, also conjecturing that Eleanor de' Medici, a wise and fair lady, would be a good bride for James VI.

Standen obtained information from the Tuscan ambassador in Spain, Giovanni Figliazzi, in 1587 and 1588 and was able to report to Walsingham on preparations for the Armada, using in his correspondence an alias "Pompeo Pellegrini". The historian Conyers Read discussed the identification of Pellegrini with Standen, some writers suggest that Pellegrini was the younger Standen.

In 1590 Standen was in prison in Bordeaux and was helped by Anthony Bacon who paid his debts, and made his return to England possible. On 25 November 1593 Mary Radcliffe spoke to him at Windsor Castle and told him the queen would give him an audience if he waited at the castle.

Standen reported that Anthony Shirley sailed from Plymouth on 21 May 1596 for Africa with five ships, with the financial support of the Earl of Essex, but had hoped to command a larger fleet and was cheated of his ambition and like others "notably cut-throated and consumed".

Rowland Whyte mentioned that Standen was too old to be a "gallant suitor" to a rich widow Mrs Shelley in February 1598. Standen's suit was favoured by Lord Buckhurst, but the Earl of Essex preferred another candidate, Sir Thomas Smith who he had knighted at Cadiz in 1596.

== Mission to Italy and imprisonment ==
In 1603 Standen was asked to travel and announce the accession of James VI and I to the English throne in Florence and Venice. He arrived in Venice in August with the King's letter for the Doge of Venice, and was given a gold chain worth 500 ducats. Standen gave the Doge Marino Grimani a portrait of King James, and the Doge had a larger version made.

Standen went to Rome to collect altar ornaments and beads intended for Anne of Denmark, a gift which was supposed to open a relationship leading to the conversion of England to the Catholic religion. Standen himself wrote to Robert Persons that "the Queene [is] warned from dealing in Cath: causes, and she ys very assyduous at sermons, so that I am in a stagger what shall become of my tokens", meaning his efforts would not be successful. He hoped the queen would become Catholic, "doubtless and reconciled", perhaps by the means of Anne Howard, Countess of Arundel. Confronted by Robert Cecil with this letter, he was imprisoned in the Tower of London in January 1604. At this time, Standen wrote his relation or narrative of events which includes his account of his service to Mary and Darnley and his visit to Florence and Rome.

The Venetian ambassador Nicolò Molin heard that an English agent had befriended Standen in Paris and taken his letters intended for Rome. Some of the beads and other items intended for Anne of Denmark were given to the Papal nuncio in Paris to be returned, according to a letter of Nicolas de Neufville, seigneur de Villeroy. Cecil wrote to the ambassador in Paris, Thomas Parry, saying he should tell the Papal nuncio that Standen had misled him and Anne of Denmark was not a Catholic, and King James insisted:

if any false informer have presumed, out of their own vanity, to describe the Queen's minde as if she did believe in the Romish religion, he shall take his princely word that he is wronged and she abused; for although when she was in Scotland she mysliked many of those precise opinions which were mayntayned by most of those churches, yet for the matter of her fayth, she was never tyed to the Romish assertions

In February 1604, Sir William Broune heard that Standen was intended to bring Anne of Denmark a message of assurance in her religion, and that she would then try to convert King James. Villeroy and the French ambassador in London, Christophe de Harlay, Count of Beaumont, doubted that Standen had official instructions from King James. They also conjectured that Standen had been sent to Italy to give the impression that James would be sympathetic to Catholics. King James sent Michael Balfour of Burleigh to Italy to investigate Standen's activities. Standen was released from the Tower in August 1604 after Balfour's return, according to the Venetian ambassador Nicolò Molin.

He obtained a licence to travel in July 1605 from the king. In March 1606 he was in Rome and visited the Venetian ambassador Agostino Nani. He explained that he had been imprisoned in England for bringing rosaries and religious objects to Anne of Denmark, and she had interceded for his release. He mentioned that Anne of Denmark enjoyed hearing Nicolò Molin and Zorzi Giustinian, the Venetian ambassadors in London, speaking Italian.

In August 1606 Anne of Denmark sent a letter to Christina of Lorraine Duchess of Tuscany on behalf of her servant Standen who was travelling in Italy for reasons of conscience and religion. He was still in Rome in 1615.
