= Robert de Munro, 8th Baron of Foulis =

Robert de Munro (died 1369) is the first chief of the Scottish Clan Munro who can be proved by contemporary evidence. He is also by tradition the 8th Baron of Foulis and 11th overall chief of the clan.

== Lands and charters ==
Robert Munro had a charter which is still preserved from Uilleam III, Earl of Ross (William) dated between 1333 and 1350 which recorded that the Earl of Ross's father Hugh, Earl of Ross had granted the lands of Findon in the barony of Awach to Robert Munro's father who is unnamed in the document.

Further lands granted to Robert Munro between 1350 and 1371 were exchanged by him for the 'davach' of land 'Estirfowlis' (Easter Foulis) with the 'fortyr' of Strathskehech. This grant is said to have been confirmed by a crown charter dated at Perth on 17 November 1363, however the charter has not survived.

Robert is said to have been killed fighting in defense of the Earl of Ross. The Munro Tree of 1734 states that he was in pursuit of a band of fugitives. A charter from the Earl of Ross to Robert's son Hugh Munro dated 9 August 1369 mentions 'the laudable service of his father lately killed in defense of the said Earl'.

== Family ==
Robert Munro married Jean Ross, daughter of Hugh Ross, 1st of Balnagowen, chief of the Clan Ross and descendant of Hugh, Earl of Ross. Jean Ross's mother Margaret Barclay was the niece of Euphemia de Ross second wife of King Robert II of Scotland. Robert Munro and Jean Ross had three sons:

1. Hugh Munro, 9th Baron of Foulis, heir and successor as chief of the Clan Munro.
2. Thomas Munro, who is said to have killed the governor of Dingwall Castle in a duel. According to the Munro family tree of 1734 Thomas Munro is the ancestor of the Lords Rollo. After the duel Thomas Munro is said to have moved south and married the 'aires' of Duncrube. He was later called 'Roach' and the south accent corrupted it to 'Rogue' or 'Rollock'. Thomas's son John got the lands of Duncrube confirmed to him by David Stewart, Earl of Strathearn on 13 February 1380. His descendant William got it erected into a barony by King James IV of Scotland and his descendant Andrew is said to have been knighted and created a lord in 1651. See Lord Rollo.
3. John Munro, who is said to have been mentioned in a crown charter of 22 July 1426 but this charter has not survived.

According to Alexander Mackenzie, Robert Munro may have married secondly a daughter of Sir Adam Forrester, the chief of Clan Forrester from whom he had a fourth son also called John Munro but of whom nothing is known.
