= James Scrimgeour =

Scottish landowner (d. 1612)

James Scrimgeour (died 1612) Scottish landowner and Constable of Dundee.

He was the son of John Scrymgeour and Margaret Campbell. In his father's lifetime he was known as feuar of Dudhope. He became Constable and Provost of Dundee.

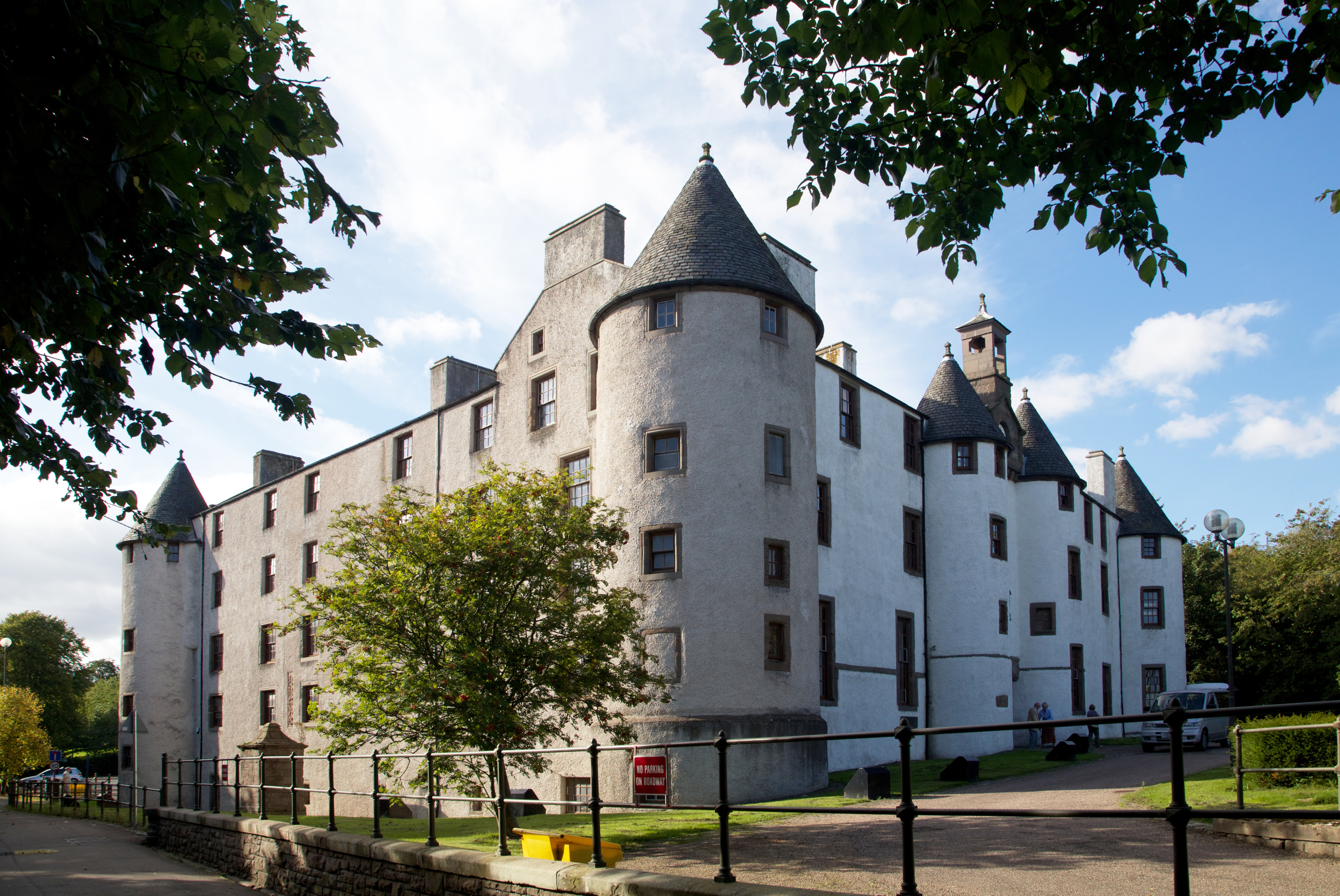
Dudhope Castle

== Career ==
Scrimgeour was patron of an altar in Dundee Parish Kirk dedicated to Saint Margaret of Scotland, and even after the Scottish Reformation was able to present candidates to this church position, in January 1580 he wrote to John Erskine of Dun recommending Robert Gray, a son of the laird of Ballegerno, who would be able to use the income to fund his studies at school and university.

According to David Hume of Godscroft, Scrimgeour escorted the Earl of Angus, an exile from court, northwards in 1583. He pretended the Earl was his son-in-law, the "Laird of Inshmartin". Scrimgeour was a supporter of the Earl of Angus in April 1584 and was one of those commanded to surrender Stirling Castle and Mar's Wark.

On 8 October 1588 James VI wrote to him from Falkland to return Broughty Castle to the keeping of its owner Patrick Gray, 5th Lord Gray.

Scrimgeour was sent with the ambassador George Keith, 5th Earl Marischal to Denmark in June 1589 as a commissioner to negotiate the marriage of James VI to Anne of Denmark. His companions were Andrew Keith, Lord Dingwall, John Skene, William Fowler, and George Young. In November the Scottish party divided into two factions, supporters of the Earl Marischal and supporters of the Chancellor, John Maitland of Thirlestane. Scrimgeour and Lord Dingwall sided with Marischal. The argument was over precedence and custody of the dowry money. According to James Melville of Halhill the king sided with Maitland and came to regret sending Marischal, Scrimgeour, and Dingwall.

Scrimgeour signed the ratification of the king's marriage contract at Oslo on 21 November 1589. The other witnesses were John Maitland, the Earl Marischal, the Provost of Lincluden, Patrick Vans of Barnbarroch, Lewis Bellenden, Alexander Lindsay, John Carmichael, William Keith of Delny, William Stewart, John Skene, and George Young.

Scrimgeour's role in the royal proxy marriage was celebrated in a Latin poem by the Edinburgh schoolmaster Hercules Rollock, which describes him swallowing a huge gulp of red wine while toasting Christian IV, and also alludes to his exile in Denmark in the 1580s during the ascendency of James Stewart, Earl of Arran. In April 1585, a rumour had reached England that Scrimgeour had been poisoned at a banquet in Denmark.

His wife Magdalen Livingstone was appointed to welcome Anne of Denmark at Leith, with Isobel Hamilton, Lady Seton and Margaret Montgomerie, Lady Seton, Mary Beaton, Lady Boyne, and the Lady Chancellor. Scrimgeour was knighted at the queen's coronation.

Scrimgeour had a lawsuit against the Laird of Lawis involving a "brieve of idiotry" and the Graham family.

In January 1591 he owed an Edinburgh tailor, William Hoppringle, £1,400 Scots. The money may have been for clothes, or a sum lent to Scrimgeour. Hoppringle transferred the debt to Andrew Kinnaird, a burgess of Dundee, thinking to get quicker payment, but Kinnaird did not oblige.

Scrimgeour was given a role at the baptism of Prince Henry at Stirling Castle in August 1594. He was one of four gentlemen appointed to hold the canopy or "paill" over Prince Henry. The canopy was carried from the palace and held over the prince in the Chapel Royal.

On 25 May 1598 he came to the banquet for the queen's brother the Duke of Holstein at Holyrood Palace and brought gifts of moor fowls, capercaillies, black cocks, kids, roe deer, and dotterels.

On 15 December 1612 Scrimgeour wrote to the Privy Council to apologise for not attending to discuss a riot in Dundee caused by the Laird of Ruthven. He sent a note from his doctor describing his "hemoroids" which prevented him from riding his horse.

He died in December 1612 at Holyrood Palace in the lodging of Christian Lindsay, poet and baker, and wife of William Murray, Master of the carriage.

== Marriages and children ==
He married firstly, in 1565, Margaret Carnegie, youngest daughter of Robert Carnegie of Kinnaird and Margaret Guthrie. Their children included:

- Elizabeth Scrimgeour, who married (1) John Campbell, (2) John Ogilvy of Powrie
- Margaret Scrimgeour, who married James Haliburton of Pitcur
- John Scrimgeour, who married Margaret Seton, a daughter of David Seton of Parbroath
- Catherine Scrimgeour, who married, (1) William Ochterlony of that Ilk, (2) Dugald Campbell of Auchinbreck

He married secondly Magdalen Livingstone, daughter of Alexander Livingston, 5th Lord Livingston and Agnes Douglas. She had been a lady in waiting to Mary, Queen of Scots and had previously been married to Arthur Erskine of Blackgrange.
