= John Stewart of Traquair =

John Stewart of Traquair (died 1591) was a Scottish landowner and soldier.

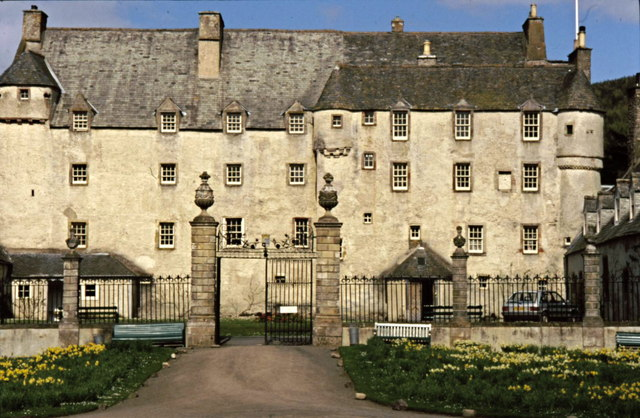
Traquair House

== Career ==
He was a son of William Stewart of Traquair and Christian Hay. He was a younger brother of Robert Stewart of Traquair, from whom he inherited the family estates.

His home was Traquair House at Innerleithen. Stewart was a Protestant and supported the Scottish Reformation.

A young laird of Traquair, possibly Robert Stewart, was shot at the siege of Haddington in August 1548. In November 1553, Mary of Guise summoned the Earl of Bothwell to her presence, and instead, he sent his excuses with "my cousin of Trakwair" (presumably John Stewart).

In December 1562 Mary, Queen of Scots sent Adam MacCulloch, Marchmont Herald, to Hermitage Castle, demanding its surrender to John Stewart of Traquair. He received cereal from the Thirds of Benefices to contribute to the castle provisions.

Stewart was a captain of the Royal Guard of Mary, Queen of Scots and Lord Darnley. He is said to have accompanied them on their ride to Seton Palace and Dunbar Castle with Arthur Erskine of Blackgrange and Anthony Standen after the murder of David Rizzio. Standen wrote in one version of his narrative that Traquair's brother, William Stewart, was also present.

The "Book of Articles" written against Mary mentions that the "laird of Traquair" attended Mary's bedchamber at Holyrood Palace before the murder of Lord Darnley. According to John Lesley in The Defence, the laird of Traquair was one of the gentlemen who attended Darnley's funeral at Holyrood Abbey.

He was engaged in a feud with his kinsman William Hay, 6th Lord Hay of Yester in 1587, and Hay was imprisoned in Edinburgh Castle.

John Stewart married Jonet Ker. They had children.

John Stewart died on 18 April 1591.

In 1591 William Stewart of Caverston, his younger brother, inherited the Traquair lands, and after his death Traquair went to another brother, James Stewart, who was married to Kathrine Ker (died 1606). His son, John Stewart, married Margaret Stewart, a daughter of Margaret Stewart, Mistress of Ochiltree. Their son was John Stewart, 1st Earl of Traquair.
