= Arthur Erskine of Blackgrange =

Scottish courtier

Arthur Erskine of Blackgrange (died 1571) was a Scottish courtier.

== Career ==
He was a son of John Erskine, 5th Lord Erskine and Margaret Campbell. Erskine became an equerry or master of the stable to Mary, Queen of Scots, first serving her as a cup bearer or éschanson in France. John Knox noted that he accompanied her during her formal Entry to Edinburgh in September 1561. Knox says the queen was given a Bible during the pageant, and quickly passed it to Erskine, who was a Catholic.

In 1562 he married Magdalen Livingstone, a lady in waiting to Queen Mary, and daughter of Alexander Livingston, 5th Lord Livingston and Agnes Douglas. Mary bought him a horse for £40 in April 1562. In December 1566 she gave him £60 Scots, from her income known as the "Thirds of Benefices".

=== The escape from Holyrood Palace ===
Erskine was a guest at Mary's supper at Holyrood Palace on 9 March 1566 when David Rizzio was murdered. He offered to "make some defence" against the intruders. When Mary escaped from the palace the next day at midnight, she rode behind Arthur Erskine to Seton Palace and then to safety at Dunbar Castle. The description of the murder of Rizzio made by the Earl of Bedford and Thomas Randolph says that Lord Robert Stewart and Arthur Erskine tried to resist the murderers when they entered the queen's chamber.

A French report mentions the king and queen rode to Dunbar behind the escuier. Anthony Standen, who served as Darnley's equerry, wrote that Mary was mounted behind Erskine, Darnley was on another horse, and there were six in the party riding to Dunbar, including John Stewart of Traquair, captain of the royal guard, and a chamberer or servant for Mary.

== Later career ==
Arthur Erskine and Magdalen Livingstone stayed at Dryburgh on the 9 and 10 of October 1566 with his kinsman David Erskine, Commendator of Dryburgh before riding to Jedburgh to join Mary, Queen of Scots. Mary then rode from Jedburgh to Hermitage Castle to see the Earl of Bothwell.

As one of the masters of the queen's stable, Erskine kept an account with Robert Abercromby, an Edinburgh craftsman who made saddles and reins.

He died in 1571.

After his death, Magdalen Livingstone married James Scrimgeour of Dudhope in 1577. Mary, Queen of Scots, was displeased by the news of this marriage.
