= Alexander Forrester of Garden =

Alexander Forrester of Garden (fl. 1550–1599) was a Scottish landowner. He was the son of David Forrester of Torwood and Garden and Elizabeth Sandilands, daughter of James Sandilands of Slamannan.

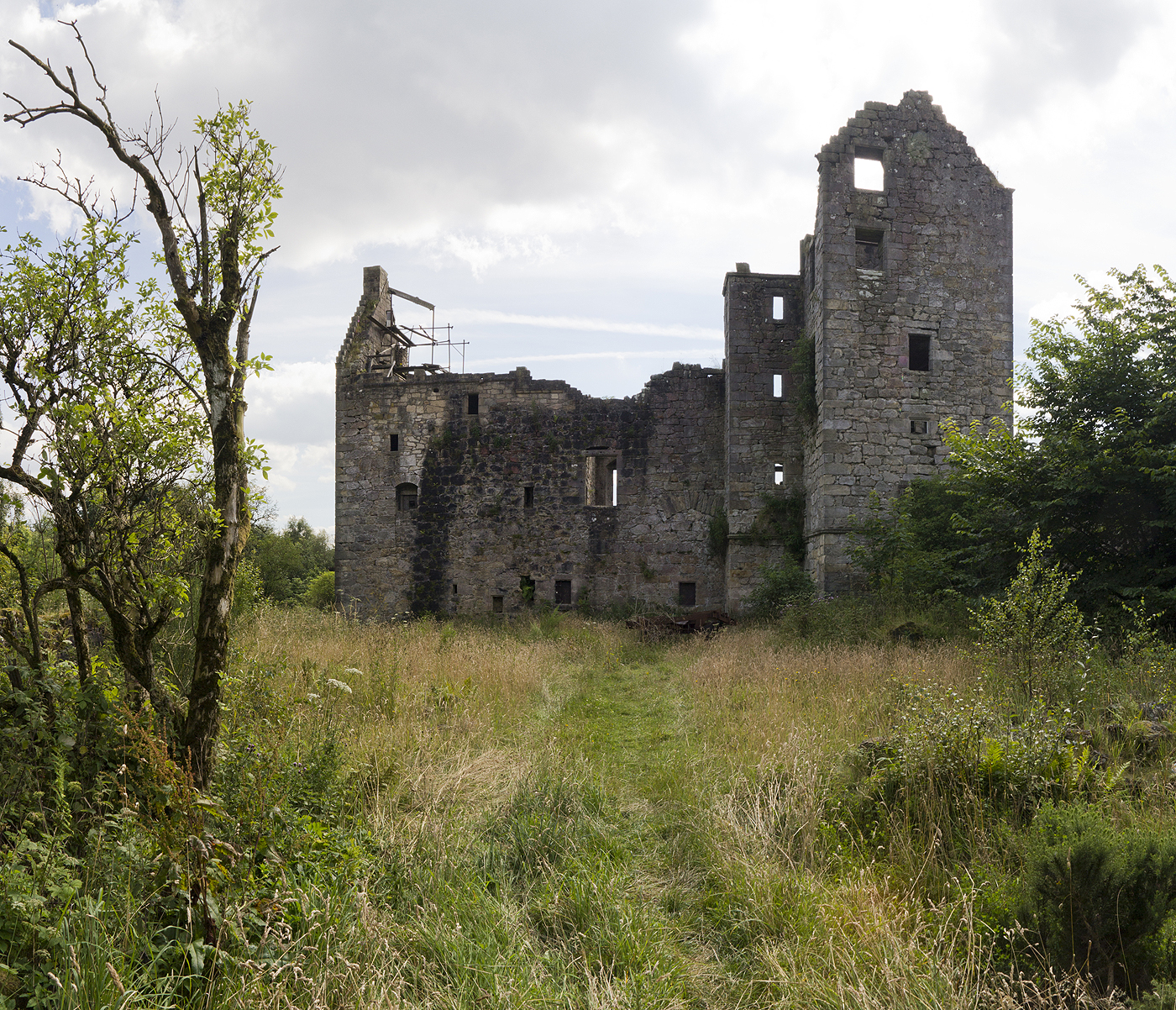
Forrester rebuilt Torwood Castle

The name may be spelled "Forester" or "Forster". They were keepers of the royal Torwood Forest. In 1541 the Laird of Torwoodhead built a stable for the mares of James V of Scotland in the royal forest. Their home was Torwood Castle, where a datestone of "1566" suggests that Alexander Forrester built the remaining structure. "Garden" is near Arnprior, several miles to the west of Torwood.

Robert Beaton of Creich and "Alexander Forster, laird of Torwood" were both in Paris in October 1560 and carried letters from the English ambassador Nicholas Throckmorton to William Cecil in London.

Alexander Forrester was Provost of Stirling in 1562 and 1565 and had a house in Stirling.

On 21 March 1567 he witnessed and signed an inventory of guns and artillery equipment at Edinburgh Castle. The occasion of making the inventory was that the Earl of Mar resigned responsibility for the castle to Sir James Balfour of Pittendreich. In a formal ceremony, Forrester, with John Cunningham of Drumquhassil, Alexander Erskine of Gogar, David Erskine, Commendator of Dryburgh, and Archibald Haldane, Constable of Edinburgh Castle, gave the castle keys to James Cockburn of Skraling.

In 1593 he was involved in a boundary dispute at Torwood forest with John Drummond of Slipperfield, father of the poet William Drummond of Hawthornden, and the Comptroller, David Seton of Parbroath. The Torwood belonged the lands of the Chapel Royal and had a boundary with "Forrester's Mansion", or Torwood Castle. Forrester of Garden assembled a company of armed men to intimidate commissioners intending to walk the boundary.

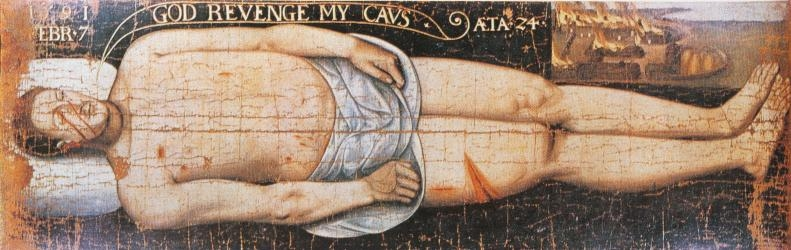
Banner for the murdered Earl of Moray

In June 1594, a kinsman, David Forrester of Logie, a Baillie of Stirling, was ambushed near Linlithgow during a feud amongst local families. His cause was taken up the powerful Earl of Mar who organised a funeral procession through the lands of the Livingstone and Bruce families, with a painted banner of the victim's body carried between two spears. Forrester was involved in various bands intended to keep the peace. A similar painted banner was produced for the funeral of James Stewart, 2nd Earl of Moray in 1592 and survives at Darnaway Castle.

John Colville and the English diplomats Robert Bowes and George Nicholson mentioned the aftermath of the murder in several letters. In December 1595 James VI had a proclamation made at the town cross of Stirling denouncing Forrester and his sons and followers. They attacked the Officer of Arms and tore his letters in contempt for this legal process. Forrester's sons were banished from the county for three years or longer.

== Marriage and children ==
He married Jean Erskine, a daughter of John Erskine of Dun. Their children included:

- James Forrester of Garden, who married Margaret Fleming, daughter of the Earl of Wigton and Lilias Graham. He was knighted at the baptism of Prince Henry at Stirling Castle in 1594.
- John Forrester of Denovan
- Barbara Forrester, who married David Livingstone of Dunipace
