= Torwood Castle =

Ruined castle in Falkirk, Scotland

Coordinates: 56.0380°N 3.8700°W

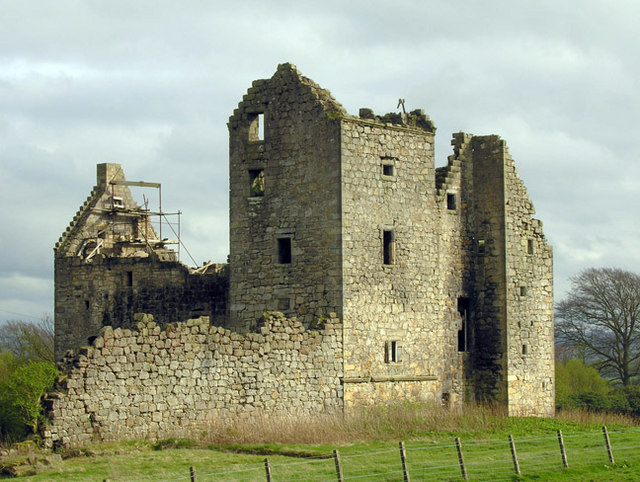
Torwood Castle in April 2007

Torwood Castle is a ruined 16th-century L-plan castle near the village of Torwood, in the Falkirk Council area of central Scotland. It was designated as a Category A listed building in 1979. The Buildings at Risk Register for Scotland originally listed its level of risk as low, but raised that level to moderate in mid-2019 after seeing signs of continued neglect.

== History ==
The estate was held originally by the Foresters of Garden, who were the foresters responsible for the nearby Royal Forest of Tor Wood from the second half of the 15th century until the mid-17th century. Based on the date found on a carved stone panel found not far from the castle in 1918, the castle has been estimated as being built around 1566 for Sir Alexander Forrester. It passed to Clan Baillie in the early 16th century and then to George, 1st Lord Forrester in 1635.

Regent Morton came to Torwood in September 1575. The castle was captured prefatory to taking Stirling Castle during the 1585 successful rebellion of the Earls of Mar and Angus.

The castle was purchased by Gordon Millar in 1957, who began to restore it, but he was only able to stabilise the stonework. He set up the Torwood Castle Charitable Trust before his death in 1998, in order to continue the work. The Trust did all they could to protect the castle under the Will and Constitutional Document left to protect the castle, which had been agreed by the law lords of Scotland at Edinburgh's High Court of Justiciary.

Owing to both retirement and death of trustees only one ex-officio trustee was left to secure the castle's future: Mr Andrew Bryce.

In 2017 local councillor Niall Coleman asked Mr Andrew Bryce (in his capacity as a former trustee) to again become a standard trustee to save the castle, in lines with the constitutional document but Mr Bryce at this time declined in order to look after his wife.

In September 2018, Mr Gary Grant, a local man from Denny, moved into the castle, in order to protect it from vandalism, as it was not secured.

Mr Grant was unaware of the trust's position and thought the trust had creased. Not known what else to do or who to contact to secure the Castle's future in any other way. Stayed there and continued with maintaining the castle as best as he could in honour of this friend Gordon Miller that helped as a child to put some of the castle back together.

The trust are now in the process of securing the Castle's future in lines with the constitutional document, to go alongside trusteeships and seeking a new secretary position and assistance from all professionals that can help Torwood Castle survive as the only castle left in Falkirk district council area.

== Description ==
The roofless castle is three storeys tall and comprises a vaulted ground floor, a first floor and an attic. The short wing housed the staircase and has gables at its north and south ends. It had a cobbled courtyard enclosed by three ranges of buildings, although little remains of them. Two rooms of the north range were excavated in 1999, revealing a kitchen and a well room.
