= Barbara Blomberg =

German singer and mistress of Charles V (1527–1597)

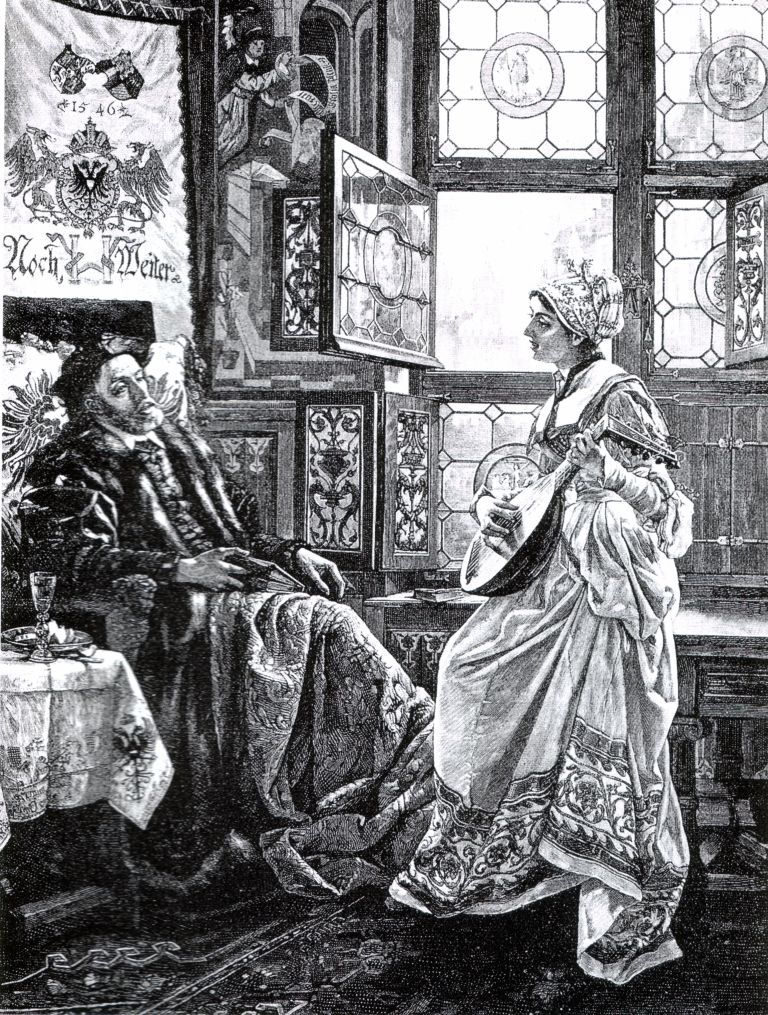
- Charles V and Barbara Blomberg
- Born: 1527; Ratisbon, Holy Roman Empire
- Died: 18 December 1597 (aged 70); Ambrosero, Spain
- Burial place: Church of San Sebastian, Montehano
- Spouse: Hieronymus Kegel
- Children: John of Austria; Three children by Hieronymus Kegel
- Parent(s): Wolfgang Plumberger/Blomberg; Sibilla Lohman

Barbara Blomberg (1527 – 18 December 1597) was the mother of Don John of Austria.

Blomberg was born in Ratisbon (modern Germany), the eldest daughter of Wolfgang Plumberger or Blomberg, a burgher, and of his wife Sibilla Lohman. A singer, in 1546 she was for a short time the mistress of the Holy Roman Emperor Charles V, who was in Regensburg for the meeting of the Imperial Diet. On 24 February 1547 Blomberg gave birth to John of Austria, who was almost immediately taken from her and sent to be raised in Spain.

Shortly afterwards Blomberg married Hieronymus Kegel, an imperial official. In 1551 she moved to Brussels with her husband where Kegel was responsible for the equipment of the imperial mercenary army. They had three children.

When Kegel died in 1569, Blomberg and her children were in reduced financial circumstances. At the request of the governor of the Netherlands, the Duke of Alba, she was granted a pension by King Philip II of Spain (her oldest son's agnate half-brother).

In November 1576 Blomberg met her son John of Austria for the only time since his birth. Subsequently, she went into a Dominican convent in Castile, 70 km south of Valladolid. After John of Austria died in 1578, Philip II allowed her to choose her own residence. She established herself first in the village of Colindres. In 1584 she purchased an estate in the village of Ambrosero in Cantabria.

Blomberg died at the age of seventy at her estate in Ambrosero. She is buried in the Church of San Sebastian at the monastery of Montehano (also known as Convento San Sebastián de Hano), between Ambrosero and Santoña.

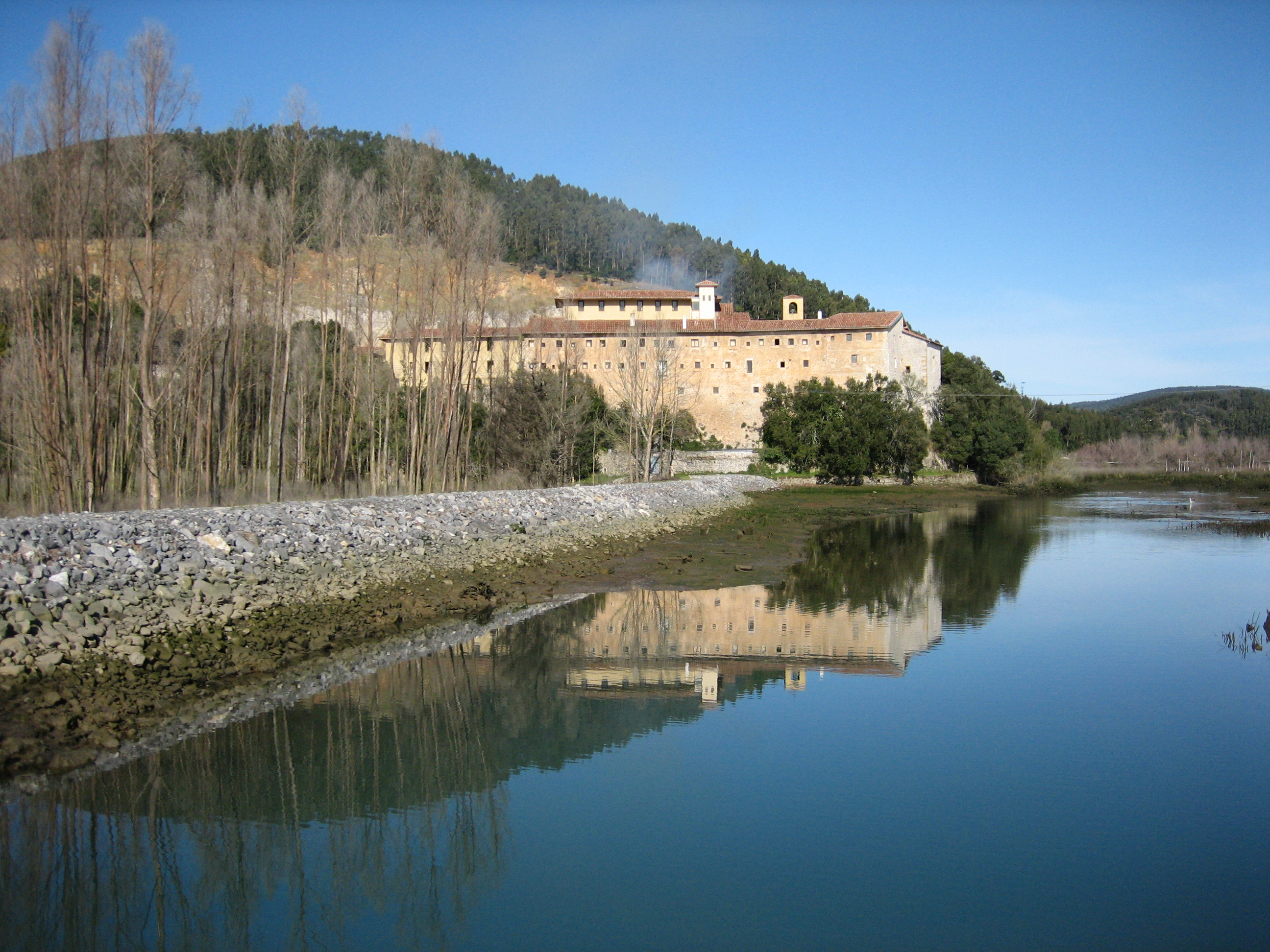
Convento de Montehano +43° 25' 46.79", -3° 29' 23.65"

== In literature ==
Blomberg has been the subject of a number of novels and plays:

- In 1837, Patricio de la Escosura y Morrogh wrote the Spanish-language play Barbara Blomberg: drama en cuatro actos en verso.
- In 1897, Georg Ebers wrote the German-language novel Barbara Blomberg: ein historischer Roman.
- In 1934, Alice Goldberger Liebling wrote the English-language play An Emperor's Great Love (Barbara Blomberg).
- In 1949, Carl Zuckmayer wrote the German-language play Barbara Blomberg: ein Stück in drei Akten.
- In 1953, Heinz Schauwecker wrote the German-language novella Die Sternenstunde der Barbara Blomberg: Novelle um die Geburt des Don Juan d'Austria.
- In 1999, Teresa Alvarez wrote the Spanish-language novel La pasión última de Carlos V.

== Bibliography ==
- Panzer, Marita A. Barbara Blomberg, 1527-1597: Bürgerstochter und Kaisergeliebte. Regensburg: F. Pustet, 1995. ISBN 3-7917-1477-5.
- Böckl, Manfred. Die Geliebte des Kaisers: Kaiser Karl V. und Barbara Blomberg. Augsburg: Weltbild, 2004.
- Herre, Paul. Barbara Blomberg, die Geliebte Kaiser Karls V. und Mutter Don Juans de Austria: ein Kurtbild des 16. Jahrhunderts. Leipzig: Quelle & Meyer, 1909.
