= Christian Lindsay =

Scottish poet and baker to the king

Christian Lindsay (fl. 1580–1620) was a Scottish poet and baker to King James VI.

== Career ==
In 1586 Christian Lindsay was married to William Murray, who served as Master of the carriage to James VI of Scotland. In early modern Scotland married women did not change their surnames. Murray's responsibility was the transport of the king and queen's luggage and furnishings by cart as they moved from palace to palace.

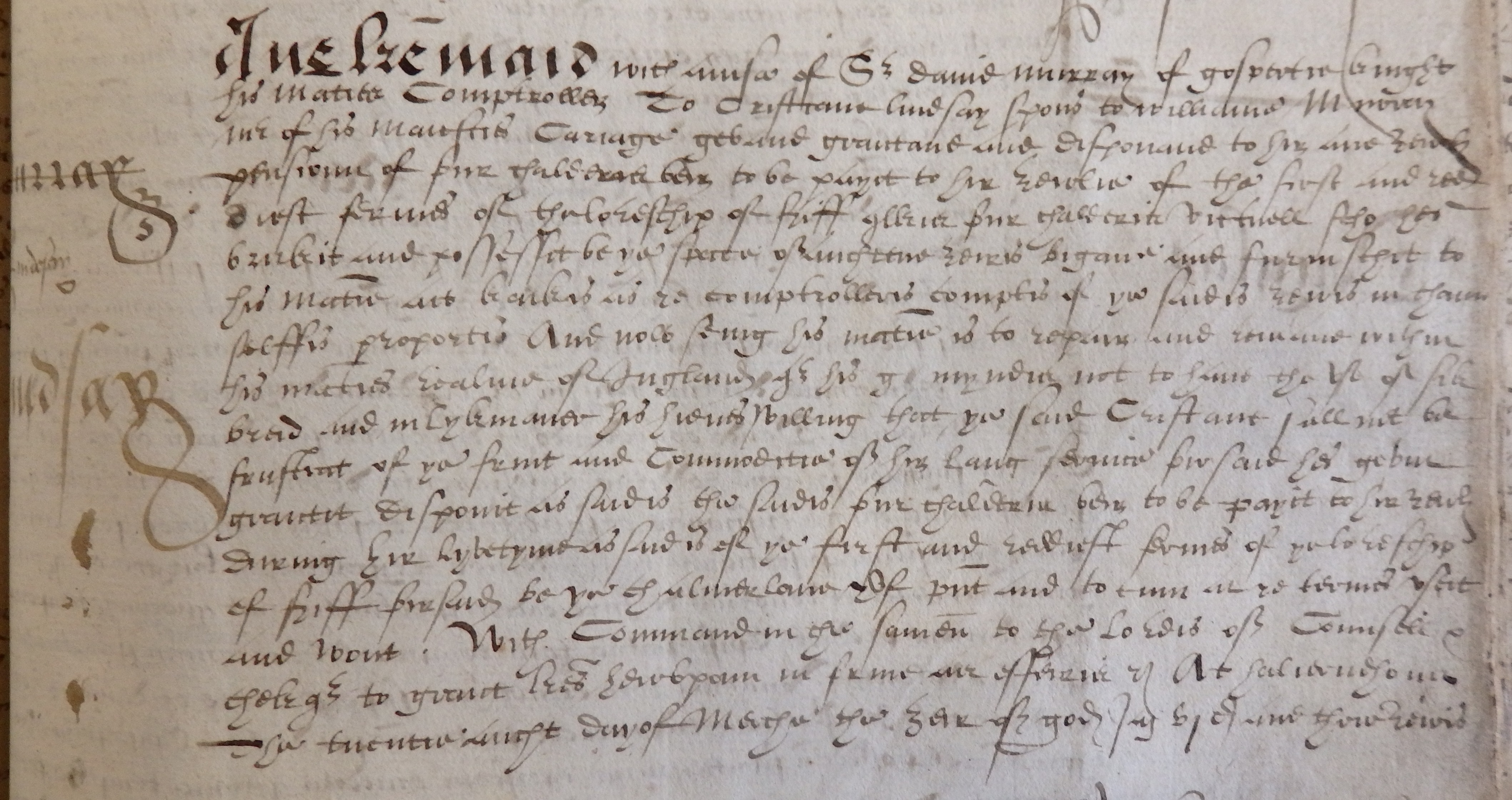
Privy Seal Register entry for Christian Lindsay (NRS PS1/74 f.441)

From 1588 Lindsay was given barley to make baked goods for the royal household. She was supplied with oats to make "caikis" in 1597. On 28 March 1603 James VI confirmed Christian Lindsay's pension paid in "beir", and noted that as he was moving to London he would no longer require the "use of such bread".

She had a lodging at Holyrood Palace. The courtier and Constable of Dundee, James Scrimgeour died in Lindsay's lodging in 1612.

== Sonnet ==
A sonnet titled "Christeane Lyndesay to Robert Hudsone" is included in Alexander Montgomerie's poems. It may be Lindsay's work or possibly Montgomerie wrote the sonnet in her voice. It is also uncertain if the Christian Lindsay mentioned in connection with this and in other poems was the same person as the wife of William Murray.

Robert, or "Robene", Hudson, to whom the sonnet is addressed, was an English poet and musician at court, a brother of Thomas Hudson.

Montgomerie wrote to Hudson:

Quhen we are deid, that all our days bot daffis
Let Christian Lyndesay wryte our epitaphis

A "daff" is a game.
