= Torwood =

Coordinates: 56.042°N 3.862°W

Torwood: Scottish Gaelic: Coille Tor
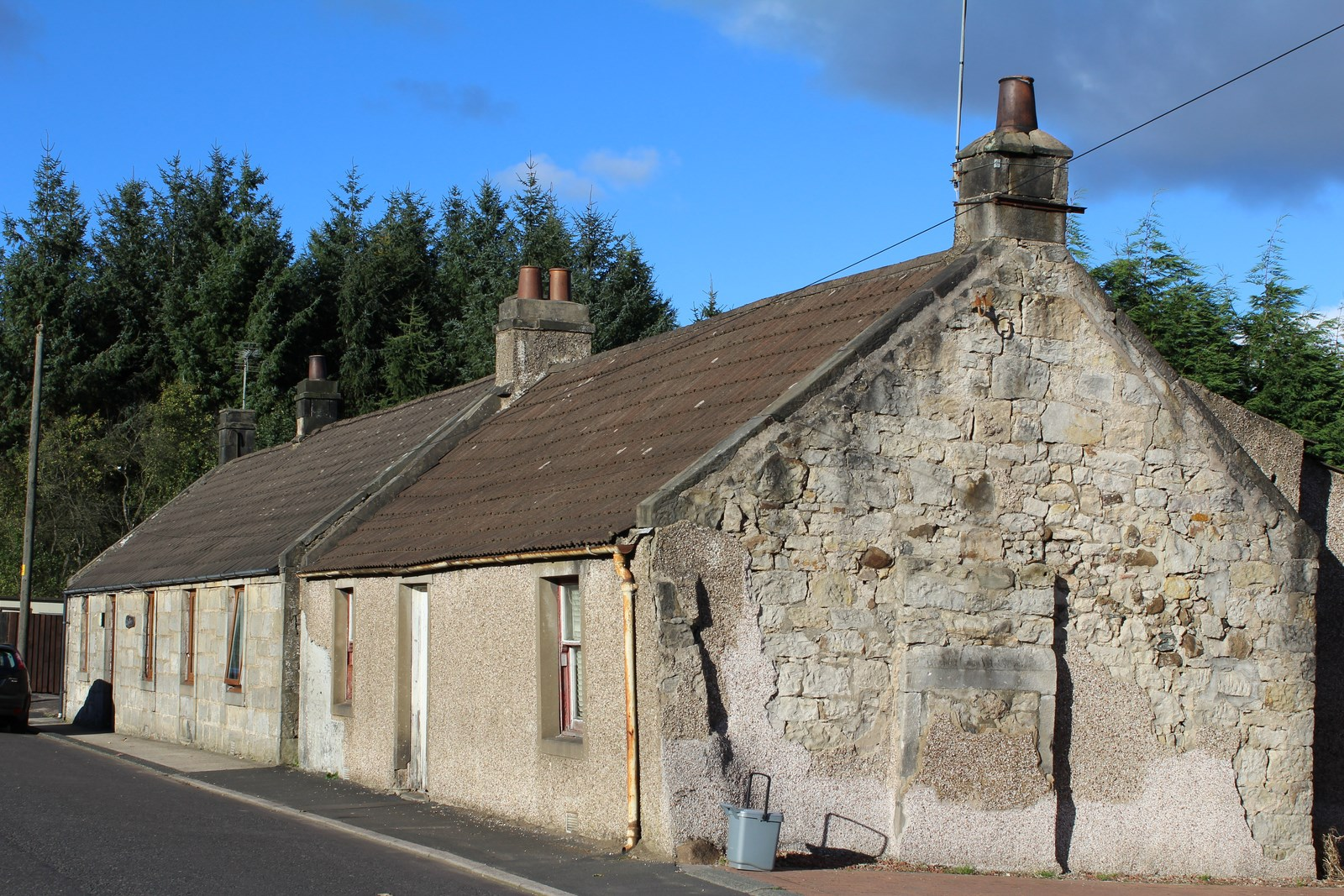
- Cottages at the south of Torwood

- Location within the Falkirk council area
- Population: 245 (2011)
- OS grid reference: NS 840849
  - Edinburgh: 26.8 mi (43.1 km) ESE
  - London: 349 mi (562 km) SSE
- Civil parish: Dunipace
- Council area: Falkirk
- Lieutenancy area: Stirling and Falkirk
- Country: Scotland
- Sovereign state: United Kingdom
- Post town: LARBERT
- Postcode district: FK5
- Dialling code: 01324
- Police: Scotland
- Fire: Scottish
- Ambulance: Scottish
- UK Parliament: Falkirk
- Scottish Parliament: Falkirk West

Torwood (Scottish Gaelic: Coille Tor) is a small village located 2 miles (3.2 km) north-northwest of Larbert, 4 miles (6.4 km) north-west of Falkirk and 6 miles (9.7 km) south-southeast of Stirling. Torwood lies within the Falkirk Council area of Scotland. The population recorded in the 2011 UK Census was 245.

The A9 road between Bannockburn and Camelon runs through the village. Torwood has 5 streets: Provost Gardens, Stirling Road, Castle Crescent, Forrester Gait & Glen Road. Glen Road leads on to Torwood Castle, Quarry and Broch.

== History ==
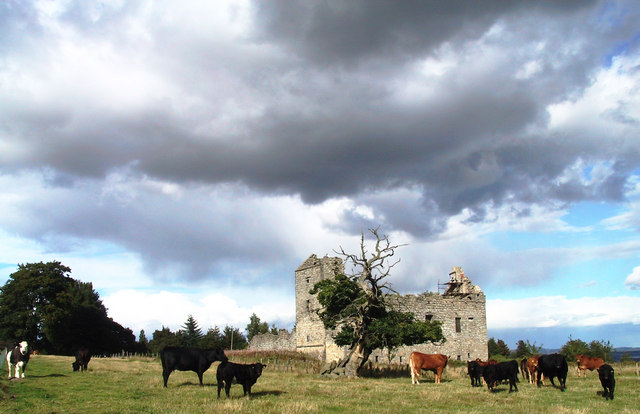
Torwood Castle

The Forresters used to own the lands of Torwood and Torwood Castle but now a private trust owns the castle. Forrester Gait was named after the family.

The Torwood was a large forested area in the 12th century stretching from the River Carron west and north towards Stirling, and inland towards the Campsie Hills. It was traversed by an old Roman Road at this time. In preparation for the Battle of Bannockburn, it was used as the encampment for the men of Sir James Douglas, one of the leaders of the army of King Robert the Bruce.
