= Wardrobe of Anne of Denmark =

Clothing of Anne of Denmark

Much is known of the wardrobe of Anne of Denmark (1574–1619), queen consort of James VI and I, from her portraits, surviving financial records, and a detailed inventory now held by Cambridge University Library. Her style included skirts supported by large farthingales decorated with elaborate embroidery, and the jewellery worn on her costume and hair. Anne's appearance was an essential component of magnificence at the Stuart court and was frequently described in the letters of foreign diplomats.

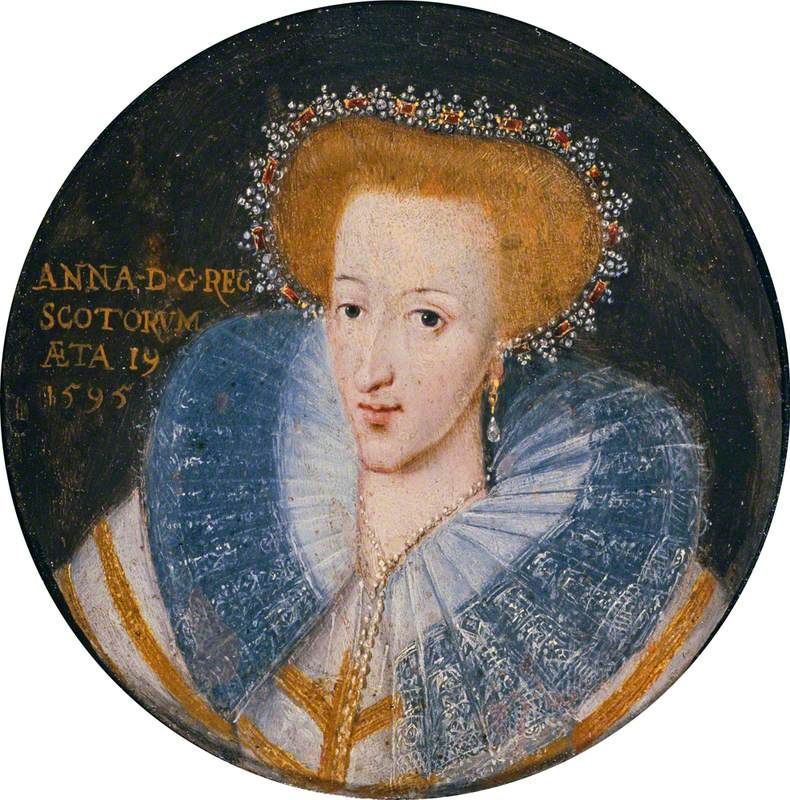
Anne of Denmark, 1595, circle of Adrian Vanson, SNPG

== Scotland ==
Anne of Denmark came to Scotland as the bride of King James VI in 1590, bringing a large trousseau of newly made clothes, with other supplies and personnel, "all so costly, it is strange to hear". She brought a Danish wardrobe master Søren Johnson, a tailor Paul Rey, and a furrier Henry Koss. Four Scottish tailors, Peter Sanderson, William or Walter Simpson, Adam Dewar, and Peter Rannald joined her service.

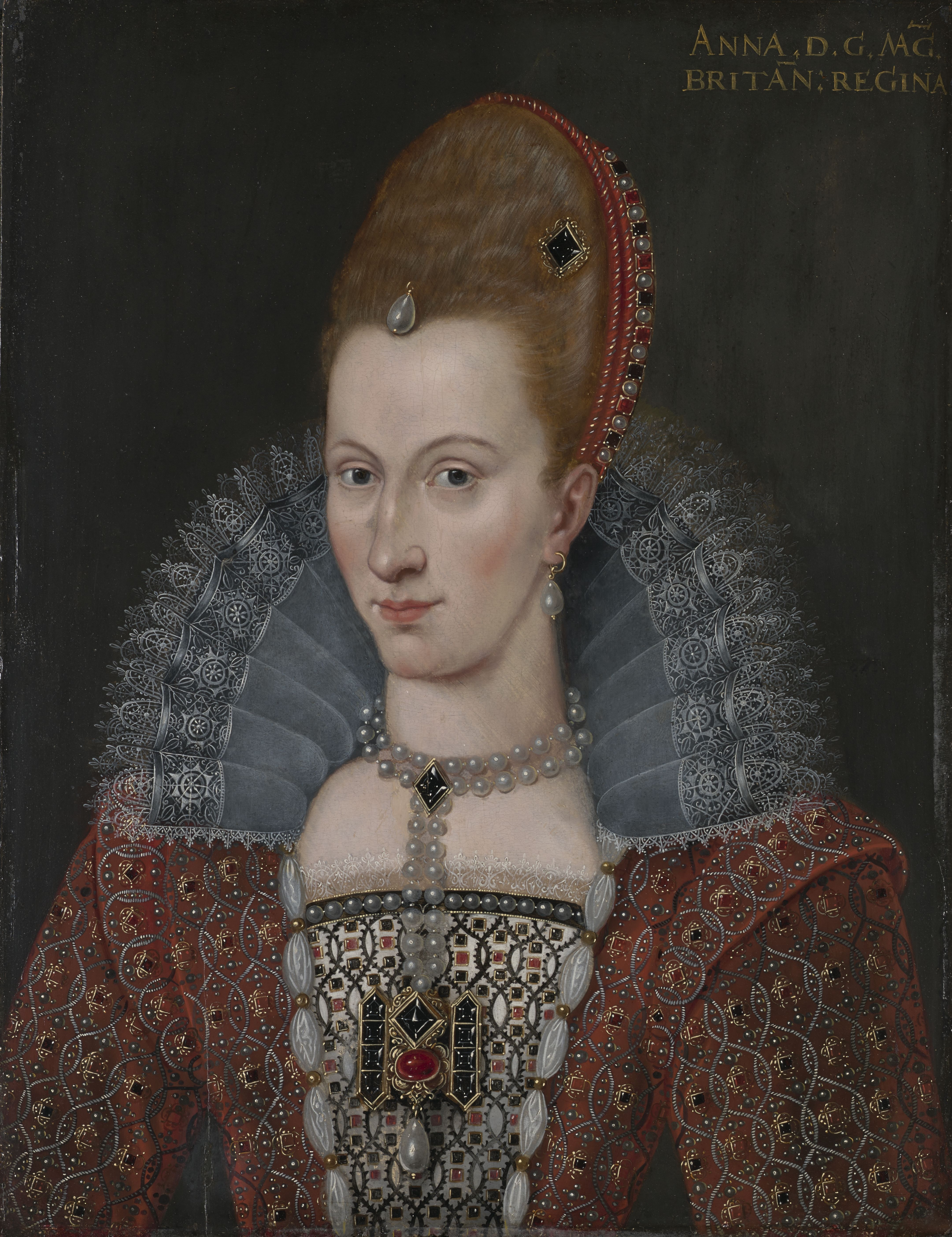
Anne of Denmark painted in 1603 or 1604, with a high coiffure, and a jewel possibly including the Great H of Scotland, GAC.

Anne of Denmark was crowned at St Giles on 17 May 1590, dressed in robes of purple velvet and silk taffeta. Anne's personal seamstress or "Mistress Sewster" was Grissell Hamilton. Some of her clothes in Scotland were made by a courtier, Elizabeth Gibb, wife of the diplomat Peter Young. She made linen items and hats and head coverings and veils for the queen, mufflers and scarfs (some known as "taffetas"), and black satin veils for riding wear. This was paralleled in the English court, where some of Queen Elizabeth's hoods and cauls were made by her gentlewomen Dorothy Abington, Bridget Chaworth, and Margaret Radcliffe. Anne's head dresses included "sneuds", hairnets constructed of silk ribbons by her tailors, while jewelled "attires" were supplied by George Heriot. In the 1590s, Anne sometimes wore her hair in a wide-set coiffure, rather than piled high in the beehive style seen in later portraits.

Fabrics were purchased for her wardrobe by a merchant Robert Jousie and his business partner Thomas Foulis, using some of the money James VI received as a subsidy from Elizabeth I and the custom duty of the Scottish gold mines. Their two surviving accounts for the wardrobe (National Records of Scotland E35/13 and E35/14) detail fabrics bought for garments in journal form in the 1590s. These accounts also mention silk thread bought for the Queen to "weave", further detail of this textile craft was not recorded.

The Danish tailor Paul Rey made her a cloak and a safeguard for riding, and in October 1590, a Danish-style gown, "ane goun of the Dence fassoune". The accounts mention a gown of "fine cloth of silver grounded with brown silk to be her majesty a gown for the time of baptism", worn in August 1594 at Stirling Castle when her formal role included receiving diplomatic gifts at the baptism of her son Henry. A present of a gold chain representing with precious stones the roses of York and Lancaster was said to be suitable for the foreface of the French-style gowns she now wore. She may have worn a ruff bought in London at the baptism.

Clothes were also made for members of Anne's household, like Margaret Vinstarr, Anne Murray, Jean Stewart, the Lutheran minister Johannes Sering, and William Belo, usually with less embroidery and passementerie decoration. In December 1590, the tailor Nycoll Spence made matching gowns of red velvet with blue satin for the sleeves and bodices for two Danish gentlewomen, "Sophier and Kathelene" (Sophia Kaas and Kathrine Skinkell). In March 1591, Paul Rey made them gowns of fine black Naples taffeta. The servant women of her chamber and her laudresses were dressed in rush brown London cloth in winter and "rush brown stemming" in summer. Russet clothes were also noted as a marker of class in England.

On 13 June 1592, Anne ordered coordinating orange and green summer clothes for herself, Vinstarr, Marie Stewart (a "tender bairn"), and for Belo (who was probably a page). She and King James gave clothes as gifts to her servants and gentlewomen for their weddings, including Marie Stewart who married the much older Earl of Mar in December 1592. Costume given by Anne to Jean Stewart, Lady Bargany (died 1605) may appear in her will, which details her gowns with "doublets, skirts, and vaskins", her cloaks, and her jewellery. She owned an expensive veil set with pearls, a "pearl schadow", valued at £66 Scots. George Heriot supplied the queen with masks or veils called countenances and shadows.

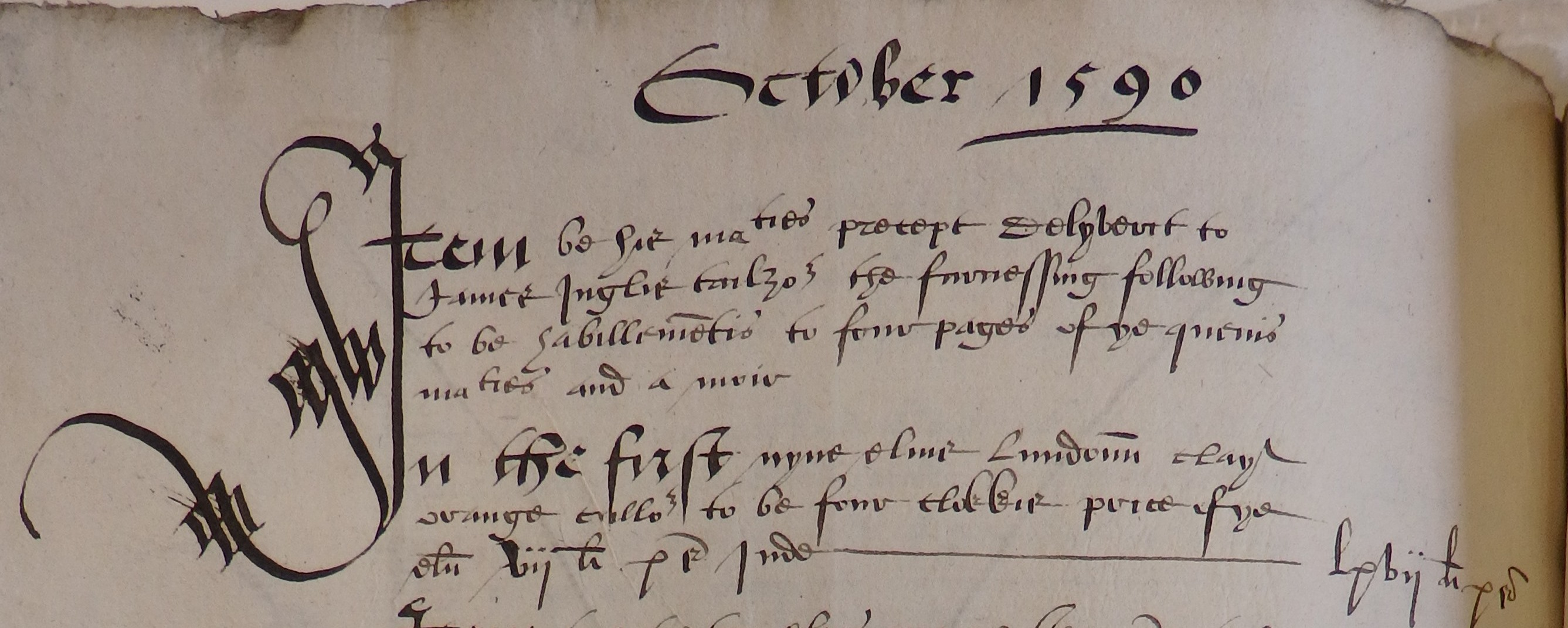
Entry in the Scottish treasurer's accounts for clothes for the queen's pages and the "Moir", National Records of Scotland.

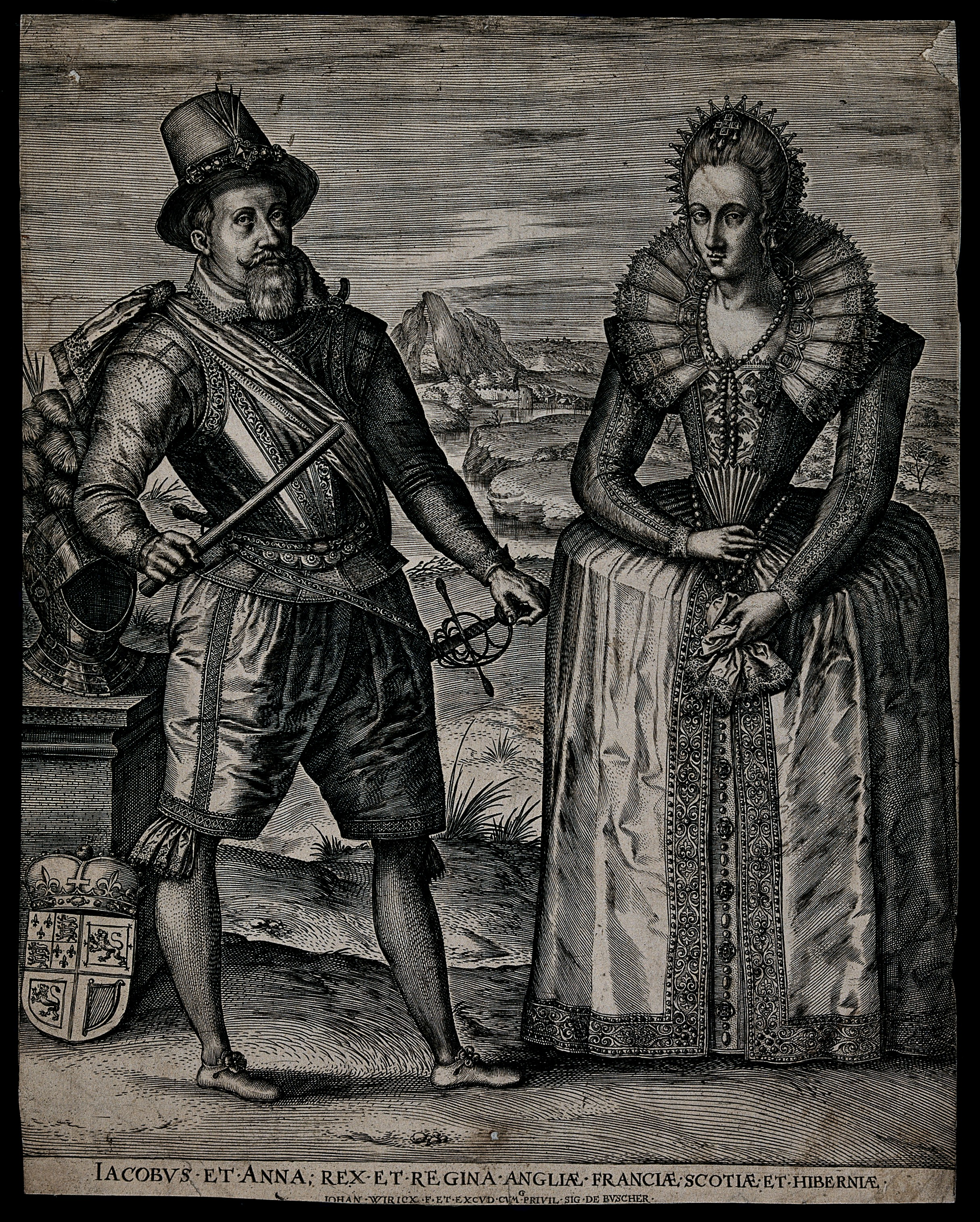
James VI and I and Anne of Denmark, engraving by Johannes Wierix, Wellcome Collection

Some of the costs of clothes for Anne of Denmark and her household were met by the treasurer of Scotland. The treasurer's accounts for October 1590 include a payment for costumes made by James Inglis and Alexander Miller for four pages and an African servant recorded as the "Moir". His costume was a "jupe" of orange velvet, breeches, and a doublet of shot-silk Spanish taffeta festooned with white satin passementerie. His hat was of yellow Spanish taffeta lined with orange.

Although Scottish merchants like Mungo Russell stocked many of the fabrics named in the record, some of the material was supplied by an English merchant, Baptist Hicks, and one of his former employees Humphrey Dethick came to the baptism of Duke Robert at Dunfermline Palace with tragic results. The cloth bought in England by Foulis and Jousie for the royal wardrobe was exempted from border customs at Berwick-upon-Tweed.

Anne of Denmark owned some clothes embroidered with pearls, and these valuable pieces were stolen by her goldsmith Jacob Kroger in 1597. The accounts mention satin bought to "reform" and "repair" gowns and velvet or damask fabrics to make new sleeves and bodices for gowns. The damask "bodies" were stiffened with whale baleen. In 1597, Anne of Denmark ordered an elaborate gown embroidered with jet beads and buttons which proved "over heavy" to wear and her tailor was ordered to start again.

In October 1600, after the Gowrie House affair, the French ambassador in London heard that Anne of Denmark (who was pregnant with Charles) kept to her chamber, in a state of undress, complaining of the absence of her servants, the sisters Beatrix and Barbara Ruthven who had been excluded by James VI. The banished courtier sisters may have usually helped her dress.

George Heriot supplied her with a number of richly embroidered costume accessories including stomachers, a "bend" or sash featuring flowers and beasts, mittens, scarves, an embroidered purse, and (for herself Henry and Charles) castor hats with feathers. In January 1603, six "tire dressings" or head dresses were bought for £50. Anne of Denmark appointed an "attire-maker" James Taylor, confirmed on 17 May 1603.

=== Masques in Scotland ===
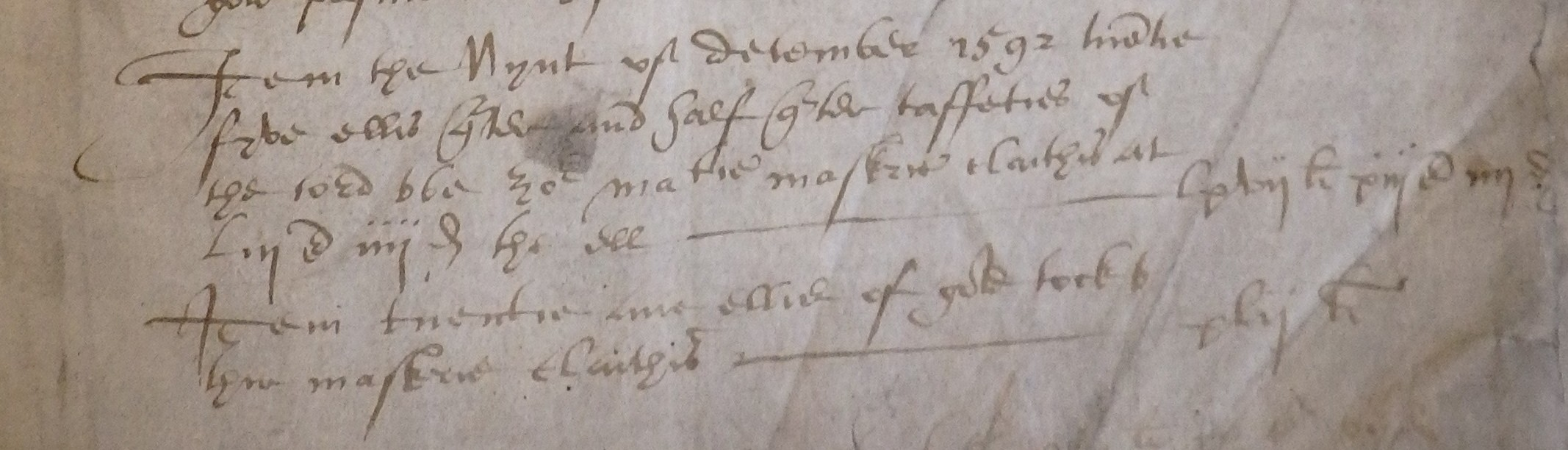
Wardrobe accounts for Anne of Denmark in Scotland include masque costume.

Lightweight costume in brightly coloured taffeta was bought for masques, theatrical performances held at the weddings of courtiers, where she and King James danced in special outfits described as "maskerye claythis". Outfits in red, grey, green, and blue taffetta, and blue taffeta, and gold and silver "tock" with red and white feather plumages for six dancers were made by Peter Rannald in September 1591. Venues for these celebrations included Tullibardine Castle in June 1591 and Alloa Tower on New Year's Day 1593. In England, Anne would further develop the masque form to articulate her queenship and female power.

=== Shoes ===
Anne of Denmark's shoes may have been made by Alexander Crawfurd, a "cordiner" in the Canongate who worked for King James, and, in England, by Francis Baker and Thomas Wilson. Wilson had a workshop on the Strand and made shoes for masques. In 1611 Henry Frederick, Prince of Wales paid for a poor boy from Woodstock to be his apprentice.

== England ==
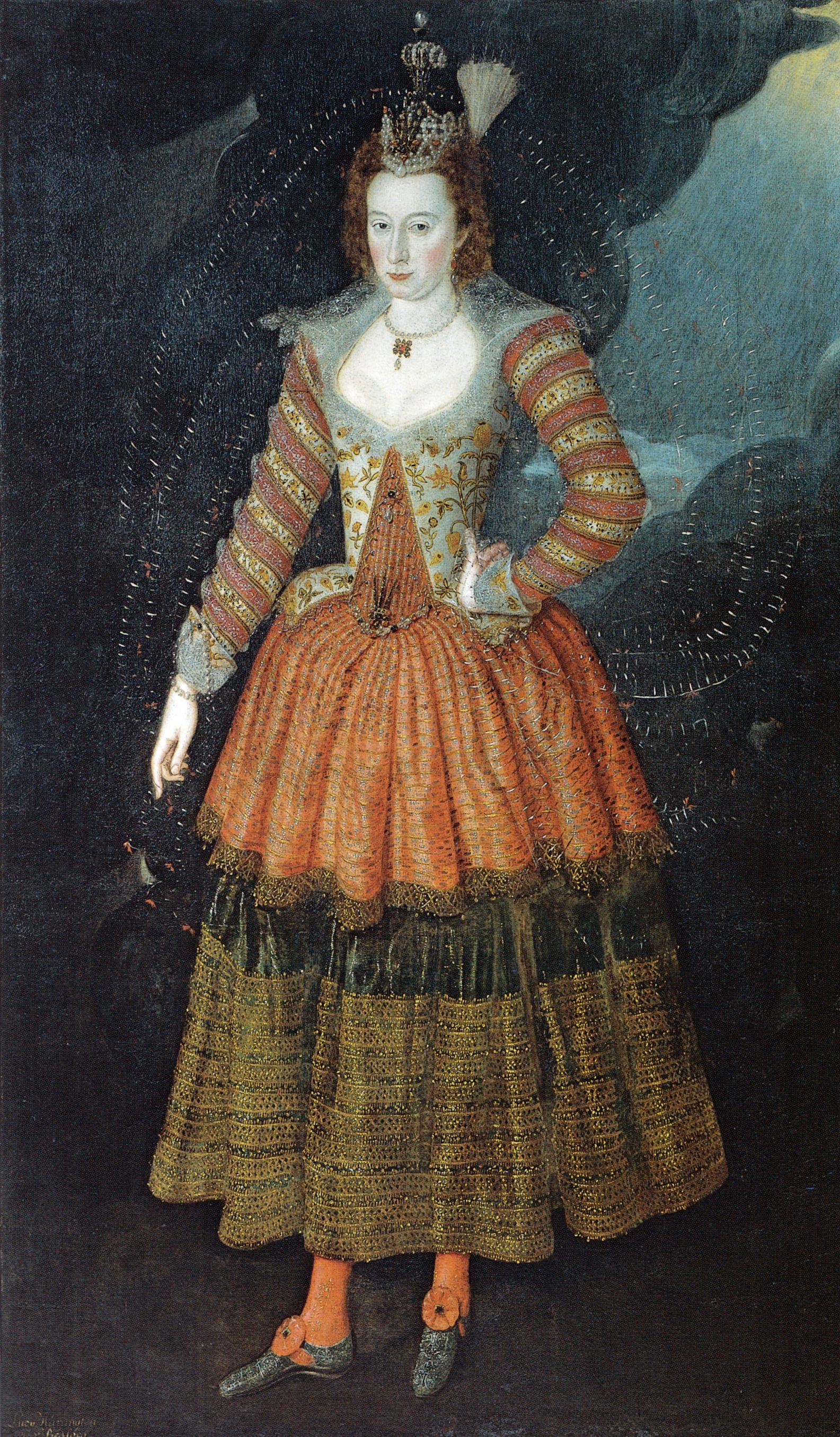
Courtier in costume designed by Inigo Jones for the masque Hymenaei, portrait by John de Critz.

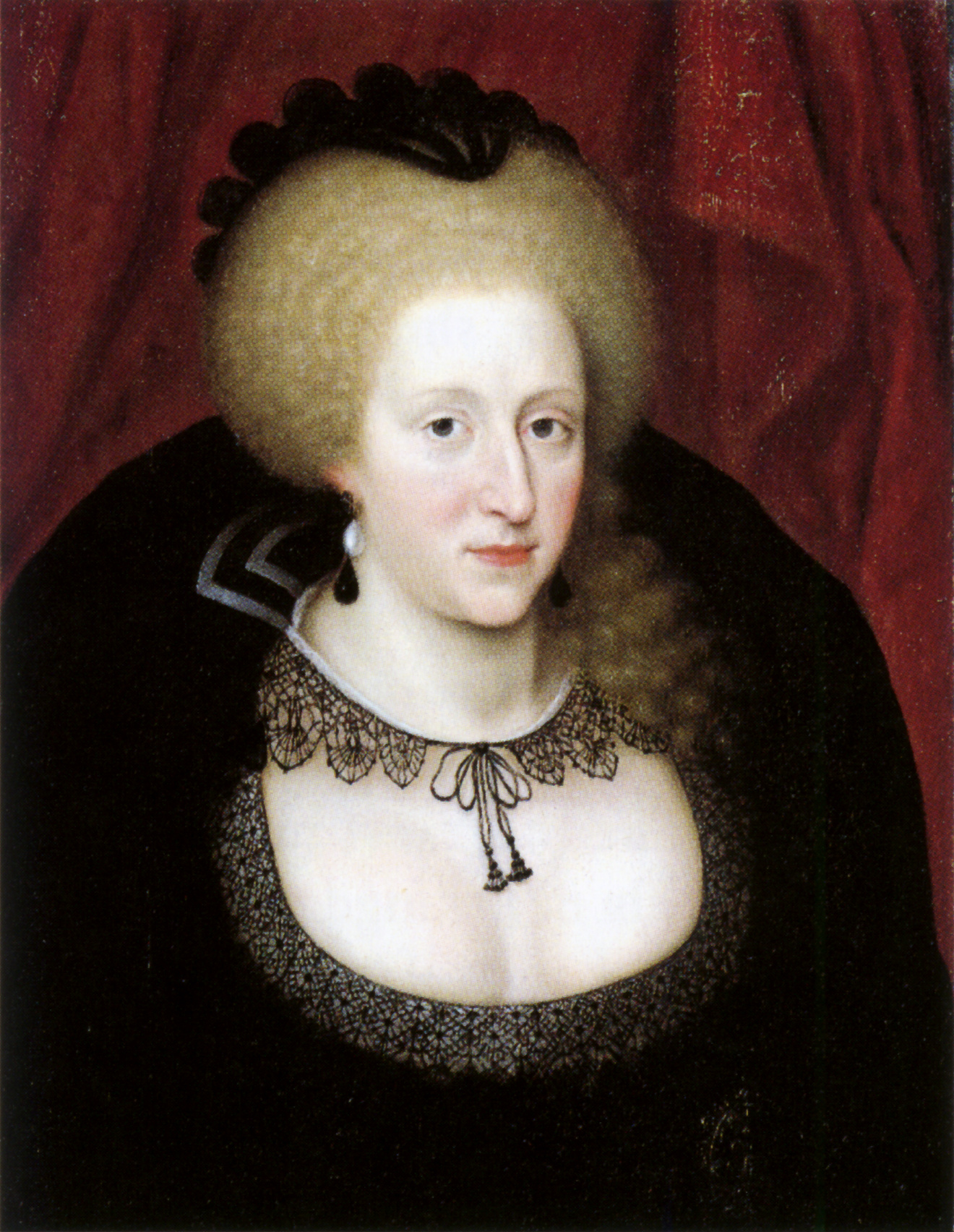
Anne of Denmark in mourning costume for Prince Henry in 1612, NPG.

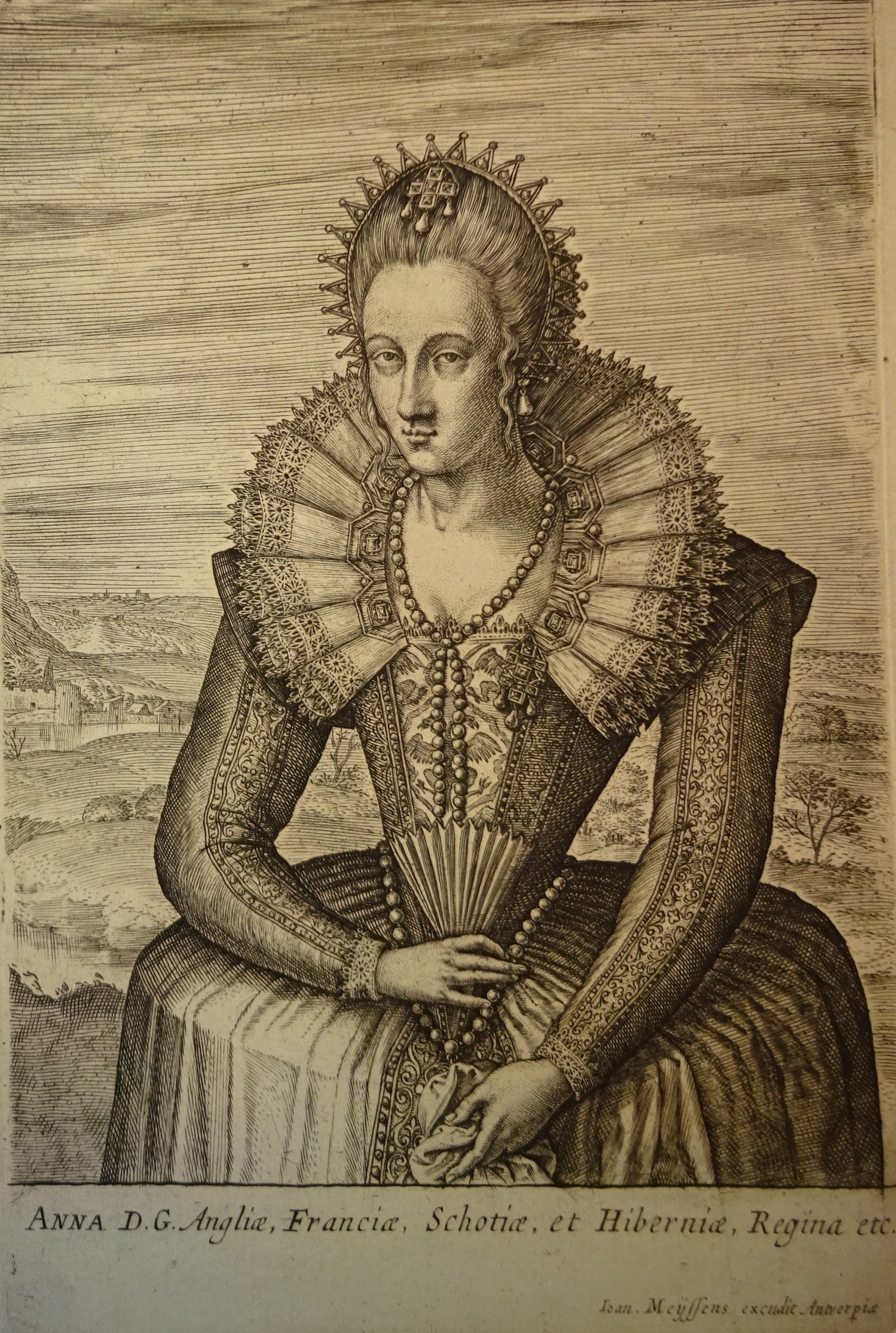
Anne of Denmark, Joannes Meyssens

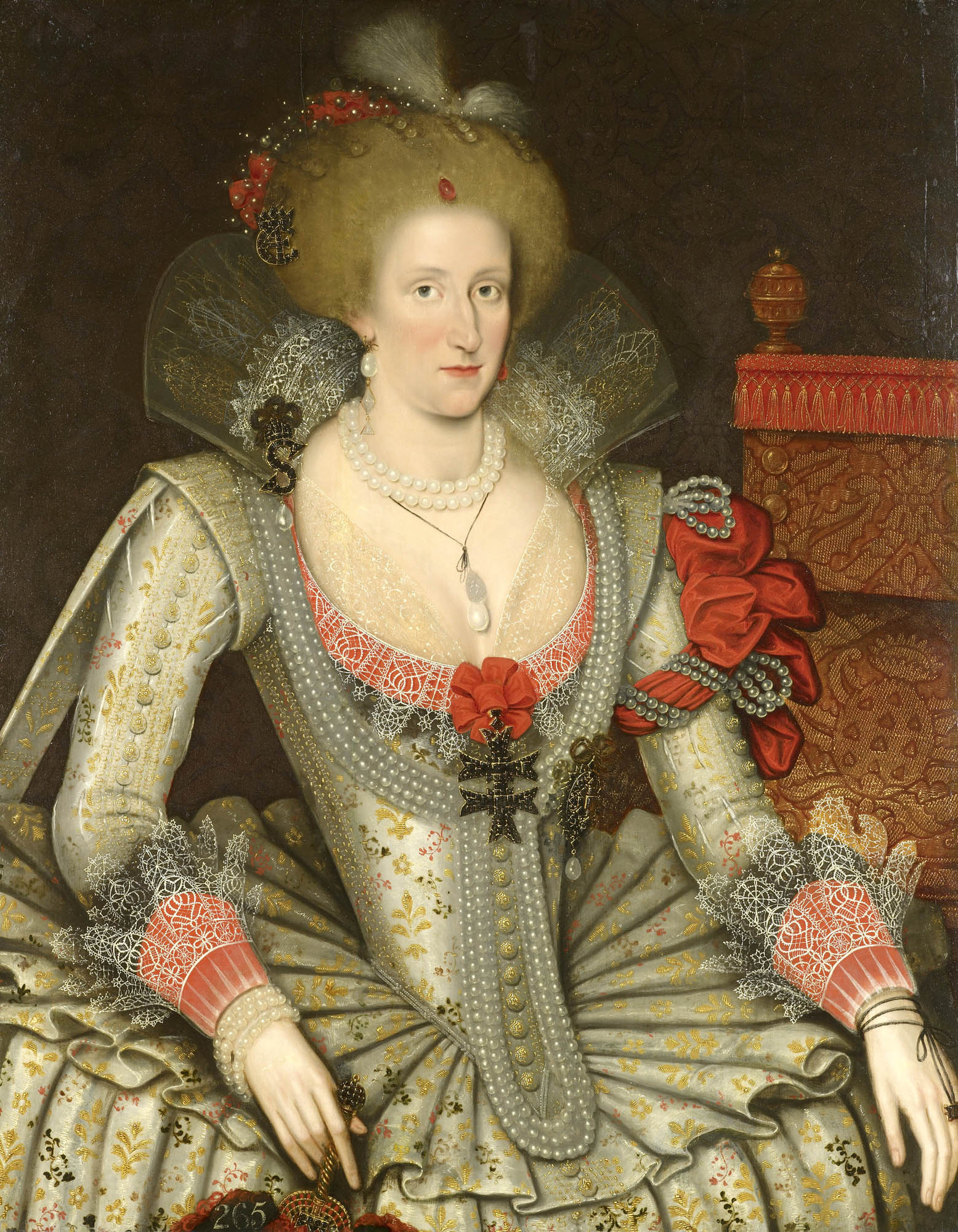
Anne of Denmark, c. 1614, by Marcus Gheeraerts the Younger, RCT.

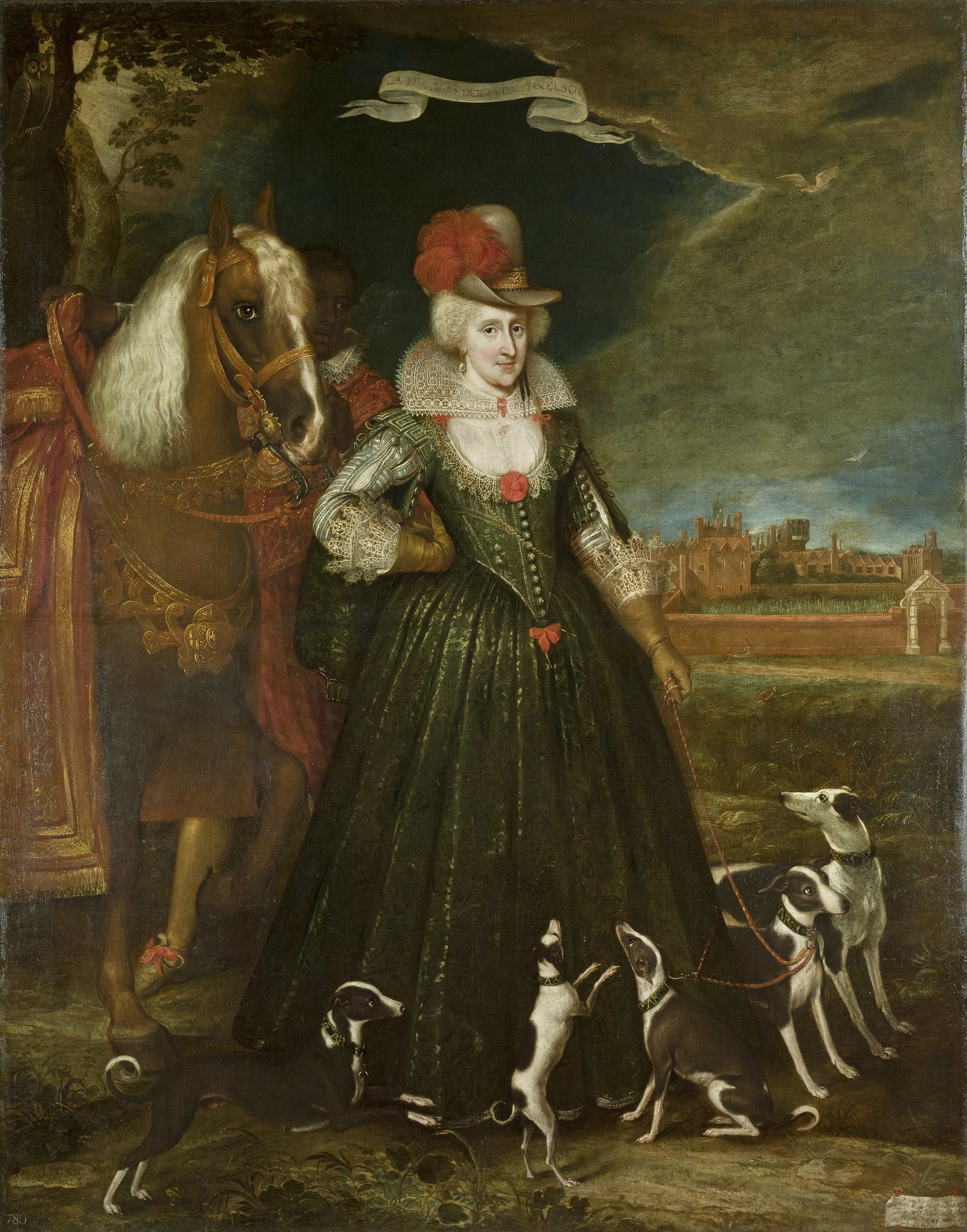
Anne of Denmark at Oatlands with an African servant, 1617, by Paul van Somer.

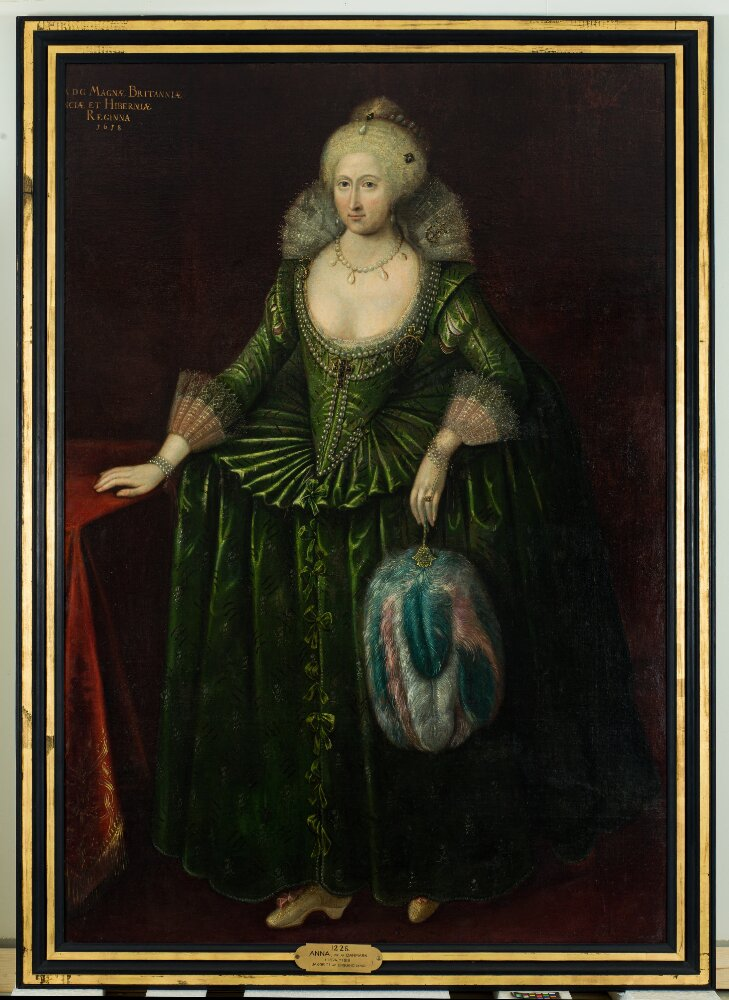
Anne of Denmark by Paul van Somer, Nationalmuseum.

At the Union of the Crowns in 1603, James became King of England. He travelled to England first. Anne of Denmark remained in Scotland and had a miscarriage at Stirling Castle. James wrote to her that she should not wear mourning clothes for Elizabeth I. Anne's preparations for leaving Scotland included a meeting on 4 May 1603 with the Earl of Linlithgow (who looked after Princess Elizabeth), Adam Newton (the tutor of Prince Henry), and Alexander Wilson, a tailor who made clothes for the royal children. They made an inventory or schedule of what clothes needed to be made in the next ten days before the journey.

There are indications that Anne changed her style to that of the English court by having some clothes altered. Fabrics were sent to her from England and new clothes were made for her household. The merchant Baptist Hicks provided velvet, cloth of gold and silver, grosgrain, tabine, tissue, sarcenet, taffeta, and satin. Some of Anne's gowns were "opened up" and enlarged into a "new fashion" with matching fabric. The change may have resulted in gowns suitable to be worn with a larger farthingale.

King James (who had travelled to England first) sent some of Elizabeth's jewels to Anne with an English hairdresser, Blanche Swansted. Giovanni Carlo Scaramelli, a Venetian diplomat, wrote that Anne of Denmark had given away her jewels, costume, and wall-hangings to her ladies remaining in Scotland, and would find six thousand gowns in Elizabeth's wardrobe which were being adjusted for her. John Chamberlain wrote that Elizabeth left "a well stored jewell house and a rich wardrobe of more than 2000 gownes with all things els answerable".

Dudley Carleton wrote that the new queen "giveth great contentment to the world in her fashion and courteous behaviour", and had a "comely personage and an extraordinary grace in her fashion". She had done her face "some wrong" by sunburn from not wearing a mask or visard during her journey to Windsor Castle. When the Spanish ambassador Juan Fernández de Velasco y Tovar, 5th Duke of Frías, arrived in August 1604 to negotiate the Treaty of London, Anne and her companions wore black masks while observing from a barge on the Thames. Even though their boat had no royal insignia, the Spaniards had no difficulty recognising them.

James and Anne were crowned at Westminster on 25 July 1603. Audrey Walsingham had been sent to meet Anne at Berwick-upon-Tweed and was appointed a lady of the bedchamber, and after the coronation she was made Mistress of the Robes. Records show that another of her new bedchamber ladies Bridget Markham bought dress accessories for her, such as lace, fringes, ribbons, and ordered embroidered waistcoats.

=== Queen Elizabeth's clothes ===
According to Arbella Stuart, Anne of Denmark asked Audrey Walsingham and the Countess of Suffolk to take Elizabeth's old clothes from a store in the Tower of London for a masque at New Year, The Vision of the Twelve Goddesses. Dudley Carleton described the masque costumes as "embroidered satins and cloths of gold and silver, for which they were beholden to Queen Elizabeth's wardrobe". The costumes were tailored by James Duncan. Anne, playing the part of Pallas, wore a brand new stage helmet made by Mary Mountjoy and skirts below the knee but shorter than was customary. Anne was also depicted in an engraving as Pallas, dressed in classical armour, "a figure at odds with wifely obedience and Jacobean pacifism".

It was said that George Home, 1st Earl of Dunbar, master of King's wardrobe, received a great quantity of Elizabeth's clothes as a gift from King James and he sold them for his own profit. Anne retained a small collection of the gowns and garments of previous queens of England and Henry VIII, which she kept at Somerset House. These were sold on her death in 1619.

=== Wardrobe staff and officers ===
Anne of Denmark's master tailor and yeoman of the robes was James Duncan, a Scot with Aberdeenshire connections. The court and royal households moved locations several times to avoid the plague that year, and "James Duncan's man" carried gowns from Winchester (where Anne had staged a masque) to Nonsuch and Oatlands for Princess Elizabeth and her companions. James Duncan also worked on masque costume, and may have worked with fabrics taken from the wardrobe of Elizabeth I for The Vision of the Twelve Goddesses.

George Abercromby, a Scottish knight, was gentleman of the Queen's robes. Ushers, or ushers of the wardrobe, were responsible for keeping account of her clothes and taking "provident care" of them. Henry Watkins was a page of the Queen's Robes in 1608. Susanna Greene was a laundress of the queen's personal linen and starched her ruffs.

=== Fashioning the Queen's household ===
The Queen's usual usual costume now included large drum farthingales which were made by Robert Hughes in his Strand and Bow Lane workshops. Their size was noted by diplomats including the Venetian priest Horatio or Orazino Busino. Experimental reconstructions show that the farthingales were unlikely to have been quite as big as exaggerated contemporary reports. There is also some uncertainty if Anne's use of large farthingales was in keeping with the fashion of other courts, and some scholars have argued that her preference for farthingales deliberately emulated the style of her predecessor in England, Elizabeth I.

The dress of her gentlewomen and ladies in waiting was probably distinctive. Portraits exist of Anne Livingstone and Anne Coningsby Tracy as maids of honour (in costume with similarities to Elizabeth's maids in latter years), and Anne of Denmark owned a portrait of Mary Middlemore. Livingstone was depicted with the deep décolletage seen in many Jacobean portraits, Coningsby's neckline is more Elizabethan. Sir Edward Herbert fought with a Scottish usher who had snatched a ribbon or "topknot" from Mary Middlemore's hair in a back room of the queen's lodgings at Greenwich Palace. The incident nearly led to a duel.

Lady Anne Clifford avoided opportunities to join the households of Anne or her daughter Princess Elizabeth, but in 1646 had herself depicted as young adult in the "Great Picture", approximating the style worn at Anne's court. She mentions in her Diary attending court in a favourite sea-water green satin gown without a farthingale in November 1617. Her gowns were made "to wear with open ruffs after the French fashion".

Anne and women in her circle are often depicted in their portraits wearing a black silk cord or lace around their wrist, attached to a ring. This seems to be an adaptation of wearing jewels on silken cords at the neck, and may be related to the widespread public mourning at the death of Henry Frederick, Prince of Wales.

=== The Cambridge inventory ===
An inventory of Anne's clothes made in 1611 (now held by Cambridge University Library) details many items of her costume, including the skirts and petticoats worn over the farthingale support. Some of these had elaborate embroidery, featuring birds, wild beasts, fruit bats, and architectural motifs, and had been New Year's Day gifts from courtiers. The inventory records that Anne gave gifts of clothes to courtiers like Thomazine Carew, who received a black satin gown in a plain bias cut, and another black gown with blue "galloons" or lace strips in February 1610. Embroidered crimson satin from a petticoat or skirt reused as an altar cloth, now held by the Burrell Collection (Acc. 29.314), may be a survivor from Anne's wardrobe. Anne gave away one of her white satin petticoats as a New Year's Day gift on 1 January 1611, listed in the inventory as:

One petticote of white sattine Imbroydred alover butt moste Fayrest in a border 3 quarters deepe with rinninge workes of venice gold and purle with 12 broad squares of the Foresayd gold with severall Devices in eache square Intermixte with Dyvers Sorts of fruits Fowells and fyshes: with a gard one each Syde the border with Imagerie worke & fowles, edged with gold and Silver bone lace and Linde with yelow and white taffeta.

(in modernised spelling) One petticoat of white satin embroidered all over, but most fairest in a border 3 quarters deep with running works of Venice gold and purl, with 12 broad squares of the foresaid gold with several devices in each square, intermixted with diverse sorts of fruits, fowls, and fishes: with a gard (border) on each side, the border with imagery work & fowls, edged with gold and silver bone lace and lined with yellow and white taffeta.

=== Suppliers and artisans ===
William Stone in Cheapside was a major supplier of fabrics in her first years in England, and had sent silks to Scotland in 1589 for the royal wedding. Anne of Denmark bought fabrics from "Elias Tillier" or "Filliar", a linen draper. Agents for the late Thomas Woodward, a mercer to Anne of Denmark who also provided fabrics for masques, obtained a payment of £3,720 in November 1627, and interest payments on another sum owed to Woodward as "late mercer to Queen Ann" continued to made by David Cunningham of Auchenharvie, a receiver of royal rents.

François Blondeau was Anne's parfumier, retained to scent stored robes and perfume gloves. Thomas Wilson and Francis Baker made the queen's shoes, Baker attended the funeral of Prince Henry. Wilson, whose premises were on the Strand, also made shoes for Anne's son, Prince Henry who paid for a poor boy from Woodstock to be his apprentice. Hugh Griffiths made silk stockings for the Queen. Ribbons and passementerie were provided by silkmen, including Thomas Henshawe and his son Benjamin Henshawe.

=== Silkwomen ===
Dorothy Speckard, who had worked for Elizabeth I, became a silkwoman to Anne of Denmark. She was in charge of Anne's linen and stockings in 1619. The French-born Esther or Hester Le Tellier née Granges, was also her silkwoman, and may have worked for Anne in Scotland. In 1603, after the Union of the Crowns, she delivered "diverse parcels of lawn, cambric, needlework, purls, bone lace" and other materials to the lady in waiting Jane Drummond. Hester was the wife of the goldsmith Elias Le Tellier, and is thought to have been an aunt of the miniature painter David des Granges.

Anne was interested in the production of silk and set up a silkworm house at Oatlands. The windows of the new building were decorated with her heraldry. King James cultivated silkworms at Theobalds, paying an allowance from 1617 to the keeper Munten Jennings.

=== Embroiderers ===
Some embroidery was worked by Christopher Shawe and he also made masque costumes used at court during performances held at New Year. The 1611 inventory includes some items made for Tethys' Festival.

Zachary Bethell, an usher, kept the wardrobe accounts and made inventories, George Abercromby made payments, and Christopher Mills (died 1638) was clerk. Shawe was not paid as promptly as he wished for his work and had to petition for payment.

=== Expense ===
The expenses of Anne's "apparel and the entertainment of her servants" were intended to be met by an annual income of £30,000 from crown lands, the yearly amount spent on clothes alone was said to be £8,000.

At the wedding of her daughter Princess Elizabeth in 1613, Anne wore white satin, with a head attire featuring pear-shaped pearls, and other jewels said to be worth £40,000. Baptist Hicks provided cloth of tissue and silks worth £330, and Thomas Woodward provided tissue, satin, and silk worth £371. John Spence made a farthingale and bodice for Princess Elizabeth costing £30.

== Funeral and the wardrobe ==
Anne's laundry staff and "sewsters" who attended the funeral of Prince Henry in 1612 were Mrs Grene, Burneby, Swynburne, and Joyce. Christopher Mills was Clerk of the Wardrobe or Clerk of the Robes. "Hugon" was Warden Yeoman of the Wardrobe. When Anne of Denmark died, Dorothy Speckard provided a veil edged with lace for the funeral effigy or "representation". The robes for the effigy were perfumed by Mary Cob with musk, civet, and ambergris.

Wardrobe staff and suppliers attended Anne of Denmark's funeral on 13 May 1619 and walked in the procession, including Dorothy Speckard (who walked as a lady of the Privy Chamber), Hester Tillier, Blanche Swansted, and Elizabeth Rider. Rider was in charge of the queen's laundry. She was the mother of Jane Whorwood and subsequently married James Maxwell, 1st Earl of Dirletoun.

An inventory of Somerset House, then known as Denmark House, made after her death in 1619 by Francis Gofton includes very few items of her clothing. The wardrobe store contents there included embroidered "sweet bags" for perfume, beds and bedding, and "turkey carpets" and "carpets of Persia". Other miscellaneous items kept in chests include scarves of sea-water green taffeta and carnation taffeta embroidered with pearls. Francis Bacon wrote that these were the colours that showed best by candlelight at masques.
