= Peter Rannald =

Peter Rannald (died 1609) was a Scottish tailor who worked for Anne of Denmark, the wife of James VI of Scotland. He made her gowns and the costumes she wore at masques.

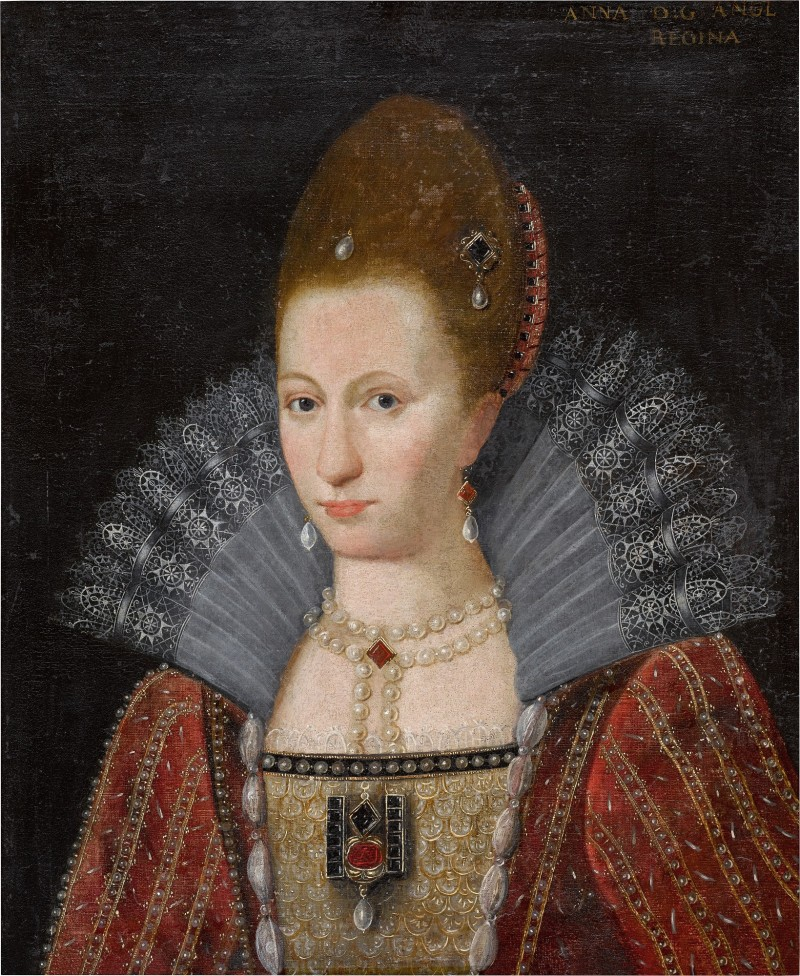
Peter Rannald made clothes for Anne of Denmark

== Background ==
He was probably a relation of Patrick Rannald, who appears in contemporary records as a bonnet-maker in Edinburgh's Canongate and as a Deacon of the Edinburgh craft of bonnetmakers. Peter Rannald began working for Anne of Denmark in Edinburgh in the summer of 1591, after her Danish tailor Paul Rey returned home. Paul Rey had made the queen a set of riding clothes in July 1590, including a cloak and safeguard of Spanish incarnadine satin lined with taffeta.

== Fabrics to costume a royal court ==
Peter Rannald, and two other Scottish tailors, Peter Sanderson and William Simpson, made clothes for the queen as directed by the Danish master of her wardrobe Søren Jonson. The fabrics were mostly sourced by Robert Jousie, who with his business partner Thomas Foulis, was paid from sums of money given to James VI by Elizabeth I.

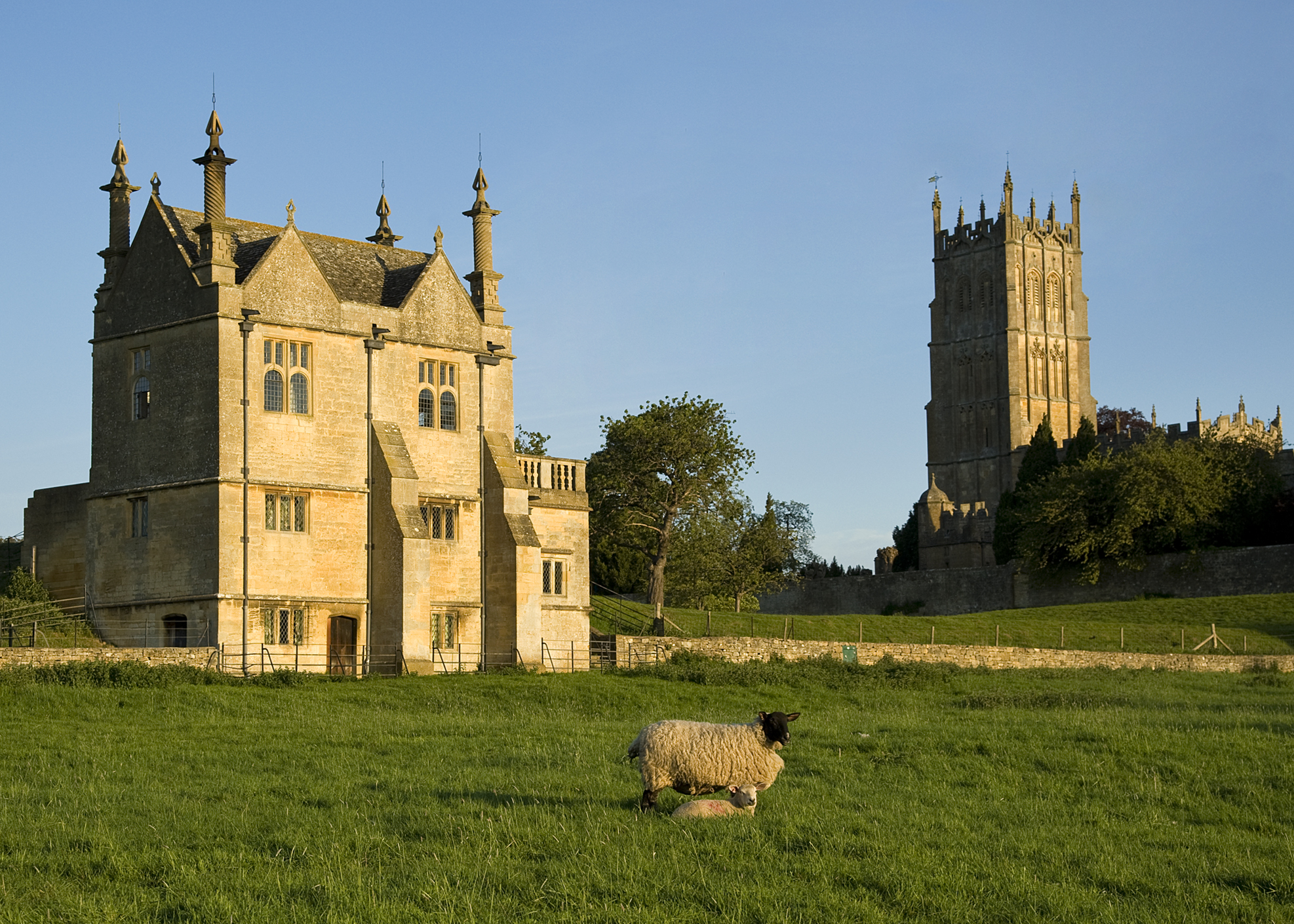
Baptist Hicks was able to embellish his house at Chipping Campden when he was paid by James VI and I

Surviving records held by the National Archives of Scotland detail the fabrics delivered to Peter Rannald to make the queen's gowns and other garments. The Scottish record does not reveal where Foulis and Jousie bought the fabrics for royal costume, but other sources show that the English merchant Baptist Hicks was a major supplier to the Scottish court in the 1590s. Hicks wrote that he had supplied materials for the masque at the baptism of Prince Henry in 1594.

== Working for a queen ==
Rannald made clothes which the queen gave to her ladies and serving women as gifts and as a trousseau at their marriages. He made clothes for Margaret Vinstarr and a wedding dress of cloth of gold and cloth of silver for Marie Stewart, Countess of Mar.

In September 1591 Peter Rannald made clothes for masque dancing for Anne of Denmark and some of her courtiers. The costumes involved taffeta with metallic or tinsel "tock" fabrics, and six plumes of red and white feathers. The occasion of this masque is not recorded, but other costumed dances and costumes can be associated with the weddings of courtiers. The record for the costume for "maskerye clayths" made by Peter Rannald in September 1591 includes:

- 18 ells of red and 18 ells white grey taffeta,
- 4 ells of green and 4 ells of blue and 4 ells of yellow taffeta, £126 Scots for all the taffeta.
- 18 ells of tock of gold and 18 ells of tock of silver, £70 Scots.
- 3 ounces of silk and a half ounce of white silk to work the clothes, £5-6s-8d. Scots
- 48 ells of small buckram to line the clothes, £43-4s. Scots.
- 6 six great "plumages" red and white, £27 Scots.

In October 1591 Rannald sewed gold passementerie onto a gown made from grey velvet from Denmark. The fabric was probably sent to Anne by her mother, Sophie of Mecklenburg-Güstrow. In May 1592, Rannald was given London black cloth to make a cloak for himself, and in August 1594 fine black velvet for a garment, perhaps to wear at the baptism of Prince Henry at Stirling Castle.

== Rannald family connections ==
Another Edinburgh tailor, Nicoll Spence or Spens, had worked with Paul Rey and in 1591 made clothes for Anne of Denmark's Danish gentlewomen, Sophie Kaas and Katrina Skinkell. He had worked for Mary, Queen of Scots, and Margaret Stewart, Mistress of Ochiltree, who became an important figure in the Anne of Denmarks's household. When Nicoll Spens died in 1599, Thomas Rannald, a hatmaker, and Nicoll Rannald were witnesses to his will. Spens was owed money for making clothes for Dorothea Stewart, Countess of Gowrie, and Marie Ruthven, Countess of Atholl. On 3 April 1603, Thomas Rannald joined the royal household as master hat-maker and haberdasher as the successor of John Hepburn.

== Death ==
Peter Rannald died in 1609. His widow Jonnett Birs petitioned for payment of £1,300 Scots, a sum recorded on a royal precept or order dating from 1595. King James asked for confirmation that such an old debt was still outstanding.
