= Peter Sanderson (tailor) =

Peter Sanderson was an Edinburgh tailor who worked for Anne of Denmark wife of James VI of Scotland.

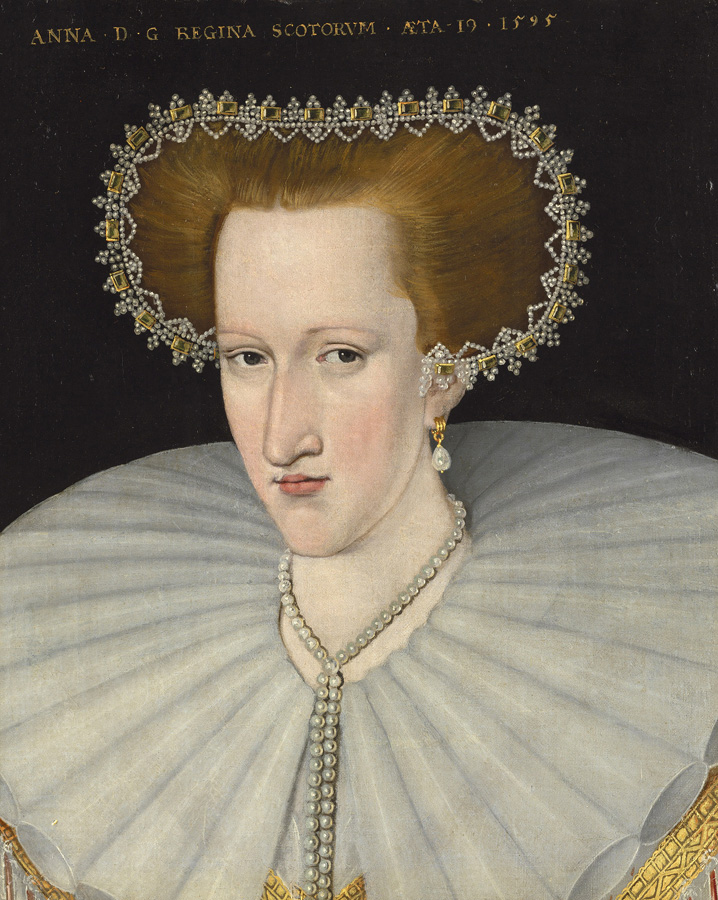
Anne of Denmark, by Adrian Vanson

== Tailoring in the 1580s ==
He became a burgess of Edinburgh in 1587 by his marriage to Alison or Helena Cranstoun, a daughter of Cuthbert Cranstoun, a furrier.

Sanderson's clients in the late 1580s included Christian Douglas, Lady Home, the first wife of Alexander Home, 1st Earl of Home. Lady Home bought textiles from the merchant John Robertson, which were delivered to her tailors Sanderson and David Lyon. They made gowns and clothes for her, her children, her pages, and other family members. Sanderson added passementerie to her gowns and stiffened and formed the shoulders with grey cloth. John Robertson supplied clothes for the royal pages and lackeys. The library of the University of Edinburgh has a similar account for textiles bought by Margaret Livingstone.

== Working for Anne of Denmark ==
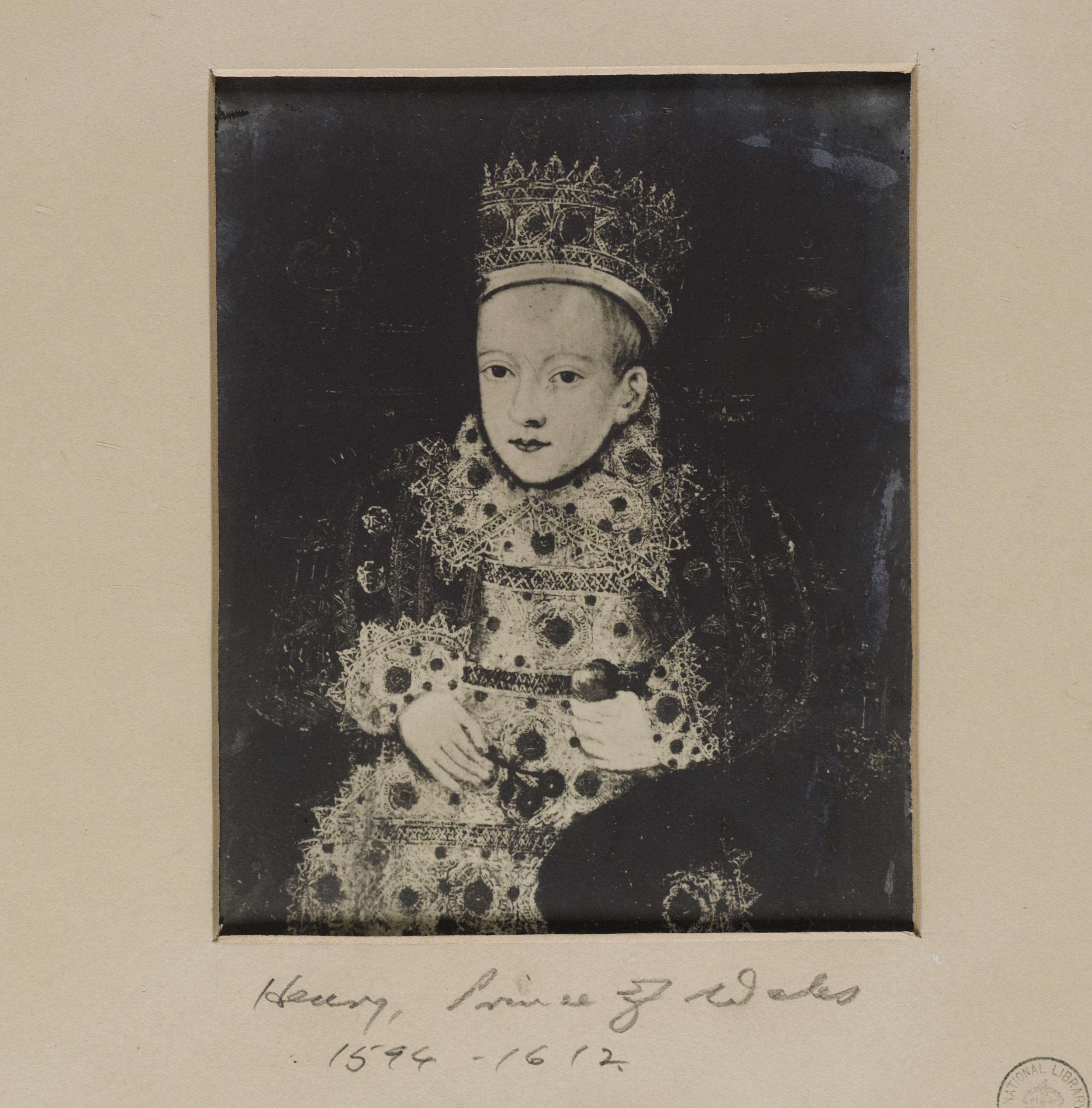
Scottish portrait of Prince Henry wearing a costume decorated with lace

Anne of Denmark brought a number of household servants and artisans with her from Denmark, including a tailor Paul Rey who made clothes for the queen until the summer of 1591. Three Scottish tailors, Sanderson, Peter Rannald, and William Simpson filled his place. In the 1590s James VI's tailor was Alexander Miller, who replaced James Inglis.

The annual wage of the queen's tailor in 1591 was £100 and the foreman tailor had £40. By May 1599, Sanderson received a monthly payment called an "outlivery" of £30 paid from Anne of Denmark's household account (now National Records of Scotland E31/17).

Sanderson made gowns for the queen, and also pairs of baleen bodies of satin lined with green and incarnadine taffeta. He made clothes for several women of the queen's household, as gifts from the queen, including a black velvet wedding gown with gold passementerie for Marie Young, a daughter of the King's former tutor and librarian Peter Young. He made clothes for Princess Elizabeth (and a gown for Beatrix Ruthven to wear at Elizabeth's baptism), for Prince Henry, Prince Charles, Princes Margaret, and a purple velvet side-coat for Lord Gordon when he was a hostage at court.

Accounts of the fabrics supplied to Anne of Denmark and James VI in the 1590s by a Edinburgh merchant Robert Jousie survive in the National Records of Scotland. Jousie worked in partnership with a goldsmith Thomas Foulis administering a subsidy sent by Queen Elizabeth. Sanderson's work is mentioned many times, as in these entries for making two bodices and new sleeves and a bodice for one of the queen's gowns:

Item the 29 of October 1595 deliverit to Peter Sandersone with Sorne (Søren Johnson) fyve ellis and ane half Spainzie taffetie to be tua pair of balene bodeis __ [£38-10s.]
Item the 25 of Januar 1595/6 deliverit to Peter Sandersone thrie ellis and ane halff of blak twa pyle velvot to be new bodeis and slevis to ane velvot goun __ [£49.]

Sanderson, or possibly Peter Rannald, made a gown of "double burret" silk for Anne of Denmark in June 1597 loaded with jet passementerie and buttons. The gown was too heavy to wear and she ordered it to be remade with less jet. In May 1599, he made clothes for the two Princesses to wear at Margaret's baptism.

In 1600 Sanderson went to law over a debt of £54 owed by Libra Hamilton, Lady Ayton and her husband William Hume, for workmanship and merchandise supplied to Lady Ayton and her daughters and servants.

A signed bill from "Peter Sandersoun" for clothes for Princess Elizabeth in 1602 survives at the National Records of Scotland. It includes gowns with "stenting, stiffing, clasps and wire", a farthingale costing 20 shillings, and with a few items for her brothers and clothes for pages, totals £154 Scots. Items mentioned in the treasurer's accounts made for Princess Elizabeth include; a gown of Spanish taffeta lined with plush, a gown of figured velvet with white on incarnate satin sleeves, and a night gown with a "wyliecoit" petticoat for nightwear.

Sanderson went to England after the Union of Crowns in 1603 and joined the household of Princess Elizabeth and Prince Henry at Oatlands as the court tailor. Another Scottish tailor, Patrick Black, was in the Prince's service in 1605, and Edinburgh town council allowed him to be a burgess despite his absence in London.

Peter Rannald, who had been one of the queen's tailors, died in 1609, and his widow Jonnett Birs petitioned for payment of £1,300 Scots from a royal precept dating from 1595. King James asked for confirmation that such an old debt was still outstanding.

Sanderson returned to Edinburgh and there are several records of him pursuing bad debts from aristocratic clients. His daughter Anna married John Cunningham, a tailor, in 1613. In 1630 his widow, Helen Cranstoun, petitioned Charles I for unpaid tailoring bills of Anne of Denmark totalling £3000 Scots.
