= Robert Jousie =

Scottish textile merchant, financier and courtier (died 1626)

Robert Jousie (or Joussie or Jowsie or Jossie; died 1626) was a Scottish textile merchant, financier, and courtier. He was involved in the collection and administration of the English subsidy of James VI. Jousie supplied fabrics used at the baptism of Prince Henry (1594), and for the clothes of Prince Henry and Princess Elizabeth.

== Life ==
Jousie was a cloth merchant based in Edinburgh with a house on the High Street or Royal Mile. His father James Jousie was also a textile merchant who supplied fabrics to tailors, and was paid £26-4s-7d Scots by the royal treasurer in December 1578. James Jousie died on 28 December 1578.

Robert Jousie became an exclusive supplier of fabrics to James VI of Scotland and Anne of Denmark. His accounts for fabrics supplied to the king and queen survive in the National Archives of Scotland, and have been quoted by historians including Hugo Arnot, who noted that James VI bought ostrich feathers and beaver hats. The record includes masque costumes for James VI and Anne of Denmark, who danced in masques at weddings in the first years of the 1590s. The masque clothes included lightweight taffeta and metallic tinsel or "tock" fabrics. Fabrics in Jousie's account include; Spanish taffeta, Naples, Genoa and Lucca silks satins and velvets, and Florence ribbon.

=== Royal marriage and English money ===
Jousie lent money to the Scottish ambassador William Stewart, Commendator of Pittenweem, who was sent to Denmark in 1588, 1589, and 1590 to negotiate a marriage for King James to a Danish princess. Jousie also supplied silks and velvets to Stewart, and his debt totalled 3,600 merks. Stewart helped negotiate the marriage of James VI and Anne of Denmark.

Partnered with the goldsmith and financier Thomas Foulis, James VI sent Jousie to London in July 1589 to buy clothes and ornaments in preparation for his marriage and the celebrations and Anne's coronation. James gave the two merchants a pledge of two cut rubies and three cabochon rubies set in gold "chattons" or buttons from the crown jewels in place of cash for these purchases.

In 1590 Sir William Keith of Delny, out-going Keeper of the Royal Wardrobe, paid Jousie 10,000 Scottish merks for silk fabrics already supplied to the king. Jousie was owed a further £19,000 for "apparel and other necessaries" supplied to the king at the time of marriage. The Chancellor of Scotland, John Maitland, 1st Lord Maitland of Thirlestane paid him £4,000 Scots from the subsidy money which Elizabeth I gave to James VI. Jousie also supplied velvet and passementerie to Edinburgh burgh council for the Entry and Coronation of Anne of Denmark.

Jousie and Foulis sometimes went to London to collect the English subsidy. Chancellor Maitland paid Jousie £4,000 Scots from the subsidy in August 1590. In December 1591, Jousie was detained or delayed for a time in Berwick-upon-Tweed, and James wrote to Elizabeth of his "endless detaining" and an errand "turned from one honorable annuity to a voluntary uncertainty with long begging".

Some subsidy payments collected in London from James Hudson were recorded in a memorandum of royal finance formerly at Hopetoun House and now held by the British Library. These were £9,000 Scots in 1591 and £5,791-10s in 1592. In April 1593 an English ambassador Lord Burgh in Scotland and the resident diplomat Robert Bowes borrowed £300 sterling from Robert Jousie, Thomas Foulis, and John Porterfield in order to reward potential supporters of English policy.

=== Textiles for the royal wardrobes ===
In the 1590s, Robert Jousie supplied fabrics to the tailors Alexander Miller and Peter Sanderson who worked for the keepers of the royal wardrobes Sir George Home and Søren Johnson. Jousie kept detailed account of the fabrics supplied to the royal wardrobes, which are held by the National Records of Scotland and are mostly unpublished.

The fabric contract was in part financed by money sent as a gift or subsidy to James VI by Queen Elizabeth. Lady Thirlestane's account for August 1590 includes a payment of £4000 Scots to Joussie. A surviving account of the subsidy money kept by Foulis includes a payment in July 1594 of £18,280 Scots to the wardrobe account kept by Jousie. In February 1596, Jousie noted that he had spent £71,513 on clothes for Anne of Denmark over the previous six years.

In May 1594, when Jousie was in London, his obligation of 3,000 merks to the Master of Work, William Schaw was paid by William Napier of Wrychtishouses and John Gourlay. Jousie provided textiles for the Masque at the baptism of Prince Henry in 1594. As well as money from the English subsidy, the magnificent display at Stirling was financed by using Anna of Denmark's dowry, which had been invested in various towns. Jousie received £1000 from Aberdeen.

Some of the textiles used at the baptism were provided by an English merchant, Baptist Hicks, but the chance survival of Jousie's own tailor's account book shows that fabric and accessories were also bought in Edinburgh. The tailor Patrick Nimmo supplied green silk buttons and points to Jousie for one of the king's outfits in June 1597. The corresponding entry for the cost of Nimmo's green buttons appears in the king's wardrobe account for July 1597. Nimmo dressed Jousie in a black bombazine doublet and jupe, with black silk breeches fitted with pockets.

Sir Robert Melville resigned as Treasurer of Scotland in March 1595. He owed Jousie £20,000 which the king undertook to repay. His daughter-in-law, Margaret Ker, owed Jousie a personal debt of £233. In September 1597 Jousie went to London to collect the annuity and carried letters from John Lindsay of Balcarres to William and Robert Cecil. He was delayed in England waiting for the subsidy. James VI wrote to Elizabeth I about his "endless detaining", saying that Jousie's "errand, it is turned from an honourable annuity to a voluntary uncertainty almost after long begging". Jousie obtained the money, and recorded that he paid £20 sterling as a fee to the "telleris and utheris officaris of the excheker hous att my ressait of his majesties annuitye as use is".

=== Bankrupt ===
Foulis was bankrupted in 1598. He gave a statement of his debts to Parliament, which included £145,700 and interest on that sum to £33,000 Scots. The roll submitted to Parliament listed the names of the creditors of Foulis and Jousie, who had loaned them money with which they financed the court. It includes the Edinburgh Company of Tailors, based on the Cowgate, who had lent £1,200, the merchant and poet John Burell, and Bartholomew Kello, the husband of the calligrapher Esther Inglis. Kello's loan of £4,000 was one of the larger contributions, and the merchant Jacob Baron had invested £14,822 Scots.

In May 1598 James Hudson wrote that Foulis had pawned a gold lion set with a ruby worth £400 with the London goldsmith Robert Brook of Lombard Street, which Hudson suggested belonged to James VI. Robert Jousie was unable to pay Brook's interest or other sums due by Hudson, or the money they jointly owed to Hudson. Hudson considered having Jousie arrested for debt in London.

Foulis and Jousie were given a contract to operate the Scottish mint, undertaking to pay £5,000 to the crown each year. Despite the bankruptcy, the purchasing arrangement for the royal wardrobe continued, and Foulis bought a sapphire engraved with Elizabeth's portrait in London for Anna of Denmark in January 1599. However, the English creditors of Thomas Foulis arrested Jousie in London for debts and he was imprisoned for a time. Despite the efforts of James Elphinstone, the Secretary of State, Sir Robert Cecil could not assist to free him until there was some assurance of repayment. In February 1599 the Privy Council declared that in future the Treasurer would administer the English annuity or subsidy, spending it on clothes for the royal family and the household of Prince Henry.

The English textile merchant and financier Baptist Hicks wrote to James VI on 1 March 1599 hoping for repayment of sums due to him by Jousie. He had written twice to the king, and was disappointed to hear from the Scottish ambassador that he would not be paid from the annuity awarded by Queen Elizabeth. Hicks claimed in 1606 that he was still owed money for textiles sent to Scotland in the 1590s, having expected payment from the subsidy paid to James VI.

=== England ===
In England, after the Union of the Crowns, Jousie was appointed Groom of the Bedchamber, Groom or Yeoman of the Robes, and deputy Keeper of the Privy Purse, in the years 1606 to 1611. He was Yeoman of the Robes to Prince Henry.

In October 1606 George Home, now the Earl of Dunbar, sent him to give money to the minister Andrew Melville and his colleagues, in packets disguised as sugar loaves.

Jousie bought an estate at Baynards in Surrey in 1610. When William Betoun, the embroiderer to the royal family in Scotland, died in 1620, Robert Jousie still owed him 800 merks.

=== Death and will ===
Robert Jousie died in London in 1626, without making a will, and details of his family are unclear. The historian Dr Robert Johnston (d. 1639) was at his deathbed. Johnston, a member of the Newbie family, was one of the trustees of George Heriot's will.

== Family ==
Jousie's wife was called Margaret. They had two sons and a daughter.

- James Jousie or Jossey alias Hay (died 1642), mortgaged their interests in the Baynards estate to Richard Gurnard or Gurney (d. 1647), a London clothworker. Gurney sold it to Richard Evelyn, the father of diarist John Evelyn, who acquired the whole property in 1631. James Jousie of Baynards married a daughter of George Heriot (1563-1624), Elizabeth Band or Heriot.
- Robert Jousie, who went to Spain with Prince Charles in 1623, and came to Edinburgh in 1633 with Charles I as Yeoman of the Robes.
- Elizabeth (b. 1609), described as a gentlewoman, married James Heriot (d. 1634) on 4 January 1624. He was a jeweller to Charles I of England, and a son of George Heriot (died 1610), at St Mary Magdalen, Bermondsey. After James Heriot's death, Elizabeth Jousie married David Cunningham of Robertland in 1637, who corresponded with his cousin, the receiver of royal rents, David Cunningham of Auchenharvie about the match. Auchenharvie mentioned her in his letters as Heriot's "sweet bedfellow" and wrote in 1635 that "she is yet a widow but not like to continue, being much importuned with sundry suitors of quality". Auchenharvie sided with Elizabeth Jousie and Robert Jousie junior in a lawsuit in 1636.

A friend and relation, John Jousie (d. 1621), was a wealthy Scottish merchant resident in London. He made Robert Joussie of Baynards and Robert Johnston his executors and left money to Johnson and Robert Jousie's friend, John Fortune. He made several legacies in Scottish money and to the poor in the Hospital of Edinburgh. His son, also John Jousie, may have been a merchant in Edinburgh.

Another member of the Heriot family, also called George Heriot, who died in London in July 1625 was described as Robert Jousie's servitor or servant.

== A cargo in 1586 ==
A list of goods belonging to Robert Jousie in a ship's cargo of 1586 survives to give some idea of his business. He lost; a dozen hats lined with taffeta worth £20; 15 beaver hats worth £76, 12 hats lined with taffeta worth £27; 36 hat bands worth £14; 24 hat bands of silk crêpe worth £23; 12 crêpe hat bands worth £6; 24 hat bands for children worth 22 shillings. The ship had run aground in Norfolk.

== Robert Jousie's house in Edinburgh ==
In June 1593 Jousie's house in Edinburgh was the scene of a scandalous abduction, while he was travelling to London. James Gray, a servant of James VI and brother of the Master of Gray, had abducted and married Catherine Carnegie daughter of John, Laird of Carnegie, and niece of David Carnegie of Colluthie. She protested and was given a refuge in Robert Jousie's house. Gray sent his friend John Wemyss of Logie to quietly break into the house. When Logie discovered that she was still inside, he signalled to his accomplices including Sir James Sandilands to break down the doors and carry her back to Gray, while Lord Home and his followers prevented any would-be rescuers intervening. Catherine eventually married Sir John Hamilton of Lettrick.

The house was apparently the scene of a rope trick on 10 July 1598, when an acrobat performed on a cable between the fore-stair of the house and the steeple of St Giles.
