= Matthew Hamilton of Milnburn =

Matthew Hamilton of Milnburn and Binning (died 1564) was a Scottish landowner and courtier.

== Early life ==
He was a son of Matthew Hamilton in Milnburn or Mylnburn or Milburne in Dalserf. The Mill Burn flows into the River Clyde north of the village.

== Career ==
Matthew Hamilton was appointed a gentleman and squire in the king's household in 1529.

In February 1542 James V of Scotland sent Robert Hamilton of Briggis and Matthew Hamilton of Milnburn to France. They were allowed to return by Regent Arran in January 1543.

He was a Master of Household to James Hamilton, Regent Arran, and Captain of Blackness Castle. In 1545 he was paid for "furnishing" the Regent's house (with food), and paying household fees. John Knox identifies Matthew Hamilton as an opponent of the Scottish Reformation in 1559, and his brother Master John Hamilton as an unlearned cleric.

=== John Hamilton of Milnburn ===
Master John Hamilton of Milnburn transported some of Regent Arran's silverware to Aberdour Castle in 1543 when it served as a pledge for a loan. He was Master of Works to Mary, Queen of Scots in 1547, and sent as ambassador to France. According to John Knox he fell and died at Dumbarton Castle on his return. In 1543 John Hamilton was paid in connection with attempt of Arran to divorce his wife, Margaret Douglas, Countess of Arran. John Hamilton began building a rampart and blockhouse at Edinburgh Castle in February 1547. This work was completed as the spur fortification by an Italian military engineer, Migliorino Ubaldini.

== Personal life ==
The children of Matthew Hamilton and his wife Agnes Livingstone included:

- Henry Hamilton, who died before his father.

His daughter or step-daughter may have been a daughter of Agnes Livingston by her first marriage;

- Libra Hamilton alias Robertson, who married firstly, Andrew Home of Prendergast, in Ayton. After his death she had the mills of Eyemouth and Coldingham in life-rent, and married William Home of Ayton. Libra Hamilton, Lady Ayton, was one of the women invited to wait on Anne of Denmark at her coronation in May 1590. In 1600 Anne of Denmark's tailor Peter Sanderson went to law over her debt of £54 for workmanship and merchandise supplied to her and her daughters and servants. Another contemporary called Libra Hamilton, (died 1592), was the wife of John Hamilton of Barncluith.

Matthew Hamilton, who had continued to serve James Hamilton, the former Regent Arran, returned his papers in November 1564. Following Matthew Hamilton's death in December 1564, Hamilton's estate passed to his brother, Robert Hamilton, in 1569.
