= John Anderson (tailor) =

16th-century Scottish tailor

John Anderson was a Scottish tailor working in Edinburgh in the 1540s and 1550s. He made clothes for Margaret Douglas, Countess of Arran and her daughters. At this time, the James Hamilton, Earl of Arran was Regent or Governor of Scotland, and the treasurer's accounts include details of clothing bought for his family.

Occasionally, Anderson travelled to Hamilton and Linlithgow for fittings and to complete garments for "My Lady Governor". Margaret, Countess of Hamilton had riding cloaks and "wardygards", a Scots language word for a "safeguard" riding skirt. Some of her garments were trimmed with fur supplied by John Craig. An embroiderer, John Cochran, carried out specialised work on cutting out satin sleeves and skirts.

An entry for tailoring work in February 1553 reads:

Item to Jhone Andersoun tailyeour for making of this foresaid clethying viz tua gownnis of sating, ane goun of velvote, with paitlattis, hudis, skyrttis, slevis, gorgettis, furnessing of glaspis, & other necessars _ xxx s.

Item, to John Anderson tailor for making of this foresaid clothing viz: two gowns of satin, a gown of velvet, with partlets, hoods, skirts, sleeves, gorgets, furnishing of clasps, & other necessities _ 30 shillings.
