= Alexander Miller (tailor) =

Alexander Miller or Millar (1559-1616) was an Edinburgh tailor who served James VI and I.

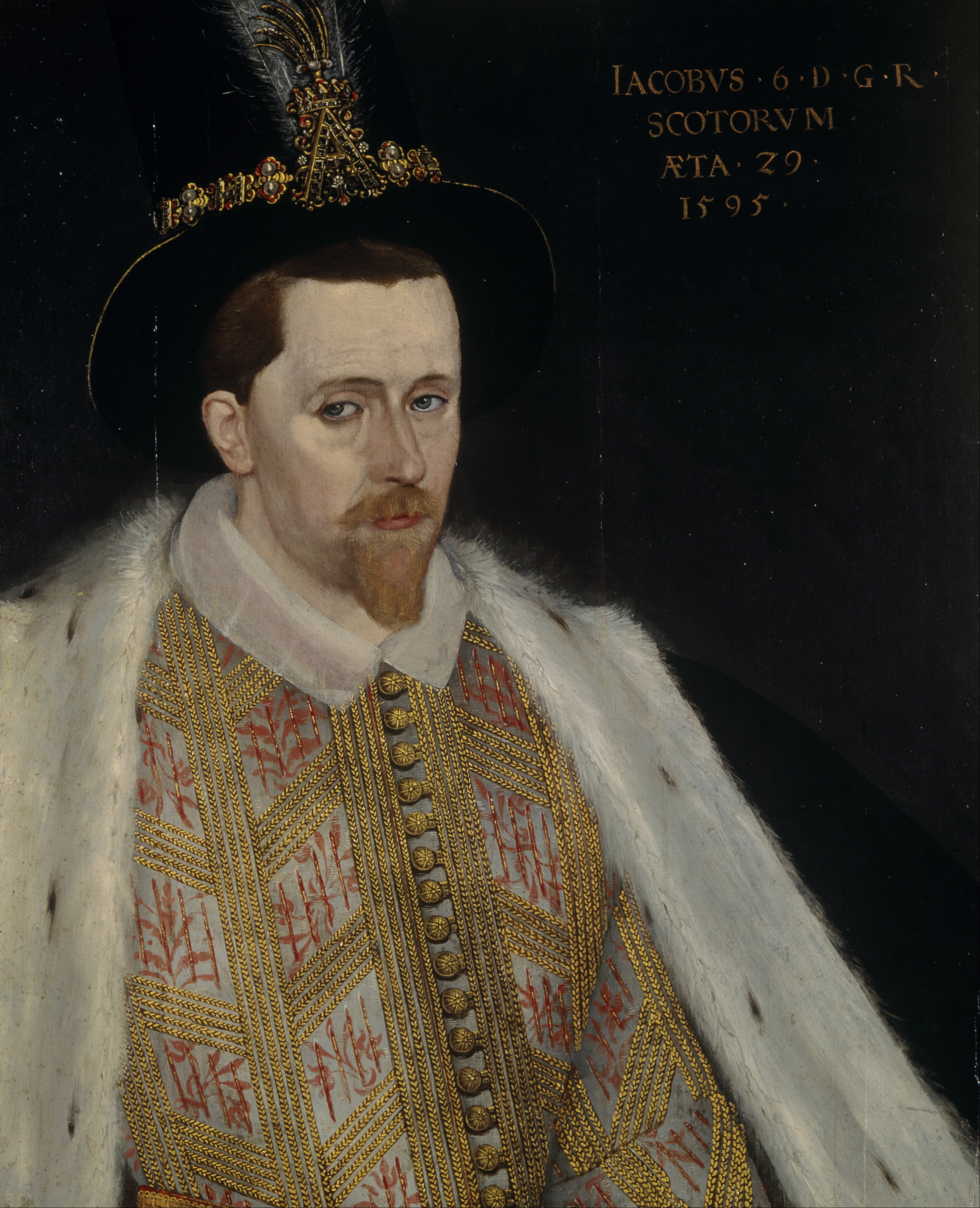
James VI, dressed by Alexander Miller, painted by Adrian Vanson

== Career ==
In 1584, James VI wrote to the Edinburgh incorporation of tailors, asking them to admit Miller as a free craftsmen, "gratis", with no costs. Miller had not been an apprentice in Edinburgh and must have learnt his trade elsewhere. Miller became a burgess of Edinburgh, and Deacon of the Tailors, who convened in their hall on the Cowgate, now a public house called the "Three Sisters". He bought land at Long Herdmanston and Currie.

When James VI returned from Denmark in May 1590, Miller was immediately set to work, starting with a cloak to wear at the coronation of Anne of Denmark:

Item the said day deliverit to Allexander Millar sevin ellis of clayth of silver of doubill threid groundit upon incarnadine to lyn his majestie cloik of reid cramosie velvot embroiderit with gold and silver and to drawe out the hois allso embroiderit with gold and silver att xxv li the ell _ £185.

Other tailors at the Scottish court included Peter Sanderson, who made clothes for Anne of Denmark and her children. Miller also made clothes for the pages of the King and Queen. With another tailor, James Inglis, he made a costume for an African servant at court in October 1590, who is known only as the "Moor", including an orange velvet "jupe" and breeches and a doublet of shot-silk Spanish taffeta festooned with white satin passementerie.

On 18 June 1591 the king ordered masque costumes from Miller. James VI and his valet, probably John Wemyss of Logie, performed in a masque at Tullibardine. The occasion was the wedding of Lilias Murray and John Grant of Freuchie. The costumes involved red and pink taffeta, dressed with gold tock or gauze, with buckram head-pieces and Venetian masks.

Costumes for James VI to wear at the baptism of Prince Henry in 1594 included a suit of violet satin and cloth of gold, with a violet velvet cloak. Miller made clothes for Prince Charles in November 1601, which were packed in buckram and sent to Dunfermline Palace.

=== Union of the Crowns ===
Miller made clothes for King James to wear in April 1603 when he travelled to London at the Union of the Crowns, including a green outfit for hunting lined with green Spanish taffeta. Miller came with the King to England, and made doublets and pairs of satin and velvet hose. He lived for a time in Bread Street ward. He made robes of the Order of the Garter for King James and Prince Henry.

In August 1604, King James indicated that Robert Jousie and Alexander Miller were owed money by the Master of Gray, a former Master of the Scottish royal wardrobe for an old debt from the 1580s. Gray sent his receipts to Lord Cecil to show that he did not owe any money.

Miller was given permission by Edinburgh council to build a house on common ground in the Wester Mure in 1610. In 1611 he brought legal action against James, Lord Torthorwald for bad debt.

== Death and legacy ==
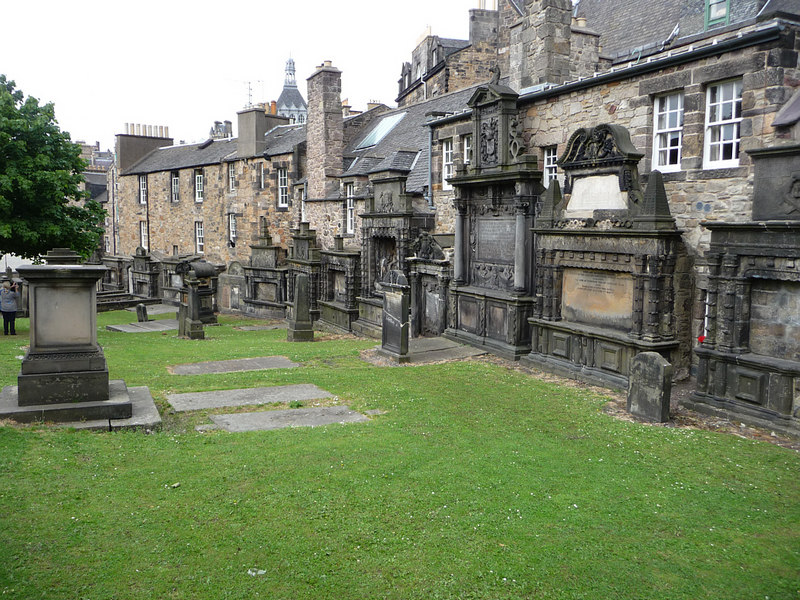
Alexander Miller's monument at Greyfriars Kirkyard may survive, reused for Robert Purves.

Alexander Miller died on 2 May 1616 and was buried in Greyfriars Kirkyard in Edinburgh. His monument was demolished or moved in the nineteenth century. The Latin inscription was recorded and translated by the historian William Maitland. It has been suggested that a monument in the churchyard, later reused to commemorate Robert Purves was Miller's.

His wife Jonet Huntar died on 29 April 1592. His family included two daughters, Barbara, and Sara Miller, wife of Thomas Fleming of Longhermiston. Alexander Miller left £1000 Scots to the town which contributed to the fund for rebuilding Greyfriar's Kirk. In 1637 a royal warrant was issued to pay Sara Miller £900 Sterling for unpaid work by her father.

The Heriot's Hospital foundation bought land in Broughton from Miller and Fleming in 1626. In 1642 she contracted to give various sums of money to the lawyer William Purves who was marrying her daughter Marjory Fleming. This included another debt, of 5000 merks owed to her father, for a loan in 1610 made to the courtier Sir James Sandilands.
