= Jupe (clothing) =

Loose-fitting wool jacket or tunic

A jupe referred to a loose-fitting wool jacket or tunic for men. It was later restricted to an item of women's and children's clothing.

The term has now disappeared but was used up until the 19th century. Usage of this meaning of jupe for menswear became restricted to "jupe panels" in jackets. (In French the word jupe means "skirt.")

== Historic use ==
In Elizabethan England, the "jupe" was regarded as a French-style clothing item, and some accounts of the wardrobe of Elizabeth I mention a "jupe or Gascon coat". The jupe was apparently a riding garment and was worn by women with a "safeguard" skirt.

In October 1564, a jupe was made for Mary, Queen of Scots with bodice and sleeves (avec le corps et manche). Some accounts of her execution, relate that she wore a red bodice or "pair of sleeves", described in French as "une juppe de velloux cramoisy brun". A similar item is included in the 1586 inventory of her clothes.

At the Scottish court four male pages and an African servant of Anne of Denmark were supplied with orange jupes in October 1590. In the 1590s, an Edinburgh tailor Patrick Nimmo supplied outfits comprising doublets, jupes, and breeches to clients including John Hamilton of Lettrick, Robert Jousie, Thomas McClellan of Barneicht, and Peter Kennoquhuy.

== See also ==
- The dictionary definition of jupe at Wiktionary
- Harem pants, or jupe-culotte, jupe-sultane and jupe-pantalon
