= Safeguard (costume) =

Riding garment or overskirt worn by women

A safeguard or saveguard was a riding garment or overskirt worn by women in the sixteenth and seventeenth centuries. Some safeguards were intended to protect skirts or kirtles worn beneath. Mary Frith, dramatised as the character Moll Cutpurse in The Roaring Girl, wore a black safeguard over breeches. The safeguard, and its French equivalent, the devantiére, can be described as a wrap-around apron, possibly worn over some kind of breeches.

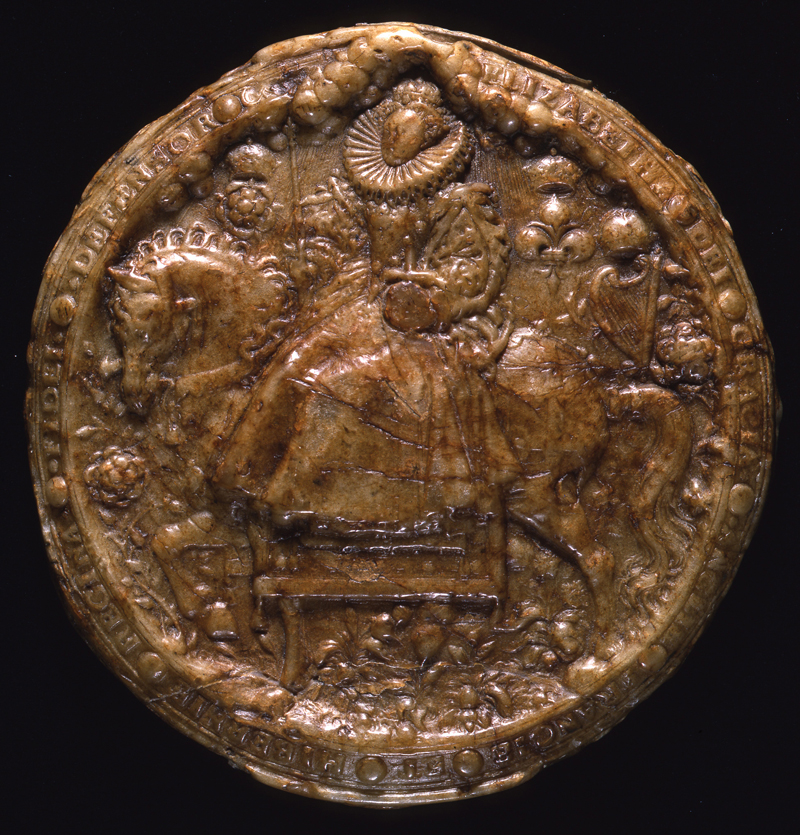
The Great Seal of Elizabeth I, designed by Nicholas Hilliard shows her riding sidesaddle with voluminous skirts

== History ==
One of the earliest mentions of a safeguard is in a list of purchases made around 1546, when lace and fringes were bought "for my Mistress's gown, cloak, and safeguard". In 1555, a cloak and a safeguard of broadcloth were made for Thomasine Petre, an English gentry woman, the youngest daughter of William Petre, in anticipation of travel from London to Hampshire to join the household of the Marchioness of Exeter. She ordered similar garments in 1559. Margaret and Mary Kitson were bought "savegardes" of peach coloured cloth in February 1573. Mary, as Countess Rivers, made bequests of clothing in 1641 including "my best cloak and safeguard laid with gold buttons" and an "old safegard laid with gold lace".

Safeguards made for Elizabeth I seem to have been tied to the stirrup or foot. Some safeguards had pockets. In 1574, Elizabeth's tailor, Walter Fyshe worked on a safeguard of French "ashe colour Abramamasio" fabric, with laces of Venice gold, silver and silk, and added "newe pockettes" of green taffeta. During a tournament and entertainment at New Hall in September 1579, the Earl of Sussex gave Elizabeth a horse, a cloak, and a safeguard "to keep her from evil weather that might hap" in the next day's hunting. Some records of Elizabeth's wardrobe describe "safeguard or kirtles", and the tailor William Jones made a gown and "sauffegard or kirtell" for the "woman dwarf" (perhaps Thomazina Muliercula) in February 1584.

Elizabeth's inventory of clothing includes safeguards matched in sets or ensembles with cloaks, and with jupes, and sets of matching cloaks, jupes, and safeguards. As a New Year's Day gift for 1589, Francis Walsingham gave Elizabeth a doublet with a cloak and a safeguard of "fair coloured velvet" lined with white sarsenet, and a Mistress Dale gave a safeguard of russet satin, with buttons and loops of Venice gold and silver at the front. Bess of Hardwick gave a safeguard and a jupe of satin patterned with golden flames. A favourite safeguard and jupe embroidered with stars of Venice silver and gold wheat ears was repaired twice, and washed and mended by the queen's silkwoman Dorothy Speckard.

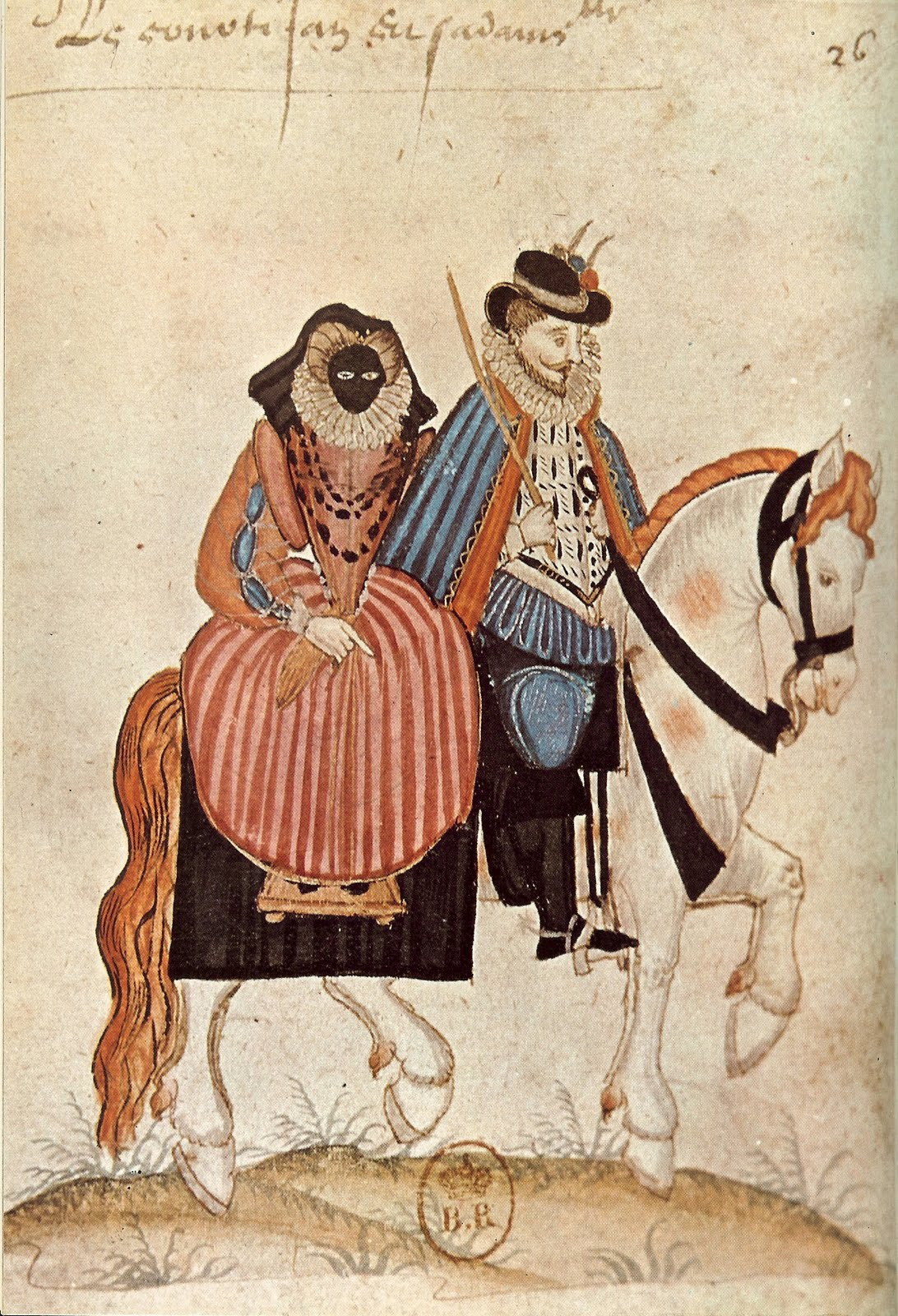
A 16th-century French drawing shows a woman riding sidesaddle and wearing a mask or vizard

Godfrey Goodman doubted that Elizabeth I rode very often by 1597, when discussing a plot involving a clerk in the royal stable Edward Squire to poison her. Squire is said to have confessed to sprinkling poison on her saddle without effect.

In July 1590, Paul Rey, a Danish tailor working in Scotland for Anne of Denmark, made her a set of riding clothes, including a cloak and "rydding saifgard" of 15 ells of Spanish incarnadine coloured satin lined with taffeta of the same colour, and trimmed with silk ribbons and gold passementerie. Another safeguard was made for her in October 1594 of fine tanny London cloth with strings of orange Florence ribbon. Orange ribbon was supplied for riding clothes of London brown in October 1597.

Anne of Denmark's wardrobe inventory of 1608 lists eight "saveguards", four made with white, grass-green, orange, and straw coloured satin, trimmed with silver and gold lace, and three party-coloured safeguards, one of crimson and white damask, another of deer colour and white camlet, and one of willow colour and white damask. Another had a ground of silver camlet tufted with orange silk "of small tuft", lined with sarsenet. This safeguard had gold and silver seams with long buttons and loops woven of silver and gold thread.

Lady Anne Clifford bought more practical and hardwearing riding garments when she stayed at Brougham Castle in Westmorland in November 1616, a "cloak and a safeguard of cloth laced with black lace to keep me warm on my journey" to London. Safeguards of cloth (broadcloth) are listed in many inventories of costume. In 1586, Margaret Grey and Mary Grey, daughters of a Newcastle miller, owned broadcloth safeguards listed with their petticoats. In 1596, Elizabeth Woode of Ramsey left a russet petticoat and a russet safeguard to her daughter. Bequests made by Anne Bikarstaffe of Stockport in 1599 include a "partelytt and savegard". Dame Honor Proctor of Cowling Hall near Bedale made a bequest of her "ryding savegard and cloak, hoodd and mittons" in 1625.

When Arbella Stuart tried to leave England in disguise, the black hat and riding safeguard worn by one of her companions reminded a witness, John Bright, of Moll Cutpurse. This was a probably a reference to the play The Roaring Girl. In the play, a speech makes reference to the safeguard, an item of female clothing, transformed into a slop, a word for male breeches.

In 1613, Princess Elizabeth was provided with safeguards of green and murrey satin, with sleeves of rich tissue in Spanish fashion. They were made by her tailor, John Spens or Spence. Henrietta Maria brought five safeguards or devantières to England in 1625. These richly embroidered garments, like those of Princess Elizabeth, were listed with their sleeves and stomachers.

== Safeguard and wardegard ==
A number of safeguards seem to have been provided by a tailor John Anderson for the family of Regent Arran in Scotland in the 1540s and 1550s. Described in the Scots language as wardegardes, a word sometimes interpreted as a carrying bag for clothes, these may have been practical riding garments of hard-wearing buckram, fustian, and gray wool. A piece of leather was used in their construction. The French equivalent word for safeguard seems to have been devantiére.

An inventory of the clothes of Mary, Queen of Scots, includes a vardingard of black taffeta with a satin foreskirt embroidered with gold passementerie, another of black taffeta, and a third of buckram. Possibly a source of confusion, the same inventory uses the word vardingaill for farthingale, a support undergarment to volumize a skirt. One of her French inventories includes a black taffeta verdugall which likely indicates a farthingale. A satirical poem describing women's riding garments in the Maitland Quarto using the form fartigard may mean a safeguard.

The word "safeguard" for the women's riding garment, as in England, appears in a number of Scottish 16th- and 17th-century wills.
