= Søren Johnson =

Danish courtier in Scotland

Søren Johnson was a Danish courtier in Scotland, serving Anne of Denmark, queen consort of James VI and I as master of the wardrobe.

== Career ==
Johnson probably came to Scotland with Anne of Denmark in May 1590. He is mentioned in a number of court records, until 1597 when he left or died. He was in charge of the queen's clothes. The spelling of his name in the Scottish record varies. His wardrobe staff included a Danish master tailor, Paul Rey or Pål Rei, three servant tailors, and a furrier Henrie Koss.

Records survive of clothes made for Anne of Denmark, her ladies in waiting, chamberers, her minister Hans Sering, and her secretaries. At least one of Anne's gowns was made in the Danish fashion, recorded in Scots as "ane goun of Dence fassoun". The details of this Danish fashion are now difficult to determine.

The Scottish tailors Peter Sanderson, William Simpson, and Peter Rannald also worked on the queen's clothes.

A record of fabrics supplied for Anne of Denmark includes an outfit of black clothes for "Sorne Janesone". The cloak, doublet, and breeches are comparable with costume given to her secretaries and her master cook Hans Poppilman. Her wardrobe had some independence from the wardrobe of King James, and was funded by money diverted from an English subsidy. James also gave livery allowances of clothes or money equivalents to some members of the household, "according to the custom of Denmark".

The costume record includes costume made for Anne of Denmark to wear for dancing at masques. Masque costumes were also made for James VI, and it seems that the royal couple danced or performed in costume at the weddings of courtiers and aristocrats in the first years of their marriage.
