= Passementerie =

Elaborate braids and other trimmings

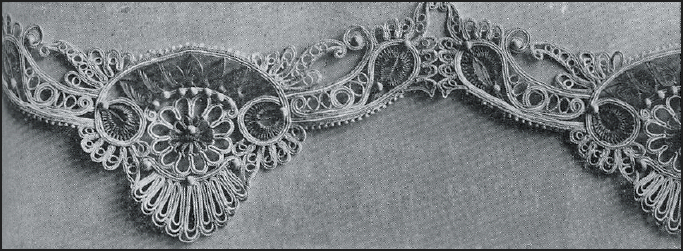
Passementerie of cording and braid, embellished with beads, French, 1908

Passementerie (/pæsˈmɛntri/, French pronunciation: [pɑsmɑ̃tʁi]) or passementarie is the art of making elaborate trimmings or edgings (in French, passements) of applied braid, gold or silver cord, embroidery, colored silk, or beads for clothing or furnishings.

Styles of passementerie include the tassel, fringes (applied, as opposed to integral), ornamental cords, galloons, pompons, rosettes, and gimps, as well as other forms. Tassels, pompons, and rosettes are point ornaments, and the others are linear ornaments.

== Overview ==
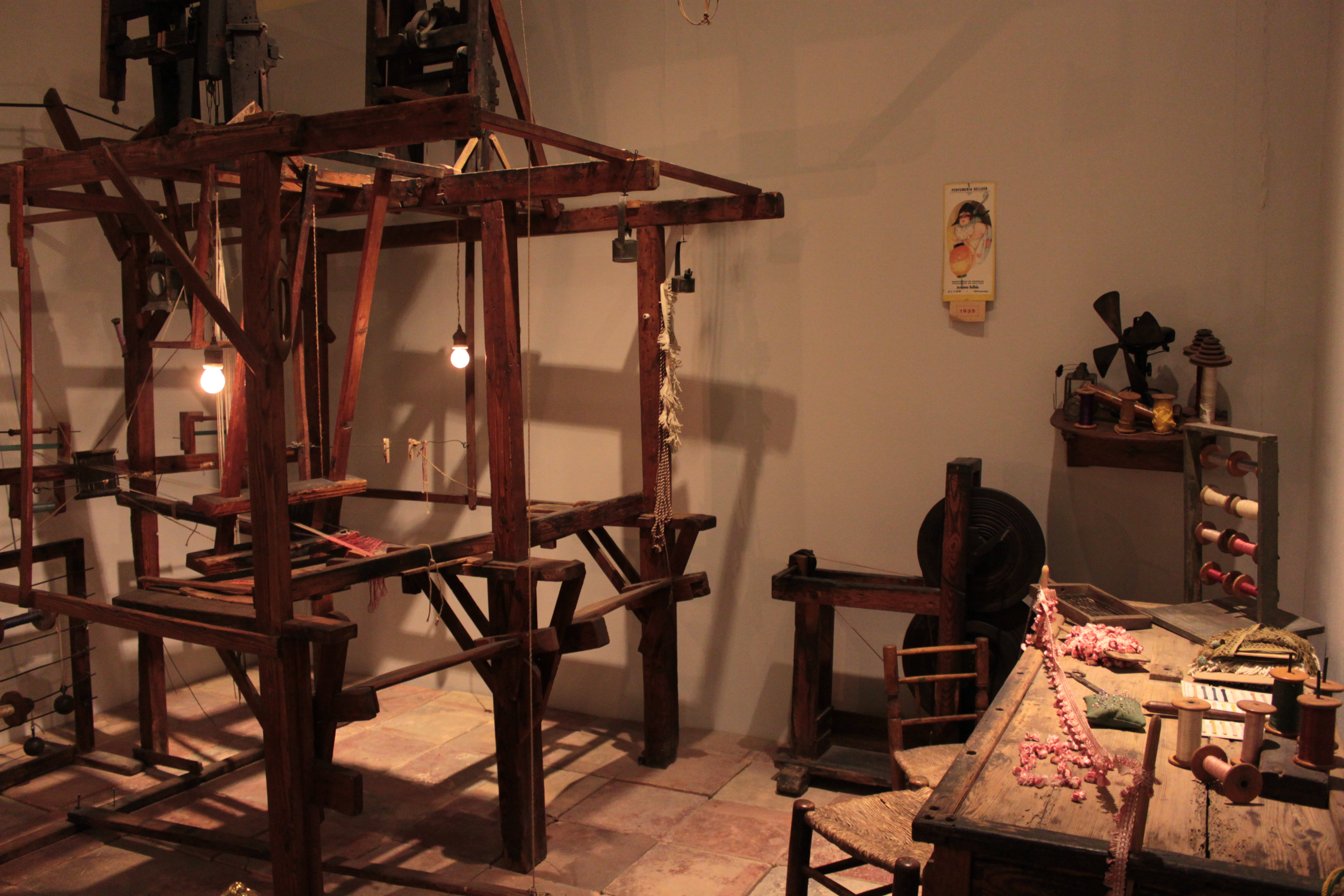
Passementerie workshop, Valencian Museum of Ethnology

Passementerie worked in white linen thread is the origin of bobbin lace, and passement is an early French word for lace.

Today, passementerie is used with clothing, such as the gold braid on military dress uniforms, and for decorating couture clothing and wedding gowns. It is also used in furniture trimming, such as in the Centripetal Spring Armchair of 1849 and in some lampshades, draperies, fringes, and tassels.

== History ==
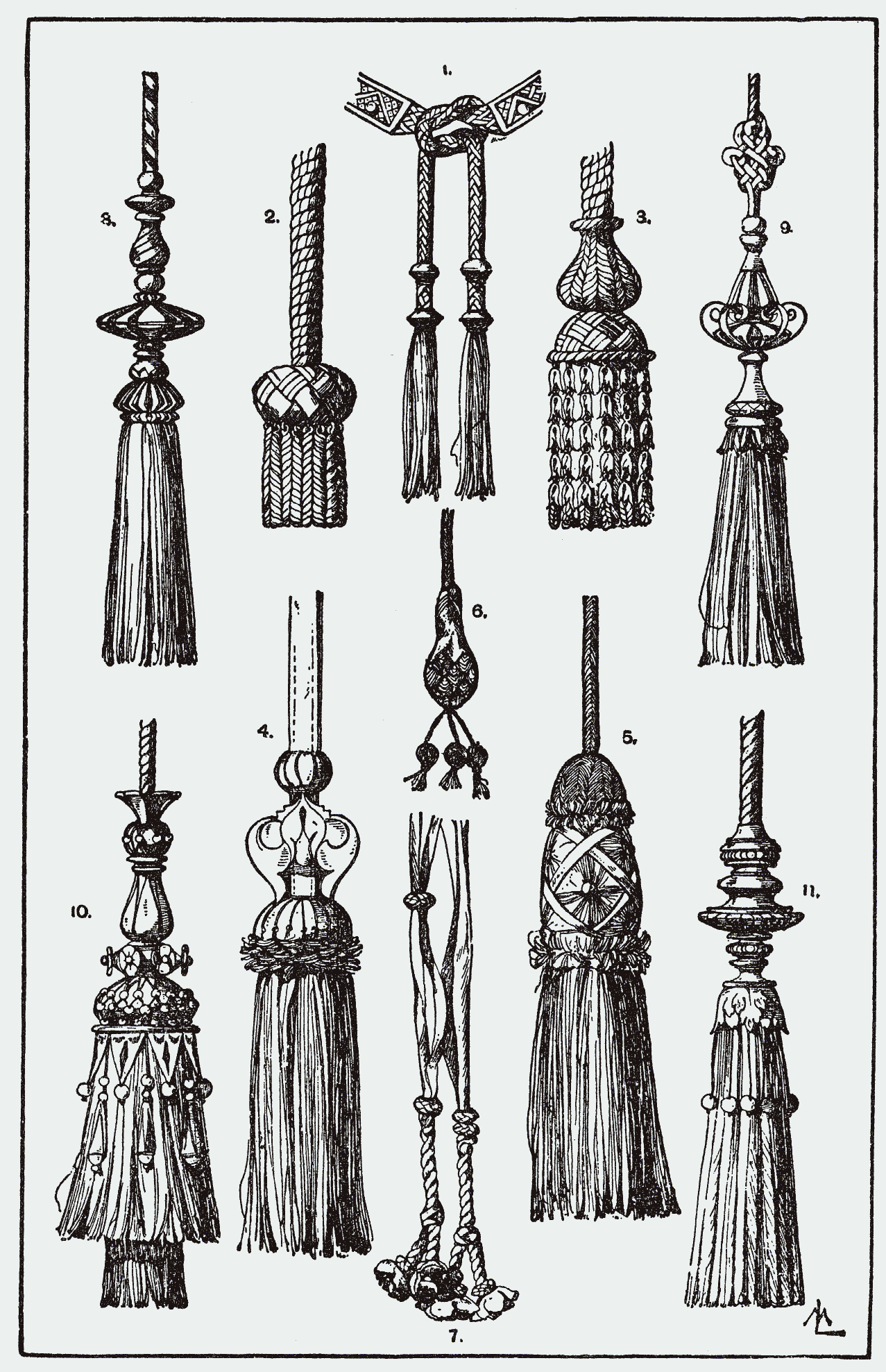

In the West, tassels were originally a series of windings of thread or string around a suspending string until the desired curvature was attained. Decades later, turned wooden moulds, which were either covered in simple wrappings or much more elaborate coverings called "satinings", were used. This involved an intricate binding of bands of filament silk vertically around the mould by means of an internal "lacing" in the bore of the mould. A tassel is primarily an ornament, and was at first the casual termination of a cord to prevent unraveling with a knot. As time went on, various peoples developed variations on this.

In the 16th century, the Guild of Passementiers was created in France. In France practitioners of the art were called "passementiers", and an apprenticeship of seven years was required to become a master in one of the subdivisions of the guild.

The Guild documented the art of passementerie. The tassel was its primary expression, but it also included fringes (applied, as opposed to integral), ornamental cords, galloons, pompons, rosettes, and gimps as well as others. Tassels, pompons, and rosettes are point ornaments; the others are linear ornaments. These constructions were varied and augmented with extensive ornamentations. These constructions were each assigned an idiosyncratic term by their French practitioners.

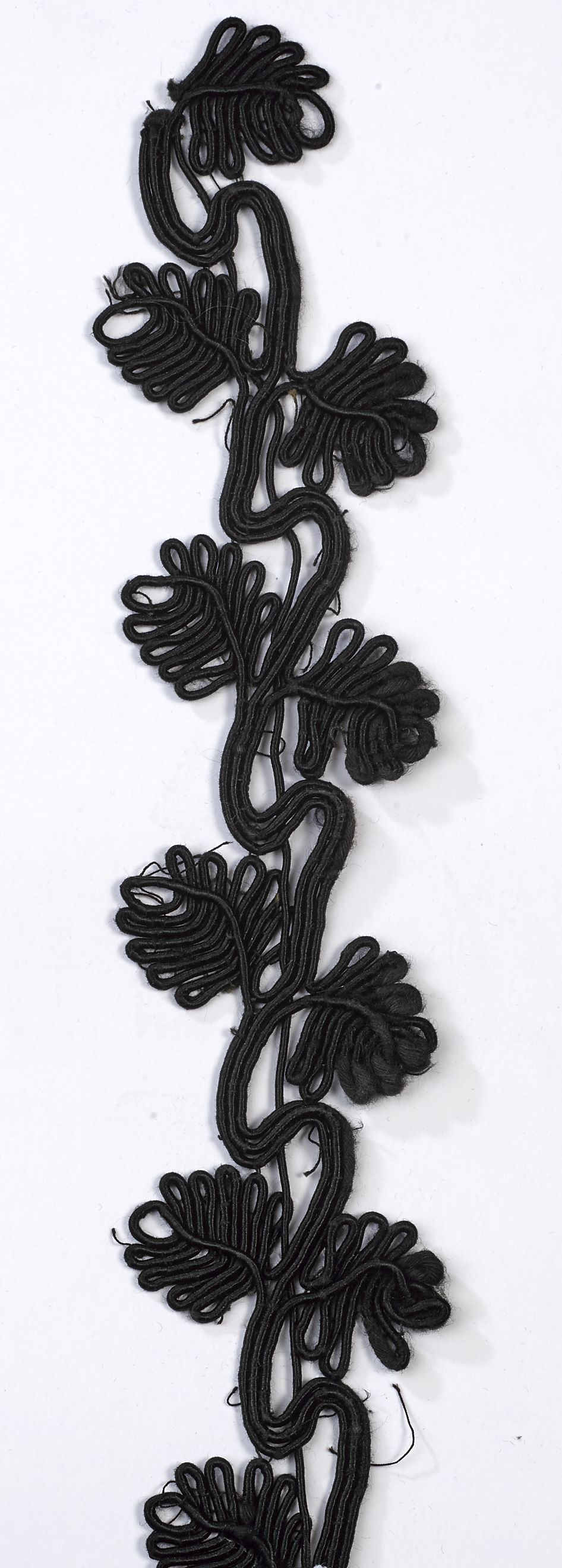
Border (ST168) - Passementerie - MoMu Antwerp

The French widely exported their very artistic work, and at such low prices that no other nation developed a mature "trimmings" industry. Tassels and their associated forms changed style throughout the years, from the small and casual of Renaissance designs, through the medium sizes and more staid designs of the Empire period, and to the Victorian Era with the largest and most elaborate.

An English Book of Rates from 1582 lists six varieties of "passemin lace" available to upholsterers and clothiers; of crewel, of gold and silver, of silk, of silk and thread, of thread called "Cantlet", and "pomet lace". In Scotland at the end of the 16th century some passementerie was made with inferior gold and silver thread which quickly tarnished. On 6 May 1593 the Duke of Lennox and his friends decided not to wear any passementerie for a year, especially "passements great or small, plain or 'a jour', bissets, lilykins, cordons, and fringes". In England, specialist merchants known as "silkmen" supplied passementerie, including Benjamin Henshawe who provided a variety of lace and tassels for clothing and interior decoration to Anne of Denmark and Henrietta Maria.

Passementerie with clothing was for a long time reserved for the elites as a sign of social distinction among royalty, aristocracy, religious, and military. Since the 18th century, the use became largely obsolete with the simplification of clothing.

Periodically, historic designs return to favour with interior and fashion designers. The middle of the 20th century saw a marked decline in the production and range of these products. The latter part of the 20th century has seen a resurgence in interest partly led by the film industry's set designers and costumiers. European and American artisans specialising in hand-made products are increasing in number.

== Gallery ==
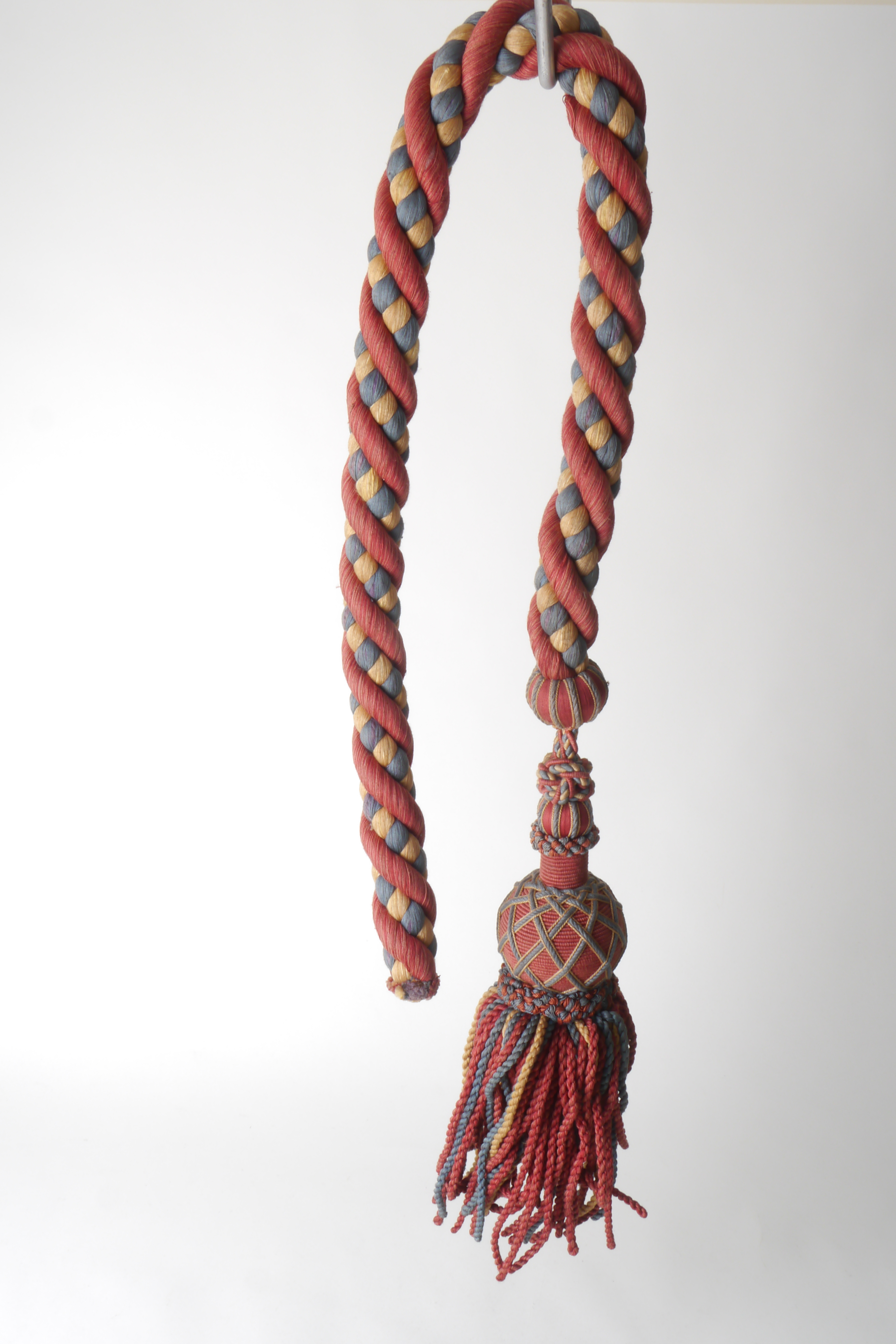
Cordelière passement - Museum of Industry Ghent

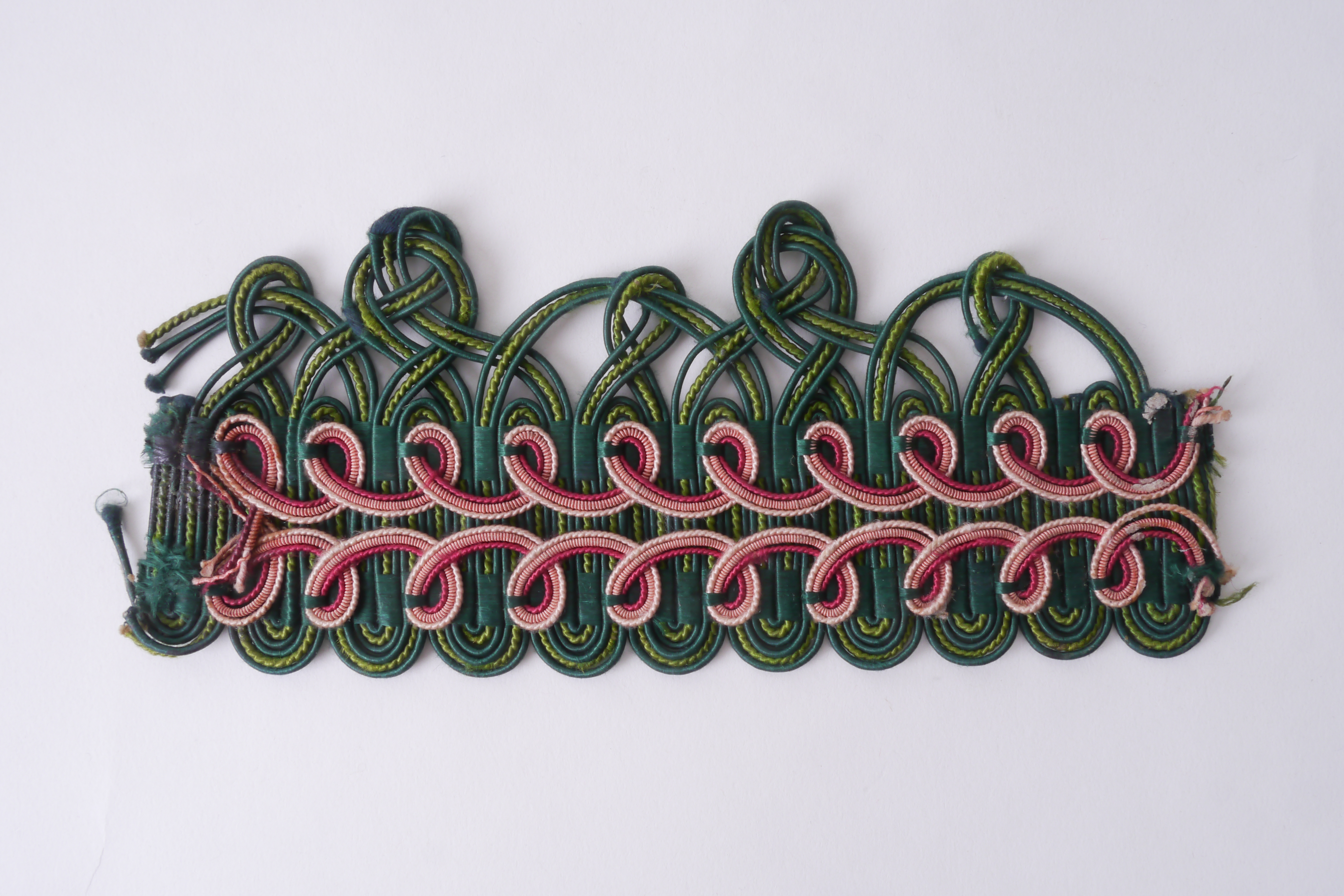
Crête passement - Museum of Industry Ghent

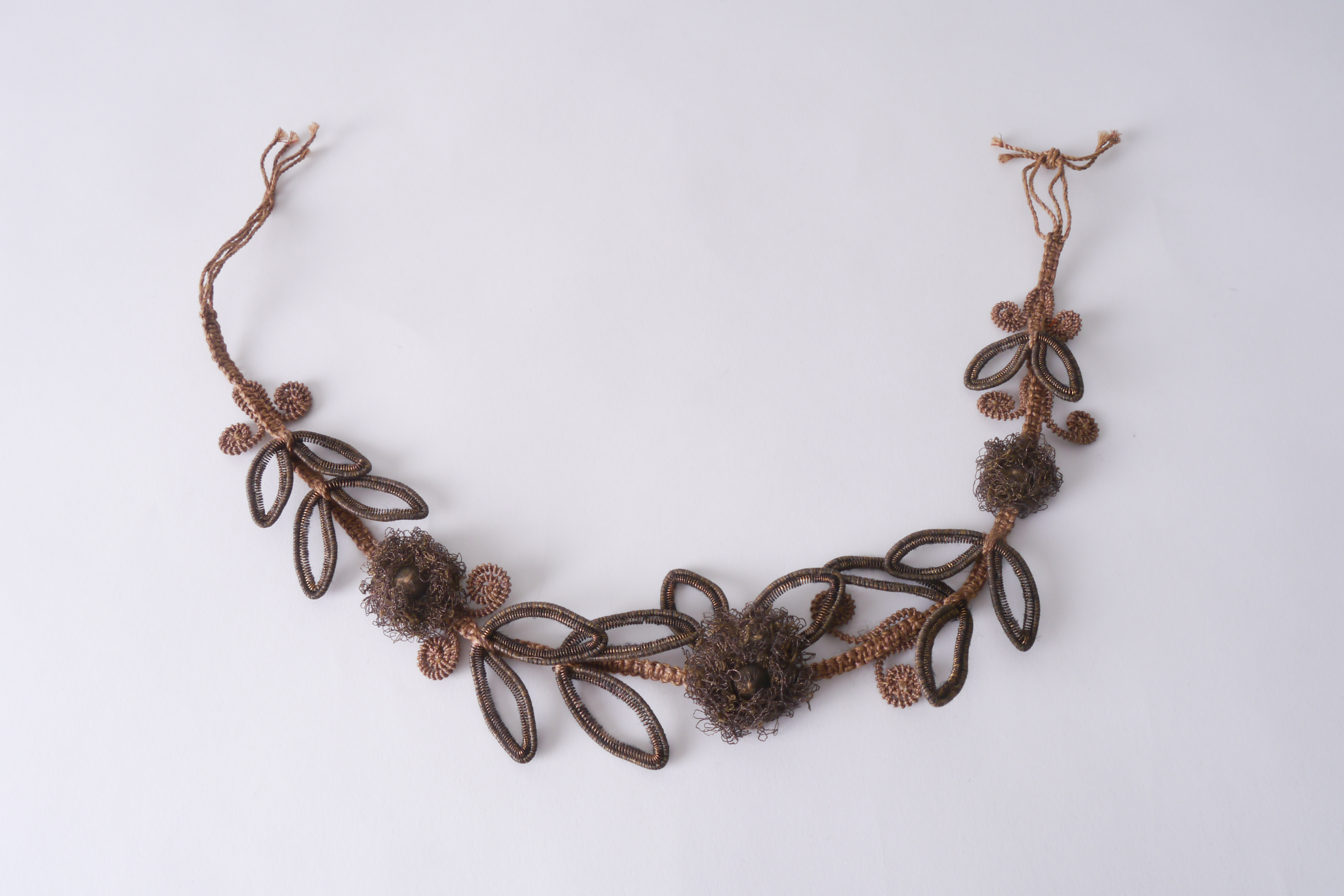
Guirlande passement - Museum of Industry Ghent

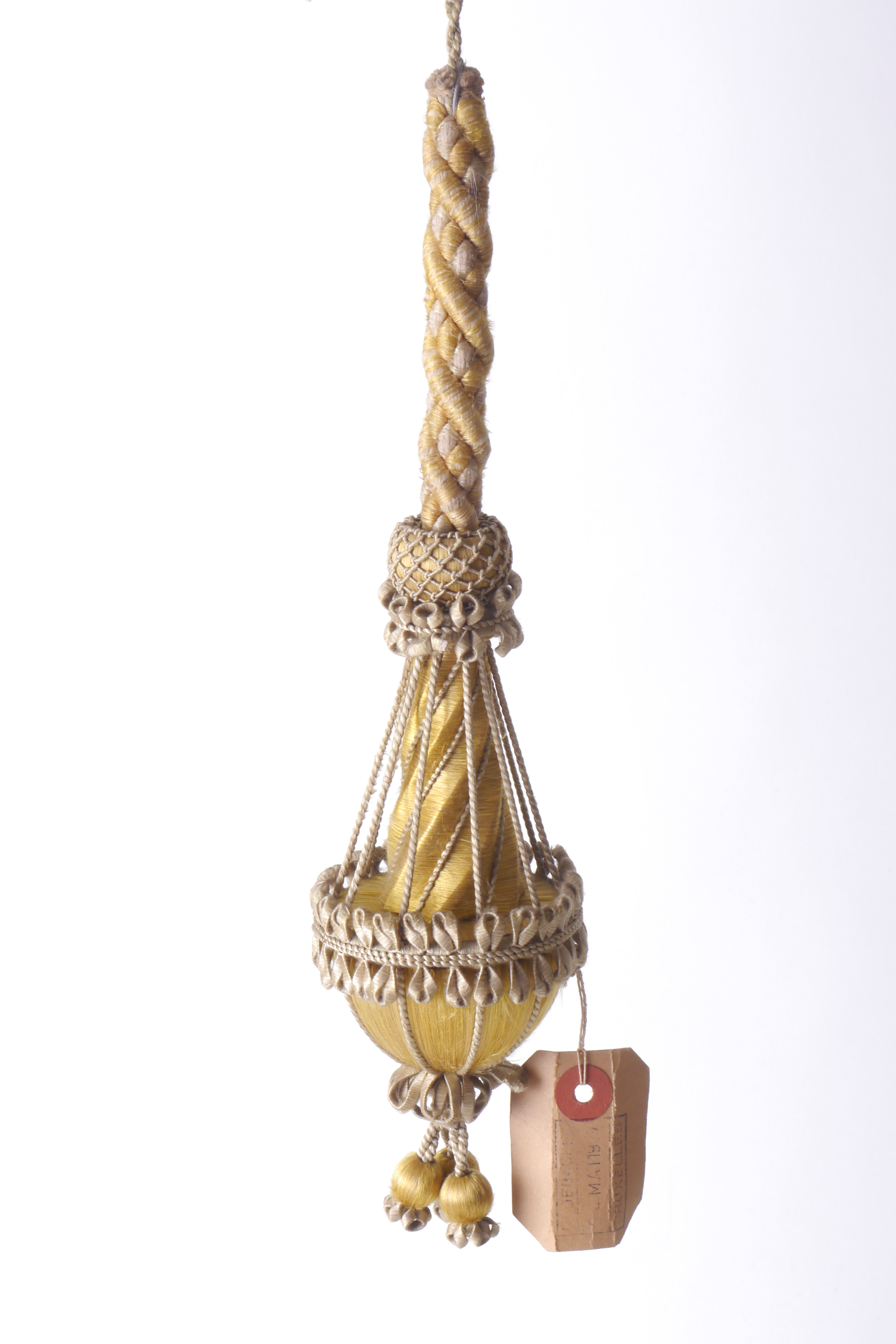
Tassel passement - Museum of Industry Ghent

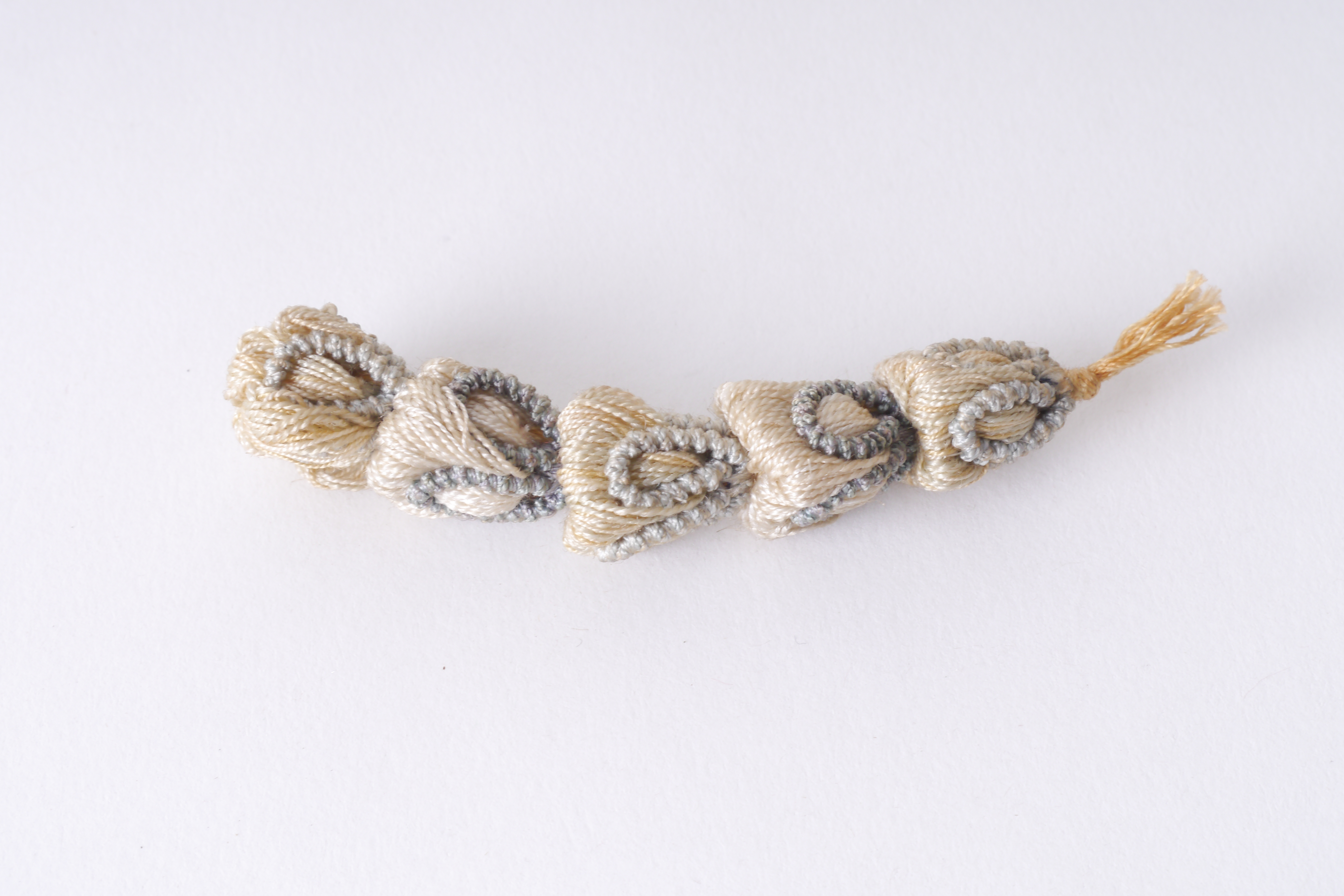
Jasmine passement - Museum of Industry Ghent
