= Hans Poppilman =

Danish cook

Hans Poppilman (born c. 1574) was a Danish cook who served Anne of Denmark in Scotland and England.

== Career ==
He came to Scotland with Anne of Denmark, bride of James VI, in May 1590. He was then aged around 16, working for Hans Drier, and progressed in her service to become her Master Cook.

Anne of Denmark also had a female Danish cook called Marion in her service in her first years in Scotland. She was a bedchamber servant. Anne of Denmark gave her a gift of relatively simple clothes made of black taffeta and London cloth, a costume given to the other serving women or "damsels" of her chamber. Nothing else has been discovered about Marion. Cuisine from the country of origin provided continuity of diet and a cultural bridge for queens consort in the early modern period.

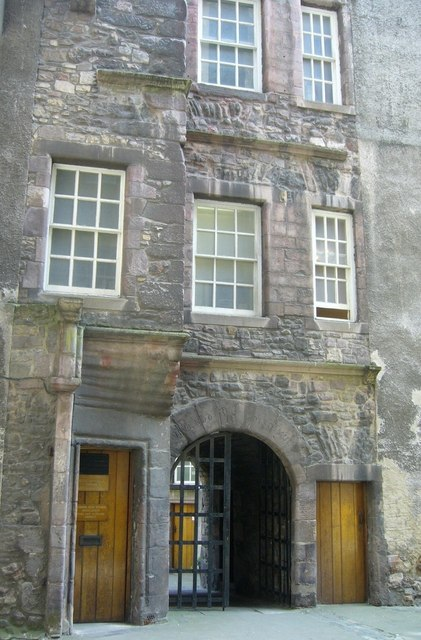
Hans Poppilman was chef at a banquet held at Riddle's Court on Edinburgh's Lawnmarket on 2 May 1598

Lists of the Scottish household mention five salaried positions in the queen's kitchen; the Master Cook, the foreman or Master Cook's servant, and three or four servant cooks, with the "turnebroches" whose main or notional duty was to turn the spit. There would have been many other workers. Detailed records of the food bought for the queen's household in 1598 survive in the National Records of Scotland, including extra purchases and sweetmeats for the wedding feast of her chaplain Johannes Sering held at Holyrood Palace.

James VI asked Chancellor Maitland to resolve issues over pay in the royal households in April 1591 after some of the queen's kitchen staff deserted their posts. They said their conditions or terms of employment were not met, and would not make the supper ready. The master cook and his boy (probably Hans Drier and Poppilman) had to do the job of the absent kitchen aids and dress the food for the table. James VI reminded Maitland of promises he had made to Anne of Denmark's mother, Sophie of Mecklenburg-Güstrow, writing in connection with personal honour and promised livery payments, "Suppose we be not wealthy, let us be proud poor bodies".

At first, as foreman cook, Poppilman's allowance of livery clothes was £40 Scots, the value of two common garments "according to the custom of Denmark", to be paid by the treasurer. At the end of 1591, Hans Drier, recorded as "John Freis", received £200 Scots in cash as equivalent for livery for himself and his two "childer" or "boys", the servant cooks. At this time the expenses of the royal households and food consumption were scrutinised for savings. Wages in other years, and for Poppilman, do not seem to have been individually recorded. Payment of the Danish liveries could be made in clothes or cash alternatives. When Poppilman was promoted, Anne of Denmark bought clothes as a gift for him, including a cloak made of black London cloth, trimmed with Spanish taffeta, and a fustian doublet.

The city of Edinburgh held a banquet for Anne of Denmark's brother, the Duke of Holstein at Riddle's Court on 2 May 1598. There was both "great solemnity and merryness". Poppilman was paid £10 Scots. The kitchen fireplace was recently rediscovered and can be seen as a cloakroom. The banquet involved sugar confections and sweetmeats made by a Flemish confectioner, Jacques de Bousie, who was a favourite of the queen. He was paid £184 Scots for sugar works, one of the most costly items on the bill. The wine was sweetened and spiced to make Hippocras by two apothecaries, John Lawtie and John Clavie, and a third apothecary, Alexander Barclay, made two pints of "vergeis" and a mutchkin of perfumed rose water. Two French specialists, Estienne Piere and Robert Barbier, prepared the table linen and napkins. Edinburgh City Archives hold the account of the expenses of the banquet.

Poppilman came with Anne of Denmark to England at the Union of the Crowns in 1603. Hans Poppilman, one of the queen's French musicians Louis Richard, and a French servant, Arthur Bodren, were naturalised as denizens of England fifteen years later in July 1618. Bodren kept some household accounts. He was involved in the repair and refashioning of the queen's jewellery, and gave the architect Inigo Jones money for his work for the queen.

After Anne of Denmark's death in 1619, Poppilman sent a petition for payment to King James mentioning that he had started his career as a cook in the service of Anne's father, Frederick II of Denmark. He was married with children. The king's household paid his wages or fees, not the queen's. Poppilman, as the queen's master cook, was awarded an annuity of £50.
