= John Burrell (poet) =

Scottish poet

John Burrell or John Burel (fl. 1590) was a Scottish poet sometimes said to have been a goldsmith. In 1596 he dedicated his collection of poems to Ludovic Stewart, 2nd Duke of Lennox.

== Career ==
John Burrell, the goldsmith and officer of the royal mint, was regarded as a royal servant in 1587 and able to claim exemptions from taxes in Edinburgh. Edinburgh burgh council and the Provost John Arnot challenged exemptions claimed by the tailors James Inglis and John Murdo, the apothecary Alexander Barclay, the surgeon Gilbert Primrose, the clockmaker Robert Purves, and the goldsmiths Thomas Foulis and John Burrell. It is not however clear if this goldsmith was the published author, and two or three Edinburgh contemporaries shared the name "John Burrell". It has been suggested that a merchant John Burrell, married to Marjorie Mowbray, a sister of Francis Mowbray, was the poet.

John Burrell, the poet, was the author of a poetical description of the entry of Queen Anne (Anne of Denmark) into Edinburgh in 1590, titled The Discription of the Queenis Maiesties most honourable entry into the town of Edinburgh. According to Burel, performers with wearing black masks or visards and paint represented the "Moirs of the Inds". They had come to salute Scotland's new queen and offer e their "most willing minds" to her service:

Into the service of our Queene,
Thay offert thair maist willing mynds,
Thir ar the Moirs of quhom I mene,
Quha dois inhabit in the Ynds;
Leving thair land and dwelling place,
For to do honour to hir Grace.

These "Moirs" were described as people who lived in comparative ease and comfort by the golden mountain of "Synerdas".

Among the title-deeds of a small property at the foot of Todricks Wynd, Edinburgh, there was found a disposition of a house by John Burrel, goldsmith, yane of the printers in his majesties cunzie house (king's mint) in 1628. From the minuteness with which the poet describes the jewellery displayed on Queen Anne's entry, it appears that he had a special technical knowledge of such matters, and it has been suggested that the poet was the same person. The poem, along with another by the same author, titled The Passage of the Pilgrims, divided into four parts, was published in Watson's Collection of Scots Poems and the former is also included in Sir Robert Sibbald's Chronicle of Scottish Poetry. Neither of the poems possesses any literary merit.

His translation of a medieval verse drama Pamphilus based on works of Ovid seems to address the events of 1591, when the young courtier Ludovic Stewart, 2nd Duke of Lennox was advised to end his relationship with Lilias Ruthven.

Burrell may have been involved in the entertainment of the Duke of Holstein at Riddle's Court by the burgh of Edinburgh in 1598. The account for the banquet includes payments to the schoolmasters Johne Black and Robert Burrell, to William Douglas, and to "Johne Burrell", who received £3-6s-8d Scots.

In 1601 Francis Mowbray wrote to Sir Robert Cecil from Edinburgh complaining about John Burrell who was in London and had ridiculed him in verse and had a sonnet against him published. Mowbray enclosed a copy of the printed poem (which survives) and wanted the poet put in prison.
