= Jacques de Bousie =

Flemish confectioner

Jacques de Bousie (floruit 1580–1610) was a Flemish confectioner known as a "sugarman" working in Edinburgh, Scotland, employed by James VI and Anne of Denmark.

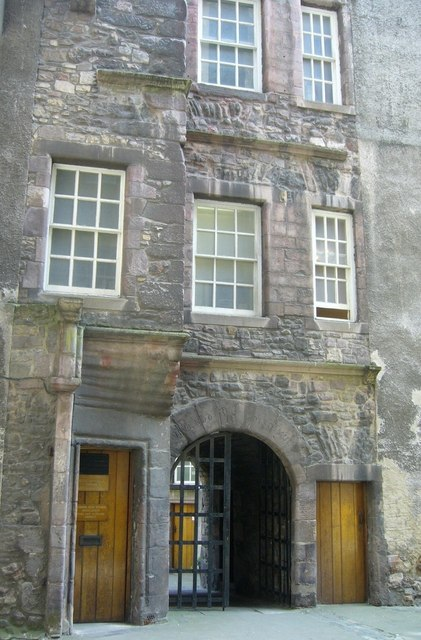
Jacques de Bousie prepared a sugar banquet at Riddle's Court

== Career ==
Bousie was asked to make confections in September 1589 for the arrival of Anna of Denmark, when it was expected she would sail to Scotland. Instead James VI went to Norway and Denmark to meet her. He sent Sir John Carmichael back to Scotland on 20 April 1590 with instructions for their reception, including, "speciallie that the Flemishe sugerman may be commanded to have in readiness all such confections and sweet meats as before he took in hand for the said banquets." Bousie, "confett maker", was paid £400 Scots for these desserts, and £18 for "confectors" supplied to James VI for his voyage. The "Flemish baker of sugar" was paid another £180 for confections and sweet meats for banquets at this time. Sugar products were held to have medicinal value, and while James VI was in Denmark the court physician John Naysmyth bought confitures and sweets called "scrotchets".

=== Confectionary as medicine ===
Comfits and confections were supplied the family of William Douglas of Lochleven probably for medicinal purposes. They bought from Sarah Kerwood, a "sweit meit wyfe" in Edinburgh, and the court apothecary Alexander Barclay supplied boxes of wet and dry confections. These were sometimes consumed for medicinal purposes.

=== Scrotchets ===
The sugar confectionaries called "scrotchets" were a regular feature of entertainments and banqueting. Letham's wife and Margaret Hewin supplied sugar and "schrochyettis" to James V, and Thomas Hamilton, a merchant in Linlithgow provided sugar candy. In August 1583 the town treasurer Mungo Russell was asked buy wine and "crotcherts" for the arrival of Francis Walsingham, an English ambassador. A 'scorchet' was a sugar sweet flavoured with rose water, known to have been served at Scottish celebrations and banquets since the 15th century. When Charles II was in Scotland in 1650, spices were bought in December for Christmastime from Andrew Reid, a merchant in Perth, including 13 pounds of "scrotckets and confects".

=== Sugar to welcome Anne of Denmark ===
During Anne of Denmark's formal entry to Edinburgh on 17 May 1590, she went up a street called the West Bow, where a boy with mathematical instruments played the female personification of Astronomy, "Astronomia" or "Astrologia". He recited Anne's fortune and the children she would bear in Latin verse composed by the schoolmaster Hercules Rollock. The actor predicted a hail storm and white sugar sweets were thrown from the windows of houses overlooking the scene. The child said this rain would fall into her lap, proving the truth of his prediction, alluding to the legend of Danaë. The 12 boxes of sweets, described as "scrotcherts and confects", cost £3-2s-8d Scots.

=== Banqueting in Scotland ===
The English ambassador Robert Bowes described a particular Scottish form of banqueting to William Cecil, as the details given of a banquet mentioned in a previous letter had puzzled Queen Elizabeth I. Bowes explained that some Scottish banquets consisted of "small provisions of delicates having spice [sweet]meat and wines, of no great matter or value." James VI and the Earl of Bothwell enjoyed a banquet like this, "with good liking and favourable countenances", on 15 August 1593 at the Shore of Leith before the king embarked in a ferry boat for Kinghorn. Jacques de Bousie would have supplied sweetmeats for such banquets.

A banquet held to celebrate a reconciliation between the town of Edinburgh and James VI in 1597, following a riot cost nearly £182 Scots, the cost of the "desert" provided by the "suckerman" was £23.

== The Flemish community in Edinburgh ==
Bousie became a favourite of Anna of Denmark, and in April 1592 she asked the council of Edinburgh to make him a burgess and guild brother. This was controversial because Bousie did not meet the town's strict criteria, so the council representatives James Nicoll, Thomas Aikenhead, Clement Cor, George Heriot elder, and George Heriot younger rode to Dalkeith Palace to speak to her about the request. The outcome is unknown.

The town authorities were keen to protect their livelihoods from incomers. In January 1594, the town allowed another Flemish craftsman, a clock and watch maker, possibly Adrian Bowdowingis or Bodwyne, a friend of the painter Adrian Vanson, or Abraham Wanweyneburgh who lodged in the Canongate in 1592, the right to work in his craft and have a shop, despite not being a burgess or free man of an Edinburgh craft, because he was contracted to regulate the town's clock. In 1600, when Adrian Bodwyne disputed the ownership of some jewels with a goldsmith, John Cunningham, Bodwyne took the case to the Court of Session, claiming that Edinburgh's bailie court would be biased against him, and he suffered delays because he was a "stranger".

Adrian Damman was a witness at the baptism of the sugarman's daughter Joanna on 10 October 1596. On 1 March 1600 Jaques de Bousie was a witness at the christening of James, a son of a passementerie maker Henry Stallinges.

== Stirling baptism ==
Jacques de Bousie made desserts shaped like fish which were served from a model ship in the Great Hall of Stirling Castle

Bousie worked at the baptism of Prince Henry at Stirling Castle in August 1594. Desserts were served in azure and gilt Venetian glasses from a model ship in the Great Hall, made in the form of a variety of sea foods "with other infinite things made of sugar, and most truly represented in their own shape." A sugar banquet in the Palace followed. Bousie and the sommelier Jerome Bowie were paid £220 for glasses to serve desserts.

Similar banquets with sculptural sugarwork were popular in England, including the entertainments for Queen Elizabeth at Harefield, and at Elvetham presented by the Earl of Hertford, where dishes included animals and mythical beasts.

== The Holstein Banquet ==
In May 1598 Bousie was employed by Edinburgh council for a banquet given in honour of Anna of Denmark's brother, Ulrik, Duke of Holstein, at Riddle's Court. He was paid £184 Scots and his "boys", his workers, were given ten shillings. Carrying Bousie's glass dishes and other equipment to the Banqueting House cost twelve shillings. Planks were borrowed from a timber yard at Leith for temporary shelves to display the desserts and patisserie. The chef was Hans Poppilman, the queen's Master Cook.

James VI bought sugar, hampers with glasses, and two barrels of boxes of comfits, confections, and banqueting stuff in London in November 1596. Another supplier in Edinburgh, Thomas Burnett, who regularly sold groceries to the royal households, provided sugar candy to the infant Princess Margaret in 1599. Bousie was paid £136 in March 1602.

De Bousie seems to have worked for Ulrik, Duke of Holstein, when he visited London after the Union of Crowns, and dhe elivered two petitions to the Earl of Salisbury concerning payment of the Duke's pension and debts.

== Family ==
His daughter, Isobel, was baptised at St Giles on 10 October 1596. The Dutch diplomat Adrian Damman was a witness.

His second marriage was recorded at the West Kirk of St Giles on 30 June 1601 between "Jacques de Bussyne" and Anna Dammaris.

It is not known if Jacques de Bousie was related to Elizabeth de Boussy, or Bousson de Podolsko, laundress to Anna of Denmark in England, who married the courtier James Maxwell.

== Banquets and the Kirk ==
Eventually, town authorities condemned banqueting. In 1624 Aberdeen ruled against "all sorts of sugars, confections, spiceries, and dessert, brought from foreign parts" and other extravagances at christenings.
