= John Clavie =

Scottish apothecary (died 1607)

- Born: Edinburgh, Kingdom of Scotland
- Died: 1607
- Occupation: Apothecary for the Royal Family

John Clavie or Clavee (died 1607) was a Scottish apothecary who worked for James VI and I and the royal family.

== Background ==
Clavie was based in Edinburgh and moved with the court to London on the Union of the Crowns. He was probably related to "Jhone Clavie" or "Clavye" (died 1586), a candlemaker who supported Mary, Queen of Scots in the Marian Civil War. The candlemaker John Clavie and his business partners were censured for exporting tallow in March 1569.

== Career ==
In April 1598, Edinburgh burgh hosted a banquet for Anne of Denmark's brother, Ulrik, Duke of Holstein, at the house of Ninian MacMorran at Riddle's court. Two apothecaries, John Lawtie and John Clavie sweetened and added spices to wine to make Hippocras. A third apothecary, Alexander Barclay made two pints of "vergeis" and a mutchkin of perfumed rose water.

Clavie was appointed an apothecary in ordinary to King James in March 1603, and appointed to serve Anne of Denmark, Prince Henry and the other royal children on 19 July.

Clavie wrote a will on 22 September 1607, which mentions his suppliers including Mr Wealthie, a comfit maker, Mr Hawkins, a grocer, and the apothecary Mr Lemire. The will was witnessed by the royal physician John Craig, Robert Johnson, and the surgeon Gilbert Primrose. He appointed Martin Schöner to be a supervisor of the will.

== Death ==
John Clavie died in 1607. He was replaced in the royal household by Lewis Lemire, an apothecary from Flanders.

== Family ==
He married Marie Aldinstoun. After Clavie's death, she married Patrick Livingstone, feuar of Saltcoats.
