= Gilbert Moncreiff =

Scottish court physician

Gilbert Moncreiff (died 1598) was a Scottish court physician.

== Career ==
In November 1575, Moncreiff joined the court of James VI as "medicinar and houshald man". He would live for four years at Stirling Castle in attendance on the young king. A pension awarded in October 1580 mentioned that he had served the king since his birth in 1566.

James Melville visited the king at Stirling with his uncle Andrew Melville in 1575. They also met Moncreiff, who was an old friend of Andrew Melville from their days in Geneva.

Moncreiff, Alexander Preston, with a Highland practitioner recorded as the "Irland leeche", George Boswell from Perth, and an Edinburgh apothecary Robert Craig attended the Earl of Atholl. He died on 25 April 1579 at Kincardine after a suspicious illness following a banquet hosted by the Countess of Mar at Stirling Castle. Moncreiff disagreed with other experts at the post-mortem. Doctor Preston was also recorded working for Agnes Keith, Countess of Argyll, and travelled to Inveraray in 1576.

On 16 June 1581, Moncreiff and Gilbert Skene examined Robert Stewart, Earl of March, in order to demonstrate that he was incapable of consummating his marriage, so that Elizabeth Stewart could obtain a divorce to marry James Stewart, Earl of Arran.

Moncreiff was involved in the education of the Duke of Lennox in 1583. He helped the poet Alexander Hume back to health, who subsequently wrote and published Ane Epistle to Maister Gilbert Montcrief.

Moncreiff worked with other physicians, surgeons, and apothecaries for James VI, his wife Anne of Denmark and their children, including the German doctor Martin Schöner, the surgeons John Naysmyth and Gilbert Primrose, and the apothecary Alexander Barclay.

On 10 February 1594, he was appointed to attend Anna of Denmark at Stirling Castle, when she gave birth to Prince Henry, with Martin Schöner and Gilbert Primrose, the apothecary Alexander Barclay, and the midwife, who was probably Jonet Kinloch.

In September 1596, with the Edinburgh merchant Clement Cor and kirk minister Robert Bruce he interviewed a woman from Nokwalter in Perth, Christian Stewart, who was accused of causing the death of Patrick Ruthven by witchcraft. She confessed she had obtained a cloth from Isobel Stewart to bewitch Patrick Ruthven, and repeated this confession to the king and Sir George Home at Linlithgow Palace. She was found guilty of witchcraft and burnt on Edinburgh's Castlehill.

Moncreiff died in Edinburgh on 24 February 1597/98. His inventory lists a stock of drugs, yellow sugar, and gold bullion including gold coins of James V, Maximilian II and Philip II, and Scottish unicorns. He accepted jewelry as pledges for debts.

== Marriage and children ==
Moncreiff married a sister of the Canongate dagmaker (pistol maker) David Clerk. Their children included; James, Margaret, Marie, Agnes, and Elizabeth.
