= John Craig (physician) =

Scottish physician and astronomer

- Born: Scotland
- Died: 1620

John Craig (died 1620) was a Scottish physician and astronomer. He was physician to King James. He corresponded with Tycho Brahe, and associated with John Napier.

== Physician ==
He was born in Scotland, the son of an Edinburgh tailor and merchant Robert Craig and Katherine Bellenden. The lawyer and poet Thomas Craig was his older brother. He graduated M.D. at the University of Basel. His 1580 thesis concerned the nature of the liver and was published as Diexodus Medica De Hepatis Dispositionibus.

Craig came back in Scotland, after a decade and a half on the continent of Europe, and was a physician to the king. He attended Agnes Keith, Countess of Moray in her final illness in Edinburgh in 1588, with the surgeon Gilbert Primose and the apothecary Thomas Diksoun.

He accompanied King James to London on James's accession to the throne of England. On 20 June 1603, James made him first physician with an annual salary of £100. His long-serving German doctor Martin Schöner was also appointed first physician with the same salary on 6 July.

In 1604, he was admitted a member of the College of Physicians of London.

He was incorporated M.D. at the University of Oxford on 30 August 1605; was named an elect of the College of Physicians on 11 December the same year; was consiliarius in 1609 and 1617; and died before 10 April 1620, when John Argent was chosen an elect in his place.

== John Craig, younger ==
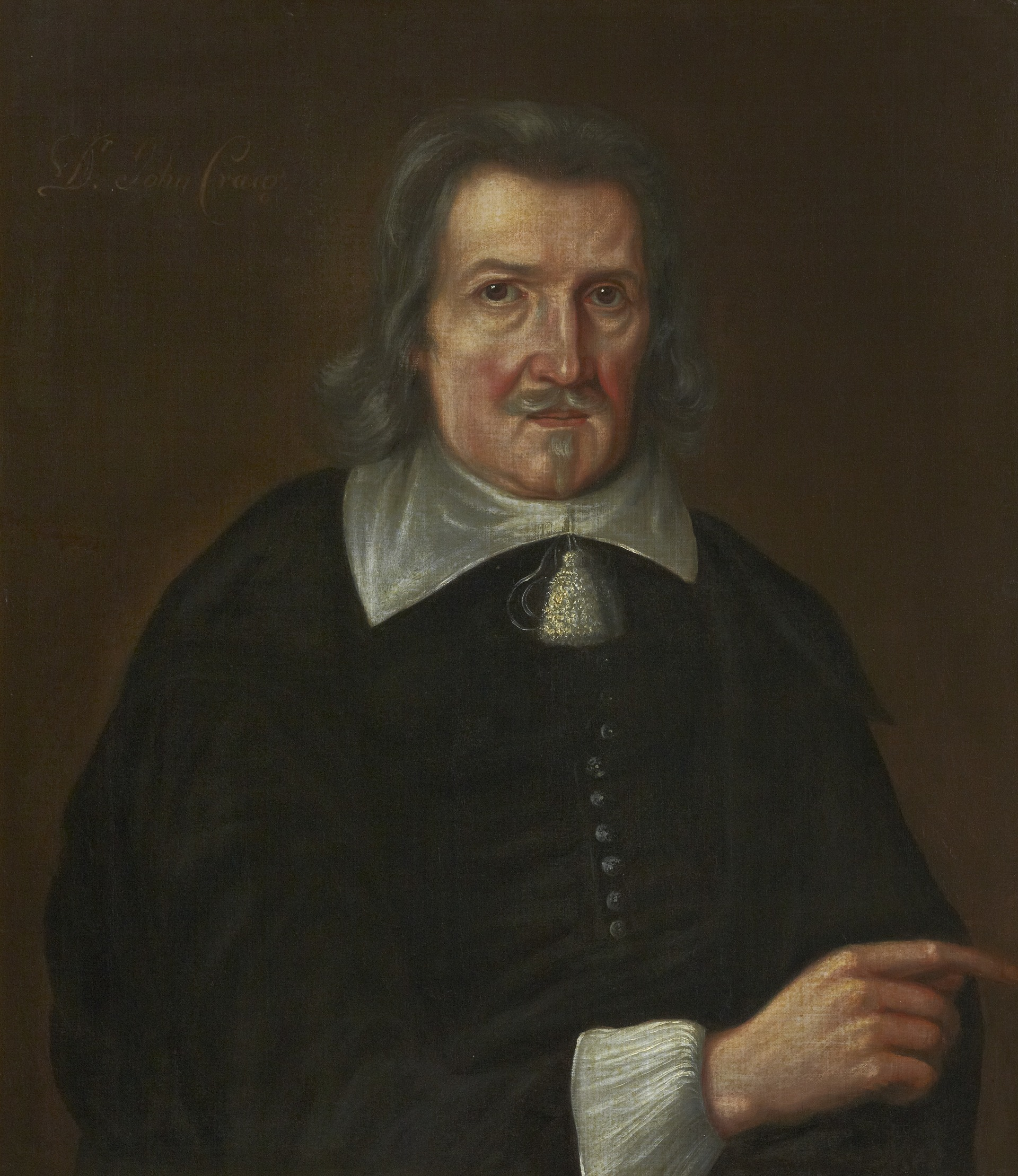
John Craig, younger (died 1655), National Galleries of Scotland

John Craig had a brother Thomas Craig. His son, the younger John Craig (died 1655), was also a physician. Thomas Overbury requested the services of "young Craig" (John Craig (died 1655)) as a physician when he was a prisoner in the Tower of London in April 1613. He attended the sick bed of King James in 1625. He criticised treatments suggested by Mary Villiers, Countess of Buckingham. For his speeches to the Countess, Craig was ordered to leave court.

== Astronomy and mathematics ==
Craig was an academic in Germany for an extended period. He was in Königsberg in 1569, and in 1570 as a medical student under Caspar Peucer. He was in Frankfurt-on-Oder in 1573, teaching mathematics and logic. Paul Wittich taught him astronomy at the University of Frankfurt (Oder) in 1576. John Craig owned a copy of Copernicus' De Revolutionibus Orbium Coelestium (1566 edition). He made notes from the lectures of Paul Wittich in this book. It was later owned by James Douglas of Whittinghame and is now held by the University of Edinburgh. Aberdeen University has a similar volume with Duncan Liddel's notes from Wittich lectures.

After his return to Scotland, Craig wrote a manuscript "Capnuraniae seu Comet, in Aethera Sublimatio" addressed to Tycho Brahe. Some of their correspondence was printed by Rudolf August Nolten. Craig's work was prompted by the Great Comet of 1577. The contact with Brahe was set up by William Stewart of Houston, a diplomat who frequently visited Denmark. Brahe sent Craig a copy of his 1588 De Mundi Aetheri Recentioribus Phaenomenis, probably with William Stewart. Brahe dated the gift at Uraniborg 2 November 1588 and the book is also now in Edinburgh University's library. However, Craig disagreed with Brahe's observations and conclusions.

According to Richard A. Jarrell:

Much of the transition … to the Copernican system … occurred during the last third of the sixteenth century. To a surprising extent, this transition was a product of German-speaking astronomers, and those foreigners educated by or in contact with them. Tycho, although a Dane, was as much a part of German astronomy as the Scots Duncan Liddel and John Craig, or the Czech Tadeáš Hájek (Hagecius).

Craig may have been the person who gave John Napier of Merchiston the hint which led to his discovery of logarithms. Anthony à Wood wrote that

one Dr. Craig ... coming out of Denmark into his own country called upon John Neper, baron of Murcheston, near Edinburgh, and told him, among other discourses, of a new invention in Denmark (by Longomontanus, as 'tis said) to save the tedious multiplication and division in astronomical calculations. Neper being solicitous to know farther of him concerning this matter, he could give no other account of it than that it was by proportionable numbers.

Napier himself informed Tycho Brahe, via Craig, of his discovery, some twenty years before it was made public.
