= Adrian Damman =

Dutch diplomat to Scotland

Adrian or Adriaan Damman of Bysterveldt (died 1605), a native of Ghent, was a diplomatic agent of the Dutch Republic in Scotland in the 1590s. Damman was an author, and taught at the University of Edinburgh. He was knighted at the baptism of Prince Robert in May 1602.

== Early career ==
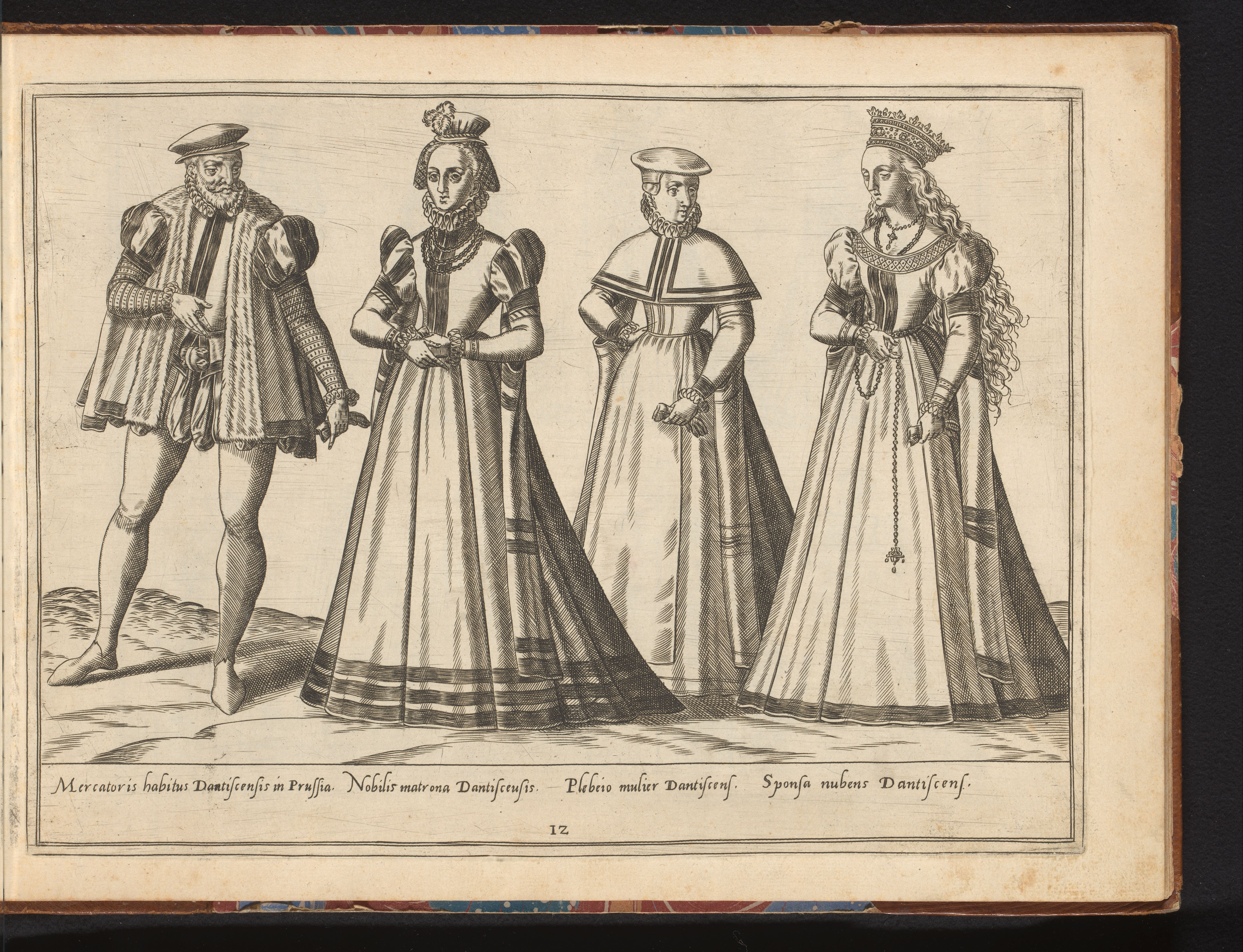
Adrian Damman provided the forewords and catalogue for costume books illustrated by Abraham de Bruyn.

He may be the subject of a portrait engraving of "Hadrianus Damman" dated 1578 attributed to Jacob de Gheyn II or Claes Jansz. Visscher, and in 1576, 1577, and 1578 he provided forewords for three costume books illustrated with woodcuts by Abraham de Bruyn.

Adrian Damman wrote a letter from "Bassevelde" on 2 May 1583 describing the activities and extortions of a Captain Yorck at Zaamslag and mentioning John Norris.

== Diplomacy and community in Scotland ==
An account of royal expenses made around November 1588 includes a payment of £266 Scots to "Adriane Dammane and some workmen Flemings". Damman wrote a poem De Introitu describing the royal entry and coronation of Anne of Denmark in June 1590, and corresponded with Justus Lipsius. Lipsius was rector of Leiden University where Damman had lectured on Aristotle's Politics.

In May 1591 (or 1592) a German aristocrat Johann Peter Hainzel von Degerstein and his tutor Casper Waser came to Scotland during a tour. They met Thomas Seggate or Seget (a former student of Lipsius) and Damman at Edinburgh University, and Waser wrote to Damman from Ayr a few weeks later mentioning Damman's work on a translation of Guillaume de Salluste Du Bartas's Creation. Damman published the translation in 1600 and included the letter.

In June 1592, the Parliament of Scotland created a new office, the Master of Metals to be in charge of mines and refining, and John Lindsay of Menmuir was appointed. Pressure was exerted on a prospector, Eustachius Roche, to resign his rights. Information damaging his reputation was collected from the Dutch Republic and Flanders by the means of the Adrian Damman, Robert Denniston, and a Scottish merchant in Antwerp, Jacob Barron (who was involved in lead mining in Scotland, and it was said that Eustachius was of "evil fame".

=== Baptism of Prince Henry ===
Damman described James VI urging the people of Edinburgh to fight against the Earl of Bothwell in April 1594 in a letter to Johan van Oldenbarnevelt. His position as resident agent in Scotland was confirmed by the ambassadors William Keith of Delny and William Murray of Pitcarleis on 19 June 1594.

In August 1594, Damman met the Dutch ambassadors Walraven III van Brederode and Jacob Valcke. They asked for him to be included in their commission and negotiations and he went with them to Stirling for the baptism of Prince Henry. On the day after the ceremony, the ambassadors sent "Agent Damman" to James VI to ask for permission to leave.

=== Flemish barque ===
A "Flemish barque" was impounded at Montrose on 27 April, suspected of bringing money to aid the Catholic earls, and brought to Leith. The English diplomat Robert Bowes heard that letters and gold from the ship were carried to Huntly Castle. Adrian Damman acted with the Flemish painter Adrian Vanson to free the sailors. They made a bond of £1000 Scots to release the skipper, Hendrick Michelsoun of Middelburg, Zeeland, from the Tolbooth of Edinburgh into house arrest. Vanson and Damman also put up a bond of £2000 "making caution" for Peter Herimansoun and Peter Mattiesoun, two sailors who had arrived in the ship at Montrose. The sailors were to remain in Edinburgh, Canongate, or Leith until the issues were settled.

In March 1595, a Scottish Jesuit, John Myreton, was arrested at Leith. He was found to be carrying a gold jewel which was subsequently given to Anne of Denmark. The English ambassador Robert Bowes shared what he knew about the incident with Damman. The Chancellor, John Maitland died on 3 October 1595. James VI composed an epitaph and Damman translated it into Latin.

Damman was godfather or a baptismal witness in 1596 to a son of Adrian Vanson, the portrait painter, and to a daughter of Jacques de Bousie a confectioner, and in October 1600 a witness to the baptism of Adrian, a son of a Flemish clockmaker in Edinburgh Adrian Bowdowingis.

=== Religious riots and witch trials ===
Damman mentioned James's financial committee, the Octavians, in a letter to Oldenbarnevelt in March 1596. He went to the Low Countries on business connected with the exiled Earl of Erroll, and was not Edinburgh in December 1596 during a protest at the tolbooth about religious and political issues. After his return to Scotland on 19 February 1597, he wrote reports for the States General about the events and David Black, who had called the royal court the "devil's house", the Edinburgh women who shouted the name "Haman" at the King, and about subsequent occurrences, apparently partly based on "official" versions supplied by James VI. The King imprisoned the laird of Buccleuch in Edinburgh Castle to please Elizabeth I which made people "rumble in their teeth" (grondée entre les dents) and caused bad feelings against England. Meanwhile, King James was involved in a witch hunt in Aberdeen and Dundee, and was nearly drowned in a ferry boat in a storm conjured on the Tay in May. Damman wrote that James's ship was safely towed to shore by several row boats, "il passoit en une navire tirée de plusiers esquifs à la rame". The English ambassador Robert Bowes included similar details in his reports.

=== Succession tract ===
In February 1598, Damman became involved in controversy when he contributed to a succession tract, a pamphlet arguing that James VI of Scotland should become King of England. The English diplomat George Nicholson reported that David Foulis had directed the printer Robert Waldegrave to publish a Latin succession tract written by Walter Quinn, a tutor to Prince Henry and corrected and edited by Damman. Such works argued that James VI should be Elizabeth's successor. Waldegrave was reluctant to print it. No copies of this work are known to have survived. This work was A Pithie Exhortation to her Majesty for Establishing a Successor to the Crown, printed by Waldegrave in 1598.

=== Gowrie House ===
At the end of July 1600, Colonel William Edmondes, a Scottish soldier in the service of the States General, arrived at Leith with a warship of the States, hoping to take on board a force of Scottish soldiers, and he and Damman brought letters from the ship to James VI. According to the English resident agent George Nicholson, James prevaricated, neither a friend to the States or inclined to show himself an enemy to Spain. Edmondes also conveyed a message of goodwill from the States to Prince Henry.

On 11 August 1600, Adrian Damman wrote an account of the Gowrie House affair, which resembles in part the narrative found in the letters of George Nicholson, with some interesting variations. Damman says that King James was friends with Alexander Ruthven and called him "Billy" like a brother.

Damman mentions the narrow turnpike stair accessing the private apartments at the top of the house as a particular feature of Scottish domestic architecture, possibly unfamiliar to his readers. Alexander Ruthven tried to tie the king's hands with his garter (jarretière), a detail mentioned in a letter of Thomas Hamilton. Damman wrote that Anne was distraught and welcomed James' late return to Falkland on 5 August with a page carrying a flaming torch. The Ruthven sisters were chased from her the household.

The Dutch warship gave James a cannon salute on his return to Leith and Edinburgh. James, it seems, was pleased to see Colonel Edmonds again after more than two decades, and Prince Henry sent his thanks to the States General with David Murray in one of his earliest letters.

== Family ==
After his wife Anna Tayaris died at their house in the Canongate in July 1600, Adrian Damman married Margaret Stewart (died 1610) in Edinburgh in May 1601. Tayaris was the mother of Sara Damman.

A son, Theophilus Damman, died at the siege of Hulst in 1596. Theophilus had married Maria van Swieten, a member of the nobility of Holland.

Damman visited London at the time of the Union of the Crowns, adding his autograph to the collection of Emanuel van Meteren on 7 May 1603. His son-in-law and a niece died of plague at this time.

In January 1604, his daughter Sara Damman (died 1611) married Jacques de Labarge, a Flemish merchant based in Edinburgh and Leith as an "indweller". He was involved in salt making at Newhaven with Eustachius Roche.

Records of baptisms in Edinburgh and Leith reveal a network of immigrant artisans. Jacques de Labarge was a witness at the baptism of a son of Adrian Bowdowingis the clockmaker, at the christening of Jacob in October 1601. He was also a witness to the baptism of a son of Henry Stollins, a passementerie weaver in March, the other witness was Jacques de Bousie a sugarman who worked for Anne of Denmark. Damman attended the christening of Hadrian Broun on 26 May 1605.

Adrian Damman died on 21 August 1605 in Edinburgh's Canongate. Margaret Stewart was his executor. His three younger children, Adrian, Frederick, and Sophia died within four years of his death. Adrian junior was a posthumous child. Damman had owned "papers, brods, and cairts" - papers, pictures and charts. Sophia was recorded as the owner of her father's golden chain and its pendant gold tablet (a locket or medallion) together worth £144 Scots, perhaps a gift from James VI. The item was in the keeping of her mother Margaret Stewart, who had remarried to Robert Hamilton, a brother of James Hamilton of Stanehouse (Stonehouse).

The will or executry mentions that the children received a pension from the estates of Holland because of their father's honourable service. Margaret Stewart received a pension from 1609. When Margaret Stewart died in October 1610, she owned four gold chains, a gold bracelet, and three luxurious pearl embroidered veils or "schadows", together worth £500 Scots. She had an infant son William Hamilton, and owed her son-in-law, the merchant Jacques de Labarge, £300.

== Works ==
Published works of Adrian Damman include:

- Schediasmata Hadr. Damanis a Bisterveld gandavensis (Edinburgh, Robert Waldegrave, 1590), a description of the voyages of James VI of Scotland and Anne of Denmark and their wedding. Damman descrcibes the Entry and coronation of Anne of Denmark and identifies the arches surmounting the tower of St Giles Cathedral as a representation of the Crown of Scotland.
- Bartasias; de mundi creatione (Edinburgh, Robert Waldegrave, 1600), a translation of works by Guillaume de Salluste Du Bartas, a poet admired by James VI. Damman included a letter from Casper Waser and a dedicatory verse by Anne of Denmark's minister Johannes Sering.

Diplomatic reports include:

- Report on the Gowrie House affair, 11 August 1600
