= Martin Schöner =

German physician (died 1611)

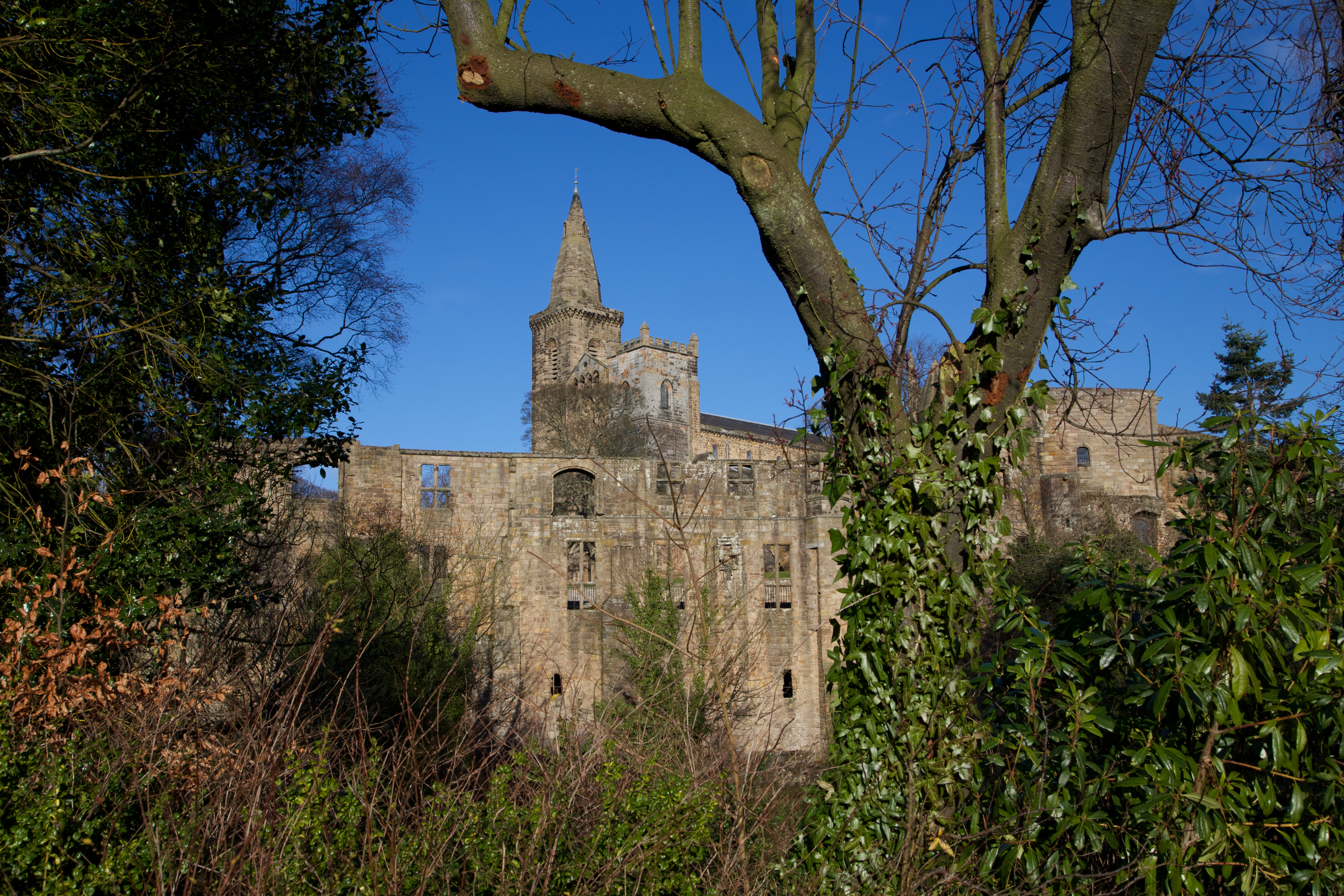
Martin Schöner attended Anne of Denmark at Dunfermline Palace

Dr Martin Schöner or Schönerus (died 1611) was a German physician to James VI and I and Anne of Denmark.

== Early years ==
Schöner was born in Głogów in Lower Silesia, then a part of the Habsburg Empire, and was considered to be from Thuringia. He is said to have been a nephew of the German polymath Johannes Schöner. Some English sources render Martin's name as "Schoverus", in Scottish records the name appears as "Schoneir" and "Schonerz". He used the title "Dr", but the university where he studied has not been identified.

== Court physician in Scotland ==
He became a physician to King James in 1581. On 22 July 1597 he was appointed "Master Medicinar" to Anne of Denmark, with a salary of £400 Scots, for a role he had performed for the previous three years, having been "ready day and night to attend upon that his office and service".

Schöner was called to Falkland Palace on 1 August 1590, perhaps to see Anne of Denmark, who may have been pregnant and later miscarried. On 10 February 1594 he was appointed to attend Anne of Denmark at Stirling Castle, where she gave birth to Prince Henry, with the physician Gilbert Moncreiff, the surgeon Gilbert Primrose, and the apothecary Alexander Barclay.

In September 1595 he attended John Maitland of Thirlestane, who had a "tertian fever". Maitland could not be made to sleep and his mind and body suffered. At first his opinion was that Maitland would not recover, and Jean Fleming, Lady Thirlestane summoned the minister Robert Bruce to Thirlestane Castle. Then Maitland's condition improved and Schöner wrote to court that he was past his danger. Maitland had a relapse and died on 3 October.

Schöner and John Naysmyth attended the infant Princess Margaret at Dalkeith Palace in 1598, and the births of Prince Charles and Prince Robert at Dunfermline Palace with the midwife Jonet Kinloch, the apothecary Alexander Barclay, and the laundress Margaret Douchall.

== Anne of Denmark and the incident at Stirling Castle ==
In May 1603 Anne of Denmark came to Stirling Castle to try to get her son Prince Henry from the keeping of the Earl of Mar. On 9 May, Marie Stewart, Countess of Mar and her stepson, the Master of Mar, told Anne they could not release the Prince to her, and later that day she fell ill and fainted at dinner. Lady Argyll, Lady Mar, Jane Drummond and Marion Boyd, Mistress of Paisley carried her to bed where she had a miscarriage. According to the lawyer, Thomas Hamilton, who was at the castle, the queen told Dr Martin, Margaret Seton, Lady Paisley, and others that she had taken "some balm water that hastened her abort."

There were suggestions that this miscarriage or abortion was self-induced, perhaps by the use of the "balm water". The Venetian ambassador in London, Giovanni Carlo Scaramelli, heard that the Prince's governess (meaning the Countess of Mar) had refused to give her the Prince, claiming Catholics might seize him in a revolt. He was told that Anne was furious and had beat her own belly.

Alexander Seton, the queen's legal adviser, went to Stirling, and later described how the "best expedient was to comfort and encourage her majesty, to give her good heart; in sum, physick and medicine requireth then a greater place, than economic or politic".

The Earl of Montrose, heard there was "a full assurance of her majesty's preservation and full recovery of her wanted (customary) health". As Lord Chancellor of Scotland, he made efforts to calm the controversy and help set Anne of Denmark on her way to England in June. Anne of Denmark was soon well enough to travel, and arrived at Windsor Castle on 10 July 1603. According to the French ambassador, the Marquess of Sully, when the Queen travelled to London, she "brought with her the body of the male child of which she had been delivered in Scotland, because endeavours had been used to persuade the public, that its death was only feigned".

== England ==
Schöner came to England and on 26 July 1603 James appointed him "ordinary" and "first doctor" to the queen with a salary of £100 Sterling. Another Scottish physician, John Craig had already been appointed "first doctor" on 20 June. Schöner may have delayed coming to London because his wife Christian Gibsoun was pregnant. He requested passes for four German gentleman to visit England.

On 24 April 1604 with Lancelot Browne he recommended the waters at Spa in Belgium to Henry Jerningham senior of Costessey for "all such griefs as he does complain of, namely the rheum, vertigo, convulsions, palsye, melancholia, hypochondriaca, obstructions, and the stone". This prescription was used by Jerningham to obtain a licence to travel abroad for his health. Schöner signed the document as, "Martinus Schonerus, Hir Maiesties Physicion".

Anne of Denmark's apothecaries in England were John Clavie, John Woolf, (or John Wolfgang Rumler), appointed on 26 November 1604 to provide sweet powders, waters, perfumes and other products, and later Gideon Delaune and Louis Lamere.

In 1605, Schöner with other royal doctors and members of the College of Physicians signed a testimonial recommendation for Matthias de l'Obel. He wrote his signature in Latin, "Martinus Schonerus, Britannia Reg[inae] Medicus Ordinarius". In August 1605, one of the queen's former ladies in waiting, Jean Stewart, Lady Bargany, travelled to consult him in London but he could offer no hope, she died at Stilton on her way back to Scotland.

In 1607 King James asked the Earl of Dunbar to write to Lord Carew, the Queen's Vice-Chamberlain, to summon Schöner to attend the ailing infant Princess Mary.

Schöner gave the king a New Year's gift of a box of confections in January 1606. The other physicians at court, John Craig, John Hammond, Henry Atkins, and Elvin, gave similar gifts. Schöner certified a bill for perfumes and rosewater supplied to Prince Henry over the past three years invoiced by Rumler in 1606.

At the baptism of one of his children on 30 January 1610, he was given a gift of £4 by David Murray of Gorthy, the keeper of the Privy Purse of Prince Henry.

Schöner was naturalized as an English citizen in July 1610 at the same time as other members of the queen's household; Dorothea Silking and her sister "Engella Seelken" from Gustrow, Katherine Benneken from Garlstorf, the apothecary John Wolfgang Rumler from Augsburg and his wife Anna de l'Obel from Middelburg, a daughter of Matthias de l'Obel.

He died in 1611, and in September 1611 his second wife and widow Christiana, or "Christian Schonero", was granted £150. Prince Henry also gave her a small pension.

Théodore de Mayerne was his successor as the queen's physician.

== Family ==
His first wife was Lucretia or Lucres Betoun, said to be a daughter of the laird of "Cassgoure" or "Carsgonny" now called "Carsegownie" in the Parish of Aberlemno and Catherine Ogilvy. Their children included;

- Johannes Schöner was born in Edinburgh on 2 July 1597. He studied medicine at the University of Edinburgh, Wittenberg, Frankfurt, and Greifswald. He married Catherine Erskine and died at Stralsund in April 1657.
- Edward, baptised 23 July 1598 with witnesses Edward Bruce, 1st Lord Kinloss and the surgeon Gilbert Primrose.
- Katherine, baptised 1 June 1600

Lucres Betoun died on 5 October 1600. Her will mentions her relation, possibly her father, Alexander Beaton, Archdeacon of Lothian, a son of Cardinal David Beaton and Marion Ogilvy, and owner of Carsegownie. The coat of arms of the Carsgonny Beaton family include a physician's cap as a crest. Alexander's cousin, David Beaton, a son of David Beaton of Melgund and another Lucretia Beaton, the daughter of Robert Beaton of Creich, was also a physician.

On 18 August 1601 he married Christian Gibsoun. Their children included;

- Alexander, baptised 15 August 1602
- Elizabeth, baptised 28 August 1603, witnessed by William Fowler, merchant of Edinburgh, son of Janet Fockart and elder brother of the poet William Fowler, whose wife Catherine Gibsoun was a relation of Christian. She married Adam Cunningham of Woodhall.
- Sophie (1604-15 November 1626), who married James Pringle of Whytbank in 1622, she was said to have been a maiden of honour to Anne of Denmark, and was the mother of Alexander Pringle. A portrait miniature of Anne of Denmark with rubies and gold chain was kept in the family. Sophie Schöner died on 15 November 1626 and was buried at Melrose Abbey. James Pringle never remarried, his arms are painted on an interior wall of their lodging at Moubray House in Edinburgh.
- Margaret, (died 14 November 1640), she married Harry Kinneir of Forrett. She was a donor to Edinburgh University, leaving a legacy of £1,466 used to build a chemical laboratory and library.
- Mr James (or Jacob) Schonier of Caskeberrie, now Caskieberran in Glenrothes. In 1627 he donated a copy of Francesco Piccolomini's Physica to Edinburgh university library.

Christian Gibsoun subsequently married Sir Robert Dennistoun or Danielstoun of Mountjoy, Conservator of Scottish Privileges in the Low Countries at Veere, and paid for his monument in Greyfriars Kirkyard. The inscription refers to his diplomatic missions to exiles abroad for King James, English and Spanish, presumably Catholic exiles.
