= John Naysmyth =

John Naysmith (or Naismyth or Nasmyth; 1556 – 16 September 1613) was a Scottish surgeon who became surgeon to King James VI of Scotland and was appointed Royal Herbalist in London when the monarch became King James VI and I at the Union of the Crowns. He was Deacon (President) of the Incorporation of Surgeons and Barbers of Edinburgh.

== Early life and education ==
John Naysmith was the younger son of Sir Michael Naysmyth (or Nasmyth) of Posso (1516–1607), Chamberlain to John Hamilton, the archbishop of St Andrews. His mother was Elizabeth,(1503-1606) daughter of John Baird of Posso (1483–1526), owner of the estate of that name in Peebles-shire. His elder brother James Naysmith inherited the Posso estate and became falconer to James VI. John Naysmyth's early education was at St Mary's College, St Andrews, after which he was apprenticed to the surgeon Gilbert Primrose in Edinburgh. He was admitted to the Incorporation of Surgeons and Barbers of Edinburgh in 1588.

== Career ==
Like his father, he was an active supporter of Mary, Queen of Scots. It is thought that he was a member of Lord Seton's party, a small select group who were entrusted to journey to England in 1575, ostensibly to pay homage to Queen Elizabeth, but in reality to smuggle letters to the imprisoned Mary Queen of Scots from the Scottish Regent, James Douglas, 4th Earl of Morton. This was achieved successfully, and, as a result of his part in this exploit he found favour with the teenage James VI. However, in 1575 Alexander Naysmyth lived in London and was questioned in April 1575 with others in England about letters delivered to Mary Queen of Scots by her supporters, not Regent Morton, notably a London bookseller, Henry Cockyn. Naysymth, according to Cockyn, took Mary's letters to the French ambassador.

Naysmyth was at the siege of Lochmaben Castle in June 1588 and attended a soldier dying from gunshot wounds. He accompanied James VI to Norway and Denmark in 1589 to meet his bride Anne of Denmark. He bought sugar confections called "scrotchets and confitures" in Copenhagen for the return journey, sweets which were thought to help sea sickness.

== Rebel ==
In an era of vacillating political loyalty, he was suspected of involvement in the December 1591 raid on Holyroodhouse by the Earl of Bothwell. He was imprisoned in Edinburgh Castle, and then Dumbarton Castle. Anne of Denmark interceded for him, saving his life. According to the courtier Roger Aston she argued with James VI that he had promised to spare his life. Several people, including Aston, tried to make her change her mind.

Naysmyth was ordered by the Privy Council to go abroad under caution of 1000 merks (£666 Scots). The caution was subsequently deleted by warrant of the king on 1 August 1593. He fled to France where he became Chief Surgeon to the Scots Guards of the King of France.

== Rehabilitation ==
He returned in 1595 and was forgiven for his earlier infidelity, and accepted back into the royal court. He was elected Deacon (President) of the Incorporation of Surgeons and Barbers of Edinburgh. He was at Falkland Palace on the occasion of the Gowrie Conspiracy in 1600. He married Helen Macmath in Edinburgh on 26 March 1600.

Naysmyth and Martin Schöner, Anne of Denmark's physician, attended the infant Princess Margaret at Linlithgow Palace in 1600, and the births of Prince Charles and Prince Robert at Dunfermline Palace with the midwife Jonet Kinloch and the apothecary Alexander Barclay.

Gilbert Primrose, his surgical master, had been surgeon to King James VI and became Serjeant-Surgeon when the King and his court moved to London on the occasion of the Union of the Crowns. Presumably, as a result of Primrose’s patronage, Naysmith was made a surgeon to the king, and he too moved with the court to London. The king made him Royal Herbalist for life. During his time in London, he attended Prince Henry during his fatal illness.

== Death and burial ==
Naysmith died in London and was buried in Greyfriars churchyard in Edinburgh where an elaborate monument marks his grave. The inscription in Latin is now almost obliterated but has been translated as follows;

Here lies John Nasmyth, of the family of Posso, an honourable family of Tweedale, a citizen of Edinburgh, chief surgeon to his most Serene Majesty and to the King of France's troop of guards from Scotland - having excellently performed all the duties of a godly life; who dying at London to the grief of both nations, in the exercise of office with his Majesty, ordered his body to be conveyed hither (such was his love to his country), to be buried in this dormitory; acquiting himself to his King, his country and his friends by the utmost of his power and duty. He died in the 57th year of his age, the 10th of September 1613. Why is it grievous to return whence you came?

His testament was proved in the Edinburgh Commissary Court on 19 January 1614
