= Thomas Foulis =

Scottish goldsmith, mine entrepreneur and royal financier (1580–1628)

Thomas Foulis (fl. 1580–1628) was a Scottish goldsmith, mine entrepreneur, and royal financier.

Thomas Foulis was an Edinburgh goldsmith and financier, and was involved in the mint and coinage, gold and lead mining, and from May 1591 the receipt of money given to James VI by Queen Elizabeth, known as the English annuity or subsidy.

He was a son of Henry Foulis of Colinton and Margaret Haldane. As a financier to the mint and crown his business partner was Robert Jousie, or Jowsie, an Edinburgh cloth merchant who later became Groom of the Chamber.

== Craftsman ==
Foulis was made a master of the Edinburgh Incorporation of Goldsmiths and a burgess on 18 June 1581 after submitting an essay of silverwork. His master had been Michael Gilbert. A son David followed him into the craft.

In February 1581/2 he made new dies for minting coins, following the designs of Lord Seton's painter. He was appointed "sinker of irons" at the mint in January 1584, as the successor of James Gray.

In March 1588 Foulis complained to the Privy Council about James Acheson, a son of John Acheson in Edinburgh's Canongate, who had a licence to make counters or jetons. Acheson's activities interfered with Foulis' monopoly as "sinker" or die maker. The Council declared that Acheson's making of latten (pewter) counters was not prejudicial to Foulis' rights.

In 1590 he made a silver-gilt and engraved basin and ewer for Queen Elizabeth's christening gift to Elizabeth Stewart, the daughter of Francis Stewart, 5th Earl of Bothwell and Margaret Douglas, and he advanced the English ambassador Robert Bowes £20 sterling to reward the servants and musicians at the baptism, which was held in Edinburgh.

In April 1593 the English ambassador Lord Burgh and the resident diplomat Robert Bowes borrowed £300 sterling from Robert Jousie, Thomas Foulis, and John Porterfield in order to reward potential supporters of English policy.

== Royal costume and jewelry ==
Michael Gilbert and his former apprentice Foulis provided rings and other jewels for James VI to give to courtiers as New Year's Day gifts. The bill was £763 in 1582/3 and rose in January 1588 to £5,100.

In 1587, Edinburgh burgh council and the Provost John Arnot challenged exemptions from taxes claimed by some royal servants including the tailors James Inglis and John Murdo, the apothecary Alexander Barclay, the surgeon Gilbert Primrose, the clockmaker Robert Purves, and the goldsmiths Thomas Foulis and John Burrell. Working for the king and the royal mint brought Foulis privileges and exemptions from taxes which brought resentment in Edinburgh, and the town's authorities refused to 'book' one of his apprentices in February 1591.

In June 1589 Foulis provided the king with two gold chains and rings worth £953 Scots to give to the captains of an English fleet commanded by George Beeston. Beeston was also given a gold locket set with diamonds, costing £373, and 100 crowns worth £266 were given to his sailors. This generosity was connected with the aftermath of a fatal struggle between Beeston's sailors and Armada veterans on the streets of Edinburgh.

James VI sent Foulis and Robert Jousie to London in July 1589 to buy clothes and ornaments in preparation for his marriage to Anne of Denmark. In pledge of payment for these purchases and for jewels and silver plate made in his workshop, James gave him two cut rubies and three cabochon rubies set in gold "chatons" or buttons, enamelled with red, white and black. Foulis returned these royal jewels to the depute-treasurer Robert Melville in October 1589, when James VI sailed to Norway. At Leith, Foulis also returned a large table cut diamond which he had held in pledge since January 1586 for the jewelry supplied to the king for New Year's Day gifts. When James returned to Scotland in May 1590, Foulis provided gold chains for gifts to the Danish Admiral Peder Munk and his companions.

Foulis supplied jewels to James VI and Anne, while Jousie supplied clothes and fabrics, paid for in part by a subsidy or annuity provided by Queen Elizabeth. In August 1594 Foulis bought eight ruffs in London for queen. Foulis also had a stock of fabric at his death.

In January 1597 Foulis was paid for a diamond and ruby ring, a ring with a great table cut diamond, a ring set with seven diamonds, a ring with eleven diamonds, a tablet or locket with an emerald and ten diamonds, and a "carcan" necklace with diamonds rubies and pearls. The total value was 790 crowns or £2,765 Scots. James VI had given some of these rings and jewels as New Year's Day gifts to his courtiers. His account mentions three rings set with eleven diamonds, one given to Marie Stewart, Countess of Mar. The rings may have been of a similar design, but were valued at 80, 120, and 300 crowns.

According to the Scottish diplomat and intriguer Archibald Douglas, James VI gave a valuable ring to Anthony Bacon, the secretary of the Earl of Essex. The ring was selected from a goldsmith in London by Foulis who gave it to Bacon and accounted for it from the subsidy money the king received. Bacon later tried to pawn the ring with the same London goldsmith, who said it was worth only half the amount that Foulis had claimed. While this story may be in part malicious gossip, it shows that some of the subsidy money was spent in London. There is also evidence that textiles were supplied to Foulis and Jousie by the London merchant Baptist Hicks.

== Miner and refiner ==
In March 1592 Foulis was involved in a project to refine old silver Scottish coins with Sir William Bowes in London. Foulis also operated a copper mine near Edinburgh for the king and was permitted to use wood from the forest of Torwood to make charcoal for refining. In January 1594 he had a tack or lease given in acknowledgement of money owed to him by the king and queen, to mine and export all minerals and metals in the Friarmoor in Lanarkshire, a former possession of Newbattle Abbey.

In March 1594 one of his mining experts Bernard Fechtenburg was tempted away by Lord Menmuir, Master of Metals, to work for Sir David Lindsay of Edzell Castle. Fechtenburg said that Edzell's samples of ores were more promising than an assay made by Foulis' other experts. In April 1594 he received a grant to prospect and mine for gold, silver, lead, tin and other metals, in Lanarkshire. The grant mentioned mines previously worked by George Douglas of Parkhead.

He became known as Thomas Foulis of Leadhills. In June 1597 after one of his convoys carrying lead towards Edinburgh was robbed by border outlaws, the Privy Council authorised Foulis's carriers to have a lead badge with the king's arms and wear Foulis's own insignia, and anyone who tried to rob them would be executed.

The English gold prospector George Bowes complained in a letter to Lord Essendon that Foulis had disrupted his workings in 1604 by detaining his English timber man. He hoped that Lord Balmerino, Secretary for Scotland would help him. Bowes was staying at Codrus Cottage, above Wanlock Water.

== Silver at Hilderston ==
Silver was discovered on lands at Hilderston near Bathgate in 1607. The prospector Bevis Bulmer and Thomas Foulis opened a silver mine called "God's Blessing". In 1608 Thomas Foulis and George Foulis, also a goldsmith, assayed ore from the mine. The site at Hilderston was developed by Bulmer, the "knight governor of the works of his majesty's mines under ground", with George Bruce of Carnock acting as treasurer. In 1613 Foulis obtained the contract for the mine with William Alexander of Menstrie and Paulo Pinto from Portugal.

== Royal finance ==
Foulis was involved in accounting royal money for the Chancellor, John Maitland of Thirlestane and his wife Jean Fleming, the "Lady Chancellor", in the years 1588 to 1590. The money came from the English subsidy, a regular gift to James VI from Queen Elizabeth. Foulis made and signed draft accounts of this money for Maitland and his wife which survive in the National Library of Scotland and have been published by the Scottish History Society.

The accounts include a "cupboard" of silver plate for Maitland to which Foulis himself contributed ten silver trencher plates. This may be the cupboard of silver plate which James VI took to Norway, in Maitland's keeping, from which he gave gifts to Steen Brahe and Axel Gyldenstierne on 15 December 1589.

Foulis was sent to London in June 1591 for the subsidy and requested £14,000, which was refused, and received £4000. In July 1592 the sum suggested was £2000, and James VI argued that he deserved more, particularly after the rendition of the Irishmam Brian O'Rourke.

In September 1594, Foulis went to London to collect silver plate for James VI. He hired a wagon to transport the silver to Scotland. The king owed Foulis £14,598 Scots and gave him two gold cups which he could coin into gold £5 pieces if he was not repaid. These cups had been presented by the Dutch ambassador Walraven III van Brederode at the baptism of Prince Henry. At the same time, another creditor, John Arnot, was given a gold cup with the option to have it coined.

=== The account of the annuity ===
Thomas Foulis made an account for the years 1594 to 1596 of £70,000 Scots received for James VI from the English subsidy, with money from the duty on his gold mines of Crawford Mure and Robert Mure, a sum received from Thomas Acheson at the royal mint, and a sum from the Secretary, Richard Cockburn of Clerkington. Altogether the receipt or "charge" totalled £84,470 Scots. The original manuscript is held by the National Records of Scotland with some of the king's precepts authorising payments, and has been published in full.

Elizabeth had let it be known that the money given to Cockburn should be taken to Scotland, and not spent in London, as had happened in previous years. Some of this money went to Foulis and Robert Jousie for clothes already delivered to the king and queen. Most of the rest was spent on jewellery given to Anne of Denmark, and to the ambassadors at the baptism of Prince Henry, or given as New Year's Day gifts. The Master of Work William Schaw was given a hat badge in the form of a gold salamander set with diamonds. Some of the original orders signed by James VI survive, In May 1594 he wrote he to Foulis, who was in London, to buy lead to repair the roof of Linlithgow Palace and an alabaster stone for the new Chapel Royal at Stirling Castle. Gold chains for gifts to ambassadors in 1594 were made by George Foulis. On 16 August 1595 James ordered Foulis to repair and enlarge two silver chandeliers for Prince Henry. He gave the pen to the infant prince to mark the paper, and wrote "I will testifie this is the prince's awin mark."

== Bankrupted ==
There were doubts about his credit in November 1596. In May 1597 Foulis and Jousie were made collectors of a new custom of 12% on imports, with powers to confiscate the sails of ships in case of non-payment.

Foulis became involved in the administration of the Scottish exchequer by the group knowns as the Octavians. In October 1597 one of the group, the king's advocate Thomas Hamilton, married Foulis' sister Margaret. They gave him a role on 29 December 1597 overseeing royal expenditure. However, Foulis was bankrupted by the scheme on 17 January 1598. Roger Aston wrote that Foulis was treasurer in all but name and after twenty days "fell by his wits" and lay "in great extremity". David Calderwood called his distress a frenzy, "phrenesie". Aston wrote that he had hoped Foulis and Joussie would lend him money to buy land, but they had received no English subsidy for two years.

The English correspondent George Nicolson provided an alternative explanation for Foulis' distress, that James VI had taken back a jewel pawned to Foulis, the Great 'H' of Scotland. James had given the jewel to Anne of Denmark who, Nicolson says, had offered it to her friend Elizabeth Douglas, Countess of Erroll as recompense for the demolition of Slains Castle. Foulis had received the "H" in pledge for a loan of £12,000 Scots made to the king in September 1594, and the Privy Council asked his brother, James Foulis of Colinton to return it in January 1598.

The immediate cause of Foulis' financial disaster was a legal move by one of the Octavians, John Lindsay of Menmuir, Master of Metals, to suspend payments by the comptroller, George Home of Wedderburn. It remains unclear if Lindsay and other Octavians and the king planned this to bankrupt Foulis and if so, fully understood the consequences.

James Hudson wrote in May 1598 that Foulis had pawned a gold lion set with a ruby worth £400 with the London goldsmith Robert Brook of Lombard Street, which Hudson suggested belonged to James VI. Robert Jousie was unable to pay Brook's interest or other sums due by Hudson, or the money they jointly owed to Hudson. He considered having Jousie arrested for debt in London.

Foulis recovered from his illness and on 2 August 1598 Foulis and Joussie obtained a contract (a tack) to operate the mint for six years in recompense of their losses, paying an annual rent of £5,000. The Parliament of Scotland observed that Foulis and Joussie had incurred debts for the royal clothing, jewels, ready money, and other outlays. Walter Stewart, 1st Lord Blantyre was asked to give them rights over the mint to recoup their funds, and the comptroller George Home of Wedderburn promised to supply the royal households (for James, Anna, Prince Henry, and Princess Elizabeth), and repay Foulis and Jousie and their creditors in installments.

Foulis and Jousie gave a statement of their debts to Parliament which included £145,700 and interest on that sum to £33,000 Scots. They listed the names of creditors, who had loaned them money with which they financed the royal household. It includes the Edinburgh Company of Tailors, the merchant and poet John Burell, the English courtier Roger Aston, the Countess of Cassilis, and Bartholomew Kello, the husband of the calligrapher Esther Inglis. Kello's loan of £4,000 was one of the larger contributions, and the merchant Jacob Baron had invested £14,822 Scots.

In February 1599 the Privy Council declared that in future the Treasurer would administer the English annuity or subsidy, spending it on clothes for the royal family and the household of Prince Henry. A report of Scottish royal finances sent to England in February 1600 noted that Foulis and Joussie and their partners were 'wrecked and undone'. In November 1601 the Privy Council was asked to convene with Foulis and report the values of royal jewels which Foulis had sold in England.

He died in Edinburgh in 1628.

== Family ==
Foulis married firstly Jean Francis, who died in 1623, then Rachel Porteous. Jean had sons, Thomas and David Foulis of Glendorch, and three daughters, Margaret, Jean, and another who married James McMath. After his death a cousin, Anne Foulis, who was married to James Hope of Hopetoun, eventually inherited the mining wealth.
