= Arthur Hamilton of Mirretoun =

Alexander Hamilton of Mirretoun (died 1579) was a soldier who fought for Mary, Queen of Scots, during the Marian civil war.

== Family background ==
His lands were at Merryton near Larkhall, in South Lanarkshire within the old parish of Hamilton, South Lanarkshire and near Cadzow Castle. He was captain of Hamilton Castle and Cadzow Castle. Arthur Hamilton is sometimes said to have been a brother of the assassin James Hamilton of Bothwellhaugh, but this not correct.

== Civil war ==
According to David Hume of Godscroft, Hamilton was blamed for the defeat of Mary, Queen of Scots, at the battle of Langside. As Mary seemed to hold John Stuart of Castleton in higher regard, Hamilton taunted him and Stuart made an unwise attack to prove his bravery after Arthur Hamilton shouted "Where are now these Stuarts that did contest for the first place, let him now come and take it".

In January 1571, Arthur Hamilton helped Claud Hamilton, 1st Lord Paisley take Paisley Abbey and the Place of Paisley from Lord Sempill.

Arthur Hamilton came to Edinburgh Castle on 19 May 1571, with Claude Hamilton and Robert Hamilton of Inchmachan. On 22 April 1571, Alexander Baillie and Arthur Hamilton captured the king's tailor James Inglis near St Cuthbert's Church. Inglis was returning from Stirling Castle, where he had been fitting the king's clothes. Inglis was imprisoned in Edinburgh Castle. The tailor was released two days later after the Deacon of Crafts had spoken with William Kirkcaldy of Grange, Captain of the Castle.

Arthur Hamilton was injured in a skirmish in May 1571, when Lord Herries, Maxwell, and Lochinvar attempted to captain a fort at the Dow Craig near Edinburgh. David Calderwood wrote that he was "run through with a spear".

== Death ==
Regent Morton sent an army against the Hamilton family and their strongholds in May 1579. Arthur Hamilton was captured at Hamilton Castle, and hanged at Stirling on 30 May 1579.
