= James Inglis (tailor) =

Scottish tailor who served James VI of Scotland

James Inglis was a Scottish tailor who served James VI of Scotland.

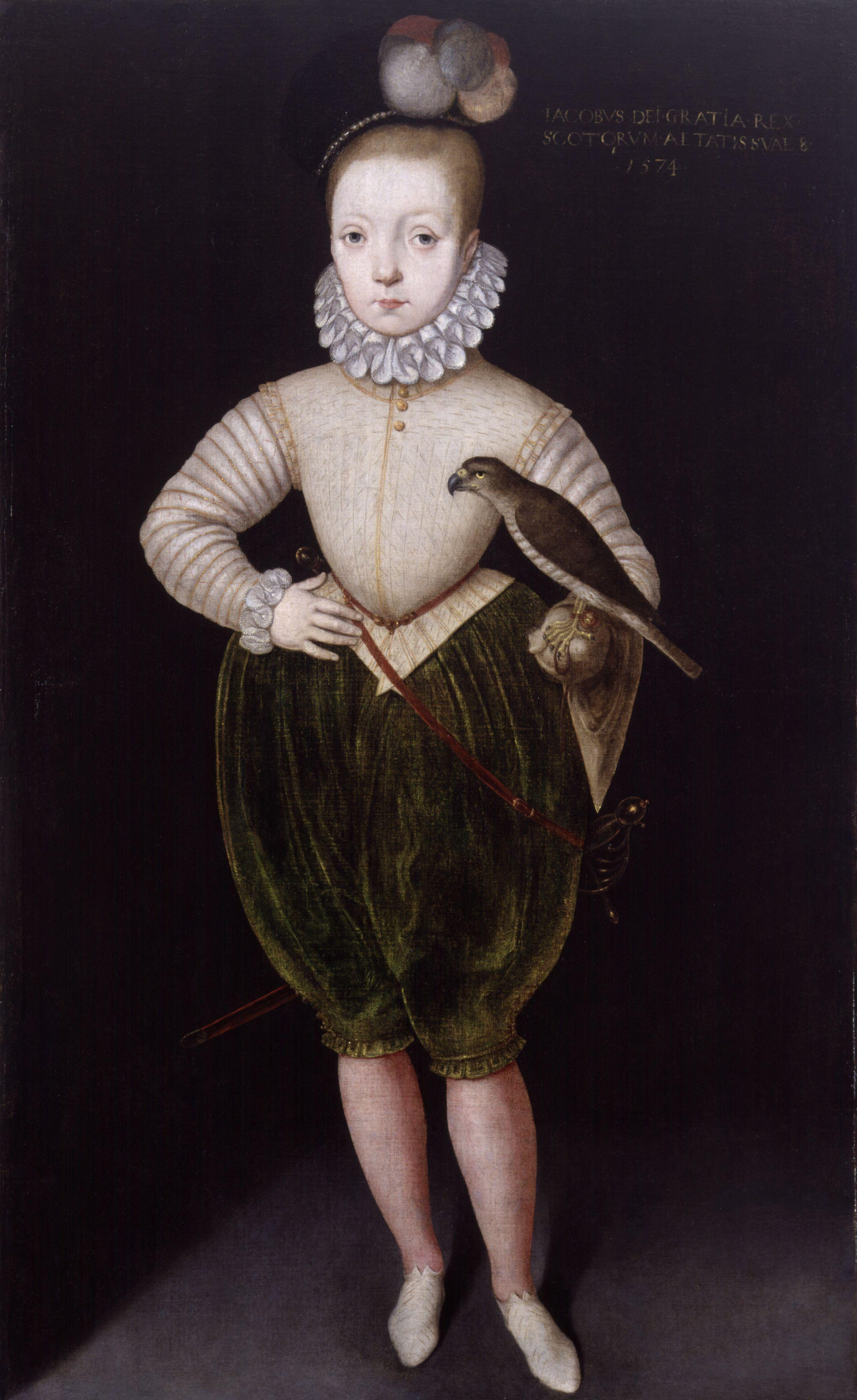
James VI, after Arnold Bronckorst

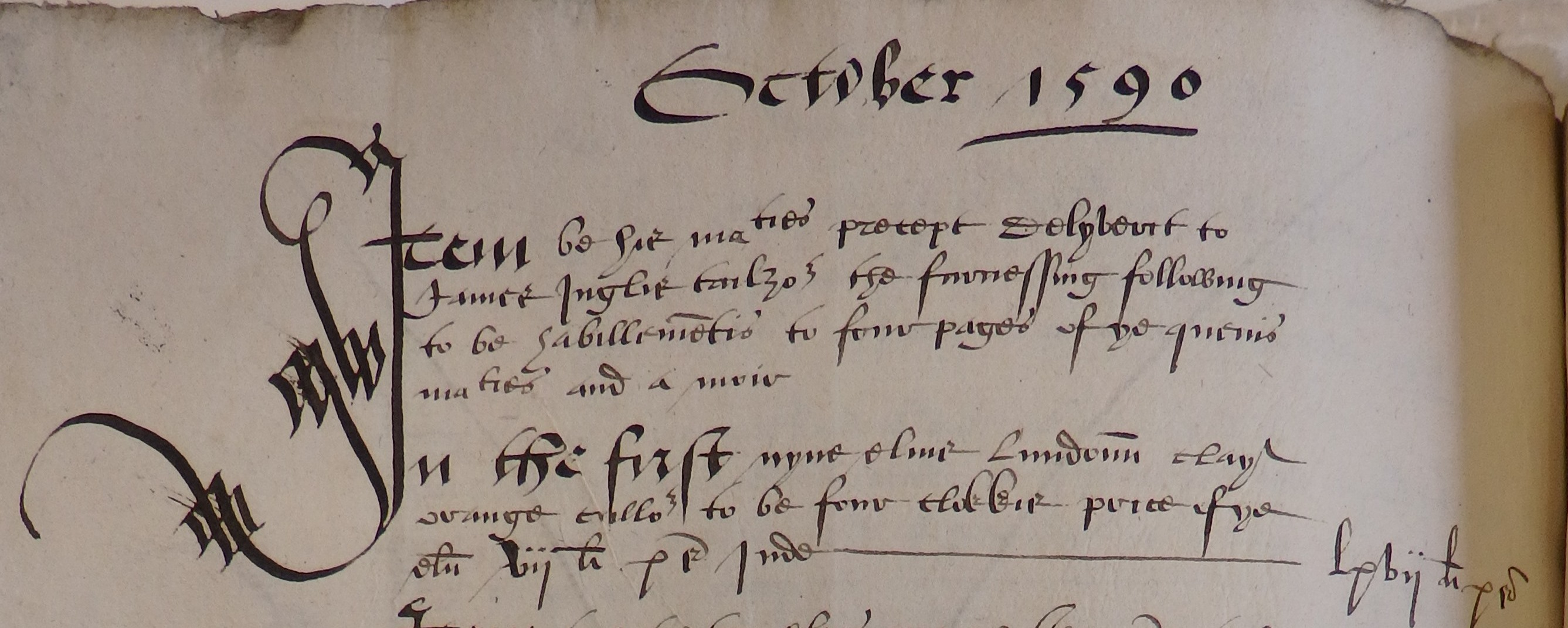
Inglis supplied clothes for four pages and a "Moir" in October 1590, Treasurer's Accounts, National Records of Scotland.

== Career ==
He was a son of Annabell Hodge. In August 1562, he made clothes for Monsieur Mernay (Guillaume Mernais), a member of the household of Mary, Queen of Scots. Queen Mary appointed him tailor to her son on 24 January 1567.

In July 1567, the Privy Council ordered him to make coronation robes for James from fine crimson velvet, blue velvet, red taffeta, and fur. James was crowned at Stirling.

His work took him between Edinburgh and Stirling Castle, where the infant king was kept by the Earl of Mar and Annabell Murray. The ruler of Scotland, Regent Moray bought him a horse in February 1569 for £30, provided by Jerome Bowie, the keeper of the king's wine cellar.

Inglis became involved in the Marian Civil War. On 22 April 1571 two Marian supporters, Arthur Hamilton of Merrynton and Alexander Baillie of Lamington, captured him near St Cuthbert's Church in Edinburgh. He was returning from Stirling Castle, where he had been fitting the king's clothes. Inglis was released two days later after the Deacon of Crafts had spoken with William Kirkcaldy of Grange, Captain of Edinburgh Castle.

William Betoun was appointed as embroiderer to the King on 25 July 1573. Inglis supervised a workshop of craftsmen who were rarely mentioned in the royal accounts, but in May 1578 the young King ordered that Inglis' "servandis" should be given "drinksilver", a kind of tip, for their efforts.

In 1587, Edinburgh burgh council challenged exemptions from taxes claimed by some royal servants including the tailors James Inglis and John Murdo, the apothecary Alexander Barclay, the surgeon Gilbert Primrose, the clockmaker Robert Purves, and the goldsmiths Thomas Foulis and John Burrell.

In May 1590, James Inglis worked on costumes for a Highland dance and a sword dance performed at the entry and coronation of Anne of Denmark. In October 1590, James Inglis collaborated with another tailor, Alexander Miller, to make a costume for an African servant at court, who is known only as the "Moir", including an orange velvet "jupe" and breeches and a doublet of shot-silk Spanish taffeta festooned with white satin passementerie.

James Inglis continued as the king's tailor into the 17th century, serving in total for 32 years. He was petitioning for payment of his annual fee in June 1611. The money had been paid by George Home, 1st Earl of Dunbar as master of the Royal Wardrobe.

== Marriages and children ==
His first wife was Françoise Mullinno, who died in 1569. Her will mentions a pair of gold bracelets and a silver girdle which she left to her sister. She gave her clothes to family and friends and small token gifts to her husband's apprentices and her servant Helen Kello.

James Inglis married secondly Helen Craig. She seems to have been a relation of the lawyer Thomas Craig, whose father Robert Craig had been a tailor and textile merchant.
