= John MacMorran =

Merchant and Baillie of Edinburgh (1553-1595)

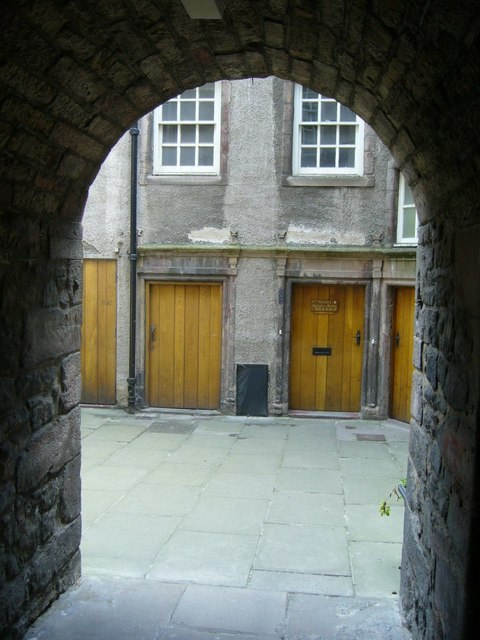
Looking into the courtyard of Riddle's Court where MacMorran lived

Baillie John MacMorran (1553-1595), a merchant and Baillie of Edinburgh, was killed during a riot at Edinburgh High School. His house at Riddle's Court is a valued monument on Edinburgh's Lawnmarket.

== Career ==
John MacMorran was a merchant involved in shipping, with shares in nine ships worth over £4,000 at his death, and had exported one cargo of wax and salmon worth £3,928, large amounts at the time, indicating he was one of the wealthiest merchants in Edinburgh. He built a large house in Edinburgh's Lawnmarket, which still survives, and is now known as Riddle's Court. A carved window frame with shutters from the MacMorran house was displayed at Edinburgh's Huntly House museum.

MacMorran had been a servant of Regent Morton in the 1570s, obtaining a reward as Morton's "domestic and familiar servitor" in August 1576. It was said that he helped conceal the former Regent's treasure. The townspeople complained that MacMorran exported grain to Spain (a Catholic country) in times of dearth.

In March 1590 MacMorran wrote to Archibald Douglas, a Scottish diplomat in London to help resolve a shipping dispute. MacMorran was in Dover, and was investigating an old claim against Edward Betts who had robbed one of ships four years earlier. He hoped to recover the cost of two cannon and a cargo of lead.

== Death at Edinburgh High School ==
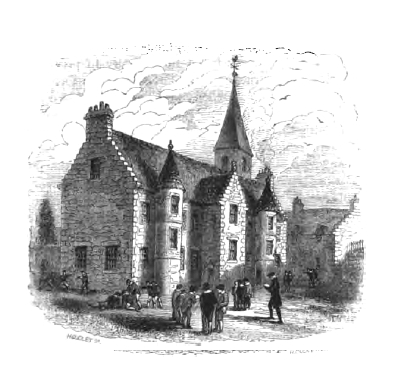
Edinburgh High School at Blackfriars

The scholars at Edinburgh High School were disputing the length of their holidays. They managed to shut themselves up in the building, at that time on the site of the old Blackfriars Monastery, near the present-day Drummond Street. After two days, on 15 September 1595, the town council sent John MacMorran, as a Baillie of Edinburgh, to end the sit-in. MacMorran and his men were about to break in, using a beam as a battering-ram, when he was shot in the forehead and died instantly. The shot was fired from a window by the 13-year-old son of William Sinclair of Mey, uncle and Chancellor of the Earl of Caithness.

The boys either fled or were captured. Justice was delayed for several months, as both the children' families and MacMorran's family were wealthy and able to ask the King, James VI of Scotland, to intervene. Lord Home made representations for one English culprit, the son of one Richard Foster, who was the first prisoner to be released. The English diplomat George Nicholson heard the town would benefit by raising contributions for building churches from the boys' supporters. Seven were released soon after James Pringle of Whytbank (who lived at Moubray House), made a plea on their behalf to the Privy Council late in November. Eventually young William Sinclair and all the others were released without penalty.

The schoolmaster, and prolific poet in Latin, Hercules Rollock, was sacked.

John MacMorran was buried in the kirkyard of Greyfriars, and a memorial inscription in Latin praised his services to the town.

== House at Riddle's Court ==
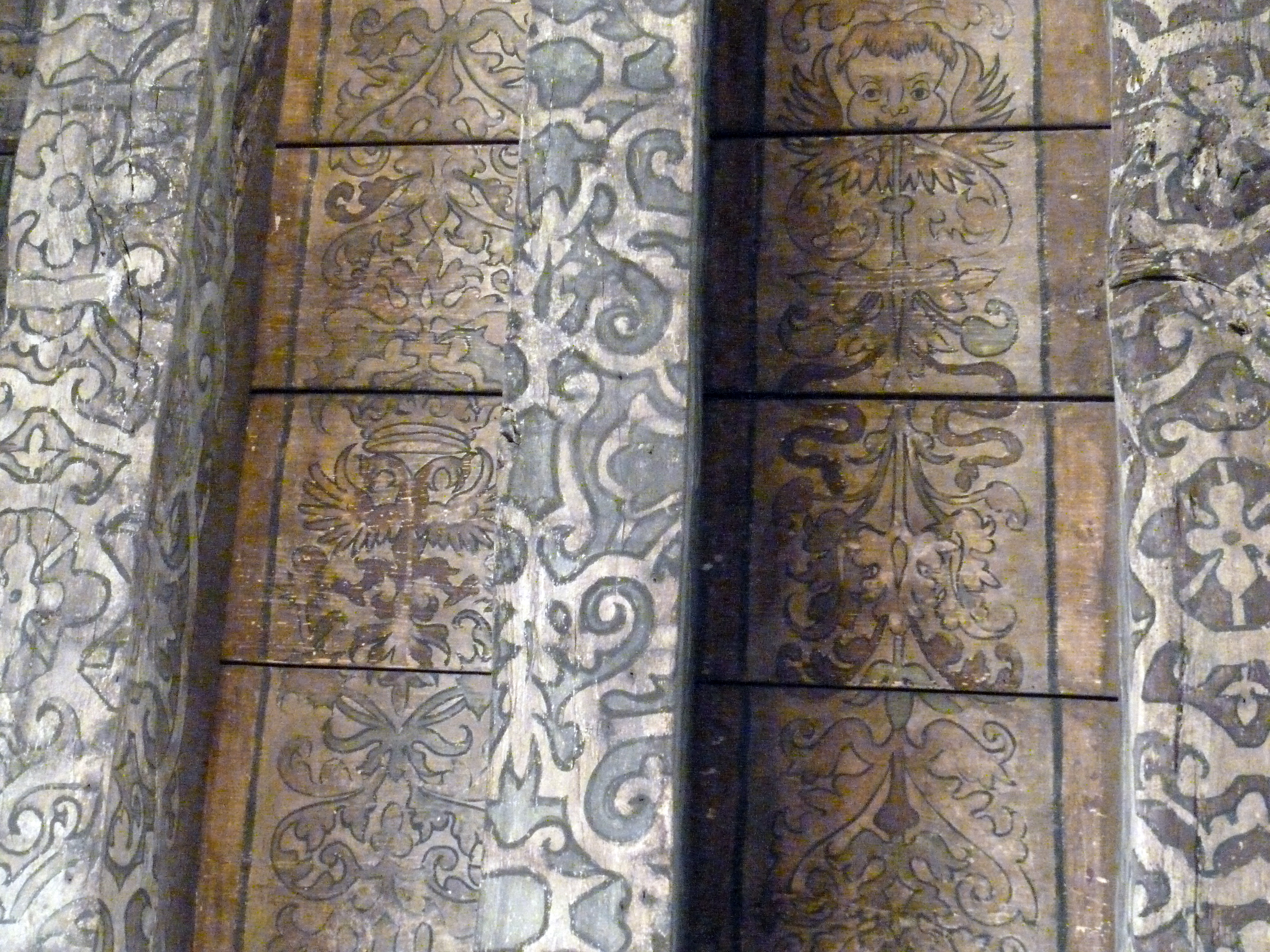
16th-century painted ceiling with Imperial eagle and thistle motif at Riddle's court

John MacMorran's house and contents, and his business, passed to his brother Ninian, to administer for John's children and his widow Katherine Hutcheson. At the time of his death, Bailie John owned part shares in several ships including the Anna (named for Anne of Denmark), the Grace of God, the Pelican, the Good Fortune, the Elspeth, the Fleur-de-lys, and the Thomas. He had a fortune in gold coins. An inventory of the furnishings of the house at John's death survives in the National Archives of Scotland. A walnut dresser in his dining room was probably a French import. The house was described by the antiquarian and historian Daniel Wilson.

Alexander Seton, 1st Earl of Dunfermline rented accommodation from MacMorran, probably at Riddle's Court. In July 1597 James VI held a lengthy audience with the English ambassador Robert Bowes in Seton's garden.

=== Royal banquets ===
In 1598, two or more banquets were held in the house for Ulrik, Duke of Holstein, the younger brother of Anne of Denmark. Robert Birrell noted the "great solemnity and merryness" at the banquet on 2 May 1598, attended by James VI of Scotland and Anne of Denmark.

Anne of Denmark's Danish cook, Hans Poppilman, was paid £10 Scots. The banquet involved sugar confections and sweetmeats made by a Flemish confectioner, Jacques de Bousie, who was a favourite of the queen. He was paid £184 Scots for sugar works, one of the most costly items on the bill. Wine was sweetened and spiced to make Hippocras by two apothecaries, John Lawtie and John Clavie, and a third apothecary, Alexander Barclay made two pints of "vergeis" and a mutchkin of perfumed rose water.

Tapestries were borrowed from Holyrood Palace. Two French experts, Estienne Pierre and Robert Barbier, arranged the table linen. Ninian MacMorran was compensated for the loss of his best damask napkins during the banquet. Another banquet was held for the Duke of Holstein on 25 May, hosted by the Duke of Lennox, and another hosted by the king on 27 May. Surviving painted decoration may be a remainder of an "ephemeral festive architecture" for the visit of the queen's brother.

=== Patrick Geddes Centre ===
In the mid-18th century Riddle's Court was home to David Hume and he began writing "The History of England" here.

In 1890, the building was restored for use as a university hall of residence by the educationalist and polymath Patrick Geddes, the house is now cared for by the Scottish Historic Buildings Trust (SHBT), and was previously in part used by the Workers' Educational Association and the Architectural Heritage Society of Scotland. The building is now home to the Patrick Geddes Centre for Learning, an educational arm of the SHBT.

Professor Emerita Maureen Meikle gave a public lecture,'Anna of Denmark as Queen of Scots, 1590-1603', at the Patrick Geddes Centre on 30 October 2019.

== External links for Riddle's Court ==
- Michael Cressey, 'Riddle’s Court, Lawnmarket, Edinburgh: a merchant’s house fit for a king, Scottish Archaeological Internet Reports, 102 (2023)
- Riddle’s Court: a merchant's house fit for a king, by Dr Mike Cressey SAS
- RCAHMS Canmore on Riddle's Court
- SHBT on Riddle's Court
- EWHT on Riddle's Court
- The Patrick Geddes Centre at Riddle's Court
