= Alexander Barclay (apothecary) =

Apothecary in Edinburgh, Scotland

Alexander Barclay (fl. 1565–1608) was an apothecary in Edinburgh.

Barclay provided drugs and medicines for the Scottish royal family and their physicians John Naysmyth, Gilbert Primrose, and Martin Schöner.

Barclay was established as an apothecary and burgess of Edinburgh on 20 October 1570. His father George Barclay was also an Edinburgh burgess.

He was appointed apothecary to James VI of Scotland on 7 February 1577 with an annual pension of £50 Scots.

In 1577 he supplied candles, called censer candles, to James VI and his tutor Peter Young.

Barclay also sold sugar confectionery, the family of William Douglas of Lochleven bought boxes of wet and dry confections. These were sometimes consumed for medicinal purposes.

In September 1584 the surgeon Gilbert Primrose was imprisoned in Dumbarton Castle. He was allowed bail or caution for future loyalty at £1,000 Scots, guaranteed by the textile merchant Robert Jousie and Barclay. In 1587, Edinburgh burgh council and the Provost John Arnot challenged exemptions from taxes claimed by some royal servants including the tailors James Inglis and John Murdo, the apothecary Alexander Barclay, the surgeon Gilbert Primrose, the clockmaker Robert Purves, and the goldsmiths Thomas Foulis and John Burrell. Primrose and Barclay represented their case to the Privy Council.

On 10 February 1594 he was appointed to attend Anne of Denmark at Stirling Castle when she gave birth to Prince Henry, with the doctors Martin Schöner, Gilbert Moncreiff, and the surgeon Gilbert Primrose. As apothecary to the king and queen he was rewarded with an exemption from customs duties in 1597.

Edinburgh burgh hosted a banquet for the queen's brother, Ulrik, Duke of Holstein, on 2 May 1598 at the house of Ninian MacMorran at Riddle's court. Wine was sweetened and spiced to make Hippocras by two apothecaries, John Lawtie and John Clavie. Alexander Barclay made two pints of "vergeis" and a mutchkin of perfumed rose water.

He supplied drugs for Princess Margaret to Martin Schöner and materials for her embalming.

In May 1601 he supplied plasters, oil, and liniments to James VI who had hurt his arm, and in the same month provided medicines for Anne of Denmark and Prince Charles.

In November 1602 he was paid £388 Scots for "drugs, oils, unguents, medicaments, and plasters" supplied to the king.

Barclay had apprentices, including Thomas Adamson from Kelso in 1597.

The exact date of his death is uncertain, but it took place before 1608.

One of his predecessors at the Scottish court was John Mosman, who worked for James IV and Margaret Tudor.

== Family ==
Barclay married Janet Auchmowtie who died in 1571. He married secondly, Margaret Henderson. Their children included:

- A daughter who married the academic Henry Charteris.
