= Johannes Sering =

Johannes Sering or Johan Seringius (died 1631) was a chaplain or minister to Anne of Denmark in Scotland and England. He wrote a dedicatory Latin poem for Adrian Damman's Bartasias; de mundi creatione (Edinburgh: Robert Waldegrave, 1600).

== Background ==
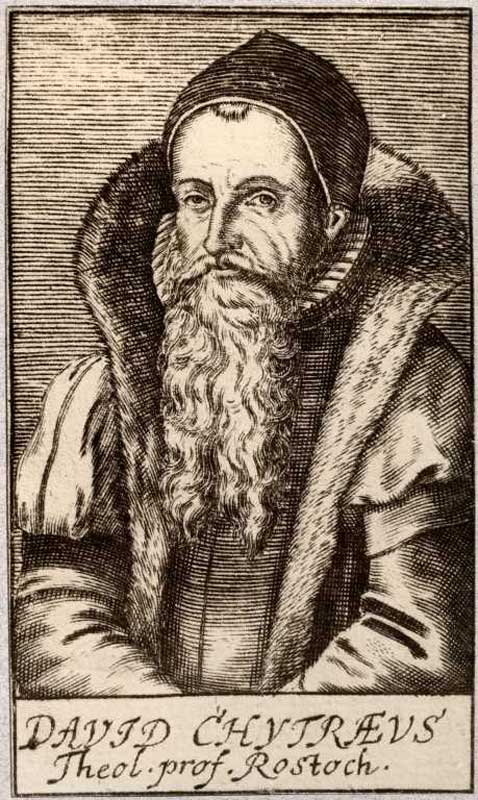
Johannes Sering was a student of David Chytraeus

Sering was a graduate of Rostock University where he had studied under David Chytraeus. His 1585 matriculation record says he was from Thuringia. He was a member of the Lutheran church. He was described as born a subject of the Prince of Weimar (Johann Wilhelm, Duke of Saxe-Weimar) when he became an English citizen in 1607.

== Preacher to the Scottish Queen ==
As part of the negotiations for the marriage of Anne of Denmark and James VI of Scotland the Danish Regency council requested that she was allowed the freedom of religion and worship of her choice, and to keep a preacher at the expense of the Scottish exchequer, and recruit a successor as she wishes. The preacher was to be Danish or German.

Following Anne of Denmark's marriage by proxy to King James on 20 August 1589, a household was established for her in Denmark as the Scottish Queen. The chief lady in waiting or hofmesterinde was Fru Ide Ulfstand, and Johannes Sering was her preacher.

=== Meeting at Oslo ===
After Anne's ships were delayed by contrary winds, James VI of Scotland sailed to Norway to meet her. On 25 November 1589 he had lunch with Sering and his own preacher David Lindsay, as guests of Jens Nilssøn, Bishop of Oslo. James VI interviewed Sering, promising him an annual stipend of 200 dalers and another 40 dalers for the wages of two servants for, "the instruction of our Sovereign lady his highness's dearest spouse in the true religion".

=== Service in Scotland ===
Sering, as the "Dens minister" (Danish preacher), was paid a yearly fee of £600 in three termly installments from the Scottish exchequer. He was given clothes to suit his role, a hat, a gown and cassock of fine London cloth.

David Chrytraeus wrote to Sering in October 1590. Sering may have written frequently to the court of Denmark with news of Scotland and the queen. One of his surviving letters to the Danish council seems to allude to this role.

Though both kingdoms had adopted forms of Protestantism, Denmark was a Lutheran country while Scotland had become Calvinist. Some historians, suggest that Anne of Denmark soon secretly converted to the Catholic faith after coming to Scotland, despite Sering's guiding role, and it has been suggested that Sering converted to Scottish Calvinism. Other historians contend that Anne of Denmark did not convert from the Lutheran faith of her upbringing.

On 25 May 1595 Sering wrote the Council of Denmark, asking if he could leave Scotland and be a church minister in Denmark. He mentioned that the queen now could now speak Scots as fluently as any noblewoman. His pension was confirmed. Sering stayed in the queen's service and came with her to England in 1603.

On 29 May 1597 he was a witness at the baptism of Lucretia, the daughter of a merchant George Littiljohnne and his wife Margaret Purves. The register calls him "Joannes Seringes minister". George Littiljohnne sold hats and dress accessories from a booth in Edinburgh. Sering married Anna Ellis or Ebbes, a Danish servant of the queen on 28 April 1598. The queen paid for their wedding banquet at Holyrood Palace, and the household accounts recorded the day as the wedding of "Hairy Hans" and "Little Anna", a woman of the queen's chamber. The record, written in Scots, states "Hir majesties Minister callit Hairy Hans wes mayit upoun ane woman off hir chalmer Litill Anna this day".

=== In England ===
Sering went to London at the Union of the Crowns with his family. The Duke of Holstein, who visited England in 1605, promised Anna Ebbis she would have an annual pension of £50, but she later had to write a petition for payment.

On 25 July 1607, Sering was granted denization in England, and was described as a subject of the Prince of Weimar.

Little Anna died on 26 February 1608, and was buried at St Margaret's, Westminster, where Sering had a ledger stone placed with a Latin epitaph.

In 1611 he petitioned for the mastership of the hospital of Newport Pagnell, which was part of the queen's jointure. Sering, recorded as the "Dutch chaplain" had a royal annuity of £50 per year from 11 February 1621. In 1622 he sent a petition for payment to the Lord Treasurer, Lionel Cranfield. He received a pension of £80 yearly. In 1626 he wrote a Latin poem for the coronation of Charles I of England to accompany another petition for arrears of his pension.

He died in 1631 and was buried at St Margaret's, Westminster, leaving a widow, Grace.

== Frederick Sering ==
A man called "Frederick Searing" or "Serings", locksmith or turner (carpenter), also appears in lists of the queen's household. In payments of February 1608, he can be linked with George Davies, a coffer maker, and in 1612 was listed as "Frederick, smith". It is unclear if this man was a relation to Johannes Sering.
