= Margaret Stuart (1598–1600) =

Scottish princess (1598–1600)

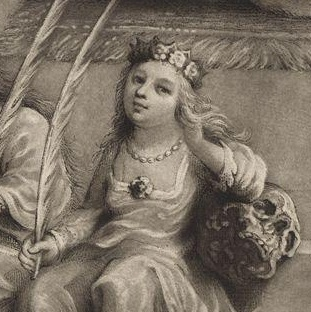
- Depiction in an 1814 mezzotint by Willem van de Passe
- Born: 24 December 1598; Dalkeith Castle, Dalkeith, Scotland
- Died: March 1600 (aged 1); Linlithgow Palace, Linlithgow, Scotland
- Burial: Holyrood Abbey, Edinburgh
- House: Stuart
- Father: James VI and I
- Mother: Anne of Denmark

Margaret Stuart (24 December 1598 – March 1600) was the second daughter of King James VI of Scotland and Anne of Denmark. Sometime in March 1600, Margaret died of an unknown illness and she was buried in Holyrood Abbey. Three years later, her father ascended the throne of England.

== Life ==
Margaret was born at 3:00 am on Christmas Eve 1598, the second daughter of King James VI of Scotland, future James I of England, and Anne of Denmark. She was born at Dalkeith Castle, where the Master of Work, William Schaw, had set carpenters to work to furnish a nursery, with a cradle, a bed, a chair for the nurse, and four stools for the ladies who rocked the cradle. The queen's confinement at Dalkeith commenced on 21 September 1598.

The Countess of Huntly attended the delivery. Margaret Stewart, Mistress of Ochiltree, senior lady in waiting, was in charge of Margaret's care.

=== Baptism at Holyrood Palace ===
Margaret's baptism was postponed until 15 April 1599, as the winter, part of the "Little Ice Age", was exceptionally cold and there were worries that the princess should catch a cold and expire. King James VI wrote letters to his nobles and lairds, inviting them to the baptism, and asking for contributions. This letter was sent to Robert Bethune, laird of Balfour in Fife, from Holyrood Palace on 10 February 1598:

"We greet you well: having appointed the baptism of our dearest daughter to be here at Holyrood House, upon Sunday, the fiftenth of April next, in such honorable manner as that action craved: we have therefore though good right effectually to request and desire you to send us such propynes and presents against that day, as is best then in season and convenient for that action, as you regard our honour and will merit our special thanks. So, not doubting to find your greater willingness to pleasure us herein, since you are to be invited to take part of you own good cheer, we commit you to God."

Although such letters were not unusual on these occasions, the circumstances were exceptional, because a faction of bedchamber courtiers had displaced the royal treasurer, Walter Stewart of Blantyre, and instead George Home, George Elphinstone, Robert Melville younger, and David Murray pledged money for the celebrations. James paid £400 Scots for clothes made by the tailor Peter Sanderson for Margaret and her sister Elizabeth to wear at the baptism. The celebrations at Holyroodhouse involved feasting, dancing, and tournament games called "running at the ring" and "running at the glove". The guests included the Duke of Lennox, the Earl of Huntly, the Earl of Mar, and the Chancellor.

=== Linlithgow Palace ===
After the baptism, Margaret and her sister were put into the care of Lord Livingston and his wife Lady Livingston at Linlithgow Palace. Helena Crichton was her wet nurse. Christian Scrimgeour and Marion Hepburn rocked her cradle. Marion Bog washed her linen, and Thomas Burnett supplied butter and sugar candy.

== Death and burial ==
In March 1600, Margaret was taken ill, but her disease is not known. Alexander Barclay, apothecary, and the German physician Martin Schöner were called to "supply certain drugs, medicaments, and other gear, for the use of the Lady Margaret, during the time of her sickness" and assist the infant, but to no avail. Margaret died sometime during the very same month she became ill, but the exact date was never recorded. Later in March, she was embalmed, her body was decorated with flannel, crimson silk and Florence ribbon, to prepare her for the funeral. She was transported from Linlithgow to Edinburgh and was privately interred in Holyrood Abbey.
