= Gilbert Primrose (surgeon) =

Scottish surgeon

- Mural monument at the tomb of Gilbert Primrose in Greyfriars Churchyard, Edinburgh
- Born: c.1535 Culross, Scotland
- Died: 18 April 1616; Westminster, England
- Occupation: Surgeon

Gilbert Primrose (c.1535 – 18 April 1616) was a Scottish surgeon who became Surgeon to King James VI of Scots and moved with the court to London as Serjeant-Surgeon to King James VI and I on the Union of the Crowns. He was Deacon of the Incorporation of Surgeons and Barbers of Edinburgh on three occasions.

== Early life and education ==
Gilbert Primrose was born c.1540, at Culross, Fife, Scotland. He was the son of Duncan Primrose and Helen Smyth, whose niece, Euphan Primrose, married Sir George Bruce, from whom the Earls of Rosebery are descended. On 6 June 1558 he was admitted to the Incorporation of Surgeons and Barbers of Edinburgh as apprentice to Robert Henrysoun, one of the founder members of the Incorporation.

== Career ==
In 1558 Scotland was threatened by an invasion from "the auld inemies of Ingland", the Edinburgh craft guilds were required to list those men who could be mustered in the event of an attack and Primrose was included. In September 1575 Regent Morton sent him to Coldingham to mend the broken leg of the messenger Ninian Cockburn.

In March 1580 Primrose was one of a number of Edinburgh surgeons who examined and treated Robert Aslowane, the victim of an assault by James Douglas of Parkhead and his accomplices. When the surgeons declared that Aslowane was likely to recover, the burgh council released Parkhead and his followers.

In September 1584 he was imprisoned in Dumbarton Castle. He was allowed bail or caution for future loyalty at £1,000 Scots, guaranteed by the textile merchant Robert Jousie and the apothecary Alexander Barclay.

Primrose went on to become Surgeon to King James VI. In 1587, Edinburgh burgh council and the Provost John Arnot challenged exemptions from taxes claimed by some royal servants including the tailors James Inglis and John Murdo, the apothecary Alexander Barclay, the surgeon Gilbert Primrose, the clockmaker Robert Purves, and the goldsmiths Thomas Foulis and John Burrell. Primrose and Barclay represented their case to the Privy Council.

In June 1592 the Earl of Angus was injured falling from his horse and sent for Primrose. On 10 February 1594 he was appointed to attend Anne of Denmark at Stirling Castle, when she gave birth to Prince Henry, with the physicians Martin Schöner and Gilbert Moncreiff, Alexander Barclay, and the midwife.

He was a friend of Dr Peter Lowe, the co-founder of the Faculty of Physicians and Surgeons of Glasgow, who dedicated the first edition (1597) of his surgical textbook The Whole course of Chirurgerie (which was renamed Discourse of the Whole Art of Chirurgerie for the 2nd and 3rd editions) to Gilbert Primrose. Pimrose was elected Deacon of the Incorporation of Surgeons and Barbers on no fewer than three occasions. Whilst he was Deacon in 1581 the Surgeons became first in the order of precedence of the 14 crafts of the City of Edinburgh. When he was elected Deacon for the third time in 1602 his status was such that he was able to impose considerable discipline on the Incorporation. Under his leadership all members of the Incorporation swore that they would uphold all aspects of the Seal of Cause (the Charter of the Incorporation) and any violations were punished. Primrose was also responsible for passing new Laws which sought to maintain even higher standards within the craft. Admission and examination fees were established and each member of the Incorporation was required to pay a subscription. The Incorporation thrived under his leadership.

On 30 April 1597 his mother Helen Smith, over 80 years old and blind, was assaulted and robbed in her house at Culross.

As principal surgeon to King James VI he accompanied the Court to London on the Union of the Crowns in 1603. He became Serjeant-Surgeon or chief surgeon to the King, now James VI and I and Queen Anne.

== First name on Fellows’ Roll ==
Whilst the names of the earliest members of the Incorporation appear in the Edinburgh Burgh records, the assignation of a roll number for Members and Fellows starts from 1581 when the Deacon of the Incorporation was Gilbert Primrose. His name is first in the Roll of Fellows which has continued in an uninterrupted sequence ever since.

Repilca of Gilbert Primrose's mortar in Surgeons' Hall Museum, Edinburgh

== Primrose’s mortar ==
Surgeons’ Hall Museum has a treasured relic of Gilbert Primrose. It is labelled "a replica of the mortar used by Gilbert Primrose, an ancestor of the Earl of Rosebery and a Deacon of the Chirurgeon-Barbers in 1581". This mortar was presented to the College by Archibald Primrose, 5th Earl of Rosebery, a descendant of Gilbert Primrose in December 1909. The original is held in the National Museums of Scotland.

== Family ==
His brother Archibald Primrose became 1st Laird of Burnbrae. Other brothers included David Primrose, Henry Primrose, Duncan Primrose and Peter Primrose.

He married Alison Graham. Their children included:

- Gilbert Primrose (c. 1580–1641) who became a Calvinist pastor.
- Marion Primrose (1566-1637), who married Alexander Clark of Balbirnie.
- David Primrose.
- Robert Primrose.

== Death ==
Gilbert Primrose died in Westminster, London on 18 April 1616 and was buried in Greyfriars Churchyard, Edinburgh where his monument still stands. His grave carries a Latin inscription translated as:

To Gilbert Primrose, Chief Surgeon to James and Anne, King and Queen of Great Britain, France and Ireland. His heirs erected this monument. He lived happily 80 years. To the end of his life he was Chief Surgeon to the King, and died, adorned with testimonials of public sorrow from Prince and people, in the year of our Lord 1616 on the 8th of April.

Great Gilbert Primrose shut his mortal eyes

Full fraught with honours as with length of days

My will and life to Christ I still resign'd

Hence neither life nor death did bitter find

Detail of inscription on mural monument at the tomb of Gilbert Primrose in Greyfriars Churchyard, Edinburgh
