= Ulrik of Denmark (1578–1624) =

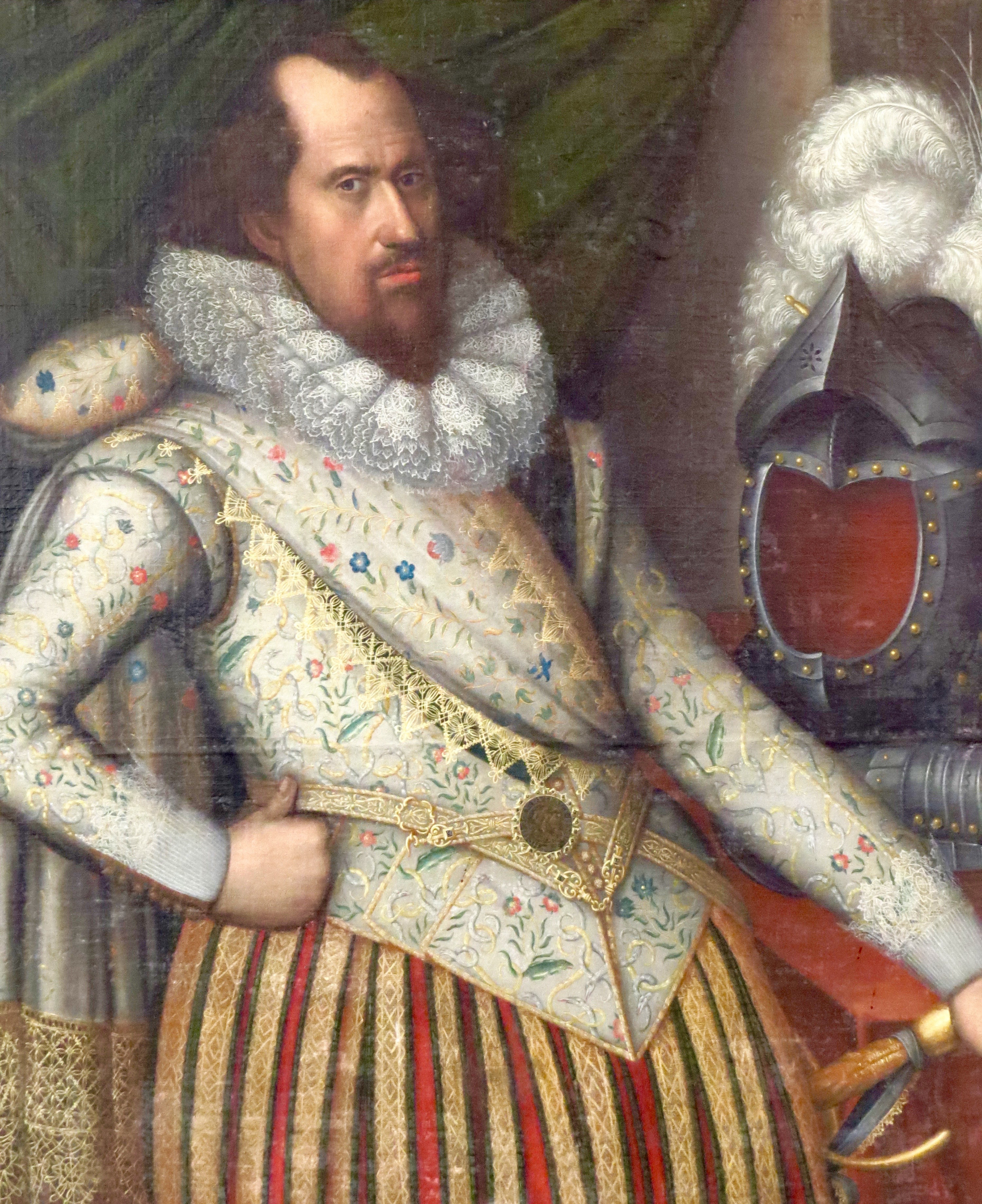

Prince-Bishop of Schwerin
- Reign: 1603–1624
- Predecessor: Ulrich I
- Successor: Ulrich III
- Born: 30 December 1578; Koldinghus Palace, Kolding
- Died: 27 March 1624 (aged 45); Rühn
- Burial: Roskilde Cathedral, Roskilde
- House: House of Oldenburg
- Father: Frederick II of Denmark
- Mother: Sophie of Mecklenburg-Güstrow
- Religion: Lutheran

Prince Ulrik John of Denmark, (Koldinghus Palace, Kolding, 30 December 1578 – 27 March 1624, Rühn) was a son of King Frederick II of Denmark and his consort, Sophie of Mecklenburg-Güstrow. As the second-born son he bore the merely titular rank of Duke of Holstein and Schleswig, Stormarn and Ditmarsh and had no share in the royal-ducal condominial rule of Holstein and Schleswig, wielded by the heads of the houses of Oldenburg (royal) and its cadet branch Holstein-Gottorp (ducal). Since 1602 he held the religiously defunct position of Bishop of Schleswig, enjoying the revenues of the implied estates and manor. The year after he succeeded his grandfather as Administrator of the Prince-Bishopric of Schwerin, holding both posts until his death.

== Education and efforts to provide Ulrik a princely sustenance ==
As a small child his parents sent Ulrik to his maternal grandparents Ulrich, Duke of Mecklenburg and his consort Duchess Elizabeth of Denmark. In 1583 he had returned to Denmark and was tutored by the prestigious school teacher and former rector of Roskilde, M. Poul Pedersen, since 1584. In the following years Ulrik stayed partly at Kalundborg castle or at Sorø Abbey, or he accompanied his parents on their journeys in Denmark.

Until his death in 1588 his father Frederick II wielded his influence in order to provide his second-born Ulrik with prebendaries within the Holy Roman Empire, such as a canonicate at the Minster of Straßburg (Strasbourg), or the post of administrator in a Lutheran-ruled prince-bishopric. But these plans did not materialise.

The Danish Queen dowager Sophie of Mecklenburg-Güstrow, daughter of Duke Ulrich of Mecklenburg, ruling the Prince-Bishopric of Schwerin as Lutheran administrator as Ulrich I, considered the prince-bishopric as a good sustenance for her son Ulrik.

This seemed easy as long as her father ruled in the prince-bishopric and could wield all his influence for his grandson. When in 1590 Sophie and Ulrich met in Wolfenbüttel on the wedding of their (grand)daughter Elisabeth, she gained his promise to provide Ulrik with the succession in the prince-bishopric. To this end Ulrich was to effect the chapter electing his grandson as coadjutor, a function usually including the succession to the see.

On 25 August 1590 Sophie promised her father, that she would renounce for her son, if he should beget a son of his own with his second wife Anna of Pomerania-Wolgast. To cathedral provost Heinrich von der Lühe she promised that as long as Ulrich I will be alive her son the to-be-elected coadjutor would not demand any appanage further charging the revenues of the prince-bishopric. Sophie offered to agree to wider ranging conditions and promised to provide her son with an education suited for an administrator.

The chapter was satisfied, it even the more leant on the side of a Danish prince, because his reign would more likely prevent an annexation of the prince-bishopric than a Nikloting prince, who would simultaneously rule the neighbouring Duchy of Mecklenburg. Therefore, the capitular canons decided to speak on the matter on the next diet of the prince-bishopric on 1 September 1590.

Ulrich claimed a greater right of his House of Nikloting to provide a candidate, however, the chapter insisted on its privilege to freely elect the administrator, but was not averse to choosing an indigenous prince accepted by the ducal family.

Administrator Ulrich meanwhile regretted his Wolfenbüttel promise but gave in to the pressurising by his daughter and the chapter. On 24 September 1590 the capitulars decided to elect the Danish Prince Ulrik, grandson of Administrator Ulrich, if he undertook to sign an election capitulation as was the usage in the prince-bishopric. They right away informed Ulrich on their decision.

Administrator Ulrich I replied on the same date, that Ulrik should guarantee in his election capitulation, that (1) at the future election of Ulrik's successor a member of the ducal family should prevail, that (2) during Ulrich's lifetime Ulrik will waive any claim to the revenues of the prince-bishopric, and that (3) he will renounce if Ulrich will be born a son. While the chapter only accepted the second claim, Queen dowager Sophie on the other hand approved all three points.

In 1590 Ulrik had started his travels and studies abroad, he first visited his aunt Elisabeth and uncle Henry Julius of the Brunswick and Lunenburgian Principality of Wolfenbüttel and studied at the ducal Julius University of Helmstedt. Ulrik agreed upon the conditions accepted by his mother. From Helmstedt he wrote his grandfather that he was very pleased about the progress of the election, assuring him he would continue his studies so that his grandfather "should have a common pleasure and rejoicing thereof."

The Ulrich's Chancellor Jacob Bording and the capitular Dean Otto Wackerbarth conceptualised the election capitulation, comparable to those signed by the administrators of the prince-bishoprics of Bremen, Lübeck, and Ratzeburg. On 12 December 1590 they presented the draft to Ulrich I, who disliked it and negotiations began anew. An improved version was issued on 13 January 1591. Now the main difficulty was that Ulrich and Sophie should guarantee for the minor Ulrik to sign the capitulation when coming of age. The chapter further demanded that the new administrator would effect that the chapter will be enfeoffed with the villages of Uelitz and Wichmannsdorf within its territory, which King Frederick II had sold as part of the secularised Holsatian Monastery of Reinfeld in 1565.

In a treaty signed in Boizenburg on 27 April 1591, Ulrich I and Sophie guaranteed the chapter, represented by Wackerbarth, meanwhile having succeeded von der Lühe as provost, that Ulrik would sign the election capitulation of 1591 when coming of age in 1596. Further Ulrich I and Sophie committed themselves to help the chapter achieving the aforementioned villages and agreed, that in case Ulrich I would die before Ulrik's majority, that not his eventual guardian, but the Schwerin chapter will rule the prince-bishopric.

The chapter then postulated Ulrik as coadjutor and Ulrich I sent his daughter a copy of the writ recording it (documentum postulationis) on 7 May 1591 with Sophie testifying its reception on 15 May.

The next concern was to obtain an imperial confirmation for Ulrik's coadjutorship, the prior usual papal confirmation as bishop was anyway forlorn with Ulrik being a Lutheran and therefore not searched for. Ulrich I advised his daughter, that an imperial confirmation cannot be reached without douceur.

Ulrik meanwhile continued his studies at Rostock University in 1593 achieving the academic title Rector Magnificus, before he went on to the University of Leipzig in 1595. The chapter still aimed at nailing Ulrich I and Sophie down on providing the chapter with the aforementioned villages, as recorded by a letter to Ulrich I on 23 December 1595.

Furthermore, Coadjutor Ulrik and the chapter now demanded that the prince-bishopric will be excluded from the jurisdiction of last resort of the Duchy of Mecklenburg. Therefore, Sophie sent a delegation consisting of Hans Blume, Dr. Ludwig Pinziers and Apitz von Grunenberg for negotiations in Bützow. On 7 December 1595 the Danes arrived and two days later negotiations started with Provost Wackerbarth, Dean Ludolf von Schack and canon Joachim von Bassewitz, who brought as their legal adviser Dr. Daniel Zöllner from Lübeck and Dr. Nordanus from Rostock.

Ulrich I in his function as Duke of Mecklenburg-Güstrow and his ducal councillors refused, fearing to lose any say in the prince-bishopric and its complete alienation as estate under Nikloting influence. The negotiations ended without result, and the Danish emissaries returned empty-handed.

So Ulrik, worried about his sustenance, claimed an actual rule in the Duchies of Holstein and Schleswig, however, giving rise to strong tensions between him and his elder brother, the still minor King Christian IV of Denmark. In 1595, when Ulrik stayed with his grandfather Ulrich in Mecklenburg-Güstrow, Christian invited him to Nyköping Castle, where they reconciled. Ulrik attended Christian's coronation in 1596, who elevated him to rank of equerry, however, Ulrik left Denmark again. In the following year, he followed Christian IV on his trip to the Holy Roman Empire, then travelling to France and England.

== Travels in England and Scotland ==
=== Scotland in 1598 ===
In 1597 the Duke travelled in France, and then came through England to Scotland incognito (as a private traveller rather than as a diplomat) to meet his sister Anne, Queen of Scotland. Little is known of his travels in France, but a letter from James VI to Christian IV mentions that Ulrik had stayed a year in France. James VI was informed of his travel plans by a letter from Andrew Sinclair, a Scottish resident at the Danish court. Ulrik arrived in Edinburgh on 14 March 1598, and first made himself known to David Cunningham of Robertland, a courtier of the queen who had formerly been exiled in Denmark. He went hunting with James VI at Dalmahoy near Edinburgh on 18 March.

News of his arrival, the feasting, entertainments, and his travels in Scotland with James VI spread to Berwick-upon-Tweed in England, where there was some doubt if the honoured guest was Ulrik or his brother Christian IV. His sojourn included a trip to Perth in April and a tour of the coastal towns of Fife and Dundee with William Schaw the founder of freemasonry, sailing to Dysart for a visit to Ravenscraig Castle, then to Anstruther and Balcomie, taking a boat to St Andrews and on 3 May dinner at Fowlis Castle. On his return there were banquets at Holyrood Palace and in John MacMorran's house in Riddle's court in Edinburgh, which included sugar works made by Jacques de Bousie. Surviving painted decoration in MacMorran's house may date from this occasion. There were English comedians in Edinburgh at this time, but their performance was condemned by the former Provost, John Arnot.

Ulrik also visited the fortress on Bass Rock, accompanied by William Schaw. Several Scottish nobles made excuses not to come to the banquet for Ulrik held by the king. Ulrik made it known that he did want not guests to toast Elizabeth's health. Roger Aston wrote "the god Bacchus is a great guider among us at this time. Her majesty's good health will not be drunken here. The Duke will not hear of that." Aston reported curses and complaints about the waste of up to £4000 spent on his entertainment. James gave him a jewelled hatband and other gold, jewels, and horses. When his ship sailed from Leith on 3 June 1598 he was saluted by 60 cannon shot from the bulwark fortification on the shore.

It was secretly planned that when the Duke left Scotland he would be accompanied with Scottish ambassadors on a mission to Denmark and Germany to promote James' title to the English crown after the death of Queen Elizabeth and secure promises of military support. Ulrik sailed with William Stewart, who was sent as ambassador to Denmark. Michael Balfour accompanied them.

=== London ===
After Anne became Queen of England, Ulrik came to London in November 1604. He was met at Dover by Henry Onlie. Sir Lewes Lewknor was appointed to attend him, and then a group of the king's ushers and servers. The city of Canterbury hired an interpreter when he visited. According to the Venetian ambassador, Nicolò Molin, he quickly alienated the diplomatic community, by not showing usual courtesy to the ambassadors and criticising the relations of King James and Spain. On 12/22 November he told James that the Spanish peace was a mistake. Molin noted that Ulrik was 24 years old and "without much knowledge of the world". When the Spanish ambassador pointed out that Ulrik was a private gentleman in England, Ulrik apologised in French which led to further misunderstanding.

One day in December 1604, Ulrik decided to visit his sister in Whitehall Palace. Thomas Somerset, the Queen's master of horse, and the Master of Orkney and other gentlemen accompanied him to walk the Queen's apartments, and as they were at the door of her Privy Chamber, Somerset and the Master of Orkney accused each other of pushing and shoving. The two gentlemen fought later in the day at the Ballon Court at the palace. The Master of Orkney was confined to his chamber and Somerset was sent to the Fleet Prison.

=== Wedding etiquette ===
At the wedding of Philip Herbert and Susan de Vere on St John's day, 27 December 1604, Ulrik escorted the bride into church with his nephew, Prince Henry. He upset Nicolo Molin again when he sat in the Venetian's place of honour opposite Prince Henry at the wedding of Philip Herbert and Susan de Vere. Molin felt that Ulrik, who had also missed his supper, made up for this by standing hatless in the royal box during the three-hour masque and ballet that finished off the evening. A week after the wedding, on Twelfth Night, Prince Charles was made Duke of York and Ulrik attended the entertainment arranged by his sister, Inigo Jones and Ben Jonson's Masque of Blacknesse.

=== Love's Labour's Lost and the Red Bull Theatre ===
The actor Richard Burbage arranged a revival of Shakespeare's Love's Labour's Lost for Ulrik and Anne in January 1605, performed either at the house of Robert Cecil or Henry, Earl of Southampton. The day after the Masque on Twelfth Night, or the next day, Ulrik went with the court to a dinner given by the Spanish ambassador where the service was arranged in the Dutch manner with streamers, and the ladies were given presents of gloves and fans. On the same day, after this feast, the Spanish ambassador was entertained by another banquet and another play performed at Court.

Ulrik also tried to form a theatre company of his own, led by the actor Martin Slater, who had been in Scotland in 1599 with Lawrence Fletcher and may have met Holstein there (or more likely in London in 1597). Slater and Aaron Holland planned to convert stables forming a square courtyard of an inn into a new theatre, by adding galleries. The site was the Red Bull in St John Street Clerkenwell. The Privy Council prevented them, and Slater wrote a petition for permission to finish the work.

The historian Leeds Barroll suggests that the building project was stalled as a slight to the Duke but Eva Griffiths argues that the problem was a new requirement to build in brick. The playhouse was completed two years later for the Queen's Men.

=== Criticism ===
In December and March Ulrik followed the King's hunting at Royston, with the master hunter Thomas Pott. In London Ulrik lodged at Court with Thomas Sackville the Lord Treasurer, and his followers stayed with the Earl of Derby. Probably in February 1605, King James thought of bringing Princess Elizabeth from Coombe Abbey to Greenwich Palace to meet Ulrik. The Privy Council wrote to the courtier Roger Aston that Anne of Denmark had suggested delaying this, because the hall used for plays and masques had collapsed and she herself was pregnant, (with Princess Mary). Anne of Denmark concluded that Ulrik might as well ride to the country to see Elizabeth.

Ulrik was planning to ride at tournaments and tilting, and took part in practices. His horse threw him. Dudley Carleton wrote that the horse had laid his "little burden on God's fair earth". The tournament took place in March 1605. Ulrik and the Duke of Lennox were outran by the English competitors. A spectator, Samuel Calvert, criticised the lack of 'solemnity' and costly shows. Two Germans took part, Wolf Henry von Gantteratt and Hans Cristofer von Tsedlyte.

On two days in April 1605, Ulrik and King James went hunting at Marylebone Park. The usher Richard Coningsby and his team were paid for making Whitehall Palace for their return. In May 1605, Ulrik was given robes of crimson velvet to wear at the installation of Knights of the Garter. Ulrik's relative lack of wealth was noted by Lord Lumley who heard that Ulrik was a 'comely,' handsome man.

=== Christening ===
On 5 May 1605 Ulrik was a godfather at the christening of Anne's daughter, Princess Mary, at Greenwich Palace, Arbella Stuart was a godmother. On 13 May Lord Stanhope saw him playing cards with the king on the royal barge on the Thames. On 16 May, St George's day, he was made a knight of the Order of the Garter at Windsor Castle. On Whitsunday, 19 May, Ulrik attended his sister at the Churching ceremony which followed her pregnancy.

Ulrik and the Earl of Northampton were made Knights of the Garter. The Venetian ambassador heard that King James gave him an income of £3,000 yearly and his visit had so far cost 80,000 crowns.

After enjoying a banquet of Ypocras wine and cake at Canterbury, Ulrik left England from Rochester on 1 June. It was said that he had been trying to raise soldiers to fight in Hungary, though John Chamberlain thought they would not achieve much, "with a Man able to do them no more good," referring to Ulrik's lack of funds. Ulrik got a parting gift of £4000. Molin heard that while Ulrik had enjoyed himself, he had upset everyone including his sister Anne. Molin wrote that the Queen would not speak to her younger brother for two months because she felt Ulrik had presumed too much to have free unimpeded access to her state apartments. Ulrik had suggested he would stay for the stag-hunting, and when James I did not reply, Ulrik realised it was time to go.

Ulrik obtained a royal pension on 27 May 1605. He promised "Little Anna", Anna Ebbis, the Danish wife of the queen's preacher Johannes Sering that she would have an annual pension of £50, but she had trouble getting any payment. He embarked in Captain Matthew Bredgate's ship the Adventure with Robert Anstruther and sailed to Hamburg, arriving on 9 June 1605. He wrote a thank you letter from Hamburgh to the Earl of Salisbury.

== Ulrik's election capitulation as future administrator of Schwerin See ==
Sophie and the chapter continued their efforts to conclude the Schwerin deal and this finally led to the election capitulation issued by the chapter assembly in the prince-episcopal castle on 19 February 1597. Ulrik, his brother Christian IV and his grandfather Ulrich I signed and sealed this election capitulation, stipulating the following:

1. Ulrik will aim at an imperial confirmation on his own expense.
2. If Ulrik fails to obtain his confirmation the chapter may elect another administrator.
3. Ulrik will accept that the chapter does not consider any hereditary claims to the see.
4. As long as Ulrich I is still alive, Ulrik will only be coadjutor.
5. Ulrik will prevent any incorporation of the prince-bishopric into the Danish realm.
6. Ulrik will take care for good pastoring and school education in the parishes with well trained ministers and teachers, honouring the treaty between the chapter and Ulrich I concluded on 21 February 1568.
7. Ulrik will assure good governance of justice.
8. Ulrik will maintain the regalia and dignities of the prince-bishopric, particularly its privilege to staff the chancellor of the University of Rostock.
9. Ulrik guarantees to feed at least twelve poor daily from the prince-episcopal kitchen in Bützow.
10. Ulrik will rule himself and only appoint a vicar after prior information of the chapter, in case of sede vacante all prince-episcopal officials will be responsible to the chapter.
11. Therefore, all civil servants and subjects of the prince-bishopric will have to commit themselves to the chapter as alternative government on Ulrik's accession as administrator.
12. Ulrik will maintain all prince-episcopal castles and fortresses in good shape and man them in case of war.
13. Ulrik will name two stewards committed to the chapter to rule on his eventual absence.
14. Ulrik will host capitulars and prince-episcopal subjects, eventually violently expelled from their possessions by foreigners, in his castles and fortresses.
15. Ulrik will protect church and chapter in their freedoms and privileges.
16. Ulrik will not interfere in the chapter's jurisdiction over the capitulars, prelates, beneficiaries, ecclesiastical manors, servants and subjects.
17. Ulrik guarantees the chapter's free election of its provost and dean and its free disposing of the prebendaries.
18. When Ulrich convenes the capitulars in matters of the chapter, he will board them.
19. Ulrik will lodge the capitulars on Ravensburg castle, when they are in Bützow in official matters.
20. Ulrik will not pursue unreasonable cases of third parties against the chapter.
21. The chapter may imprison wrong-doers in its jail, the tower of Warin Monastery, and guarantees quick interrogation.
22. Ulrik will consult in all major affairs of the prince-bishopric with the chapter, and will not charge any tax on the prince-episcopal subjects without the chapter's advice and will not hold diets without the presence of the chapter.
23. Ulrik will not charge the prince-bishopric with expenses for abnormal events.
24. Ulrik will protect the rights and boundaries within the prince-bishopric and will not tolerate any alienation of prince-episcopal territory.
25. If prince-episcopal estates are to be sold or pledged as collateral for credits in order to raise necessary funds, the administrator will be ranked first in his right to preempt, followed by the chapter, and each individual capitular.
26. Ulrik must not exchange, cease or leave the prince-bishopric without the consent of the chapter.
27. Ulrik will set up an inventory of the treasuries and deeds of the prince-bishopric in co-operation with the chapter.
28. The chapter will preserve its seal and letters on its own.
29. If gold and silver furnishings are to be refurbished the crests of the administrator are to fixed on them besides the crest of the prince-bishopric.
30. Ulrik will use savings of revenues of the prince-bishopric to purchase estates in the area or to invest them in interest-bearing titles.
31. Ulrik will not challenge legitimate wills of the canons and other inhabitants of the prince-bishopric.
32. Ulrik will abide all lawful contracts of the administrators.
33. Ulrik will delegate representatives to all diets of the Holy Roman Empire or the Lower Saxon Circle or other conventions, to which the prince-bishopric will be invited, and - together with the chapter - he will defray all expenses thereof, as well as those incurred by visits and lawsuits in the Imperial Chamber Court.
34. Upon the chapter's request Ulrik will offend all unlawful attacks on chapter estates.
35. Ulrik will take his effort to provide the chapter with confirmations of its freedoms and privileges by the emperor, as used to be case until Emperor Charles V, however, since then no longer.
36. Ulrik will not restrict the cathedral chapter in regard of fulfilling its treatises with the ducal Mecklenburgian House of Nikloting as to electing members of that house for future positions.
37. Ulrik will in no way and by nobody provide himself with a suspension of these commitments.

The chapter had dropped (1) to demand its enfeoffment with Uelitz and Wichmannsdorf, (2) to oblige Ulrik to run brickworks in order to repair the Schwerin Cathedral, and (3) to absolve the civil servants of the prince-bishopric from obeying the administrator in case of his breach of the election capitulation.

== The years before ascending as administrator ==
1599 Ulrik returned home again, served again as equerry and escorted the King on his well-known expedition to the North Cape. On a stay in Bergen he socialised with Mette Høg, the notorious wife of the Seignory Jakob Trolle. In 1601 Ulrik stayed with Christian at Bohus (Båhus) Fortress and 1602 with him in Knærød (Knäred).

In the same year he escorted his sister Hedwig of Denmark with a horsemen squadron on her way to her wedding with Christian II, Elector of Saxony in Dresden. In question of Ulrik's claims to a rule in Holstein and Schleswig Christian concluded with the Rigsraadet in 1602 to enfeoff Ulrik for 15 years with the manor and estates of the Bishop of Schleswig in Svavsted (Schwabstedt). Ulrik was greatly discontent and tried to get their mother Sophie to affect Christian in his favour.

== As Administrator Ulrich II of Schwerin ==
When Ulrik's grandfather Administrator Ulrich I died on 14 March 1603 without a male heir a letter was sent to Ulrik the next day requesting his accession as administrator. The commander-in-chief of the prince-bishopric Wedige von Leisten took the prince-episcopal castles, fortresses and armoury into custody and sealed the private rooms of the deceased administrator. Representatives of the inhabitants were convened to render their homage to the chapter.

On 27 March the chapter, gathered in Bützow, addressed Ulrik to take up the administration, and the next day Provost Joachim von Bassewitz travelled to Ulrich I's daughter the Danish Queen dowager Sophie, who then stayed in Güstrow, to orally negotiate the affairs of the prince-bishopric, the funeral of Ulrich I and to forward the chapter's letter to her son Ulrik (29 March). In addition, the provost demanded to return the inventory list of all estates of the prince-bishopric and the chapter, which Ulrich I had earlier taken to his residence in Bützow. Sophie replied on 30 March that her son Ulrik had informed her that he is on his way from Denmark and would arrive within a few days.

On 30 March Ulrik himself wrote from Copenhagen to Charles I, Duke of Mecklenburg-Güstrow, Ulrich I's successor as duke, that he had received the news and would arrive about 6 April in order to attend the funeral of his grandfather scheduled for 14 April.

After representatives of the inhabitants of the prince-bishopric rendered him homage Ulrik assumed the title Ulrich of God's grace, heir of Norway, Duke of Schleswig-Holstein, Stormarn and the Ditmarshes, Administrator of the Prince-Bishopric of Schwerin, Count of Oldenburg and Delmenhorst. From then on he mostly resided in the prince-episcopal residence in Bützow. However, he further pursued to gain a decent appanage from Denmark. So in 1610 - with the help of his mother - he received the Schleswig episcopal Svavsted manor and estates for life and additionally a sum of money.

Ulrich II's rule is fundamentally different from that of his grandfather. While the grandfather as the reigning Duke of Mecklenburg regarded the small prince-bishopric of Schwerin as an appendix, which he liked to incorporate or convert into a permanent appanage for princes of Mecklenburg, his grandson had no other territory than this and therefore eagerly looked after preserving as much independence as possible.

From the beginning Ulrich II, therefore, sought to emancipate his prince-bishopric from its powerful neighbour Mecklenburg. Ulrich II established his own court in Bützow castle and appointed government for the prince-bishopric separate from that of the Duchy of Mecklenburg-Güstrow. Either in 1603 but definitely before 1605 he appointed Dr. Erasmus Reutze as chancellor, who had been a ducal councillor of his grandfather since 1597. Most likely in 1605 Ulrich II joined Emperor Rudolph II's service in order to participate in the Long War against the Ottoman Turks. Before returning to Bützow Ulrich II stayed some time with his sister Anne, Queen consort of Scotland and England in 1605/1606, where he had gained so much recognition that he had been decorated with the Order of the Garter, and his brother-in-law Elector Christian II had appointed him steward in Saxony in 1607.

In 1612 Ulrich II embarked with Christian in the Danish fleet during the Kalmar War. In December 1616 Ulrich II attended the enfeoffment of his paternal nephew, Frederick of Holstein-Gottorp, as Duke of Schleswig (ducal share) in Kolding.

In 1617, after Reutze's death, Ulrich II appointed Chancellor Dr. Heinrich Stallmeister, formerly burgomaster of Rostock, who still held the office under Administrator Ulrich III until their expulsion by Wallenstein in 1628. The chancellor was assisted by the councillors Otto von Grunenberg and Dr. Theodor Bussius. Ulrich II established a supreme court for the prince-bishopric circumventing the prior usual appeal at the court of justice of Mecklenburg.

Ulrich II kept the other officials and only appointed new men - usually indigenous people - for eventual vacancies. The treasurer of the prince-bishopric was Rent-Master Daniel Troie, later under the Swedes he officiated as custodian of the estates of Zibühl and Gallentin (near Bad Kleinen). Ulrich II's privy secretary was Peter Hennichow (as of 1620).

It is uncertain when Ulrich II married Catherine Hahn-Hinrichshagen (bef. 1598– after 1631), eldest daughter of Otto II Hahn-Hinrichshagen and Brigitte von Trotha von Krosigk und Wettin. While Lisch considers their marriage proven, Schildt doubts that they ever had been officially wedded. It is also uncertain if Ulrik ever received the 30,000 rixdollars, whose payment Christian IV had ratified, as a dower for Hahn. Undoubted is, that Christian had committed himself to the payment, since the respective ratified writ, proving that, played a role in a lawsuit in 1628.

Ulrich II further endowed Hahn with the manor and estates of Zibühl (a part of today's Dreetz in Mecklenburg) as her allodial dower, which he had bought for 17,000 rixdollars in 1621, charging up 5,000 rixdollar against her monetary dower of 30,000 rixdollar. After a rebuild and furnishing, including the fixture of her and his coat-of-arms on the outside, Hahn had moved in.

On 27 March 1624 Ulrich II suddenly died on his estate in Rühn. His mother Sophie, his sisters Elisabeth, Duchess dowager of Wolfenbüttel and Augusta, Duchess dowager of ducal Holstein and Schleswig, as well as his nephews Ulrik, the future administrator Ulrich III, and Christian, and Adolf Frederick I, Duke of Mecklenburg including all their entourages attended Ulrich II's funeral in the Collegiate Church of Ss. Mary, John and Elisabeth of Hungary in Bützow on 27 March 1624.

Sophie and Ulrich III challenged Ulrich II's widow's dower and claimed it for himself. Therefore, they de facto dispossessed Hahn including her chattels. She later married Nicolaus Herman von Nidrum.

On 16 December 1628, after Wallenstein gained the reign in Mecklenburg and the prince-bishopric, Hahn sued Ulrich III in the Ducal Court and Land Tribunal of Mecklenburg. Due to the changing fortunes of war the tribunal never rendered a verdict. Christian IV organised the exhumation of Ulrich II's mortal remains, which were then translated to Roskilde Cathedral in 1642.

== Characterisation of Ulrik ==
We know little on Ulrich II's character. In his youth Ulrik was praised in particular for his knowledge and education, and he seems to have had some literary interests. He was much interested in the works and person of the Danish mathematician Christoffer Dybvad. His inclination to science, he had manifested by continued study of arithmetic and geometry, collecting geometrical instruments and globes from the Netherlands.

Ulrik seems, however, to have had the desire to amuse himself and was blamed to drink, but certainly not too much so that this governance would suffer. His acting shows him strong willed and persistent, and the many deficiencies in the prince-bishopric did not escape his eyes. A great service he rendered by reorganising the entirely dissipated cathedral chapter, even though he could not fully revive this outdated institution. At least temporarily he shook the canons in their sluggish inaction. He and his appointed government members wanted to create administrative order to the general benefit of his subjects.

== Ancestry ==
Ancestors of Ulrik of Denmark (1578–1624)

16. Christian I of Denmark (=#28)
8. Frederick I of Denmark (=#14)
17. Dorothea of Brandenburg (=#29)
4. Christian III of Denmark
18. John Cicero, Elector of Brandenburg
9. Anna of Brandenburg
19. Margaret of Thuringia
2. Frederick II of Denmark
20. John V, Duke of Saxe-Lauenburg
10. Magnus I, Duke of Saxe-Lauenburg
21. Dorothea of Brandenburg
5. Dorothea of Saxe-Lauenburg
22. Henry IV, Duke of Brunswick and Lunenburg (Wolfenbüttel)
11. Catherine of Brunswick and Lunenburg (Wolfenbüttel)
23. Catherine of Pomerania-Wolgast
1. Ulrik of Denmark
24. Magnus II, Duke of Mecklenburg
12. Albert VII, Duke of Mecklenburg
25. Sophie of Pomerania-Wolgast
6. Ulrich, Duke of Mecklenburg
26. Joachim I Nestor, Elector of Brandenburg
13. Anna of Brandenburg
27. Elizabeth of Denmark
3. Sophie of Mecklenburg-Güstrow
28. Christian I of Denmark (=#16)
14. Frederick I of Denmark (=#8)
29. Dorothea of Brandenburg (=#17)
7. Elizabeth of Denmark
30. Bogislaw X, Duke of Pomerania
15. Sophie of Pomerania
31. Anna of Poland

== Notes ==
Ulrik of Denmark, Duke of Schleswig, Holstein, Stormarn and Ditmarsh House of Oldenburg Born: 30 December 1578 in Kolding Died: 27 March 1624 in Rühn
Titles in Lutheranism
Vacant Title last held by Adolf of Holstein-Gottorp vacancy since 1586 with (general) superintendents pastoring	Lutheran bishop of Schleswig; 1602–1624	Vacant Title next held by Ulrich Sechmann Boesen vacancy till 1854 with (general) superintendents pastoring since 1636
Regnal titles
Religious titles
Preceded by Ulrich of Mecklenburg as Ulrich I	Administrator of the Prince-Bishopric of Schwerin as Ulrich II; 1603–1624	Succeeded by Ulrik of Denmark as Ulrich III
