= Peter Jonson =

British royal shoemaker

Peter Jonson or Johnson and Garret Jonson were London-based shoemakers who worked for Elizabeth I and James VI and I. The records of shoes they made for monarchs and courtiers gives an idea of changing fashions.

== The Jonson family and royal shoes ==
Garret Jonson made shoes for Elizabeth I until 1590. He is recorded as her shoemaker in 1552, during the reign of her brother, Edward VI, when she lived at Hatfield House. As a foreign-born worker in London, his name appears in the Returns of Aliens. In 1571, his place of birth was recorded as Cleve, or "Clevedon", and he was married to Alice. He had been working in London since around 1546, and was now a denizen of England.

In 1564, Garret Jonson made a dozen pairs velvet shoes with velvet covered cork and wooden heels and "rames". At this time Elizabeth had shoes made from Spanish leather, and he made leather shoes for Aura Soltana. Garret Johnson also supplied six shoes horns to the queen in 1563 and 1564. These were the first recorded shoes for the queen made with heels.

William and Rowland Winter also made shoes for Elizabeth I in the 1570s. In Scotland, the shoes of Mary, Queen of Scots and Lord Darnley at this time were made by Fremyn Alezard. Alezard's apprentice Alexander Crawfurd went on to make shoes for King James VI.

Peter Jonson was probably Garret Jonson's son. He made shoes for Thomasina the court dwarf in 1594. In 1595 Peter Jonson made shoes for Queen Elizabeth with high heels and arches. The warrant or order, quoted by the historian Janet Arnold gives an idea of his work, in modern spelling:

Peter Jonson for 8 pair of Spanish leather shoes of sundry colours; 6 pair of Spanish leather leather "pantobles" of sundry colours; one pair of Spanish leather shoes with high heels and arches; one pair straw colour "pantobles" with arches, and laid on (decorated) with silver lace; for translating (repairing and refashioning) of one pair of cloth of silver pantobles lined with white satin; for translating one pair of shoes with high heel; and for translating 8 pairs of shoes and pantobles of our great wardrobe.

After the Union of the Crowns in 1603, Peter Jonson made shoes for King James and Anne of Denmark, some were said to be in "Belone" fashion, possibly the clerk's error for Polish or Bolognese.

== Garat Johnson, sculptor ==
Possibly related to these shoemakers, two monumental sculptors of Dutch origin working in Elizabethan and Jacobean London were called "Garat Johnson" (Gheerart Janssen (sculptor)). Two other London craftsmen, called Gerald Jansson, were locksmiths and cutlers.
