= Fremyn Alezard =

French shoemaker

Fremyn Alezard (died 1584) was a French shoemaker based in Edinburgh who worked for Mary, Queen of Scots and subsequently her political rivals.

== Career ==
His name was recorded in various spellings including; Fremyne Allisarde, Fernim Alezart, and Flemyng Allasart. In Scotland a shoemaker was called a "cordiner". Alezard made slippers and cork-soled pantoufle from fine velvet and imported leather for Mary, Lord Darnley, their son James VI, James Stewart, Earl of Moray, and a largely aristocratic clientele.

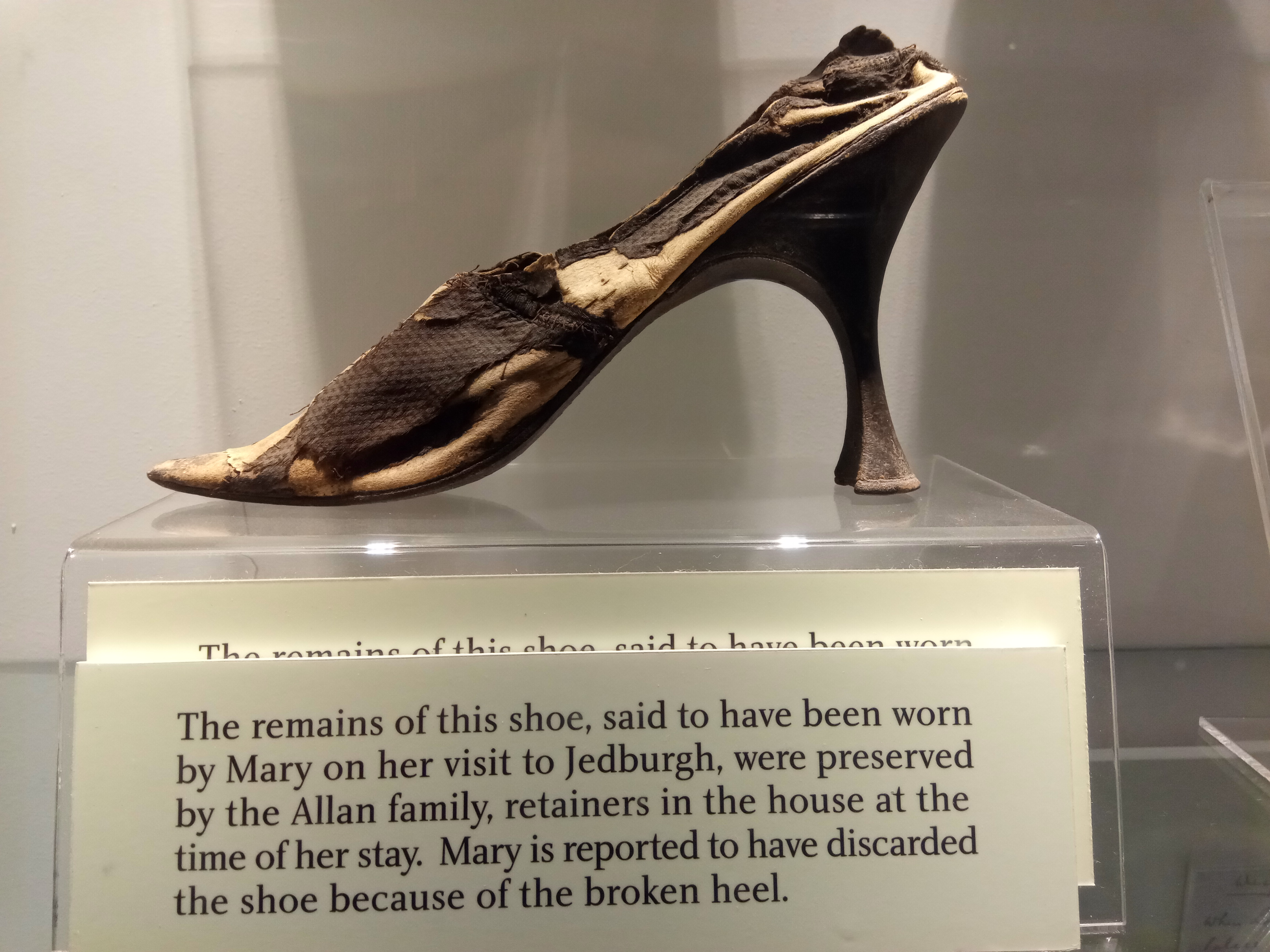
Mary's shoe preserved at the Mary Queen of Scots House, Jedburgh

Fremyn Alezard was appointed as a member of the queen's household, among the gens de mestier, the royal artisans.

The record of Mary's wardrobe kept by Servais de Condé mentions black velvet delivered to the shoemaker, probably Alezard, for the queen's shoes, soulliers, and pantoufles, slippers. The shoes were lined with black taffeta. There were still 36 pairs of Mary's velvet shoes with gold and silver trim in Edinburgh Castle in 1578. Both velvet and leather shoes were sent to Mary when she was a prisoner in Lochleven Castle in 1567, and in 1568 mules and "marikyn" leather shoes made by "Fremyne Allasard" were sent to her at Bolton Castle. "Marikyn" is a Scots language word meaning goatskin leather, originally sourced from Morocco.

The records of shoes made for Elizabeth I suggest that she wore only velvet shoes before 1564, when she started to order Spanish leather shoes and slippers, perhaps following the example of her servant Aura Soltana. Shoes for Elizabeth I at this time were made by Garret Johnson.

After Mary was exiled in England there were at least 36 pairs of her velvet shoes "of sundry colours" stored in Edinburgh Castle. In July 1568 Alezard went to France for a time and before he left, Regent Moray paid his bill for mules and shoes.

In January 1572, some of the supporters of Mary, Queen of Scots in Edinburgh were summoned to appear at Leith for their disloyalty to the Regent. Alezard was probably the "French sutar" or cobbler included in a list of their names.

The young king's shoes came to be made by Henry Quhite or White. A detailed bill for the king's shoes from Quhite in 1576 lists velvet mules and "pantons" and "marikin" leather shoes stitched with silk.

Fremyn Alezard died on 11 November 1584. Alezard's shoemaking stock, listed in his will, in 1584 included two kinds of leather, cork, and 7 pairs of mules & shoes priced at 30 shillings the pair. He had a significant quantity of money in gold coin. He was owed money by Robert Douglas the young Laird of Lochleven, Adam Erskine, Commendator of Cambuskenneth, the Laird of Findlater, the Earl of Mar, the Earl of Angus, Esmé Stewart, 1st Duke of Lennox, Colonel William Stewart, Sir Thomas Erskine, the Master of Orkney, George Douglas of Rungallie, and John Bog, porter of the royal palace of Holyroodhouse.

One of his apprentices, John Hepburn, became a burgess of Edinburgh on 14 June 1595. Another apprentice, Alexander Crawfurd, became a burgess of Edinburgh on 13 February 1583 and was subsequently shoemaker to James VI.

== Family and the French school in Edinburgh ==
He was married to Jacquette Pranger or Peanger and they had four daughters, Charlotte, Katherine, Agnes or Amé, and Frances.

After his death in 1584, Alezard's family made efforts to recover money owed to his estate. His daughter Charlotte had married Pasquier Bernard, a surgeon in Orléans, and he was the legal guardian or tutor of her younger sisters. He petitioned Henry III of France for help, and Henry III wrote to King James VI in May 1588. Jacquette Peanger had entrusted 500 or 600 Écu with Nicholas Langlois, the French schoolmaster in Edinburgh (and father of Esther Inglis), and the goldsmith Thomas Foulis for the benefit of her younger children. Pasquier Bernard asked for the money to be returned, but instead Langlois insisted two of the children should be sent back to Edinburgh from Orléans. Henry III made Pasquier Bernard's case to James VI, according to the amity and auld alliance between the two nations.

== Shoes ==
The Mary Queen of Scots House at Jedburgh has a high-heeled black satin shoe said to have been discarded by Mary when she rode to Hermitage Castle.

In England, Mary continued to wear high-heeled slippers which she called "mules haultes". In January 1586 she advised the French ambassador Guillaume de l'Aubespine de Châteauneuf that because she often received new slippers, they would be an ideal place to conceal secret messages in the cork soles and heels. He should be sure that the slippers with secret letters should be discretely marked on the sole with a fingernail.
