= Thomazina Muliercula =

Thomazina Muliercula (died 1603), also known as Mrs Tamasin and Tomasin de Paris, was a French woman who became an English jester. She was the court dwarf and jester of Queen Elizabeth I between 1577 and 1603.

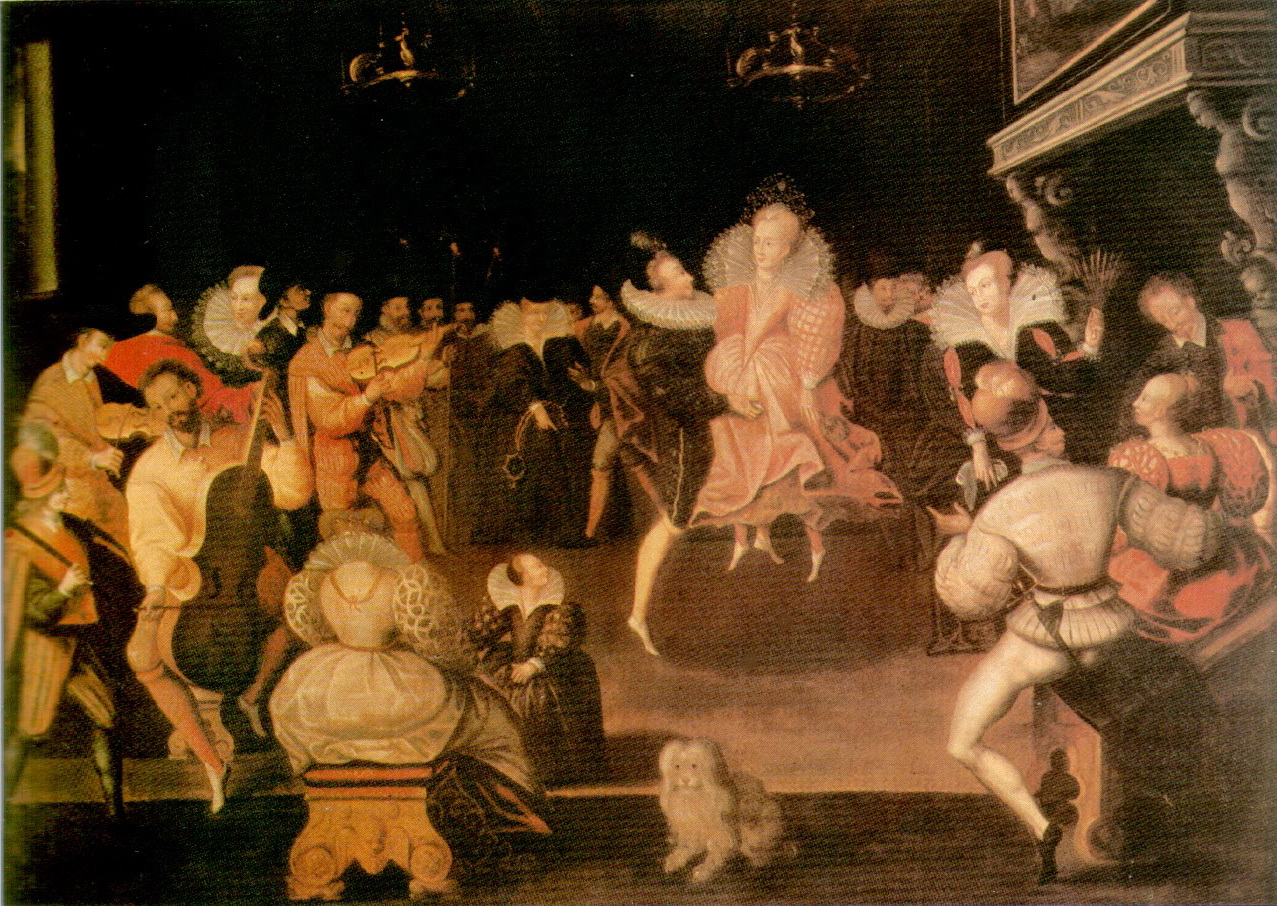
Courtly dance, a painting at Penshurst Place traditionally associated with Thomazina

She was presumably from Paris. In 1579, her sister Prudence de Paris is briefly noted in the documents. "Muliercula" was not her surname, but a Latin word for "little woman".

She may have taken the place of Ippolyta the Tartarian in 1577. As customary for a female jester and court dwarf, she was referred to as "lady-in-waiting". She was evidently able to read and write, since the queen gifted her with pen and paper. She may have practiced embroidery, as she also received knives and shears.

Thomazina is regularly noted in the queen's wardrobe expenses between 1577 and 1603, sometimes as "the woman dwarf". Mary Scudamore took charge of her linen. The tailor Walter Fyshe made her a gown of white damask and a "safeguard or kirtle" possibly worn while riding. Peter Jonson made her shoes. In 1597, her clothes included fashionable and voluminous farthingale sleeves.

She is sometimes identified in a painting at Penshurst Place formerly attributed to Marcus Gheeraerts. The scene, a volta dance at the French court, is sometimes said to include Elizabeth, Robert Dudley, and Thomazina.
