= List of listed buildings in Longforgan, Perth and Kinross =

This is a list of listed buildings in the parish of Longforgan in Perth and Kinross, Scotland.

== List ==
Name	Location	Date Listed	Grid Ref. (Note: Sometimes known as OSGB36, the grid reference (where provided) is based on the British national grid reference system used by the Ordnance Survey. • "Guide to National Grid". Ordnance Survey. • "Get-a-map". Ordnance Survey.)	Geo-coordinates	Notes	LB Number (Note: Historic Environment Scotland assign a unique alphanumeric identifier to each designated site in Scotland, for listed buildings this always begins with "LB", for example "LB12345".)	Image
Invergowrie Station Road, Invergowrie Station, Footbridge Over Railway				56°27′23″N 3°03′28″W	Category C(S)	13458	Upload Photo
The Knapp The Cottage				56°28′11″N 3°09′40″W	Category C(S)	13243	Upload Photo
The Knapp, Dovecot Cottage				56°28′11″N 3°09′42″W	Category B	13244	Upload Photo
The Knapp, Old Rossie Lodge, Including Gatepiers And Boundary Wall				56°27′58″N 3°08′56″W	Category C(S)	13254	Upload Photo
The Knapp, Rossie Estate Sawmill				56°28′20″N 3°10′26″W	Category B	13260	Upload Photo
Longforgan, Main Street, The Elms, Including Boundary Wall				56°27′30″N 3°06′51″W	Category B	13270	Upload Photo
Longforgan, Main Street, The Cairn, Including Coach House/Stable, The Cairn Lodge, Gatepiers And Enclosing Walls				56°27′27″N 3°06′49″W	Category C(S)	13271	Upload Photo
Longforgan, Main Street, Mo Dhachaidh, Harlcot Rannoch And Hillview Cottages				56°27′25″N 3°07′26″W	Category C(S)	13275	Upload Photo
Longforgan, Main Street, Longforgan Farm Steading				56°27′27″N 3°07′25″W	Category C(S)	13279	Upload Photo
Longforgan, Main Street, Market Cross				56°27′26″N 3°07′12″W	Category A	13283	Upload another image See more images
Longforgan, Main Street, Steeple Cottage And The Quoins Cottage				56°27′27″N 3°07′19″W	Category B	13285	Upload Photo
Longforgan, Woodlands, Including Lodge And Gatepiers				56°27′34″N 3°08′10″W	Category C(S)	13289	Upload Photo
Newton Bank Farmhouse, Including Enclosing Wall And Outbuilding				56°28′44″N 3°11′50″W	Category B	13298	Upload Photo
Newton Gray, Farmhouse And Steading, Including Cottage And Bothy, And Machinery Shed				56°28′50″N 3°12′06″W	Category C(S)	13299	Upload Photo
South Ballo, Steading, Including Gatepiers And Adjoining Walls At Farmhouse				56°29′57″N 3°12′08″W	Category B	13303	Upload Photo
Wellbank, Farmhouse				56°28′38″N 3°10′50″W	Category B	13304	Upload Photo
Invergowrie, 46 Main Street, Bullionfield Club (Former Free Church), Including Boundary Wall And Railings				56°27′40″N 3°03′31″W	Category B	12852	Upload Photo
Castle Huntly, Ice House				56°27′00″N 3°08′02″W	Category B	12870	Upload Photo
Dron Steading				56°28′38″N 3°08′36″W	Category C(S)	10839	Upload Photo
Invergowrie, 11 And 13 Station Crescent				56°27′19″N 3°03′36″W	Category C(S)	10846	Upload Photo
Invergowrie, 11 And 13 Station Terrace, Including Boundary Wall				56°27′23″N 3°03′37″W	Category C(S)	10851	Upload Photo
The Knapp, Lochspout Cottage And 1 And 2 Millhill Cottages				56°28′02″N 3°08′57″W	Category C(S)	13247	Upload Photo
Little Ballo Farmhouse, Including Garden Wall And Steading				56°29′56″N 3°11′44″W	Category C(S)	13266	Upload Photo
Lochton, Lochton House, Including Outbuilding And Walled Garden				56°29′25″N 3°12′49″W	Category B	13267	Upload Photo
Longforgan, Main Street, Cherry Cottage And Drumbank				56°27′26″N 3°07′05″W	Category C(S)	13272	Upload Photo
Longforgan, Main Street, Spar Shop (Formerly Longforgan Farmhouse)				56°27′26″N 3°07′23″W	Category C(S)	13280	Upload Photo
Longforgan, Main Street, Modwenna (Former Manse), Including Gatepiers And Boundary Wall				56°27′24″N 3°07′16″W	Category B	13284	Upload Photo
Monorgan, Former Corn Mill				56°26′34″N 3°06′10″W	Category C(S)	13296	Upload Photo
North Ballo, Farmhouse				56°30′38″N 3°13′35″W	Category C(S)	13300	Upload Photo
Invergowrie, 47 Errol Road, Carselea				56°27′15″N 3°03′55″W	Category B	12845	Upload Photo
Castle Huntly, Including Terraced Garden And Statuary, And Boundary Walls				56°26′55″N 3°07′58″W	Category A	12868	Upload another image See more images
Invergowrie, Errol Road, Invergowrie Primary School (Earlier Building) And The Old School House, Including Boundary Walls				56°27′39″N 3°03′44″W	Category C(S)	10843	Upload Photo
Invergowrie 1-5 (Odd Nos) Station Terrace, Ham-Na-Vok Lagganallackie, Rowanbank, Including Boundary Wall And Gates				56°27′23″N 3°03′36″W	Category B	10850	Upload Photo
Kingoodie, East Quarry Pier				56°27′03″N 3°04′27″W	Category B	10852	Upload Photo
Kingoodie, 3 And 4 Linlithgow Place, Including Boundary Walls				56°27′07″N 3°04′26″W	Category C(S)	13240	Upload Photo
The Knapp, Knapp Lodge				56°28′08″N 3°09′24″W	Category C(S)	13246	Upload Photo
The Knapp, New Mill Of Knapp, Former Road Bridge Over Knapp Burn				56°28′12″N 3°10′03″W	Category B	13251	Upload Photo
Longforgan, Main Street, The Cottage				56°27′27″N 3°07′03″W	Category C(S)	13273	Upload Photo
Millhill, Farmhouse, Including Lodge And Gatepiers				56°28′13″N 3°08′45″W	Category C(S)	13291	Upload Photo
Millhill, Steading				56°28′14″N 3°08′51″W	Category B	13293	Upload Photo
Monorgan, Road Bridge Over Huntly Burn				56°26′37″N 3°06′20″W	Category C(S)	13294	Upload Photo
Monorgan, Farmhouse				56°26′33″N 3°06′11″W	Category C(S)	13295	Upload Photo
Castle Huntly, Dovecot				56°27′05″N 3°08′08″W	Category B	12869	Upload Photo
Drimmie Lodge, Including Gatepiers, Gates And Adjoining Walls (Rossie Priory)				56°27′18″N 3°08′54″W	Category B	10836	Upload Photo
Dron Chapel				56°28′42″N 3°08′43″W	Category B	10837	Upload Photo
Invergowrie, Braehead Road, The Rowans, Including Gates, Gatepiers And Boundary Wall				56°27′12″N 3°04′08″W	Category C(S)	10841	Upload Photo
Invergowrie, Main Street, The Old Manse				56°27′40″N 3°03′34″W	Category C(S)	10844	Upload Photo
Invergowrie, 2, 4 And 6 Station Crescent, And 16 Station Road, Including Boundary Wall And Gatepiers				56°27′21″N 3°03′38″W	Category C(S)	10847	Upload Photo
Invergowrie 12 And 14 Station Road, Harrowby, Intertay Including Boundary Wall And Gatepiers				56°27′21″N 3°03′40″W	Category C(S)	10849	Upload Photo
The Knapp, 1 (Chapel Cottage), 2, 3 4 Parkview Terrace				56°28′12″N 3°09′41″W	Category B	13255	Upload Photo
The Knapp, Road Bridge Over Knapp Burn, Including Rossie Policies Wall At East				56°28′25″N 3°10′54″W	Category C(S)	13257	Upload Photo
Longforgan, Main Street, Longforgan Parish Church, Including Churchyard, Gatepiers And Outbuildings				56°27′25″N 3°07′20″W	Category B	13277	Upload Photo
Invergowrie, 88 And 90 Errol Road, Including Boundary Walls				56°27′20″N 3°03′51″W	Category C(S)	12846	Upload Photo
Invergowrie, 63A-C Main Street, Old Rectory, Former Coach House/Stables, Including Boundary Wall				56°27′41″N 3°03′50″W	Category C(S)	12851	Upload Photo
Invergowrie, 7 And 9 Station Crescent, Including Wall And Gatepiers				56°27′20″N 3°03′36″W	Category C(S)	10845	Upload Photo
Invergowrie, 13 Station Road, Brantwood, Including Boundary Wall, And Gatepiers				56°27′23″N 3°03′36″W	Category B	10848	Upload Photo
The Knapp, New Mill Of Knapp, Including Storage Shed				56°28′12″N 3°10′04″W	Category B	13249	Upload Photo
The Knapp, Rossie Estate Sawmill, Former Road Bridge Over Knapp Burn				56°28′20″N 3°10′33″W	Category B	13261	Upload Photo
Longforgan, Former Railway Station House				56°26′40″N 3°06′19″W	Category C(S)	13269	Upload Photo
Longforgan, Main Street, Hawthorne Cottage				56°27′27″N 3°07′08″W	Category B	13276	Upload Photo
Longforgan, Main Street, Longforgan Farmhouse (No 20 Castle Huntly Holdings				56°27′27″N 3°07′27″W	Category C(S)	13278	Upload Photo
Longforgan, Main Street, Westerlea St Colme's, Glomach, Including Boundary Walls				56°27′28″N 3°07′03″W	Category C(S)	13287	Upload Photo
Monorgan, Steading Including Former Mill				56°26′33″N 3°06′13″W	Category C(S)	13297	Upload Photo
Rawes, Farmhouse, Including Garden Wall, Gatepiers And Gates				56°26′23″N 3°07′34″W	Category B	13301	Upload Photo
Invergowrie, Errol Road, Invergowrie Primary School (Later Building), Including Boundary Wall				56°27′38″N 3°03′45″W	Category C(S)	12844	Upload Photo
Invergowrie, Main Street, All Souls' Episcopal Church, Including Gatepiers And Boundary Walls				56°27′39″N 3°03′46″W	Category A	12849	Upload another image
Kingoodie, 1 And 2 Linlithgow Place, Including Boundary Walls				56°27′07″N 3°04′25″W	Category C(S)	10853	Upload Photo
The Knapp, Lauriston, The Kennels, Including Boundary Wall				56°28′25″N 3°10′34″W	Category C(S)	13248	Upload Photo
The Knapp, Newton Sawmill House				56°28′29″N 3°11′01″W	Category B	13252	Upload Photo
The Knapp, Parkview Terrace, The Old Schoolhouse				56°28′11″N 3°09′40″W	Category C(S)	13256	Upload Photo
The Knapp, Trottick Cottage, Barn				56°28′21″N 3°10′27″W	Category B	13265	Upload Photo
Marywell, Steading, Including Outbuilding				56°28′41″N 3°10′56″W	Category B	13290	Upload Photo
Millhill House, Including Cottage And Outbuildings				56°28′13″N 3°08′53″W	Category C(S)	13292	Upload Photo
Castle Huntly, Bogle Bridge, Road Bridge Over Huntly Burn				56°26′51″N 3°07′41″W	Category C(S)	12872	Upload Photo
East Newton, Road Bridge Over Lochton Burn				56°28′57″N 3°11′31″W	Category C(S)	10840	Upload Photo
Invergowrie Bullionfield, Mill Road, Former Bullionfield Paper Mill				56°27′44″N 3°03′47″W	Category C(S)	10842	Upload Photo
The Knapp, Nye Cottage				56°28′11″N 3°09′38″W	Category C(S)	13253	Upload Photo
The Knapp, Rock Cottage				56°28′26″N 3°10′53″W	Category B	13258	Upload Photo
The Knapp, Trottick House, Including Byre And Barn				56°28′21″N 3°10′26″W	Category B	13263	Upload Photo
The Knapp, Trottick And Hayhoe Cottages				56°28′21″N 3°10′26″W	Category C(S)	13264	Upload Photo
Longforgan, Castle Road, Huntly Cottage				56°27′24″N 3°07′24″W	Category C(S)	13268	Upload Photo
Longforgan, Main Street, The Croft, Including Terrace Wall				56°27′26″N 3°06′54″W	Category B	13274	Upload Photo
Longforgan, Main Street, Longforgan Primary School, Including Boundary Wall, Gatepiers, Gates And Playsheds				56°27′25″N 3°07′14″W	Category B	13281	Upload Photo
Longforgan, Main Street, Longforgan Primary School, School House, Including Boundary Wall				56°27′26″N 3°07′13″W	Category B	13282	Upload Photo
Longforgan, Main Street, Longforgan War Memorial				56°27′25″N 3°07′24″W	Category C(S)	13286	Upload Photo
Longforgan, Main Street, Ashlea And Maywood, Including Boundary Wall				56°27′31″N 3°06′47″W	Category C(S)	13288	Upload Photo
Invergowrie 61 Main Street, Old Rectory, Including Boundary Wall				56°27′40″N 3°03′49″W	Category B	12850	Upload Photo
Castle Huntly, North Gates				56°27′12″N 3°07′49″W	Category A	12871	Upload another image See more images
Dron Farmhouse, Including Walled Garden And Enclosing Wall				56°28′37″N 3°08′32″W	Category C(S)	10838	Upload Photo
The Knapp, Hilton Of Knapp Steading, Including Implement Shed And Bothy				56°28′21″N 3°09′53″W	Category C(S)	13245	Upload Photo
The Knapp, New Mill Of Knapp, The Mill House				56°28′13″N 3°10′04″W	Category B	13250	Upload Photo
The Knapp, Rosebank Cottage, Including Outbuilding				56°28′12″N 3°09′46″W	Category C(S)	13259	Upload Photo
The Knapp, Telephone Kiosk Near Dovecot Cottage				56°28′11″N 3°09′44″W	Category B	13262	Upload Photo
Snabs, Farmhouse				56°27′27″N 3°08′30″W	Category B	13302	Upload Photo
Invergowrie, 1A Main Street, Old Toll House, Including Boundary Wall				56°27′37″N 3°03′24″W	Category C(S)	12847	Upload Photo
Invergowrie, Main Street, St Columba's Church And Hall (Church Of Scotland), Including Gatepiers And Boundary Walls				56°27′39″N 3°03′41″W	Category B	12848	Upload Photo
Burnside Of Monorgan, Road Bridge Over Huntly Burn				56°26′33″N 3°05′59″W	Category C(S)	12862	Upload Photo

== Key ==
The scheme for classifying buildings in Scotland is:

- Category A: "buildings of national or international importance, either architectural or historic; or fine, little-altered examples of some particular period, style or building type."
- Category B: "buildings of regional or more than local importance; or major examples of some particular period, style or building type, which may have been altered."
- Category C: "buildings of local importance; lesser examples of any period, style, or building type, as originally constructed or moderately altered; and simple traditional buildings which group well with other listed buildings."

In March 2016 there were 47,288 listed buildings in Scotland. Of these, 8% were Category A, and 50% were Category B, with the remaining 42% being Category C.
