= Easter parade =

Festive strolling procession on Easter Sunday

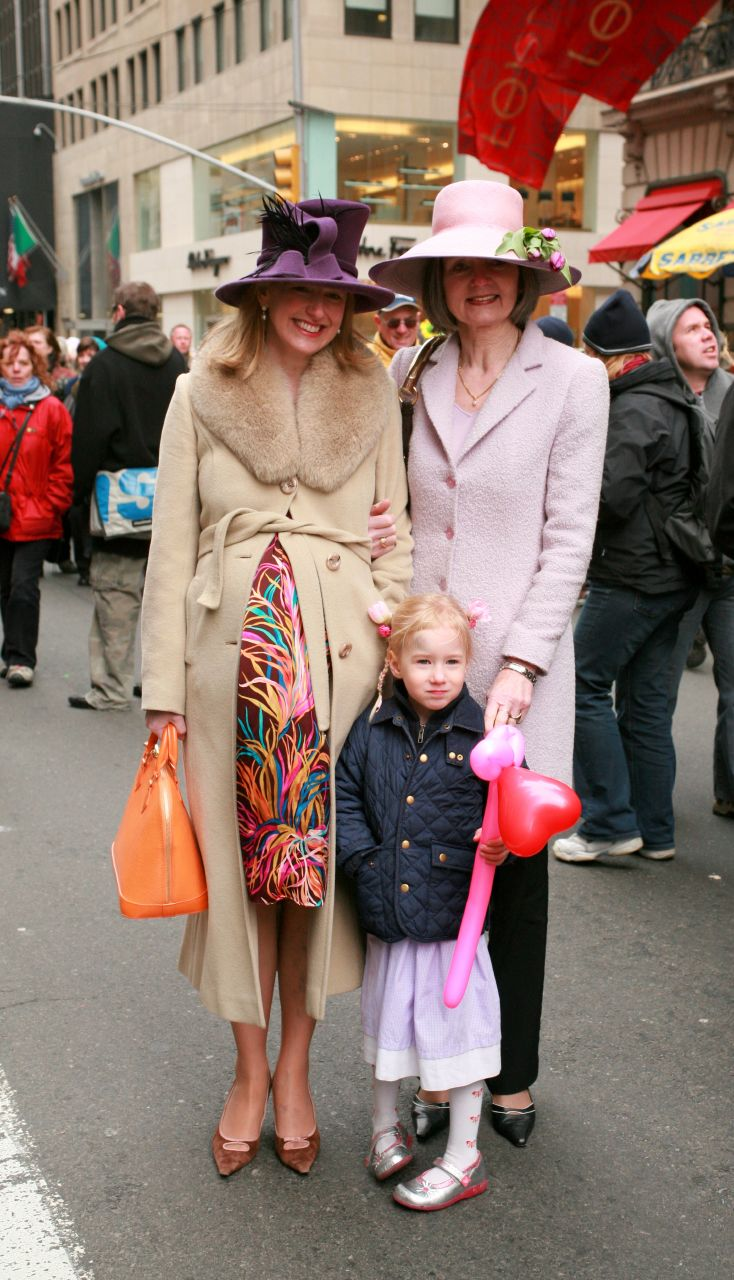
Participants in New York City's 2007 Easter parade

The Easter parade is an American cultural event consisting of a festive strolling procession on Easter Sunday. Typically, it is a somewhat informal and unorganized event, with or without religious significance. Persons participating in an Easter parade traditionally dress in new and fashionable clothing, particularly ladies' hats, and strive to impress others with their finery. The Easter parade is most closely associated with Fifth Avenue in New York City, but Easter parades are held in many other cities. Starting as a spontaneous event in the 1870s, the New York parade became increasingly popular into the mid-20th century—in 1947, it was estimated to draw over a million people. Its popularity has declined significantly, drawing only 30,000 people in 2008.

== Early Easter parades ==
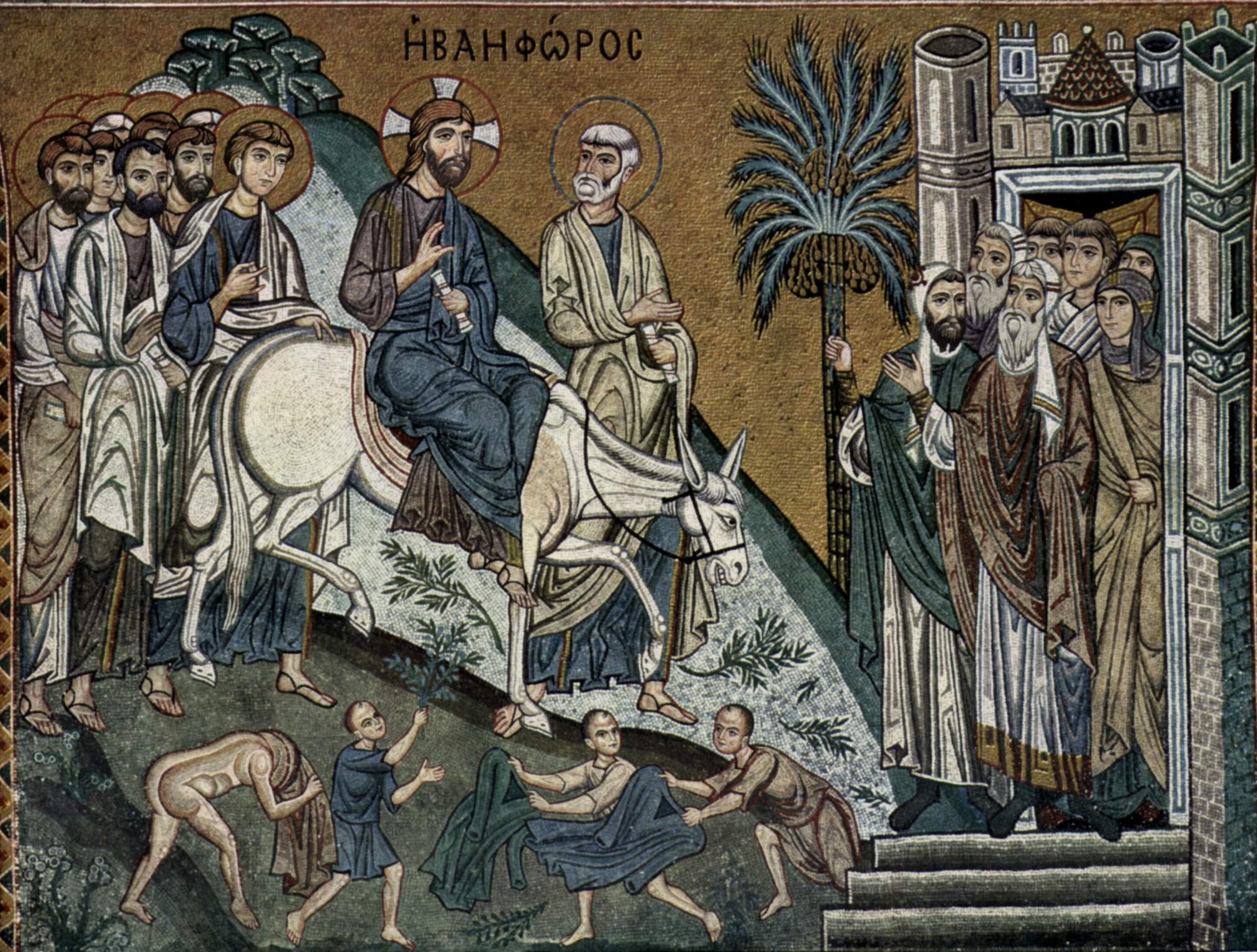
Jesus' entry into Jerusalem on Palm Sunday has been cited as the earliest precursor to modern Easter parades.

Easter processions or parades, often including special dress, have been part of Christian culture since its earliest beginnings. The Bible records two processions in the first Holy Week. The first was on Palm Sunday as Jesus was welcomed to Jerusalem by an adoring throng. The second took place as Jesus carried a cross to Calvary. These processions are often commemorated in Christian church services, and are seen as the earliest predecessors of the modern Easter parade.

During the Dark Ages, Christians in Eastern Europe would gather in a designated spot before Easter church services, then walk solemnly to the church. Sometimes the congregation would form another parade after the services, retracing their steps and singing songs of praise. These processions had two purposes—to demonstrate to churchgoers the unity of spirit found in their faith, and to reach out to nonbelievers in a highly visible manner. Even in those times, participants wore their finest attire to show respect for the occasion.

In the Middle Ages, the clergy expanded these processions into teaching tools. Paintings and statues would be placed along city streets, where church members could walk from one to another to see all the Stations of the Cross. To a public that had no access to the Bible and often could not understand the Latin language in which church services were conducted, these special processions were a means to understanding their faith.

Other parades have been held on important days during and close to Lent. An example can be found in today's parades on Mardi Gras. Beginning about 1782, German settlers in Pennsylvania held non-religious parades on Easter Monday, then widely celebrated as a holiday. The parades continued for over a century.

== Easter finery ==
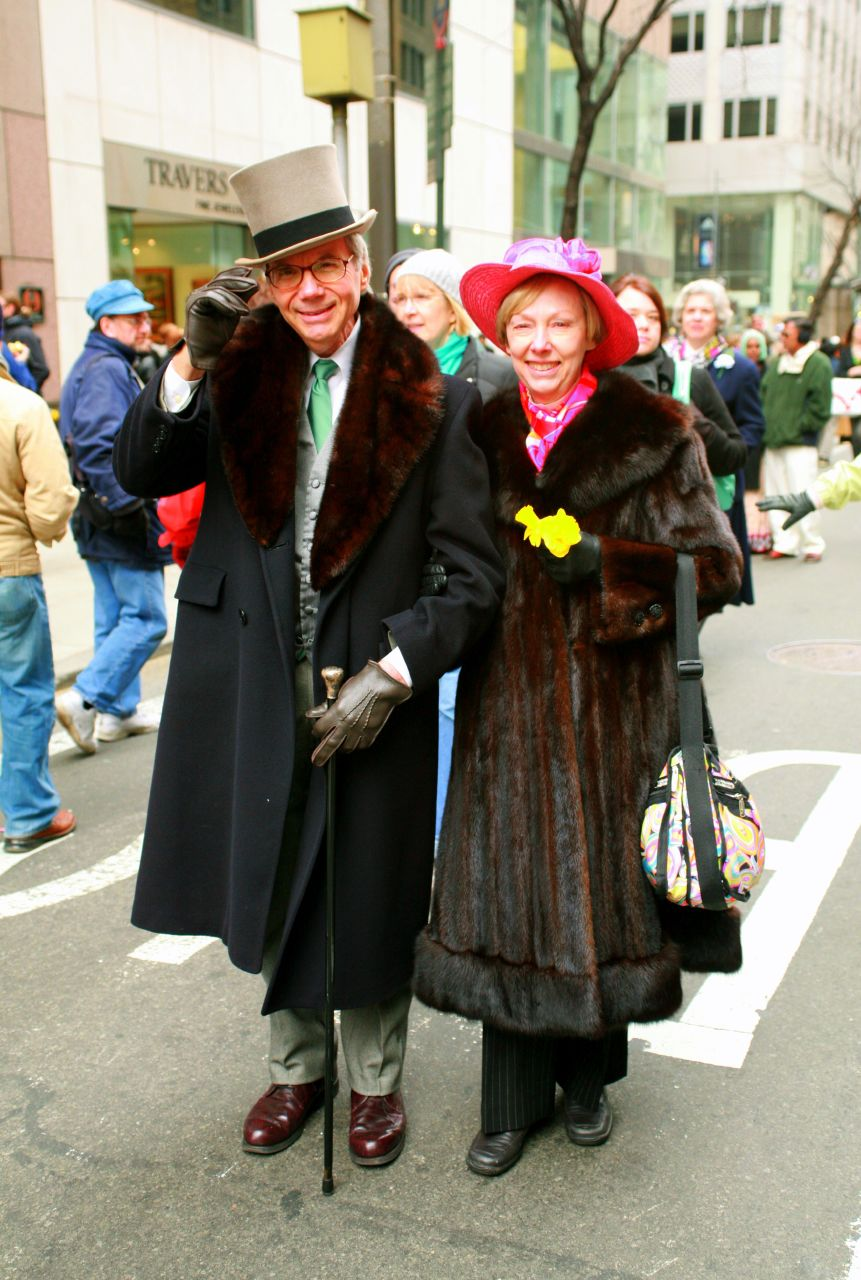
Participants in New York City's 2007 Easter parade

Having new clothes for Easter had deep roots in European customs. Sacred times called for special forms of dress—material markers of holiness and celebration. Distinctive garb for Easter, like one's "Sunday best" and the special vestments of priests, for centuries showed the solemnity and sacredness of the season.

Authorities attribute the introduction of elaborate Easter ceremonies, including gaudy dress and display of personal finery, to the Roman Emperor Constantine I in the early part of the 4th century, when he "ordered his subjects to dress in their finest and parade in honor of Christ's resurrection".

A superstition current in Tudor times held that unless a person had new homespun cloth available at Easter, moths and crickets would eat the old goods, and destructive rooks would nest in large numbers around the residence. An old Irish adage stated "For Christmas, food and drink; for Easter, new clothes," and a 15th-century proverb from Poor Robin's Almanack states that if on Easter Sunday some part of one's outfit is not new, one will not enjoy good luck during the year:

At Easter let your clothes be new,
Or else be sure you will it rue.

== The New York parade ==
From the 1880s through the 1950s, New York's Easter parade was one of the main cultural expressions of Easter in the United States. It was one of the fundamental ways that Easter was identified and celebrated. The seeds of the parade were sown in New York's highly ornamented churches—Gothic buildings such as Trinity Episcopal Church, St. Patrick's Cathedral, and St. Thomas' Episcopal Church. In the mid-19th century, these and other churches began decorating their sanctuaries with Easter flowers. The new practice was resisted by traditionalists, but was generally well received.

As the practice expanded, the floral displays grew ever more elaborate, and soon became defining examples of style, taste, abundance, and novelty. Those who attended the churches incorporated these values into their dress. In 1873, a newspaper report about Easter at Christ Church said "More than half the congregation were ladies, who displayed all the gorgeous and marvelous articles of dress,... and the appearance of the body of the church thus vied in effect and magnificence with the pleasant and tasteful array of flowers which decorated the chancel."

By the 1880s, the Easter parade had become a vast spectacle of fashion and religious observance, famous in New York and around the country. It was an after-church cultural event for the well-to-do—decked out in new and fashionable clothing, they would stroll from their own church to others to see the impressive flowers (and to be seen by their fellow strollers). People from the poorer and middle classes would observe the parade to learn the latest trends in fashion.

By 1890, the annual procession held an important place on New York's calendar of festivities and had taken on its enduring designation as "the Easter parade".

As the parade and the holiday together became more important, dry goods merchants and milliners publicized them in the promotion of their wares. Advertisements of the day linked an endless array of merchandise to Easter and the Easter parade. In 1875, Easter had been invisible on the commercial scene. By 1900, it was as important in retailing as the Christmas season is today.

Not everyone was enthused about the display of wealth and beauty. Critics worried regularly over Easter extravagance and the "vaunting of personal possessions" that offended deep-seated American values of simplicity, frugality, and self-denial. In 1914, social critic Edwin Markham spotlighted the crushing hardships of the sweatshop workers who made Easter's artificial flowers. During the Great Depression, groups of unemployed workers paraded in coarse and worn-out clothing, often carrying banners drawing attention to their plight. One of these compared the cost of a single Fifth Avenue gown to a year's worth of welfare relief for a job seeker and his family. Cranks and demagogues often used the parade to attract public attention and to plead their causes.

In 1929, Edward Bernays decided to pay women to smoke their "torches of freedom" as they walked in the Easter Parade in New York. This was a shock because until that time, women were only permitted to smoke in certain places such as in the privacy of their own homes. He was very careful when picking women to march because, "while they should be good looking, they should not look too model-y"; and he hired his own photographers to make sure that good pictures were taken and then published around the world. Ruth Hale called for women to join in the march saying, "Women! Light another torch of freedom! Fight another sex taboo!"

Once the footage was released, the campaign was being talked about everywhere, and the women's walk was seen as a protest for equality and sparked discussion throughout the nation and is still known today. The targeting of women in such tobacco advertising led to higher rates of smoking among women. In 1923 women only purchased 5% of cigarettes sold; in 1929 that percentage increased to 12%, in 1935 to 18.1%, peaking in 1965 at 33.3%, and remaining at this level until 1977.

In 1933, American songwriter Irving Berlin wrote the music for a revue on Broadway called As Thousands Cheer. It included his song "Easter Parade", which he had been working on for fifteen years, and in which he had finally captured the essence of the parade. Both the song and the revue were tremendously popular. The song became a standard, and fifteen years later was the basis for the film Easter Parade.

By the mid-20th century, the parade's religious aspects had faded, and it was mostly seen as a demonstration of American prosperity. 1946 saw a resurgence of stunts, pranks, and extravagant behavior. In 1947, the State Department's Voice of America did a radio broadcast of the Fifth Avenue parade to the Soviet Union, the idea being to show the economic inferiority of the Soviet system. In 1955, The Saturday Evening Post stated that New York's springtime pageant was only an incidental celebration of a religious holiday, and had become a reflection of the fact that, in America, a person was as good as the clothes and other goods he or she was able to buy. The parade itself had become an unstructured, boundless event, with no apparent beginning, ending, organization, or purpose. What had begun in the 1870s as a parade of refinement and religious display had become, to some critics, merely an ostentatious frolic.

Today, New Yorkers celebrate Easter parade and bonnet festival with great enthusiasm. Celebrations are enjoyed both by families wearing Sunday best and people and pets in outlandish costumes, often paying homage to the parade's former glory by, to cite a typical example, wearing garish hats with live birds in flower-adorned cages. New Yorkers of all ages and types participate and it's popular with the festive set. It takes place on Fifth Avenue, around 49th to 57th Streets, in Manhattan from 10 a.m. to 4 p.m. on Easter Sunday. Anyone may participate, and dressing up is highly encouraged. One of the most popular accessories are bonnets of all styles and shapes.

In 2020, the Easter parade in Manhattan, New York, was cancelled due to the coronavirus pandemic.

=== Gallery ===
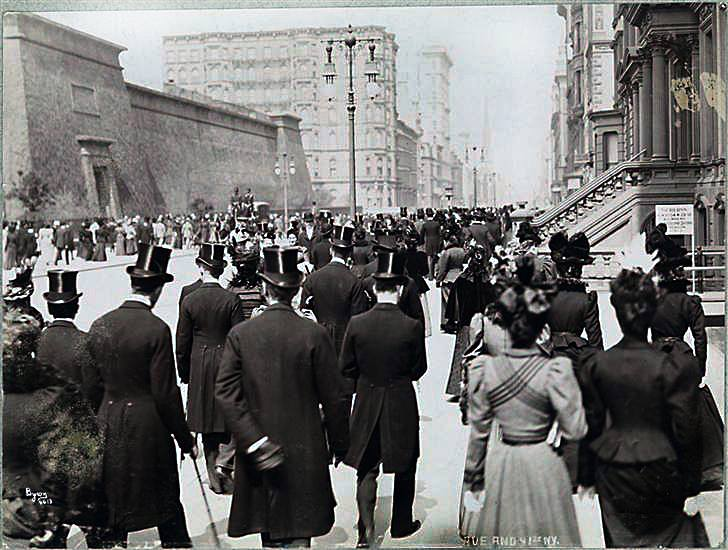
The parade on 5th avenue, 1897. The Croton Reservoir is visible.

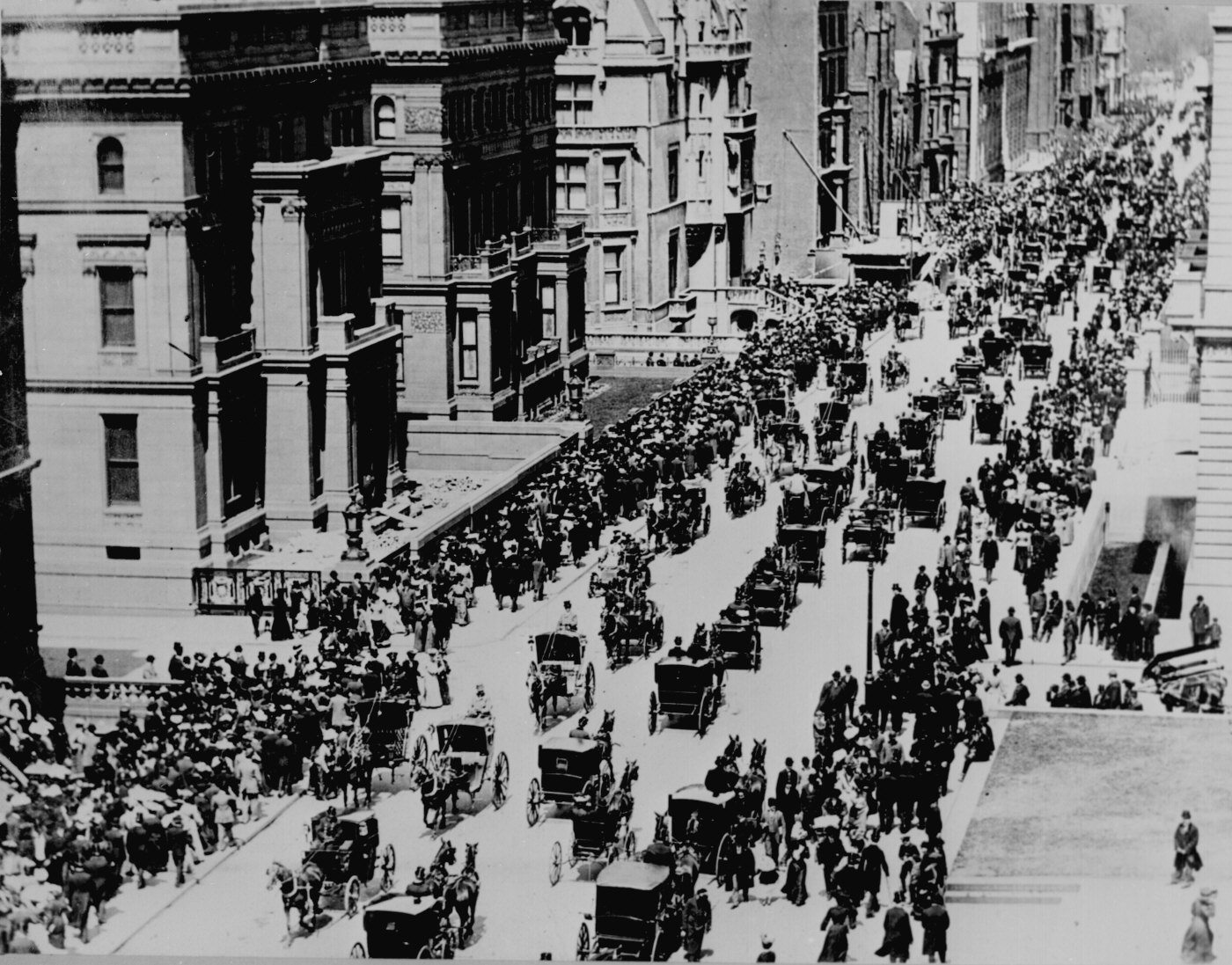
Fifth Avenue, 1900

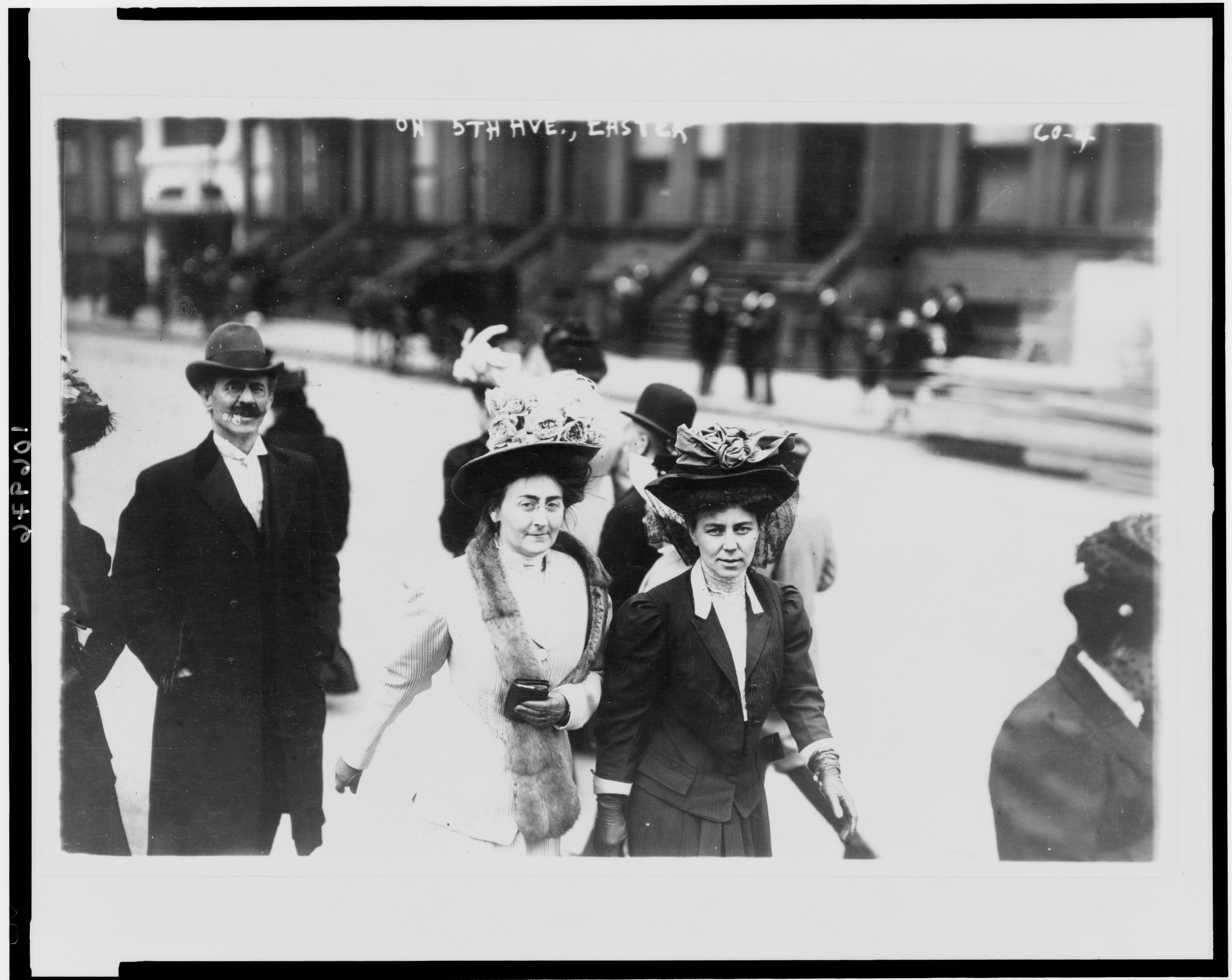
1908

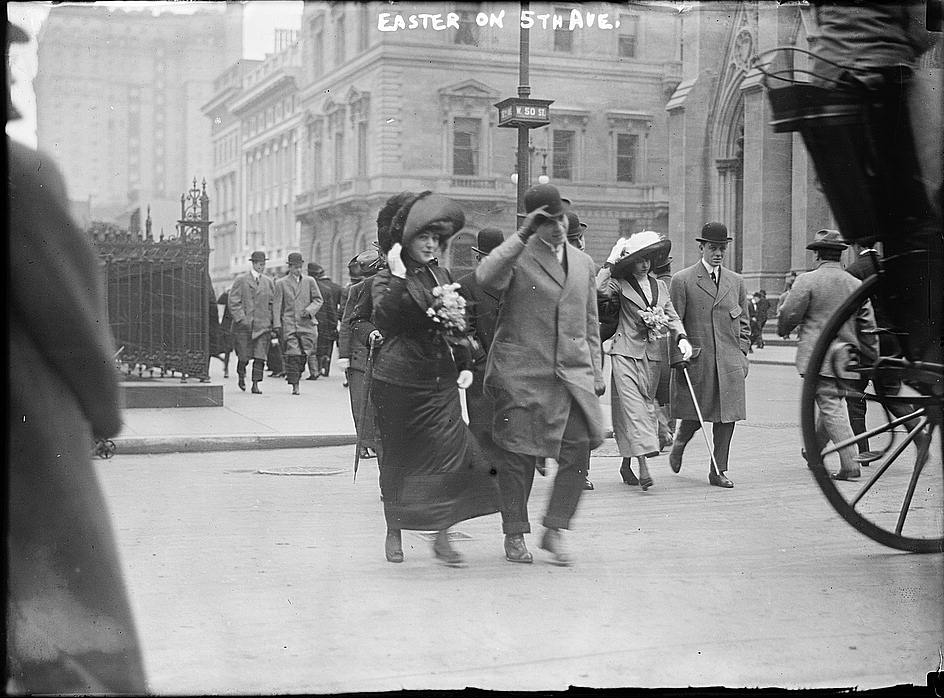
1910

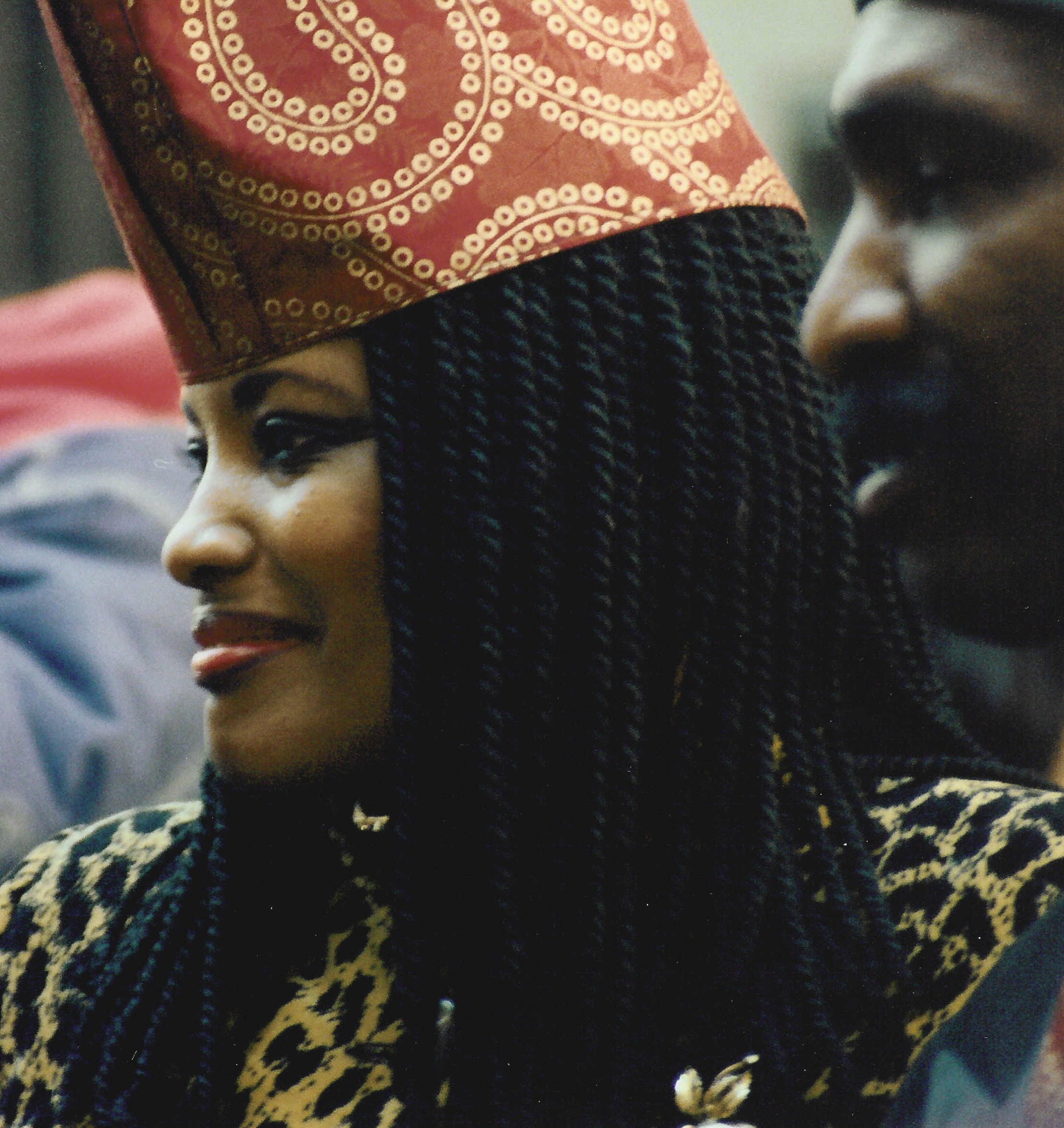
1995

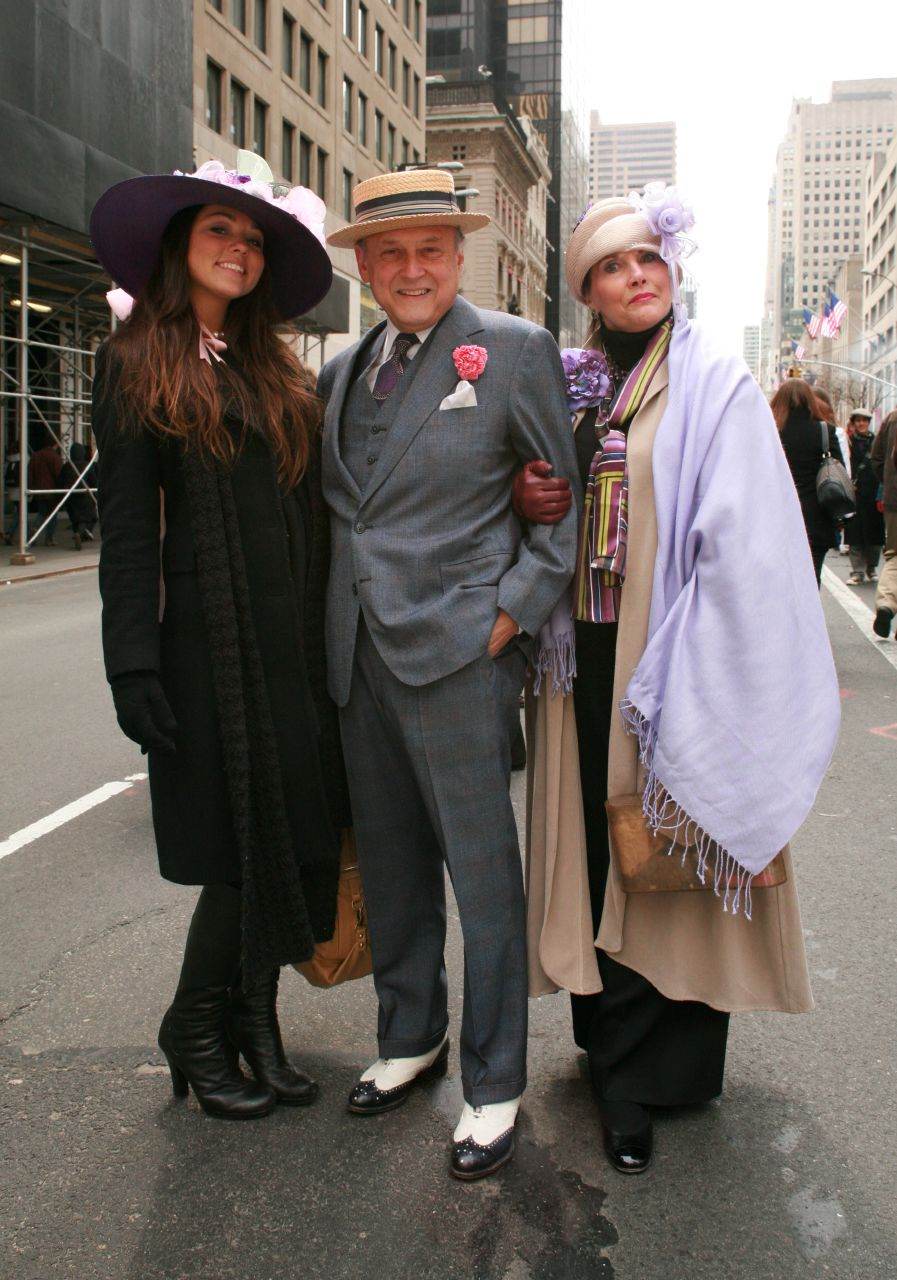
2007

== Other venues ==
As New York's parade grew in prominence from the 1880s onward, other cities developed their own versions. Philadelphia and Boston were among these, as were Coney Island and Atlantic City, where the parades became tourist attractions. In 1925, Coney Island merchants hired fifty show girls to parade in bathing suits as part of the event. The crowds were huge. During the 1920s, Atlantic City's parade attracted 200,000 and more. The parade there had become a vacation carnival of costuming and consumption—a rollicking amusement for the tourist.

In the 21st century, Easter parades are conducted in many cities, with prominent ones:

Richmond has hosted a parade along four blocks of Monument Avenue for over 50 years with 25,000 participants dressed in their Easter attire join it annually. The parade moves.

New Orleans hosts parades on Easter Sunday, including the French Quarter Easter Parade featuring classic attires, the Chris Owens Easter Parade with floats and marching bands, and the Gay Easter Parade celebrating LGBTQ culture in a kid-friendly atmosphere.

Toronto hosts a Queen Street East Easter Parade with a few dozen bands and floats. The East Toronto Community Association organized the first parade in 1967, to mark Canada's Centennial year, with a route was along the boardwalk. In 1973, the Beaches Lions Club in Toronto began involvement with the parade. In 1974, the parade was moved to Queen Street. By 1981, the Lions became the organizer of the parade.

== See also ==
- Easter bonnet
