= Apollonia Kickius =

Scottish artist (1669 -1695)

Apollonia Kickius (1669 -1695) (or Kickieus or Kickeus) was a painter working in Scotland in the 17th century. She is one of only three women painters known to be working in Scotland prior to 1700 and is the sole woman in Scotland documented as working in the building trades from the 17th to mid 19th century.

== Early life ==
Apollonia Kickius may have been born in London, England but likely lived in Scotland from the age of 8. Her parents were the artist Edward Kickius (thought to be German or Dutch and also known as Everhardus Kickius or Everard Kick) and Apollonia Hardij of The Hague. Edward Kickius was working in London in the late 1660s and in Scotland from 1677. The family lived in the Canongate, Edinburgh. Apollonia Kickius seems to have stayed in Scotland while her father left Edinburgh to return to England by 1685 and her mother joined him in London in 1687.

== Career ==
In 1685 Kickius signed a receipt for money owing to her father for his painting work at Edinburgh Castle. This would indicate involvement in her father's business. She worked as a painter at Castle Lyon (now known as Castle Huntly) for the 1st Earl of Strathmore (for whom Mrs Morris, an English house painter, also worked). Kickius was probably a mural painter.

Apted and Hannabuss' biographical inventory of painters in Scotland prior to 1700 documents only three women amongst many men: Apollonia Kickius, Esther Inglis and 'Mrs Morris'. Kickius is the only woman working in Scotland in Hewlings' list of women working in the building trades from 1600 to 1850.

== Death ==
Kickius died on 13 September 1695. Her tombstone in Longforgan Church (not far from Castle Lyon) notes her skill as a painter and that she was married:

Interred lyes under this stone
The comely virtuous Apollone
Kickieus, a rare yea matchless one.
Exemplar for a godly life,
A constant modest loving wife.
In paintrie strange who shew more skill
Than ere Apelles could, yet still,
Tho fam'd & prais'd much, most humble.
The heavens bereav'd us of this bliss,
Now great's her gain, ah sad's our loss.
