= Easter bonnet =

Hat worn by women as an Easter tradition

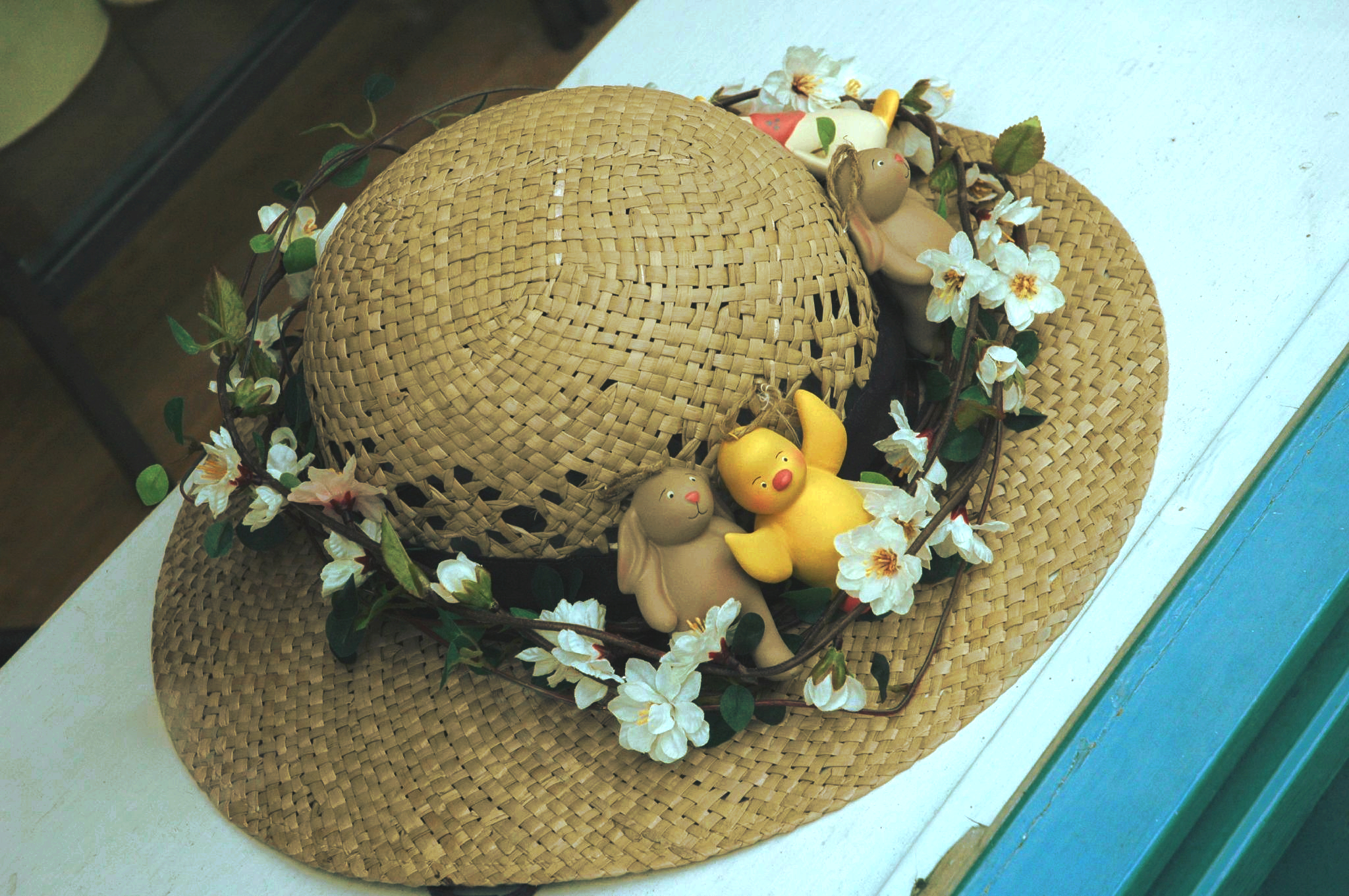
An Easter bonnet

An Easter bonnet is any new or fancy hat worn by women as a Christian headcovering on Easter. It represents the tail end of a tradition of wearing new clothes at Easter, in harmony with the renewal of the year and the promise of spiritual renewal and redemption. As with the wearing of headcoverings by women during Christian prayer and worship in general, the use of Easter bonnets is inspired by the passage of 1 Corinthians 11:1–13 in the Bible.

The Easter bonnet was fixed in popular culture by Irving Berlin, whose frame of reference was the Easter parade in New York City, a festive walkabout that made its way down Fifth Avenue from St. Patrick's Cathedral. Berlin composed the song "Easter Parade" in 1917, and wrote the familiar lyrics in 1933:

In your Easter bonnet
with all the frills upon it,
You'll be the grandest lady in the Easter parade.

At the depths of the Great Depression a new hat at Easter, or a refurbished old one, was a simple luxury.

The broader English tradition of new clothes at Easter has been noticed in late 16th century references by Peter Opie, who noted Mercutio's taunting of Benvolio in Romeo and Juliet: "Did'st thou not fall out with a Tailor for wearing his new Doublet before Easter?" At just the same time Thomas Lodge's moralising pamphlet Wits Miserie (London, 1596) recorded "The farmer that was contented in times past with his Russet Frocke & Mockado sleeues, now sels a Cow against Easter to buy him silken geere for his Credit". In Samuel Pepys' diary, 30 March (Easter Day) 1662, he notes

Having my old black suit new furbished, I was pretty neat in clothes to-day, and my boy, his old suit new trimmed, very handsome.

Poor Robin, an 18th-century English almanac maker, offered the doggerel

At Easter let your clothes be new
Or else be sure you will it rue

and the notion that ill-luck would dog the one who had not something new at Easter expanded in the 19th century.

Today the Easter bonnet is a type of hat that women and girls wear to Easter services, and (in the United States) in the Easter parade following it. Ladies purchased new and elaborate designs for particular church services and, in the case of Easter, took the opportunity of the end of Lent to buy luxury items. In certain localities such as Boston, Easter bonnets are becoming harder to find, while in other areas, such as Burlington County in New Jersey, Easter bonnets remain popular.

Although the traditional Easter bonnet is a hat with depictions of Easter and spring with bunnies, flowers, eggs, etc., recently more creative designers have been producing full face hat and mask taking the mantilla head dress from Spain as their inspiration.

Nowadays a traditional girl's Easter bonnet is usually white, wide-brimmed hat with a pastel colored satin ribbon wrapped around it and tied in a bow. It may also have flowers or other springtime motifs on top, and may match a special dress picked out for the occasion.

== See also ==
- List of hat styles
- Hanging veil
- Headscarf
- Mantilla
