= Alexander Crawfurd =

Scottish shoemaker

Alexander Crawfurd was a Scottish shoemaker who worked for King James VI. Known as a "cordiner", he controversially petitioned the Parliament of Scotland and the Privy Council for the manufacture of better quality leather.

== Career ==
Crawfurd was based in Edinburgh and was a burgess of the town and a member of the Cordiner craft. "Cordiner" was the usual Scottish spelling of "cordwainer", a word related to the Cordovan leather used by shoe makers. Several members of the Crawfurd family were cordiners in Edinburgh and in nearby Liberton. Some apprentice cordiners in Edinburgh came from the Peacock family of Nether Liberton and Cameron. Thomas Peacock from Cameron was an apprentice to Alexander Crawford in 1594.

Mary, Queen of Scots, had employed Fremyn Alezard (died 1584) to make her shoes. Alezard's family was from Orléans and in the 1580s his children were placed in school in Edinburgh with a Huguenot Nicholas Langlois and his daughter Esther Inglis. Alexander Crawfurd was one of Fremyn's last apprentices, and he became a burgess of Edinburgh on 13 February 1583 at the end of his service to "Jermyne Eleazar".

In 1589, James VI travelled to Norway and Denmark to meet his bride Anne of Denmark. He was accompanied by his master of wardrobe William Keith of Delny and Alexander Crawfurd. Crawford was given 25 Danish dalers on 23 March 1590 for making shoes for King James while he was at Copenhagen and Helsingør, around the time he visited Tycho Brahe. Back in Edinburgh, King James's boots for the coronation of Anne in May 1590 were made by his regular cordiner, Henry Quhyte or White.

Henry Quhyte had been appointed to make James's shoes by Mary, Queen of Scots, in July 1566. His account for supplying the King's shoes in 1576 has been published in full. The shoes were delivered to Stirling Castle and were mostly made with white, black, red, or yellow "marekin skins", this being the Scottish word for Morocco leather. When Henry Quhyte made riding boots for the King, the tailor James Inglis made riding socks.

English records show that from the 1570s, Elizabeth I bought more "Spanish leather" shoes, rather than velvet. Mary, Queen of Scots, wore "shoes of Spanish leather with the rough side outward" to her execution in February 1587.

In 1595, Crawfurd was appointed as a member of the royal household to make shoes for King James. The National Records of Scotland retain records of payments to him, and one of his bills which he signed as a receipt. In 1603, King James and Scottish royal family moved to England at the Union of the Crowns. While the tailor Alexander Miller followed the King to London, it seems that Alexander Crawfurd stayed in Edinburgh making shoes.

== The cordiners' petition ==
In June 1617, Alexander Crawfurd, Matthew Crawfurd (died 1622), and John Knieland presented a petition to the Parliament of Scotland. They wanted to prevent "abuses in the tanner craft" that might result in the production of poor quality leather. Matthew Crawford, who was probably Alexander's younger brother, made boots and shoes for Francis Hay, 9th Earl of Erroll, and for the King's advocate in Scotland, Thomas Hamilton, Earl of Melrose.

Subsequently, in 1619, commissioners met with the cordiners and tanners, and heard that "stranger craftsmen" had been brought to Scotland to improve leather production. The Earl of Erroll's son-in-law, John Lord Erskine, had obtained a royal patent to encourage English tanners to come and reform the craft. The tanners now claimed that Crawfurd's petition had been invalid all along, because they did not have the consent of the whole Cordiner craft. They said the problem itself would be solved if tanners let their leather steep for longer in the tanning pot. According to the tanners, the trouble was mostly with producers outside the town, known as the "landward barkers". The process used "tanbark" taken from oak, birch, and alder trees in the Scottish woodlands.

The tanners estimated that there were perhaps 1,500 tanning workers and leather processors in Scotland who needed to upskill and this would take 18 months. The immigrant craftsmen were not allowed apprentices and so were not well-placed to deliver any knowledge exchange. Cordiners took action against Lord Erskine's patent by raising the prices of shoes. In June 1623, tanners from several Scottish burgh towns signed a new petition to the Commissioners of the Burghs to strike down the results of Crawfurd's intervention. In December 1624, the Convention made plans to set up a practical trial to compare the work of Lord Erskine's English tanners against the traditional Scottish method. As the tanners' complaint also concerned the export duty, the issue was complicated and any resolution was long delayed.
