= Farthingale =

Structure to support women's skirts in a desired shape

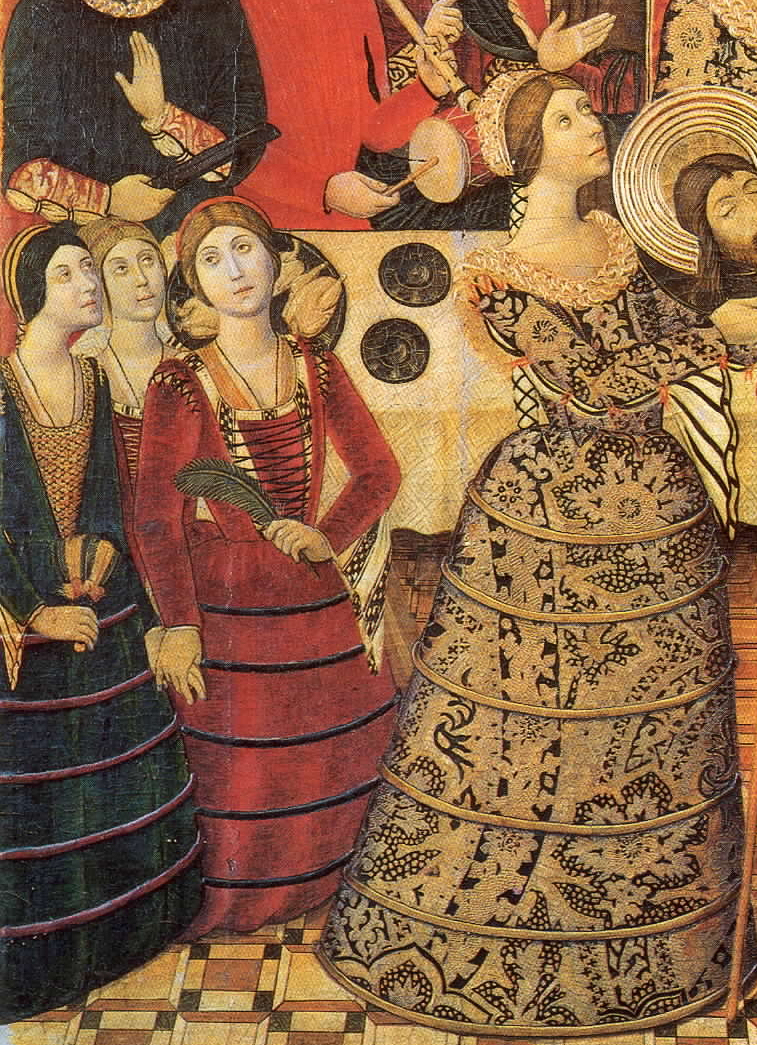
Probably the earliest depiction of the Spanish verdugado. Pedro García de Benabarre, Salome from the St John Retable, Catalonia, 1470–1480.

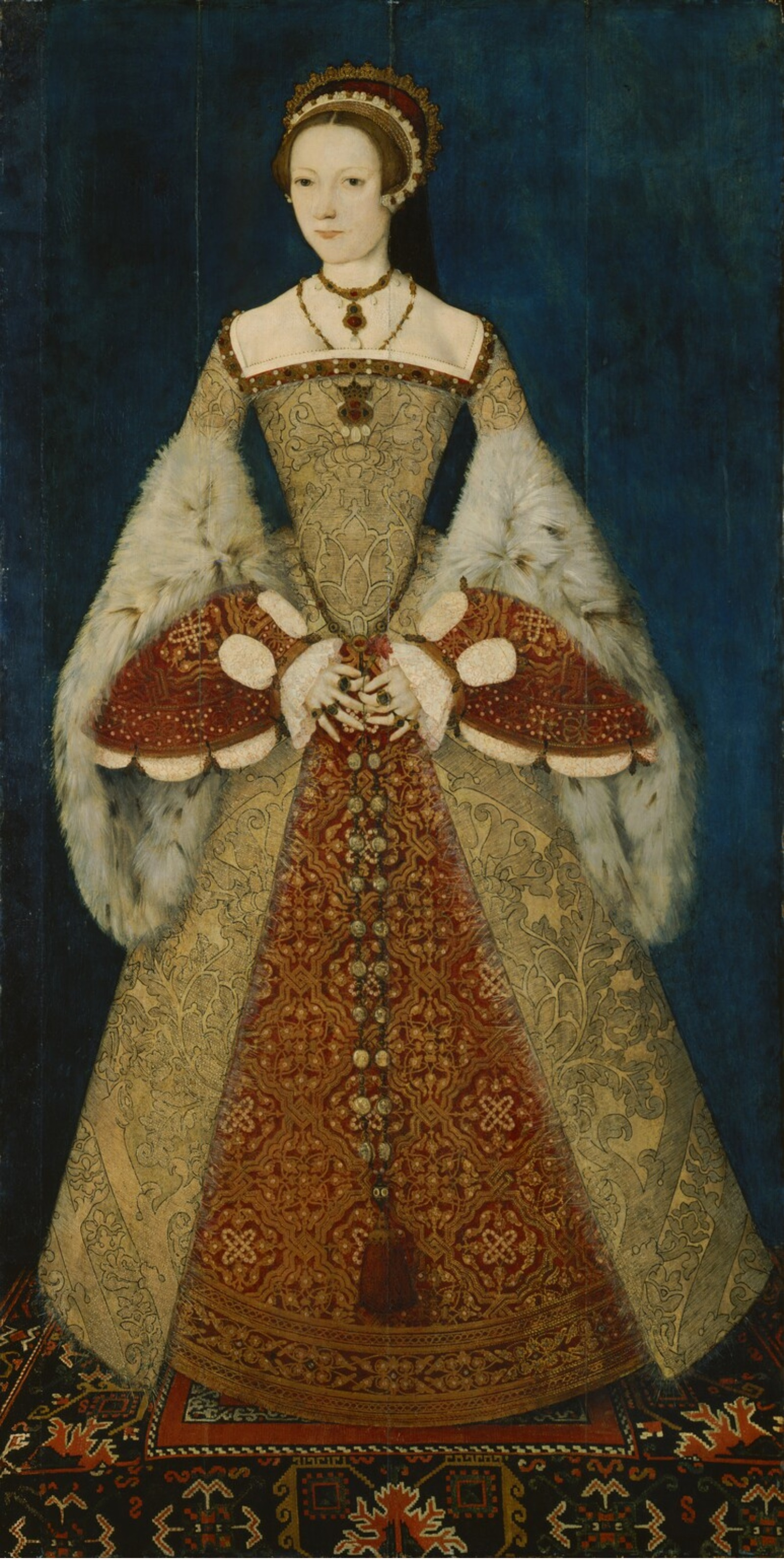
Tudor gown showing the line of the Spanish farthingale: portrait of Catherine Parr, 1545.

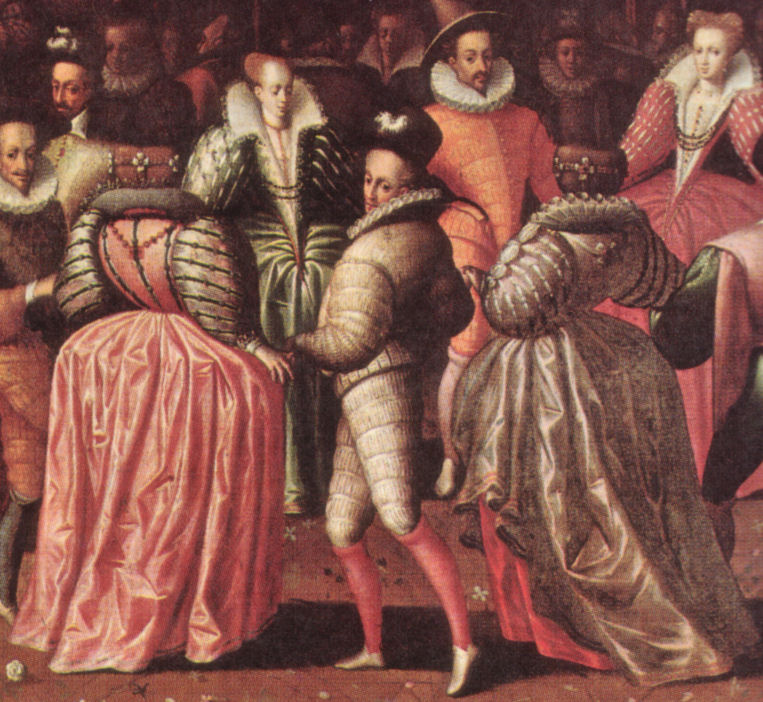
French farthingale rolls, c. 1580

Silhouette of the 1590s: Elizabeth I, the Ditchley portrait

A farthingale is one of several structures used under Western European women's clothing - especially in the 16th and 17th centuries - to support the skirts in the desired shape and to enlarge the lower half of the body. The fashion originated in Spain in the fifteenth century. Farthingales served important social and cultural functions for women in Renaissance Europe as they expressed, primarily when worn by court women, high social position and wealth.

== Spanish farthingale ==
The Spanish verdugado, from which "farthingale" derives, was a hoop skirt originally stiffened with esparto grass; later designs in the temperate climate zone were stiffened with osiers (willow withies), rope, or (from about 1580) whalebone. The name verdugado comes from the Spanish verdugo ("green wood", or the more modern meaning of "executioner").

The earliest sources indicate that Joan of Portugal started to use verdugados with hoops in Spain. Joan had provoked much criticism as she allegedly wore dresses that displayed too much décolletage, and her wanton behaviour was considered scandalous. When she started to use farthingales, court fashion followed suit. As Joan had two illegitimate children by Pedro de Castilla y Fonseca, rumors abounded that she used the farthingale to cover up a pregnancy.

The earliest images of Spanish farthingales show hoops prominently displayed on the outer surfaces of skirts, although later they merely provided shape to the overskirt. Catherine of Aragon is said to have brought the fashion into England on her marriage to Arthur, Prince of Wales, in 1501. She and her ladies were observed to wear "beneath their waist certain round hoops, bearing out their gowns from their bodies, after their country manner". However, there is little evidence to show that she continued to wear this fashion as she adopted English styles of dress. In March 1519 at a masque at Greenwich Palace female dancers in fanciful "Egyptian" costumes wore black velvet gowns "with hoops from the waist downwards", which may have been farthingales.

Farthingales remained a fixture of conservative Spanish court fashion into the early 17th century (as exemplified by Margaret of Austria), before evolving into the guardainfante of 17th-century Spanish dress.

== Farthingales in England and Scotland ==
One of the first references to a farthingale in England comes from the accounts of Princess Elizabeth in 1545 that describe a farthingale made of crimson Bruges satin. The courtier Elizabeth Holland owned two red Bruges satin farthingales in 1547. Anne Seymour, Duchess of Somerset asked for her clothes, including a farthingale to be sent to her in the Tower of London in 1551.

Nicholas Udall mentioned "trick ferdegews and billements of gold" in his comedy Ralph Roister Doister written around 1552. In 1560, Edward More published a poem in which he argued that "verdyngalles" did not contribute to unseemly pride as the materials used, fustian, buckram, and red cloth, were inexpensive. A chest of costume for drama at King's College, Cambridge, in 1554 contained some items fashioned from disused vestments, including two pieces of blue silk which were "tranposyd to wardyngalis" with a pair of sleeves.

Spanish farthingales were bought by Mary I of England and became an essential element of Tudor fashion in England. Mary's chamberer Jane Russell was given a farthingale made from fustian. At a dinner for French diplomats in May 1559, the farthingales of Elizabeth I and her ladies took up so much space that some women of her privy chamber had to sit on the rush-covered floor. Queen Elizabeth was able to adapt the fashion to her statecraft. In 1579, the Spanish ambassador Bernardino de Mendoza reported to Philip II that during an audience Elizabeth lifted her farthingale to allow him sit close to her and talk privately about international politics.

Farthingales were bought for children, including Ann Cavendish, the nine year old stepdaughter of Bess of Hardwick in 1548. Margaret Willoughby had farthingales made of buckram covered with red cloth and "red russell" in September 1550. Margaret and Mary Kitson were bought "verdingalles" in December 1573. Mary, as Countess Rivers, made bequests of clothing in 1641 including a carnation and black taffeta farthingales and rolls.

The French educated Mary, Queen of Scots had a black taffeta "verdugalle" in 1550, and another of violet taffeta, and a set of fashion dolls with 15 farthingales. Whale bone was bought to shape her farthingales in 1562. The contemporary French physician Ambroise Paré noted the use of baleen from the mouths of whales for women's "vertugalles" and "busques".

== French farthingale roll ==
French farthingales originated in court circles in France. Jeanne d'Albret had a farthingale stiffened with rushes, jonc, in 1571. They first appeared in England during the 1570s. On 17 March 1577 the English ambassador to Paris, Amyas Paulet, sent a new type of farthingale to Queen Elizabeth I stating that it was "such as is now used by the French Queen and the Queen of Navarre." Janet Arnold has stated that this new style was probably a roll that sat on top of the cone-shaped Spanish farthingale.

Randle Cotgrave, in his Dictionarie of the French and English Tongues (1611), defined the French farthingale as "the kind of roll used by such women as weare no Vardingales." Several wardrobe accounts and tailors' bills of the late 16th century give us an idea of what these rolls were made of: they were stuffed with cotton and rags, and stiffened with hoops of whalebone, wire, or ropes made of bent reeds. Buckram (stiff canvas) is the most commonly mentioned material. Other references describe the rolls being starched.

Here are a couple of sample references to rolls from Queen Elizabeth I's Wardrobe Accounts (MS Egerton 2806):

- "[for] making of thre rolles of hollande clothe with wyers bounde with reben (1585)
- making of a rolle of starched buckeram with whales bone (1586)

There are no extant examples of this style of undergarment, and only one illustration, a satirical Dutch engraving of c. 1600, that shows the bum-roll being affixed by a tiring-woman. From contemporary references, and the visual cues provided by the engraving, it appears to have consisted of a bolster-like roll either stuffed or held out with reeds which, being fastened around the hips, served the purpose of widening the skirts at the hip area, creating drapes.

Some modern costumers conjecture that the French farthingale and the "great farthingale" were one and the same garment, the difference in shape and construction being due to changes in fashion from the 1580s to the 1590s.

== French wheel farthingale or great farthingale ==
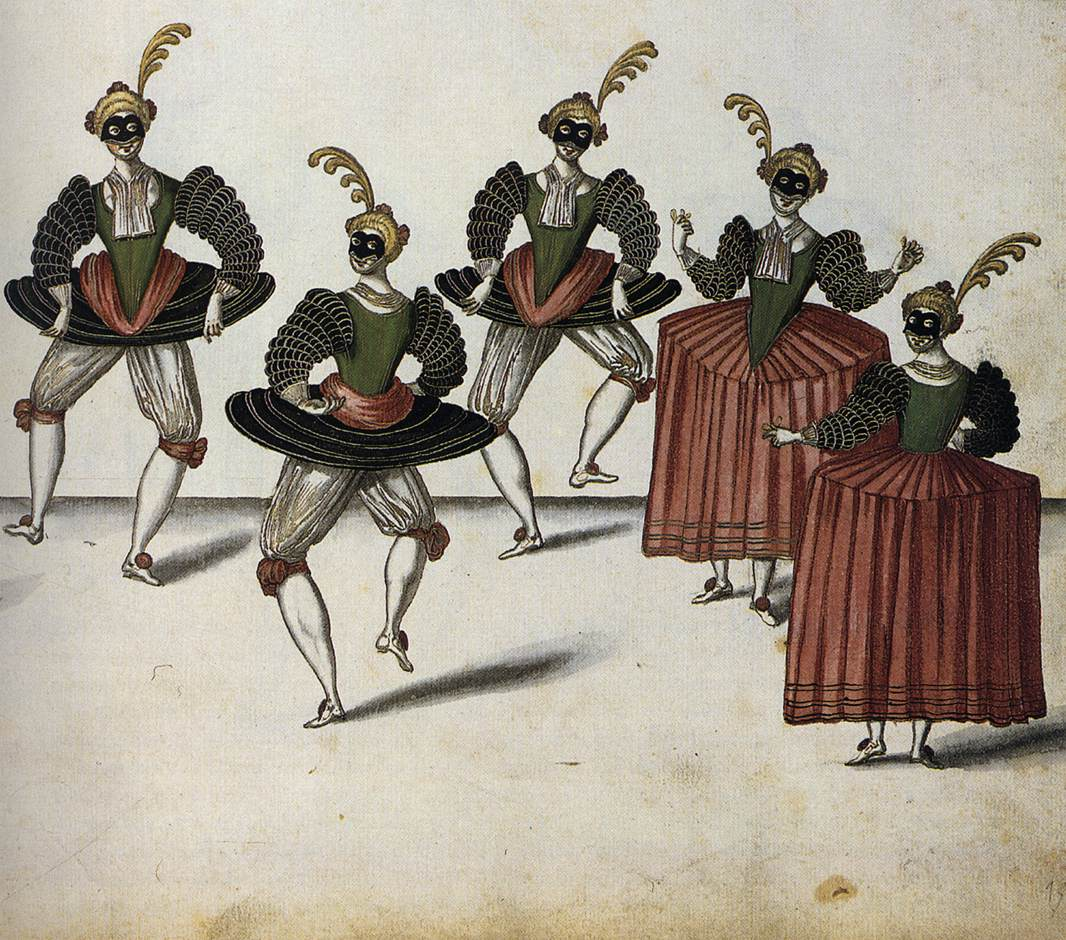
Wheel farthingales, both uncovered and covered by a skirt, depicted in a ballet costume design by Daniel Rabel, 1626

A second style of French farthingale, also known as the wheel, great, drum or cartwheel farthingale, became fashionable in England during the 1590s. It seems to have consisted of several hoops made from whalebone that graduated outwards from the level of the waistline in a wheel shape. This structure was often supported by a padded roll underneath, and was distinct in appearance from the other French farthingale roll, as it had a hard edge from which the skirts dramatically fell.

Although there are also no surviving examples of this type of garment, there are a number of references to a "Great Farthingale" in Queen Elizabeth I's wardrobe accounts during the time when this style was in vogue. "Great" in this context referred to the large circumference of the farthingale, which was required in order to achieve the fashionable silhouette. Changes in the shape of the farthingale impacted the construction of other garments including the "forepart", the exposed front or apron of the skirt or kirtle made from richer fabrics. Later forms of the forepart were larger and wider and some surviving examples seem to have been extended to accommodate the new shape.

The great farthingale appears to have been worn at an angle ("low before and high behind") which visually elongated the wearer's torso while shortening her legs. The angle was likely created by the use of bodies (corsets) or boned bodices with long centre fronts that pushed down on the farthingale, tilting it. Such an effect has been shown in many reconstructions of the garment.

Some historians have raised doubts about the size of these garments, which some contemporaries claimed could be as wide as 1.4 metres. Instead they claim that the seemingly enormous size of these garments was an optical illusion created by wearing it with a pair of bodies (corset) that elongated and streamlined the torso. Criticisms of farthingales are also indicative of spatial anxieties relating to fears about these garments creating intimate personal spaces around the female body, masking the appropriation of social status, and physically displacing men. These fears continued into the eighteenth and nineteenth century, where tropes about the size of hoop petticoats (panniers) and crinolines continued.

=== Anne of Denmark and the fashion of farthingales ===
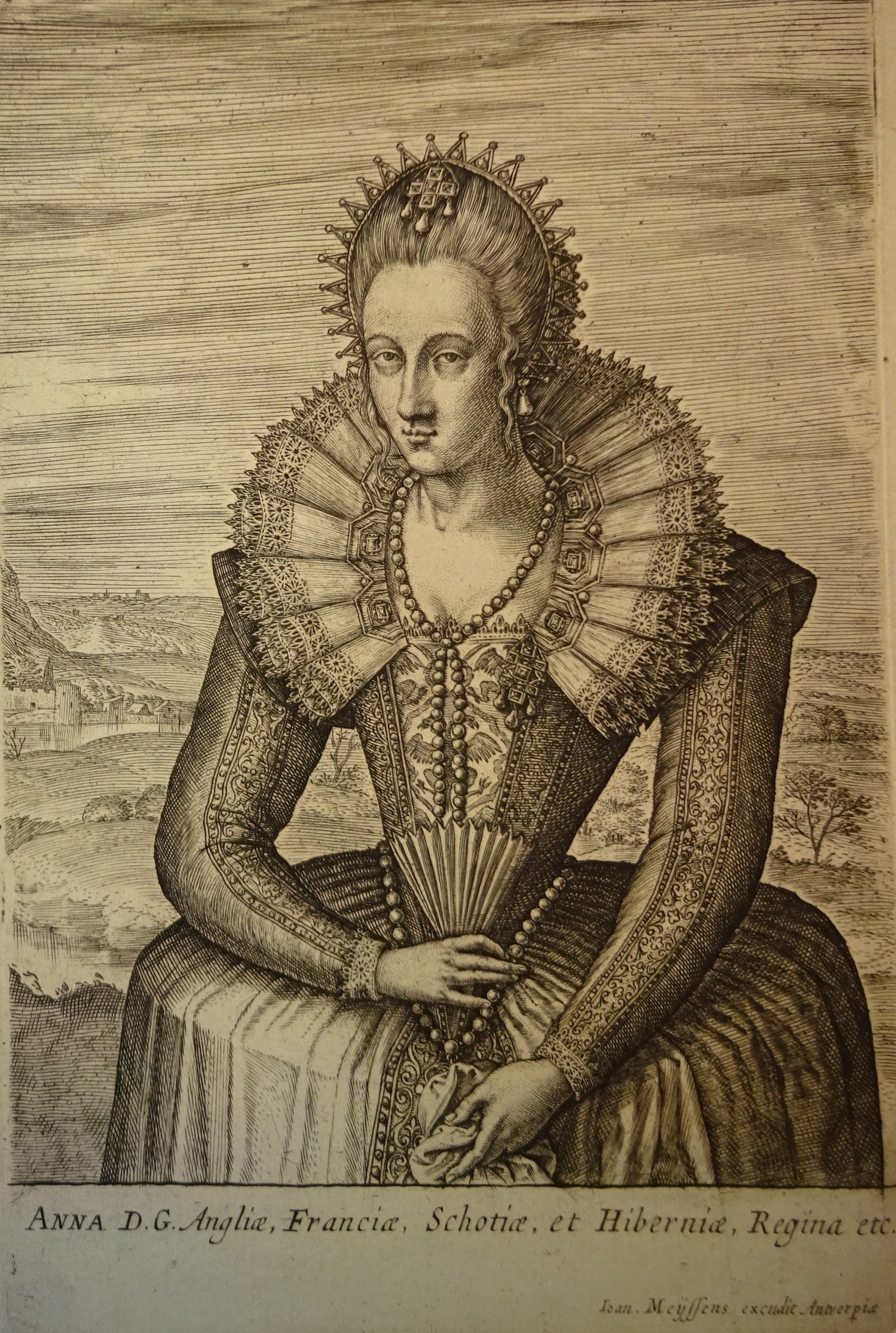
Anne of Denmark depicted wearing a farthingale

Farthingales for Queen Elizabeth were made by specialist Robert Sibthorpe. Anne of Denmark had her gowns altered in 1603 to suit English fashions, and employed Robert Hughes to make farthingales from 1603 to 1618. Robert Naunton thought that Anne's farthingale might conceal a pregnancy in October 1605, writing, "The Queen is generally held to be pregnant, but no appearance eminent by reason of the short vardugals in use".

Farthingales continued to be stiffened with whale baleen. In December 1607, the Lord Mayor of London, Henry Rowe, forwarded a petition to the Privy Council on behalf of traders with Biscay and makers of "Vardyngales, Boddyes, and Sleeves for women" that an import duty should not be levied on "whalebone-fins".

During celebrations in London in 1613 at the wedding of Princess Elizabeth and Frederick V of the Palatinate, it was said that women wearing farthingales were not admitted to crowded events to save space. The letter writer John Chamberlain hoped this would lead to the demise of the fashion. Princess Elizabeth herself was wearing a whalebone farthingale and "bodies" made by John Spence.

In June 1617 Leonora, Lady Bennet's large English farthingale drew unwelcome attention from a crowd in the streets of Amsterdam. In December 1617 the Venetian ambassador Piero Contarini was surprised by the size of Anne of Denmark's farthingale which was four feet wide at the hips. Large styles of French farthingales remained popular in England and France until the 1620s when they disappeared in portraiture and wardrobe accounts. They were replaced by small rolls or bum-rolls that persisted throughout the rest of the seventeenth century. In Spain, the Spanish farthingales evolved into the guardainfante and remained an identifiable part of Spanish dress until the eighteenth century.

Anne of Denmark's daughter, Elizabeth Stuart, Queen of Bohemia, was in Prague in 1620. She wrote of her surprise at the large Spanish style ruffs and Spanish style gowns worn without farthingales by aristocrats and townspeople. She ensured her gentlewomen adapted to the culture.

A well-known anecdote concerning farthingales dates from the end of this period. It was said that in 1628 Jane, wife of the English ambassador Peter Wyche in Constantinople astonished Ayşe Sultan, wife of Murad IV, with her farthingale and she wondered if all English women had such an unusual shape. This story may have been composed in condemnation of the fashion.

== Farthingale sleeves ==
In England, sleeves were enlarged and shaped with a whale bone armature, worn as a support underneath wide sleeves, and these were called "farthingale sleeves" or "vardingall sleeves". They could also be called "trunk sleeves". An account from William Jones for making a gown for Queen Elizabeth includes "a payer of vardingall sleves of holland cloth bented with whals bone and covered with riben." Another account from Jones, for the queen's dwarf Tomasen in 1597, includes a "paier of verthingale slevis of fustian". Jones made many pairs of farthingale sleeves in the 1580s, perhaps for the women of Elizabeth's court.

Such sleeves were worn by women outside court circles. Anne Williamson of Wilne in Derbyshire (a granddaughter of Lord Mordaunt), wrote in December 1590 to her husband about a London tailor who was making her "a pair of verdingale sleeves & a French verdingale". Nathaniel Bacon of Stiffkey, Norfolk, bought "vardinggale slevis" stiffened with "bents" for his wife and daughters in 1592. A Welsh MP William Maurice asked a Shrewsbury tailor to provide a French bodice with farthingale sleeves for his young daughter or cousin in 1594.

Farthingale sleeves for Catherine Fenton Boyle cost 4 shillings and 4 pence in October 1604 from Robert Dobson, a London tailor. In 1605, Catherine Tollemache wrote to her London tailor, Roger Jones, about farthingale sleeves covered with satin, and he suggested another style of sleeve now in fashion would be "fytter" for her new gown. In 1607 there were discussions about taxing imported whale fin baleen, "used only in sleeves and bodies for women".

A surviving single English farthingale sleeve with its whalebone hoops and an outer silk sleeve was rediscovered in 2022. These items, connected with the Willoughby family of Wollaton Hall, were shown on the television program, Antiques Roadshow. A collection of Elizabethan costume remaining at Wollaton Hall was described in 1702 by the family historian Cassandra Willoughby.

== Farthingale pins ==
The wardrobe accounts of Queen Elizabeth mention the purchase of thousands of special "great verthingale pynnes", "myddle verthingale pynnes", and "smale verthingale pynnes" from 1563. These were probably used for pinning deep tucks in farthingales to hold whalebone supports, and to position heavy silk skirts in place over the farthingale.

Elizabeth's pin-maker or "pynner" was Robert Careles. He delivered recycled old farthingale pins and other pins to "Ippolyta the Tartarian", a young Russian woman brought to Elizabeth's court by Anthony Jenkinson. She had a farthingale made of mockado fabric. Pins for Henrietta Maria were made by Thomas Ardington. In 1631 his bill included 13,500 "middle vardingale pins".

== See also ==
- 1500–1550 in fashion
- 1550–1600 in fashion
- 1600–1650 in fashion
- Hoop skirt
- Crinoline

== General and cited references ==
- Anderson, Ruth Matilda (1979). Hispanic Costume 1480–1530. New York: The Hispanic Society of America. ISBN 0-87535-126-3.
- Arnold, Janet (1986) [1985]. Patterns of Fashion: The Cut and Construction of Clothes for Men and Women 1560–1620 (revised edition). Macmillan. ISBN 0-89676-083-9.
- Arnold, Janet (1988). 2020 Queen Elizabeth's Wardrobe Unlock'd. Leeds: W. S. Maney and Son. ISBN 0-901286-20-6.
- Bendall, Sarah (3 May 2019). "The Case of the 'French Vardinggale': A Methodological Approach to Reconstructing and Understanding Ephemeral Garments", Fashion Theory, 23:3: The Making Turn. doi:10.1080/1362704X.2019.1603862.
- Bendall, Sarah (November 2019). "'Take Measure of Your Wide and Flaunting Garments': The Farthingale, Gender and the Consumption of Space in Elizabethan and Jacobean England". Renaissance Studies, 33:5. doi:10.1111/rest.12537.
- Bendall, Sarah (February 2022). "Whalebone and the Wardrobe of Elizabeth I: Whaling and the Making of Aristocratic Fashions". Apparence(s), 11: Modes Animales (Animal Fashions).
