= HM Prison Castle Huntly =

Prison near Dundee, Scotland

HM Open Prison Castle Huntly
- Interactive map of HM Open Prison Castle Huntly
- Location: Longforgan, Perth and Kinross; 56.4489°N 3.1339°W
- Status: Operational
- Security class: Open prison
- Capacity: 285
- Managed by: Scottish Prison Service
- Governor: Tommy Watt

Castle Huntly is a castle in Scotland, now used as a prison under the name HMP Castle Huntly. It is located approximately 7 miles (11 km) west of Dundee in the Carse of Gowrie, Perth and Kinross, close to the shore of the Firth of Tay, and can be seen from the main road linking Dundee and Perth. The castle sits on top of a rocky outcrop surrounded by what is now farmland. In ancient times this land was marshy wilderness and the decision to locate the castle on the rock may have been taken with a view to the castle's defensive position in mind.

== History ==
Lord Gray of Fowlis built Castle Huntly around 1452, under licence from James II of Scotland. The castle changed hands in 1614, when the then Earl of Strathmore acquired it and changed its name to Castle Lyon. Two women — Apollonia Kickius and a Mrs Morris — worked as painters at Castle Lyon in the late 17th century.

In the 1770s, the widow of the 7th Earl of Strathmore sold the castle to George Paterson, of the East India Company. He changed the name back to Castle Huntly.

The castle left the hands of the Paterson family in 1946, after the death of Colonel Adrian Gordon Paterson, when his wife sold the castle to the government. In 1947, the castle was refurbished and became a borstal, then a young offenders' institution before becoming an open prison for adult male prisoners. It is now known as HMP Castle Huntly and is the only open prison in Scotland. Most prisoners at the establishment are low-risks serving short sentences of up to two years, although some are long-sentence prisoners approaching the end of their sentences.
