= Aura Soltana =

Tartar woman at the court of Elizabeth I

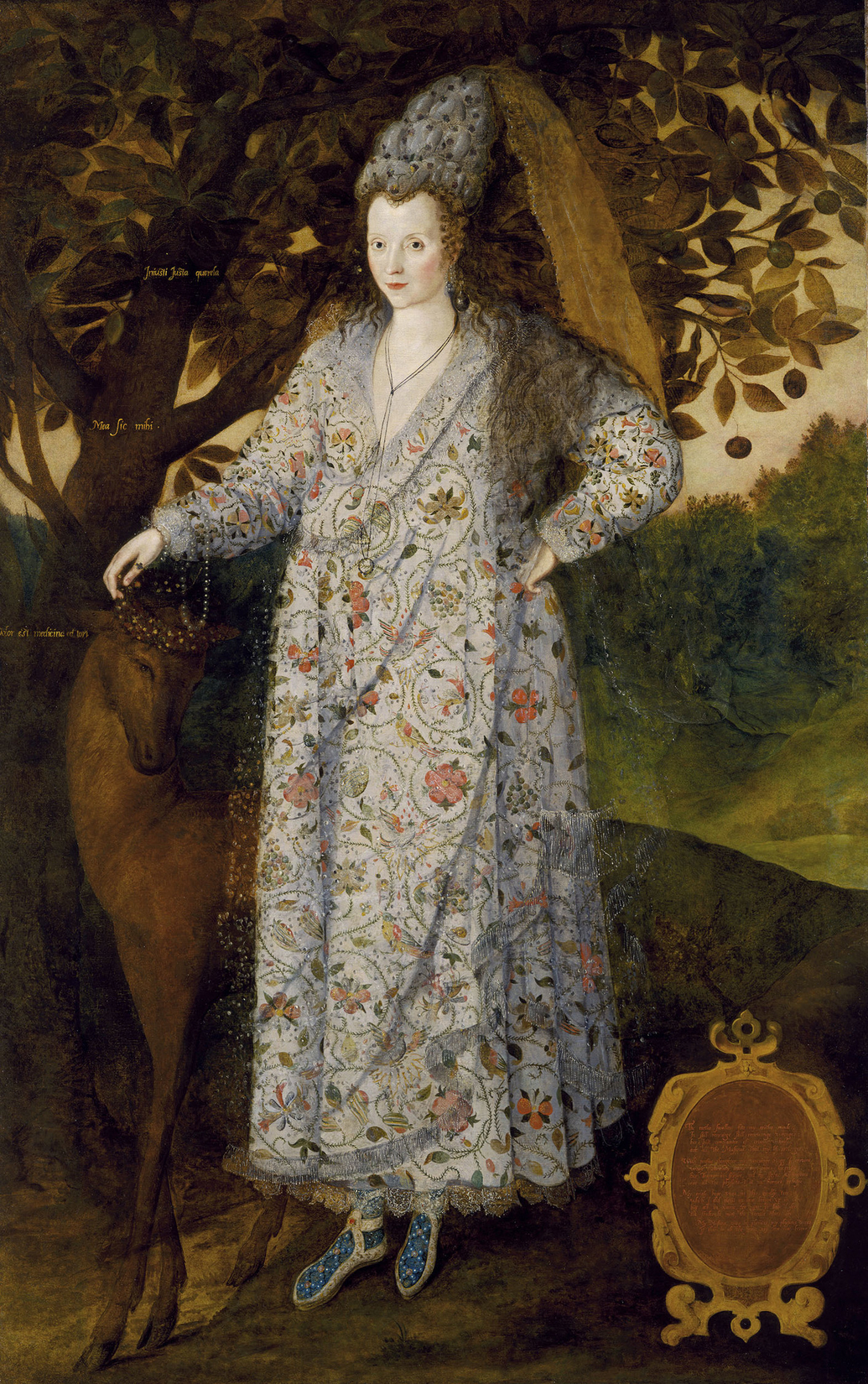
Portrait of an unknown woman in masque costume, associated with Aura Soltana, 1590s, RCT

Aura Soltana, also known as Ipolitan the Tartarian or Ipolita or Ippolyta (fl. 1569), was a Tartar woman at the court of Elizabeth I after arriving from Russia to England, apparently as a slave.

== Archival records ==
The sailor Anthony Jenkinson brought a young woman or child from Russia to England, who joined the court of Queen Elizabeth. She became known as "Ippolyta" or "Ipolitan the Tartarian."

In September 1559, Jenkinson wrote a letter in Moscow to a trading colleague thanking him for "my wench Aura Soltana". Richard Hakluyt identified this woman as "a young Tartar whiche he gave to the Queen afterward". Jenkinson wrote that the "price of a Nagayan Tartar slave" in Astrakhan was "a loaf of bread worth sixpence in England".

Subsequent records of the Elizabethan court mention "Ipolitan the Tartarian", who is identified by Bernadette Andrea and other scholars as the same person. From these sources, her identity seems to be formed and connected with international trade and the Muscovy Company, with the exchange of eastern silks and Russian furs.

She was christened on 13 July 1561 and the Queen gave her a gold chain and a gold tablet or locket. The gifts were made to "Ipolitan the Tartarian". There is no other evidence that Elizabeth was her godmother. In 1564 she was given livery clothes, listed in detail.

A pewter metal doll was bought for her to play with in 1562, and she was given gifts of lavish clothing, and some of the queen's old clothes. The doll, provided by a silkwoman, Alice Montague, was given to Kat Ashley suggesting that Ashley (who was probably acting as the Mother of the Maids) looked after Aura Soltana. Farthingale pins were bought for her, possibly suggesting her costume at court was much the same as other young women.

Several pairs of shoes were made by Garret Johnson for Aura Soltana, possibly indicating she was still growing. These included leather shoes, some made of Spanish leather, leather "pantobles", and velvet shoes and pantobles. As Elizabeth's own shoes recorded before this time were all made of velvet, the costume historian Janet Arnold suggested that the queen copied a fashion introduced by Ippolyta and bought Spanish leather shoes.

One of the latest records of Aura or Ipolyta at court was an order for the skinner Adam Bland to provide rabbit fur to her damask cloak in 1569.

== Costume in 1561 and 1564 ==
In May 1561, Elizabeth gave clothes to a "Tartarian woman", possibly Aura/Ippolyta or a companion. These included two loose gowns of black taffeta, a French kirtle of russet satin, and another French kirtle of black satin. The clothes had been made for the queen and discarded as gifts, a regular practice of the time.

The clothes given to "Ipolita the Tartarian" in June 1564 were specified in a warrant and most were listed again in a second document with prices. The cost of the clothes may be compared with the annual fees paid to aristocratic courtiers. The inclusion of imported materials connects her to the global exchange of luxury goods, and is a reminder of Jenkinson's role in the Persian silk trade. The garments specified and the fabrics are not unusual among the records of Elizabeth's wardrobe. The items were:

- A gown and a kirtle, of damask edged with velvet, lined with cotton fustian and linen
- A gown and kirtle of grosgrain chamlet edged with velvet
- A gown of cloth; a kirtle of grosgrain
- A petticoat of red cloth or grosgrain
- A farthingale of mockado
- 6 canvas smocks with Holland linen sleeves; 6 kerchiefs; 6 partlets with bands and ruffs; 4 pairs of Holland linen sleeves
- Half a pound of "systers" thread for making the smocks and kerchiefs
- 6 ounces of Granada silk thread to embroider the partlets and sleeves
- 5 ounces of Venice gold thread for other embroidery
- A "clout" of Spanish needles. The "clout" was a cloth to which needles were pinned.
- A scarf of sarcenet, (a fine translucent silk fabric).
- A velvet hat
- 2 cauls of gold, silver, and silk, costing £4.
