= Mockado =

Imitation velvet fabric

Mockado (also moquette, moucade) is a woollen pile fabric made in imitation of silk velvet from the mid-sixteenth century. Mockado was usually constructed with a woollen pile on a linen or worsted wool warp and woollen weft, although the ground fabric could be any combination of wool, linen, and silk. Mockado was used for furnishings and carpeting, and also for clothing such as doublets, farthingales, and kirtles.

Mockado was introduced to England from Flanders in the mid-sixteenth century. Dutch and Walloon weavers fleeing Spanish rule in the Low Countries were creating mockadoes and other fabrics combining silk and linen with combed woollens in the weaving center of Norwich by 1571. Varieties included plain, with an even pile, and "tuft" or voided mockado. Mockadoes were woven in solid or changeable colours, and were sometimes stamped with patterns in imitation of more expensive Utrecht velvets Mockado was always a rough fabric, and by the 1580s, the term "mockado" was synonymous with "inferior" or "tawdry". In discussing the old English tradition of new clothes at Easter, folklorist Peter Opie cites Thomas Lodge's 1596 pamphlet Wits Miserie :

"The farmer that was contented in times past with his Russet Frocke & Mockado sleeues, now sels a Cow against Easter to buy him silken geere for his Credit".

In the seventeenth century, the term mockado ends was used for a wool yarn, probably a worsted yarn similar to crewel yarn of that period, likely used for embroidery and making braids and fringes.

Mockadoes continued in use for furnishings such as wall hangings, chair covers, and stools, as well as carpeting. A patent was issued in England in 1741 for a "new invention of making carpeting commonly called French carpeting or Moccadoes and in France moucades or moquets."
