= Esther Inglis =

Scottish miniaturist

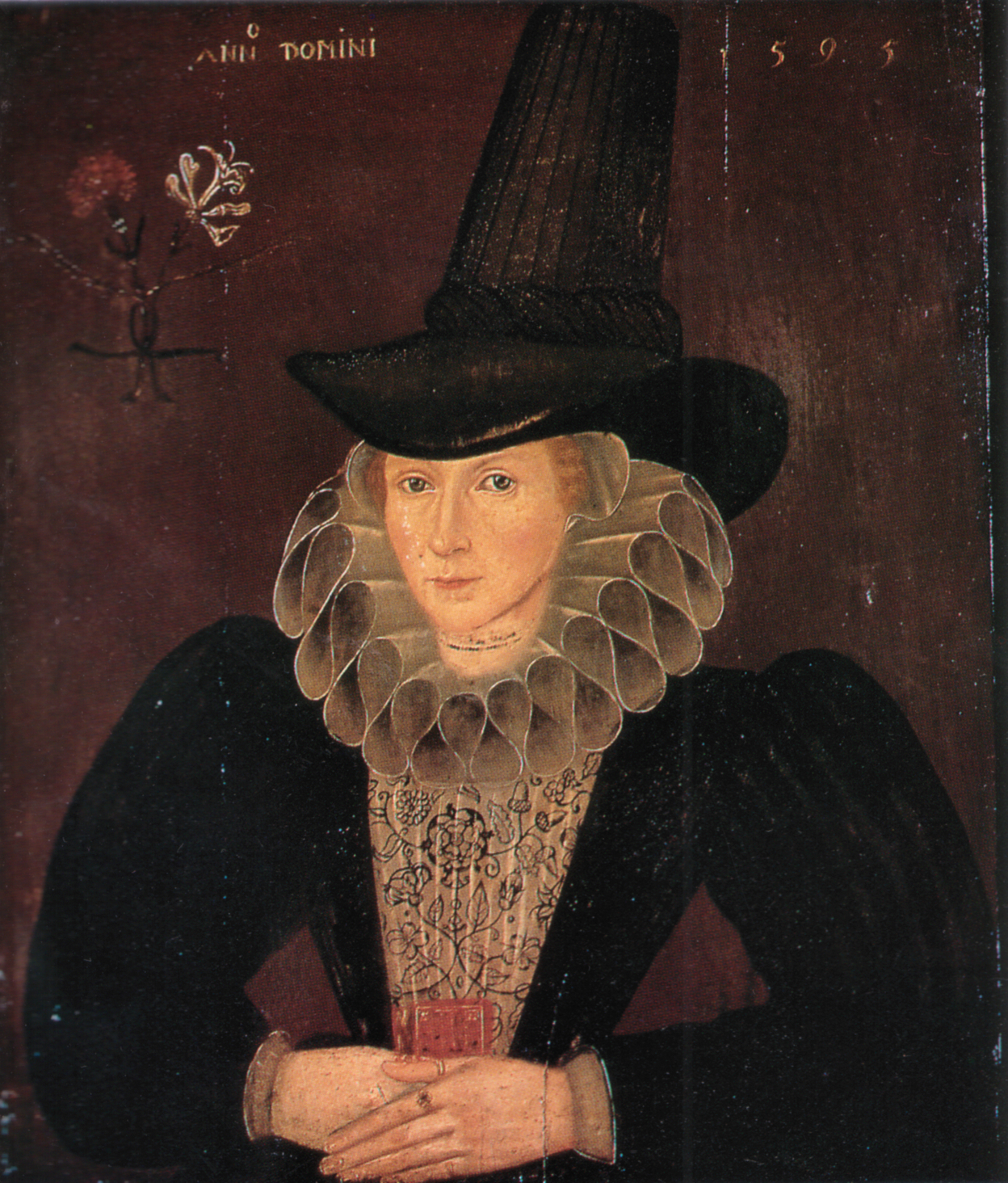
- Born: 1571
- Died: 1624 (aged 52–53); Edinburgh, Scotland
- Known for: Calligraphy, textiles

Esther Inglis (/ˈɛstər ˈɪŋɡlz/ EST-er ING-gəlz or /ˈɛstər ˈɪŋlz/ EST-er ING-əlz) (1571–1624) was a miniaturist and skilled in calligraphy, writing, and embroidering. She was born in 1571 in either London or in Dieppe and moved to Scotland, where she was raised and married. Sharing similarities with Jane Segar, Inglis always signed her work and frequently included portraits of herself in the act of writing. Inglis successfully established a career based on manuscript books created for royal patrons.Over the course of her life, Inglis completed around sixty miniature books that display her calligraphic skill with paintings, portraits, and embroidered covers. She mostly dedicated her books to the monarchs, Elizabeth I and James VI and I, and people in power during their reign. She died around 1624, at the age of 53.

== Early life ==
Inglis was born to Nicholas Langlois and Marie Pressot in 1571. Langlois was a schoolteacher who later became Master of the French School in Edinburgh, and Pressot was a skilled calligrapher. Both of her parents hailed from France, though it is uncertain as to when they moved to Edinburgh, Scotland. Some sources claim they moved around 1569 after fleeing from France as Protestant refugees, while others claim it was not until after the St. Bartholomew's Day Massacre around 1574. Some sources also claim that Langlois became Master of the French School in Edinburgh in 1574, while others claim it was not until around 1580. In March 1580 James VI gave Nicolas Langlois and Marie Pressot £80 Scots to help their debts, contracted two years earlier.

Langlois taught both oral and written forms of French, as well as scribal handwriting, upon which he received a lifetime annuity from King James VI after becoming Master of the French School in Edinburgh. He taught the daughters of the shoemaker Fremyn Alezard. Due to his knowledge and profession as a teacher, it is suspected that Inglis was educated by her father in the humanities. Also, due to her mother's skills in calligraphy, it is almost certain that Inglis learned her calligraphic skills from her. Though there is no written evidence, Inglis acknowledged her debt to her parents in one of her earliest manuscripts, Livret contenant diverses sortes de lettres, where she says: "Both parents having bidden me, a daughter has written, breaking the tedium of exile with her pen." Nicholas Langlois died around the year 1613 and his widow Marie Pressot continued to live in Edinburgh in a house rented from John Jackson. The town council agreed to pay her rent.

Inglis was very fortunate to have knowledgeable and skillful parents to teach her and offer her such an advanced education, and a father to assist her with her work. A few other early-modern women were educated through this form of advanced home schooling. The Morel household in France had drawn widespread admiration as an enclave of humanists, headed by diplomat and royal tutor Jean de Morel and the poet Antoinette de Loynes.

== Marriage and career ==
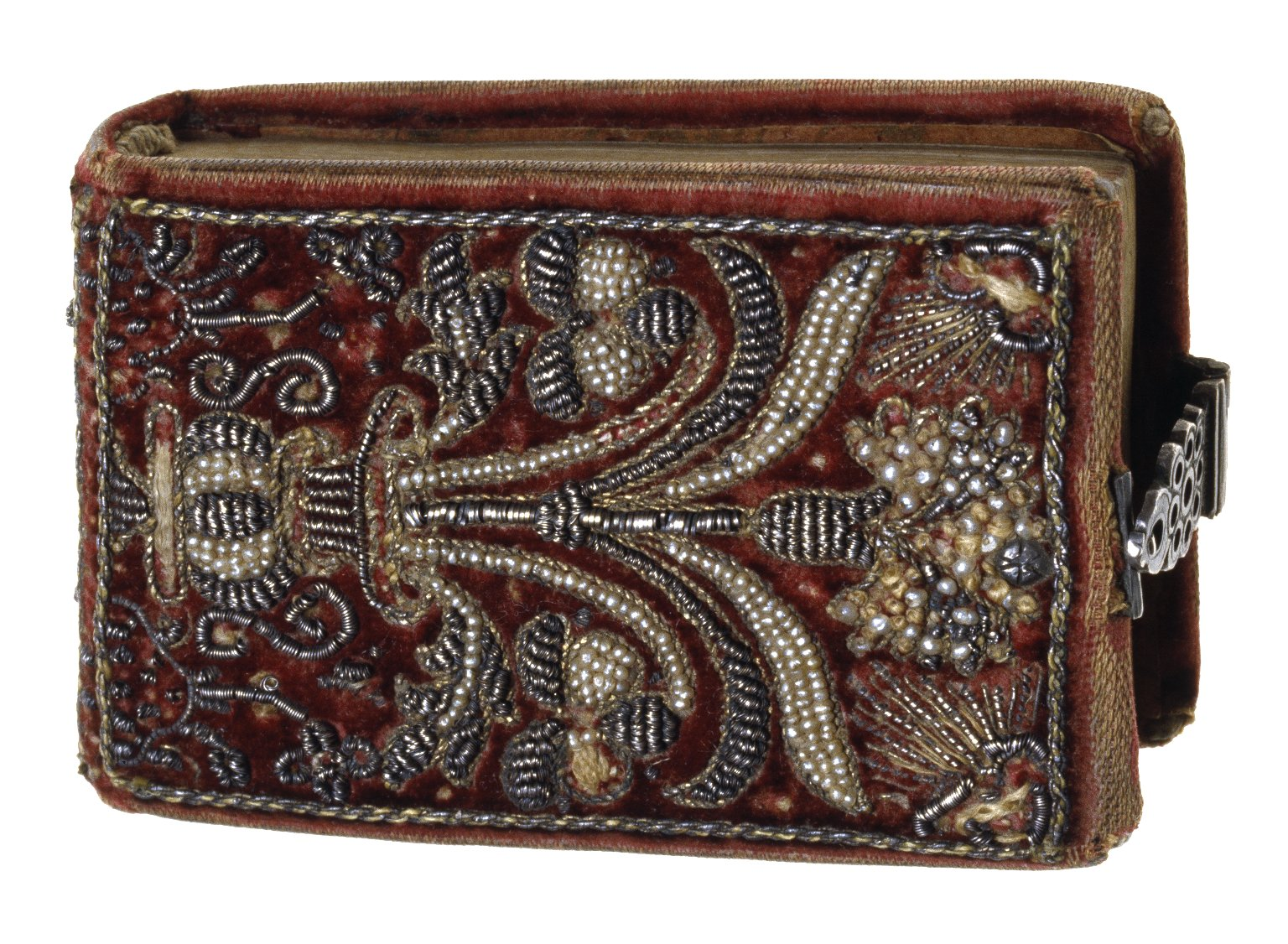
The cover of Argumenta psalmorum Davidis, embroidered by Inglis in 1608 (Folger Shakespeare Library, V.a.94)

Inglis's career was first managed by her father, who wrote dedicatory verses for her early books. After Inglis married Bartholomew Kello in 1596, a relation of Lord Holyroodhouse, he began to assist her instead. Kello sometimes wrote dedicatory letters and poems praising the recipients of Inglis's works, as well as Inglis herself, being so proud of her skills that he'd often sign himself as “husband of the book’s adorner” in the book. The marriage occurred after her "graduation" from her homeschooled lifestyle, which was a common theme among women intellectuals during this time period. Kello worked as a clerk for James VI's court, upon which Inglis seems to have worked as Kello's scribe, though other research seems to claim that King James VI employed both as scriveners. In a warrant to Kello from James VI, he states that "the said Barthilmo Kello is to write or cause all the said letters by his discretion be written BY THE MOST EXQUISITE WRITER WITHIN THIS REALM." This seems to indicate that Inglis would be able to produce the items as long as Kello oversaw her work.

Kello worked to provide various types of documents, such as passports, testimonials, and letters of recommendation. While Inglis produced these items for Kello, she also used her skills to produce a number of gift books. Kello was also in charge of delivering these documents, and upon delivering them, he would include a copy of the gift book from his wife, most likely hoping for a reward in return. Kello often used Inglis's books as a reason to travel abroad, similar to the way he used his trips as a messenger or information gatherer to present his wife's books and impose on his hosts for a reward. It was in these books that Inglis displayed her talents and skills, introducing impressive drawings on the title pages and establishing creative borders on each page of text. The manuscripts were said to be so magnificently made that they looked as if they were printed works, rather than being completely hand drawn. It was also around this time period that because print became more widely available as a growing technology, hand-made manuscripts were becoming more and more valuable. Among all of the manuscripts during this era, Inglis's books are important because they were very tiny in size, with the smallest manuscript measuring one and a half inches by two inches or two inches by three inches, such as the Argumenta Psalmorum Davidis of Plate 8, dedicated to Henry Frederick, Prince of Wales in 1608. Inglis is also one of the three women listed as painters in Scotland before 1700, along with Apollonia Kickius and Mrs Morris, in the biographical dictionary by Michael Apted and Susan Hannabuss.

Kello and Inglis were not only lovers, but they were also business colleagues. They lost an investment of £4,000 Scots in 1598 to the bankrupt royal financiers Thomas Foulis and Robert Jousie. Inglis acted as Kello's scribe for his work and in time he became her publicist and business manager. When James became the King of England, Kello and Inglis moved to Essex near London, and lived there from roughly 1606 to 1615 before returning to Edinburgh, where the two remained until Inglis's death in 1624. Upon moving to England, Kello and Inglis most likely had hoped to resume their work as a clerk and a scribe, but James had inherited a court from Queen Elizabeth, making this difficult. Kello also became Rector of Willingale in Essex in 1607 and later became Rector of Spexhall in Suffolk in 1620.

== Early manuscripts: 1605–1607 ==
The first manuscript that Inglis presented in England was dedicated to Susanna Herbert in February 1605, a person she did not know personally. The manuscript compiled excerpts of religious text, and decorative alphabets, and was in no doubt put together to demonstrate her skill as a calligrapher. Since Herbert had just only recently become Lady Herbert, it is possible that Inglis presented her with this manuscript hoping for a position in Herbert's household, as well as a reward for the manuscript itself.

After 1605, Inglis began approaching her dedicatees herself, rather than her husband doing it for her. In January 1606, Robert Sidney, Lucy Russell, Countess of Bedford, and Lady Erskine of Dirleton all received a New Year's Day gift book from Inglis. Like Herbert, all three of these people were strangers to Inglis, for she knew not one of them personally. Unlike the manuscript presented to Herbert however, these manuscripts showed a new style by Inglis. Her books were smaller and oblong in size, with each page of text illustrated with a colourful flower or a small bird. Her title pages also had flowered borders, and the oblong size of the books were unique, as they were never found in any other medieval manuscripts from this era. Just like the manuscript given to Herbert, these gift books were meant to display Inglis's skill as a calligrapher. Each page delivered a different style of handwriting, though there was no alphabet included as there was with the manuscript given to Herbert. Instead, there were colorful birds, flowers, or butterflies on the top of each page.

Inglis essentially used published books as a start for her own creativity. Artisans during this period typically copied text from other books by rewriting it with styled signatures and adding borders and such in the form of their own work. One common practice among artisans was to create multiple copies of the same book but include different dedications, with each addressing a different recipient. Another common theme amongst artisans during this time period was also to rewrite already-printed texts back into manuscript.

In July 1606, King Christian of Denmark came to England to visit. Chancellor Christianus Friis accompanied him, who was well known for his generosity. Because of this, Inglis prepared another flower illustrated manuscript specifically for Friis, probably hoping for a generous reward. This manuscript was mostly similar to the three New Year's gifts, though Inglis drew different flowers taken from another series, the Florae Deae. This series was supposedly immensely popular at this time, as the same flowers were later drawn on painted glass at Lydiard Park in Wiltshire, as well as other cities.

While Inglis did not appear to be a very inventive artist, she often presented herself as a highly skilled one, whose work was worth employing and collecting. She was also assertive in acknowledging her talents, often including text in her gifts that said "written and illuminated by me, Esther Inglis".

== Prince Henry's patronage: 1607–1614 ==
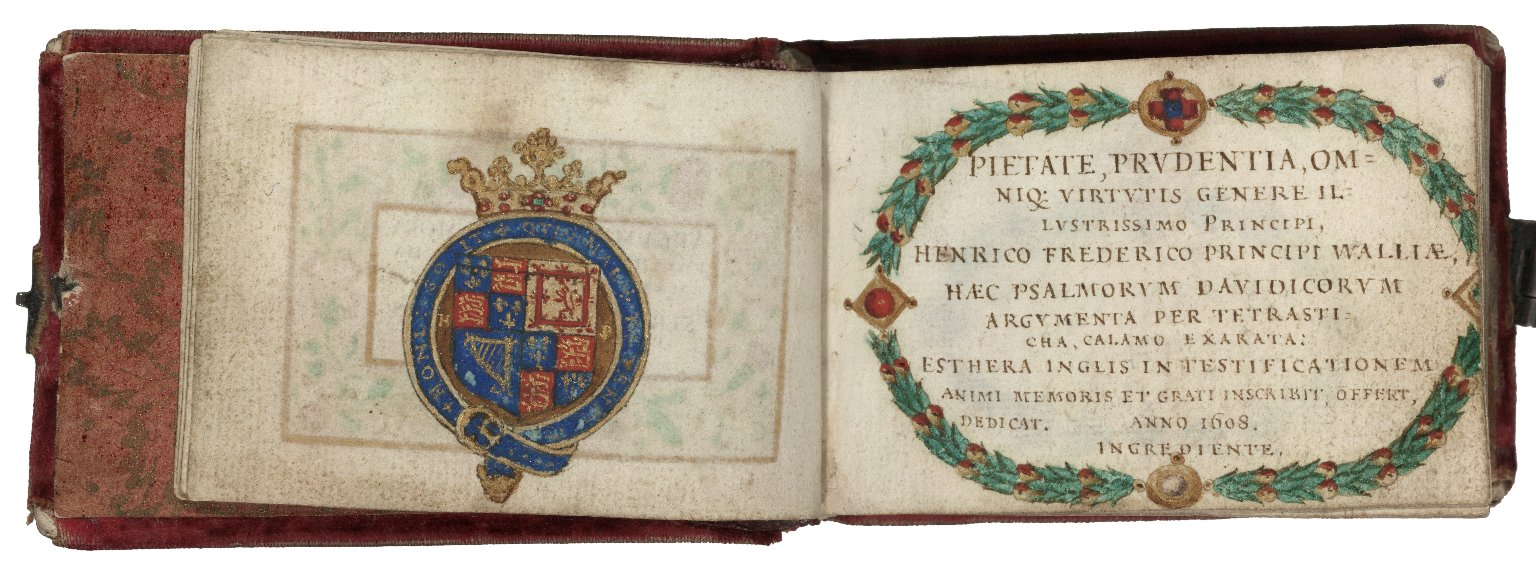
The dedicatory page of Argumenta psalmorum Davidis, to Prince Henry, 1608

Inglis mainly produced her flower-illustrated manuscripts in 1606 and 1607, with only a few exceptions, and began producing far less manuscripts in number after 1607. It is uncertain why, but some propose the idea that the illustrations were simply not as popular as they once were, or that they were too labour-intensive to keep producing continually. There's also the idea that Inglis could have possibly found patronage at Prince Henry's court. Combined with her husband's stipend, this may have offered them enough financial stability to not have to produce such illustrated manuscripts, or even many manuscripts at all. From 1607 to 1614, Inglis produced only eight manuscripts that are known of, with five of them being dedicated to either Prince Henry or to Sir David Murray. Also, Inglis rarely approached other patrons during this time period, thus providing further evidence to the idea that she had found some type of patronage in Henry's household, and therefore no longer needed to produce such works, or even display her artistic skills for advertisement.

== Flower illustration theories ==
Inglis's use of flowers in her work was primarily used to produce attractive manuscripts, which would create employment or reward opportunities. However, this may not have been the only reason Inglis decided to implement flowers. In many of her dedications, Inglis emphasized the fact that what she was doing was "a woman’s work". This shows that she was aware of the position she was in as woman in a patriarchal society. As a woman, she was limited in her choice of texts, which is most likely why she concentrated mostly on biblical or devotional texts.

There is also the theory that she used flowers in her works to portray a type of symbolism, with each flower representing something in particular. In an independent portrait of her, made in 1595, a small knot of flowers can be seen in the top left-hand corner. Composed of lavender sprigs and carnations, this symbolizes love and chastity, and it wasn't but a year later than Inglis became married to Kello. However, there is no substantial evidence to support this theory.

== Personalisation of books ==
Early in her career, before her signature flower-themed manuscripts, Inglis drew her inspiration from the designs of printed books, often copying engraved title borders, ornaments, and initials. Two of what are considered her most beautiful books from this period are the C.L. Psaumes de David, dedicated to Prince Maurice of Nassau in 1599, and Le Livre de l'Ecclesiaste, dedicated to the Viomtesse de Rohan in 1601. Both works combine elements from a variety of sources, which all work together to create gift books with the character and personality of the recipient in mind. For example, in the book given to Prince Maurice lies a drawing of a corslet, shield, and weapons, quite fitting for the Prince who spent most of his time in the field fighting for the Protestant cause. Although it does not appear that all of Inglis's books are designed in such ways for the recipient, it does seem that this was the case for these two books.

It was not until later in her career that Inglis began drawing in color and illustrating different flowers, fruits, or small animals that often appeared in the borders of Flemish manuscripts. Even later in her career, she turned back to developing recreated printed books, including reproducing fifty-one of the Emblemes ou devises chrestiennes by Georgette de Montenay for Prince Charles.

Although creative borders and colorful illustrations were part of Inglis's technique, she also embroidered her work. Inglis produced jewel-like covers for her royalty works, usually embroidered with seed pearls and gold and silver thread on red velvet. The cover of each book complements her books' interior display of skilled calligraphic style, title pages, self-portraits, ornaments, ink drawings, and emblems.

== Protestant involvement ==
Inglis' parents were practicing Protestants, and they left their home in France during the Protestant persecutions, which makes it likely that Inglis was raised Protestant as well. Inglis and her husband were known to be supporters of the Protestant religion. Many of Inglis's books were even given as gifts to members of the Protestant community around Elizabeth I and James VI.

Out of around sixty different manuscripts that have been identified as the work of Inglis, most are copies of Protestant religious texts. These manuscripts included psalms from the Geneva Bible, as well as other versions of the bible, verses from the Proverbs and Ecclesiastes, and the Quatrains of Guy Du Faur, Seigneur de Pibrac, and Octonairs of Antoine de la Roche Chandieu, two renowned French sixteenth-century religious writers.

== Children ==
Esther Inglis had five children, including her daughters Marie and Elizabeth. Her eldest son Samuel was educated at the University of Edinburgh. In June 1620, Inglis wrote to King James hoping he could get her son a fellowship at Oxford or Cambridge. Samuel Inglis succeeded his father as Rector of Spexhall in Suffolk during his lifetime, and possibly against his will.

Two sons, Isaac and Joseph, are buried in Willingale Church, Essex, where their father Bartholomew was rector. Two brass plaques in the chancel, dated 1614, commemorate them with a simple epitaph.

== In literature ==
Inglis is given voice in David Kinloch's Scots lyrical monologue Esther (2025).
