= Lord Dirleton =

Lord Dirleton can refer to:

- Lord Haliburton of Dirleton, a title in the Peerage of Scotland
- Lord Erskine of Dirleton, a title in the Peerage of Scotland
- John Nisbet, Lord Dirleton (c. 1609–1687), Scottish judge
