= Sir John Arnot =

Scottish merchant and landowner (1530–1616)

John Arnot of Birswick (Orkney) (1530–1616) was a 16th-century Scottish merchant and landowner who served as Lord Provost of Edinburgh from 1587 to 1591 and from 1608 to death. He was Deputy Treasurer to King James VI.

== Career ==
He was born in 1530 the son of William Arnot and his wife, Margaret Wallace. At the Reformation of 1560 the family converted to Protestantism.

In August 1574 he submitted a petition to the English ambassador Henry Killigrew who was returning to London. He wanted redress for a cargo of textiles from Flanders. He was tricked by English pirates off Great Yarmouth, led by William Hudson of Colchester, who pretended to be searching for pirates. They stole his own clothes as well as a stock of fabric including velvets, the most costly being a figured black velvet, gold and silver thread, silk thread, gold and silver passementerie, and various silk chamlets and Spanish taffetas. Arnot mentioned that he had talked with Killigrew at Glamis Castle, but was now ill with the Flanders sickness.

In 1587 he succeeded William Little as Provost of Edinburgh. When Francis Stewart, 5th Earl of Bothwell murdered William Stewart of Monkton in July 1588, Arnot's men captured Lord Maxwell who had escaped from Robert Gourlay's house on the High Street.

Arnot and William Fairlie issued a pass for shipwrecked sailors from the Spanish Armada in October 1588. The 46 men had been crew or soldiers of the Ballanzara, (La Trinidad Valencera) wrecked in Ireland. They were to be allowed passage to Spain via Scottish merchant ships going to France.

== Edinburgh and the royal marriage ==
He agreed as a burgh commissioner for Edinburgh with Alexander Oustean at the Convention of Royal Burghs to the raising a tax for the royal marriage. On 28 May 1589 Arnot and the baillies of Edinburgh and others came to Holyrood House and protested to the Chancellor, John Maitland of Thirlestane that the king should marry a Danish princess, despite delays and opposition from a pro-English faction.

James VI sailed to Norway to meet his bride, Anne of Denmark. On 19 February 1590 James VI wrote from Kronborg in Denmark to the kirk minister Robert Bruce and asked him to ensure the Provost prepared four ships for his return to Scotland, and provide craftsmen for William Schaw to finish repairs to Holyrood Palace. The town council organised a ceremony of welcome for his bride Anne of Denmark on 19 May.

Arnot personally contributed napery and £100 to a banquet given by the burgh to the Danish ambassador, which was held in the lodging of Thomas Acheson, master of the mint, at the foot of Todrig's Wynd on 24 May.

== Edinburgh and the crown in the 1590s ==
In July 1590 Arnot and Oustean as commissioners for the burgh of Edinburgh contracted to borrow from the Comptroller of Scotland, David Seton of Parbroath, the sum of £100,000 Scots and pay the king £4000 yearly. In April 1594 they were required to repay the remainder of the loan to the comptroller in order to pay the expenses of resisting the rebel Francis Stewart, 5th Earl of Bothwell.

Arnot wrote to the former ambassador from England, William Ashby in April 1590, about the loss of a cargo to pirates some years previously. He wanted to revive his claim for redress and his son-in-law in London planned to make a claim to Queen Elizabeth, and Arnot hoped Ashby could help.

On 26 October 1591 Arnot was appointed to a commission to try, examine, and if required torture people suspected of witchcraft. The other appointees were Sir John Cockburn of Ormiston, David MacGill of Nesbit, Robert Bruce, John Duncanson, and William Litill, then Provost of Edinburgh.

On 29 May 1593 the Privy Council asked Edinburgh council to pay him £10,000 Scots in part repayment of money lent by him by the king, from the town's tax bill. Arnot received a further £4170 from the interest on Anne of Denmark's dowry. In 1594 Arnot supplied wine and beer to the ambassadors who had come for the baptism of Prince Henry, advanced money for the royal households, and lent money to the royal mint. James VI gave him a valuable gold cup in security for repayment, and the income from crown lands in Orkney and Shetland and from lands at Cockburnspath.

== English comedians in Edinburgh ==
In April 1598 a group of actors or comedians came to Edinburgh to perform. Arnot made representations to an English diplomat George Nicholson, that the players scorned James VI and the Scottish people and ought to be stopped in the case the "worst sort", the Edinburgh mob, were stirred up to riot. James VI supported another group of actors, in November 1599, against the church and town authorities who tried to close them down, on religious and moral grounds. This group included Martin Slater and Lawrence Fletcher.

== Later career ==
In 1604 he was appointed Treasurer-depute of Scotland, under the Lord Treasurer, George Home, 1st Earl of Dunbar.

The King's Advocate in Scotland, Sir Thomas Hamiliton discovered a vein of silver on his lands at Hilderston in June 1606. The yield seemed promising, and in January 1608, King James ordered John Arnot, as treasurer-depute, to take charge of the mine.

In 1608 he (or possibly his son) served a second term as Provost of Edinburgh, in succession to Alexander Seton.

In 1609, during his second term as Provost, he was found innocent of any complicity in the Gowrie plot. At this time it is clear that he acquired some of the lands forfeited by Robert Logan of Restalrig including lands at North Berwick and possibly also Lochend House (which would have served as his Edinburgh residence).

As treasurer of Scotland, Arnot was instructed by the Lords Auditors to pay money owing to Finlay Taylor of the Canongate and Euphame Douchall, who was the widow of Thomas Fenton, keeper of His Majesty's pets at Holyrood. They claimed expenses for dressing the little garden at Holyrood Palace in 1611.

He died in 1614 aged 83 (some records state 1616 which would make him 85). At death he left an estate of around £20,000 (around £2 million in modern terms).

The 1616 death makes more sense in terms of the succession of Lord Provosts as, not until 1616, does William Nisbet of Dean fill the role as the next Lord Provost, yet at age 83/85 Sir John's death could not be described as unexpected.

The names "John Arnot" and "James Arnot" and "John Nesbit" appear with others on a poetry manuscript in the Laing collection at the University of Edinburgh and it is thought the manuscript was made for a group of prominent Edinburgh burgesses.

== Family ==
He married twice: firstly to Margaret Craig of Riccarton, daughter of Thomas Craig of Riccarton. They had two daughters, Rachel and Marion.

Margaret Craig had a financial interest in lead mining. She was part-owner, with John and Robert Johnsoun, of lead ore produced under a royal lease by the Earl of Atholl and George Douglas of Parkhead. The lead ore was taken to Leith and stored in a cellar belonging to John Dalmahoy. There was a disagreement in 1574, and Helen Barron, the wife of Robert Johnsoun, put new locks on the cellar. Regent Morton asked them to share their rights to a third part of the ore.

After Margaret Craig's death in 1615 Arnot married Helen Johnston, and had one further daughter, Helen or Helena Arnot (1568-1650). Helen married Sir George Hume or Home of Manderston. George Home owed Sir John £14,000 but was apparently upset at receiving nothing in his will. The relationship between George and Helen deteriorated to the point that she was accused of witchcraft against him in 1629/1630. Not surprisingly she divorced him in November 1630.

His daughter Marion Arnot married James Nisbet (1557-1621), a son of Henry Nisbet of Dean and brother of William Nisbet of Dean. Marion Arnot inherited Lochend House at Restalrig from her father. James Nisbet was known as James Nisbet of Restalrig after the marriage.

His sister Rachel Arnot (died 1626) married the Edinburgh burgess, Archibald Johnston of Warriston, ancestor of the future Lord Provost Sir Patrick Johnston.

Some sources describe James Arnot, an Edinburgh merchant, as his son. James Arnot acquired Fast Castle, and sold it to Mary Sutton, Countess of Home in 1620. She sold the castle to Harry Stewart.

It is thought that Alexander Home of North Berwick, Provost of Edinburgh from 1593 to 1597, was an in-law or cousin.
