= John Nisbet, Lord Dirleton =

Scottish judge

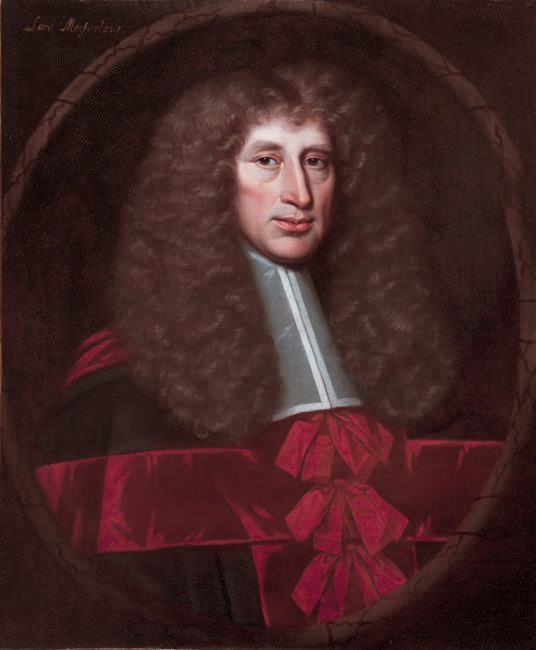
John Nisbet, Lord Dirleton (John Scougal, ca. 1682)

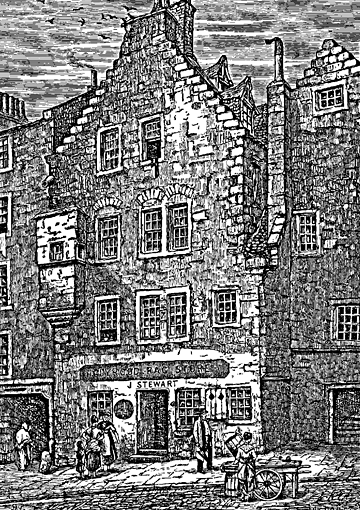
Nisbet of Dirleton's house on the Canongate

John Nisbet, Lord Dirleton (c. 1609–1687) was a Scottish judge remembered for his prosecution of the Covenanters.

== Life ==
He was the son of Sir Patrick Nisbet, Lord Eastbank, a Lord of Session, in turn son of Henry Nisbet of Dean, Lord Provost of Edinburgh in 1597.

John Nisbet was admitted as an advocate in 1633, and he was sheriff-depute of Edinburghshire from 1639.

In 1634 he acted for John Toash, the master of household to James Crichton of Frendraught. He was accused of burning down Frendraught Castle. Nisbet argued successfully that the case against Toash was disproved by the conviction of another suspect, John Meldrum. He defended James Graham, 1st Marquess of Montrose in 1641. He was appointed Lord Advocate and raised to the bench with the judicial title Lord Dirleton in 1664. He severely persecuted the Covenanters. He was a commissioner for the union of Scotland and England in 1670, and was forced to resign his position as Lord Advocate in 1677. In 1663, he purchased the estate of Dirleton, in East Lothian, which included Dirleton Castle, and constructed Archerfield House not far distant.

His Edinburgh townhouse was on the Canongate at the head of Reid's Close, built in 1624 by his father, and distinguished by a square turret projecting over the pavement.

== Publications ==
He was author of the legal work "Law Doubts" also known as "Dirleton's Doubts".

== See also ==
John Nisbet of Hardhill

Legal offices
Preceded by Sir John Fletcher	Lord Advocate; 1664-1677	Succeeded by Sir George Mackenzie
