= George Elphinstone =

Scottish landowner and courtier (d. 1634)

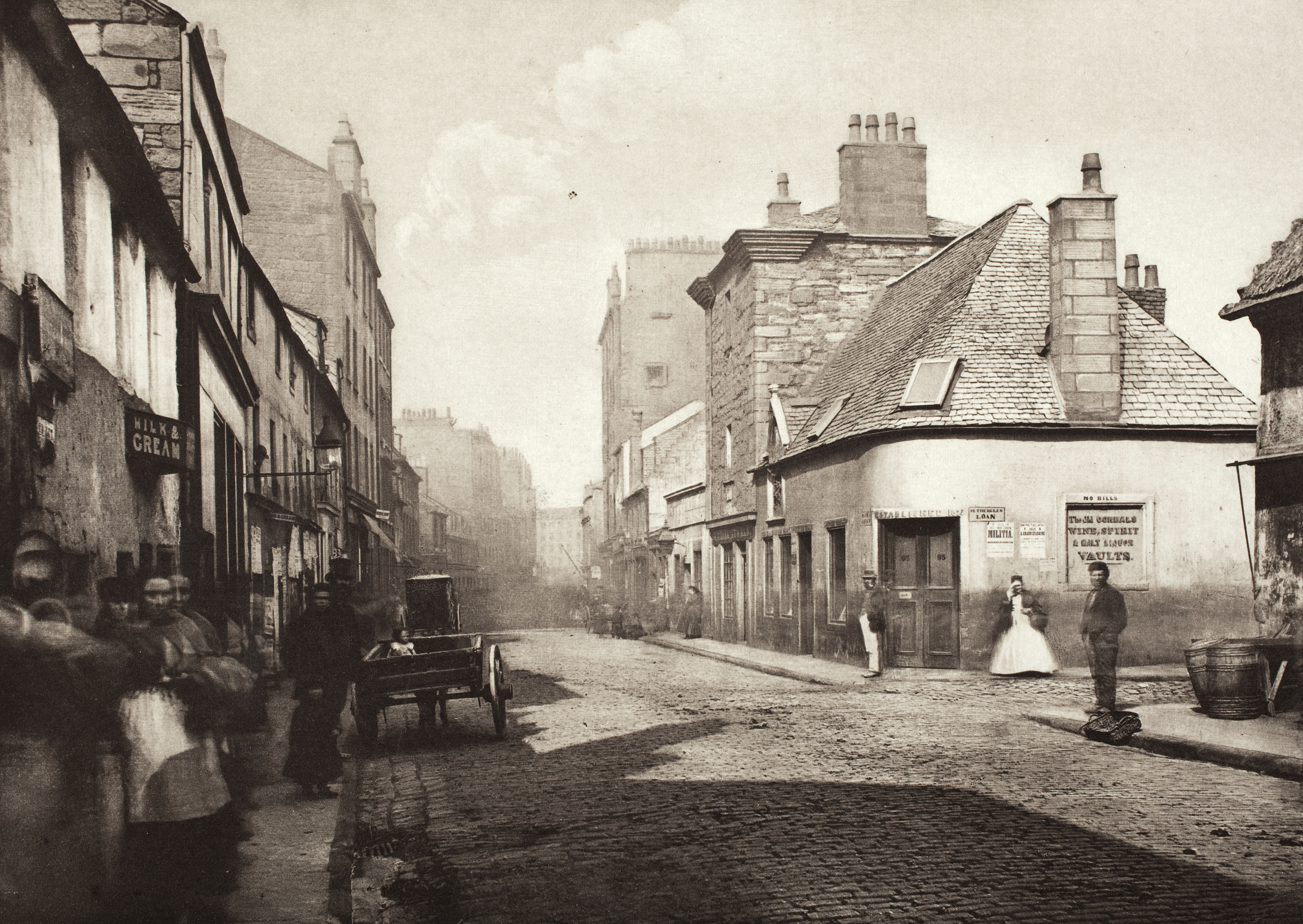
Main Street, Gorbals, with the Elphinstone Tower, 1868, Thomas Annan

George Elphinstone of Blythswood (died 1634) was a Scottish landowner, courtier, and Provost of Glasgow.

== Life ==
George Elphinstone was the son of George Elphinstone of Blythswood (died 2 April 1585), a leading Glasgow merchant and shipowner, and Marion Scott.

He was knighted during the celebrations at the baptism of Prince Henry at Stirling Castle on 30 August 1594. He was made a gentleman of the king's bedchamber in 1596. In this role he controlled the access to James VI of Scotland allowed to the English diplomatic agent, George Nicholson, occasionally bringing him secretly into the king's cabinet at Holyroodhouse.

He was a member of a "knot of friendship" at the Scottish court that included the Secretary, Sir George Home, Sir Robert Kerr, the younger Sir Robert Melville, and Sir David Murray. These chamber servants paid for the baptism of Princess Margaret in April 1599, because they had displaced the treasurer Walter Stewart of Blantyre.

Elphinstone's popularity with the king helped the career of his sister Egidia's husband, James Sempill of Beltrees, a young diplomat and administrator who became involved in the Secret correspondence of James VI that would help put James on the throne of England.

George Elphinstone had connections with the Western Isles and Ireland and was involved in negotiations between the West and the court. In October 1598, his mistress was mentioned as a recipient of diplomatic gifts from Sorley Boy MacDonnell, along with himself, the king, Anne of Denmark, and Beatrix Ruthven.

In November 1599 George Elphinstone looked after a group of English comedians in Edinburgh. He was given money to buy timber to set up their stage, and in December gave them the king's reward of £333-6s-8d Scots. The actors included Lawrence Fletcher and Martin Slater. Edinburgh's kirk session attempted to prevent the performances, despite a royal warrant. Martin Slater later gained the patronage of Anne of Denmark's brother, Ulrik, Duke of Holstein and set up the Red Bull Theatre in London.

Elphinstone married Agnes Boyd, daughter of Thomas Boyd, Lord Kilmarnock, and Marion Campbell in August 1600. As a wedding gift James VI gave her a gold chain necklace and a gold belt set with pearls, and a pair of matching gold "garnishings" set with pearl to wear in her hair, worth £580 Scots. After spending a weekend in Glasgow with the newly weds at the end of August, James VI gave Elphinstone land in the New Park of Partick to build a better house to entertain him in the next time.

Elphinstone was a servant of the Duke of Lennox, and in September 1600 Lennox and the king nominated him Provost of Glasgow. His achievements as Provost include the 1605 Letter of Guildry, which established a merchant's guild with its Dean of Guild, a Deacon Convenor of the Crafts, and a Visitor of the Maltmen. He gained the enmity of the town council in 1608 when he claimed customs income from the town's market and bridge.

One of the Elphinstone residences was on the site of 87–89 Main Street, Gorbals. In the nineteenth century the remaining buildings consisted of a small tower and an adjacent lodging with seventeenth-century decorative plasterwork on the ceiling of the upper storey.

== William Elphinstone ==
George Elphinstone's younger brother Sir William Elphinstone was the secretary of Elizabeth Stuart, Queen of Bohemia. In 1613 he argued with Hans Meinhard von Schönberg over cost-cutting measures in Elizabeth's household and resigned his post as secretary. In 1626 he was a promoter of the colonial schemes of William Vaughan in Newfoundland at Cambriol. He was cup-bearer to Charles I, Lord Justice General in Scotland (1635-1641), and knighted at Whitehall in February 1637. He and the Bishop of Galloway were targeted by protesters against the new prayer book on 18 October 1637. He was buried in Westminster Abbey in December 1645. He left his estate to the architect and courtier, David Cunningham of Auchenharvie.

== Family ==
The children of George Elphinstone and Agnes Boyd included;

- James Elphinstone
