= John Duncanson (minister) =

Scottish minister (c.1530–1601)

John Duncanson (ca. 1530–1601) was a Scottish minister, one of the Roman Catholic clergymen who willingly converted to the Protestant doctrines during the Reformation. He was reputed to have lived to be nearly 100 years old. He was elected President of St Leonard's College, St Andrews in 1556, around the time he accepted the reformed faith. He held this position until 1566. He was also the minister at Stirling in 1560.

He relinquished the charge about 1571. He was the King's Minister tutor and chaplain to King James VI from 1567 through 1580 and Moderator of the General Assembly of the Church of Scotland in 1574 and 1576.

In 1584, when he was upwards of eighty years of age, he was concerned with the so-called “treasonable proceedings of the Earls of Angus and Mar, the Master of Glammis, with their colleagues and accomplices, and for reception, support, intercommuning, and defence of the said persons and their associates in the said treasonable act committed in the month of April last bypast". The treasonable act referred to was their seizing and holding of the castle and town against the King (James VI), whence they issued a proclamation declaring that their only object in seizing arms was to deliver the King from evil counsellors (Earl of Arran and others). The Earl is said to be Provost of Stirling at this time. John Duncanson must have been very active, because he was, along with others, excluded from the remission, pardon, and protection granted by the King to the “bailies, councillors, community, and inhabitants, with their wives and children".

On 26 October 1591 Duncanson was appointed to a commission to try, examine, and, if required, torture people suspected of witchcraft. Other appointees were Sir John Cockburn of Ormiston, David MacGill of Nesbit, Robert Bruce, William Litill, then Provost of Edinburgh, and John Arnot.

== Biographical data ==
As minister of the burgh, Duncanson had a manse assigned to him by the Town Council on 31 October 1560. He was appointed by the Assembly on 27 June 1563, in conjunction with another, to plant kirks in Menteith and was then appointed minister of the King's House (or Dean of the Chapel Royal of Stirling). He demitted his parochial charge after 16 January 1571. He was subsequently presented to the Vicarage of the Chapel Royal on 17 March 1567 then later demitted the post before 25 January 1574, on appointment to the Sub-Deanery. He was elected Moderator of the General Assembly on 7 August 1574, also Commissioner of Galloway, and was appointed with others to draw up the Second Book of Discipline in 1576 and 1578. He died on 4 October 1601, aged about 100.

== Publications ==
He wrote a Reply to Tyrie, the Jesuit's Refutation of Knox's Answer to a former work, which was appointed to be revised by the General Assembly in March 1673.

== Family ==
He married:

- (1) Janet Watson
- (2) Margaret Kenzow, who survived him. He had issue –
  - James, minister of Alloa, Clackmannanshire, who married Helen Livingston;
  - William, apprenticed to Harry Smith, cutter, Edinburgh, 31st Jan. 1593;
  - Walter, apprenticed to Robert Middleton, tailor, Edinburgh, 4 March 1594–5;
  - Marion (married Alexander Hume, minister of Logie).

== Bibliography ==
- Calderwood's Hist., iii. 187, 330, 344 passim, iv. 191 passim
- Records of Royal Burgh of Stirling, 1519–1666, 75, 76
- Reg. of Deeds, xxiii., 232
- Acts and Dec, lv., 49
- Rogers's The Chapel Royal of Stirling, 56 et seq.
