= William Little (Lord Provost) =

Scottish merchant and landowner (1525-1601)

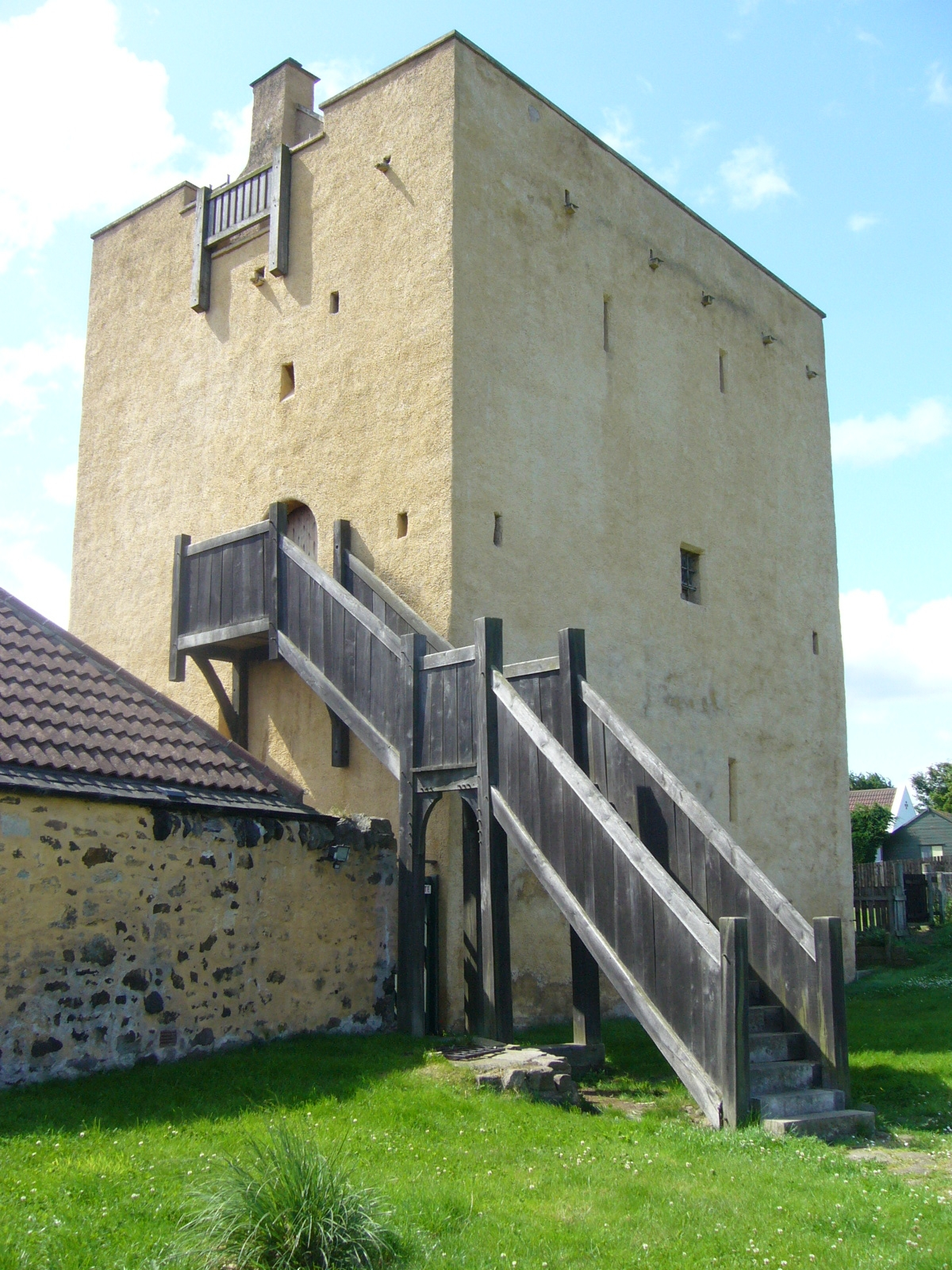
Liberton Tower

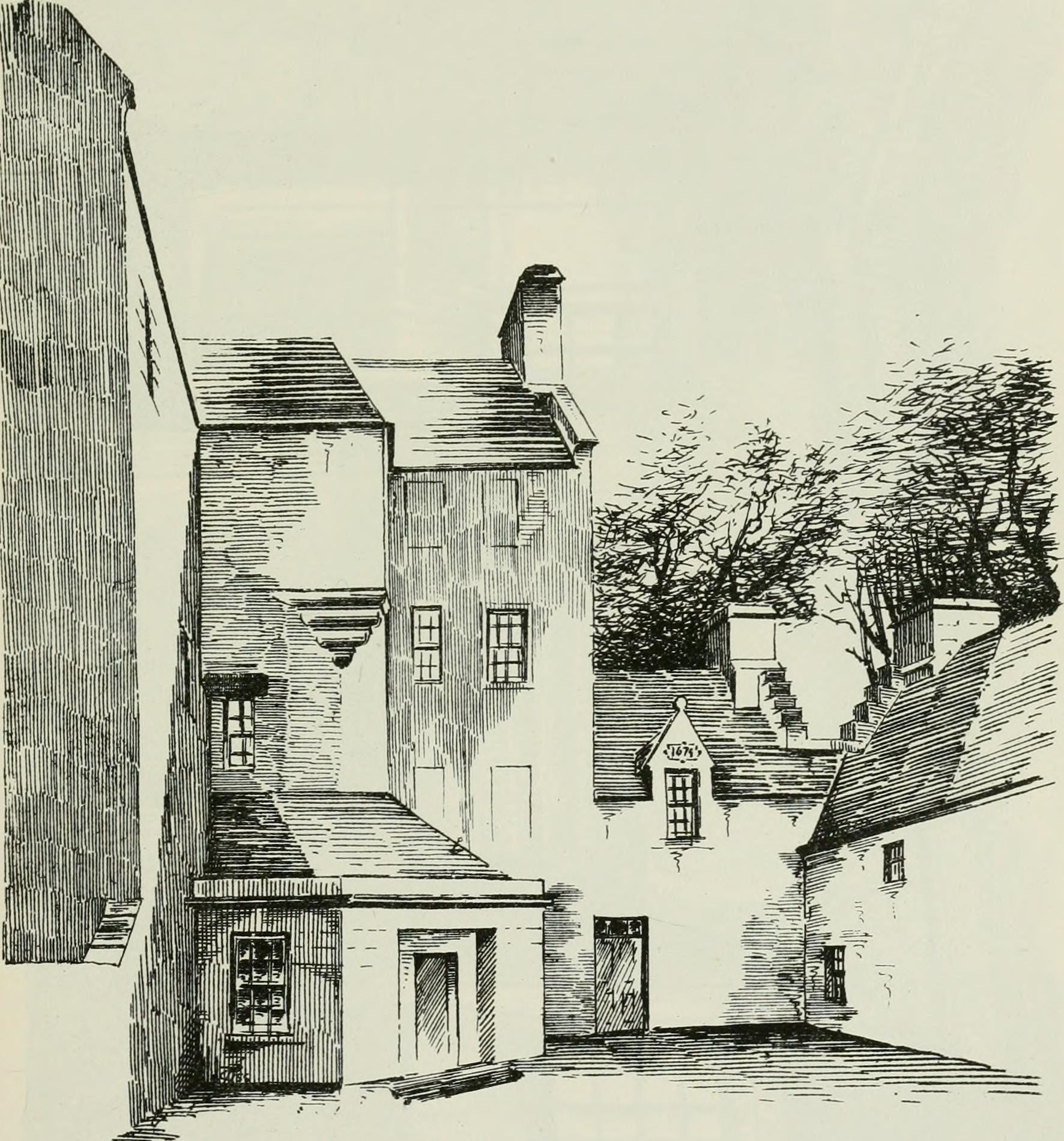
Liberton House

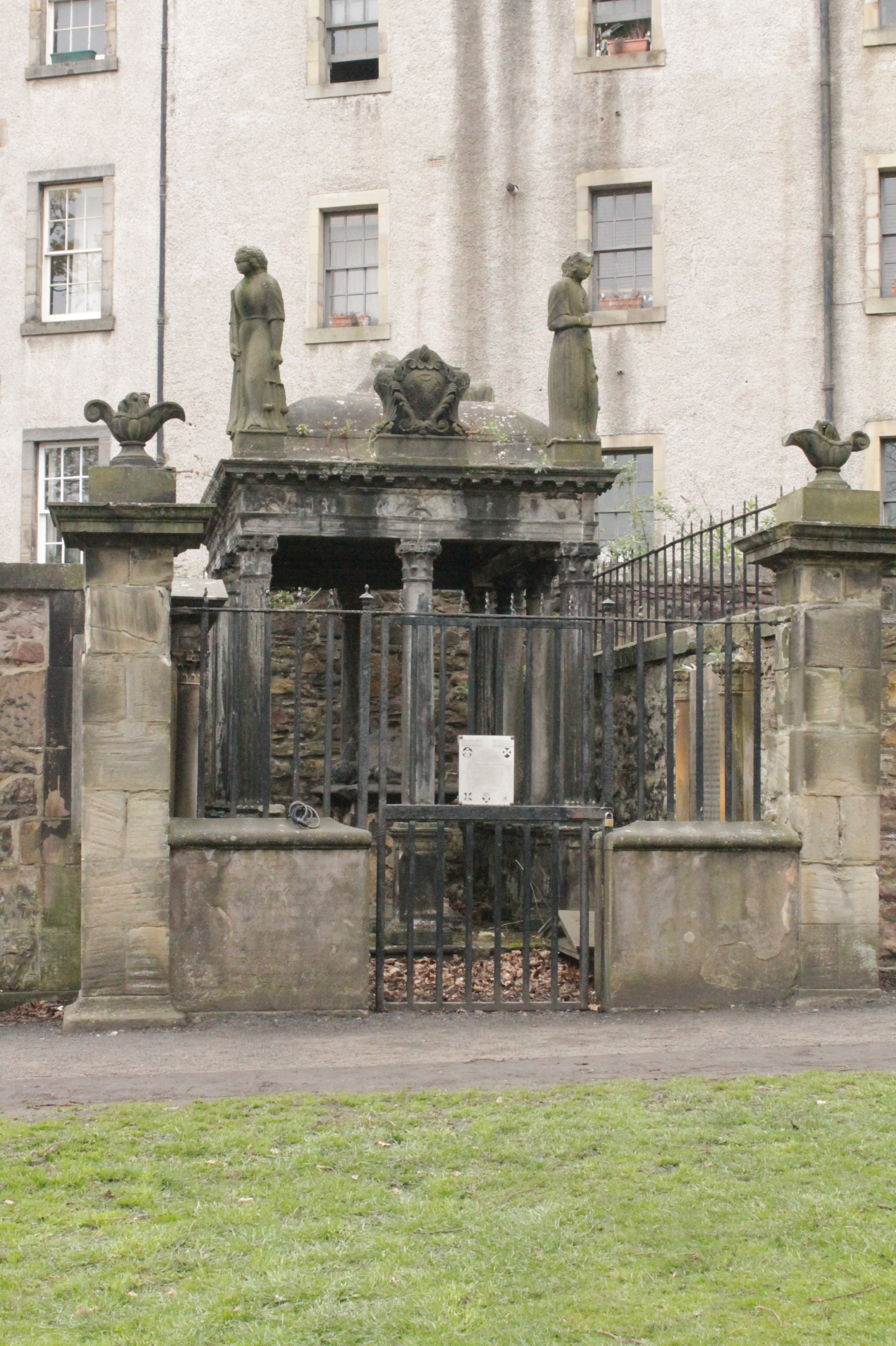
William Little mausoleum, Greyfriars Kirkyard

William Little (or Littil) of Liberton (1525–1601) was a 16th-century Scottish merchant and landowner who served as Lord Provost of Edinburgh 1586/87 and 1591/92. He was one of the founders of Edinburgh University.

== Life ==
He was born in 1525 the son of an Edinburgh merchant and city burgess Clement Little or Littil. He was descended from Edward Little who came to Edinburgh around 1500 as a cloth merchant.

At the Reformation of 1560 the family converted to Protestantism.

In 1582 Little was one of the founders of Edinburgh University on the site of Kirk o'Field Church. His benefaction included donation of 300 legal books previously owned by his older brother Clement Little, an advocate who died in 1580. These books created the foundation of the Edinburgh University Library. The site of the original university remains in university use but was redeveloped in the late 18th century as Old College.

He was a city burgess in the 1580s and in 1586 succeeded James Stewart, Earl of Arran as Provost. He was replaced in turn from 1587 to 1591 by John Arnot of Birswick, before serving a second term as Provost 1591 to 1592, thereafter being succeeded by Nicol Uddert.

In 1587 he purchased Liberton Tower from the Forrester family of Corstorphine, but found it unsuited to his needs and instead built Liberton House nearby around 1600. Liberton House contains a lintel inscribed "William Litil 1570" brought from an earlier house (probably in the Scottish Borders).

On 26 October 1591 Little was appointed to a commission to try, examine, and if required torture people suspected of witchcraft. The others appointees were Sir John Cockburn of Ormiston, David MacGill of Nesbit, Robert Bruce, John Duncanson, and John Arnot.

He died on 24 November 1601. He was buried in the then relatively new Greyfriars Kirkyard in Edinburgh. Greyfriars Kirk was at that time still unbuilt and the ground was for burial only. Little and others such as George Buchanan were some of the graves removed in a purge of monuments in the early 17th century, and stones were thereafter banned in the main grass areas. The new rules only allowed monuments on the outer wall, and this is where Little's descendant, also William Little applied in 1680 to erect a monument, being obliged to create a monument on an outer wall, under the rules. Being also charged 3000 Scots pounds for this privilege, the monument is necessarily grand. The grave is a memorial only as, whilst Little is definitely in the graveyard, this is not the position.

He is now mainly remembered for this elaborate stone tomb in Greyfriars Kirkyard, which was completed in 1683 and is one of the most distinctive in the graveyard. The tomb shows Little lying recumbent, propped by his elbow, under a canopy supported on six Corinthian columns and topped by two female figures (representing Lady Justice and Prudence). Documents mention four figures on the tomb, representing moral virtues.

The railings and pillars on the church side are not part of the original design and were added in 1770 to provide enclusue, being designed by Thomas Sibbald.
