= Liberton Tower =

Tower house in Edinburgh, Scotland

- Edinburgh, Scotland
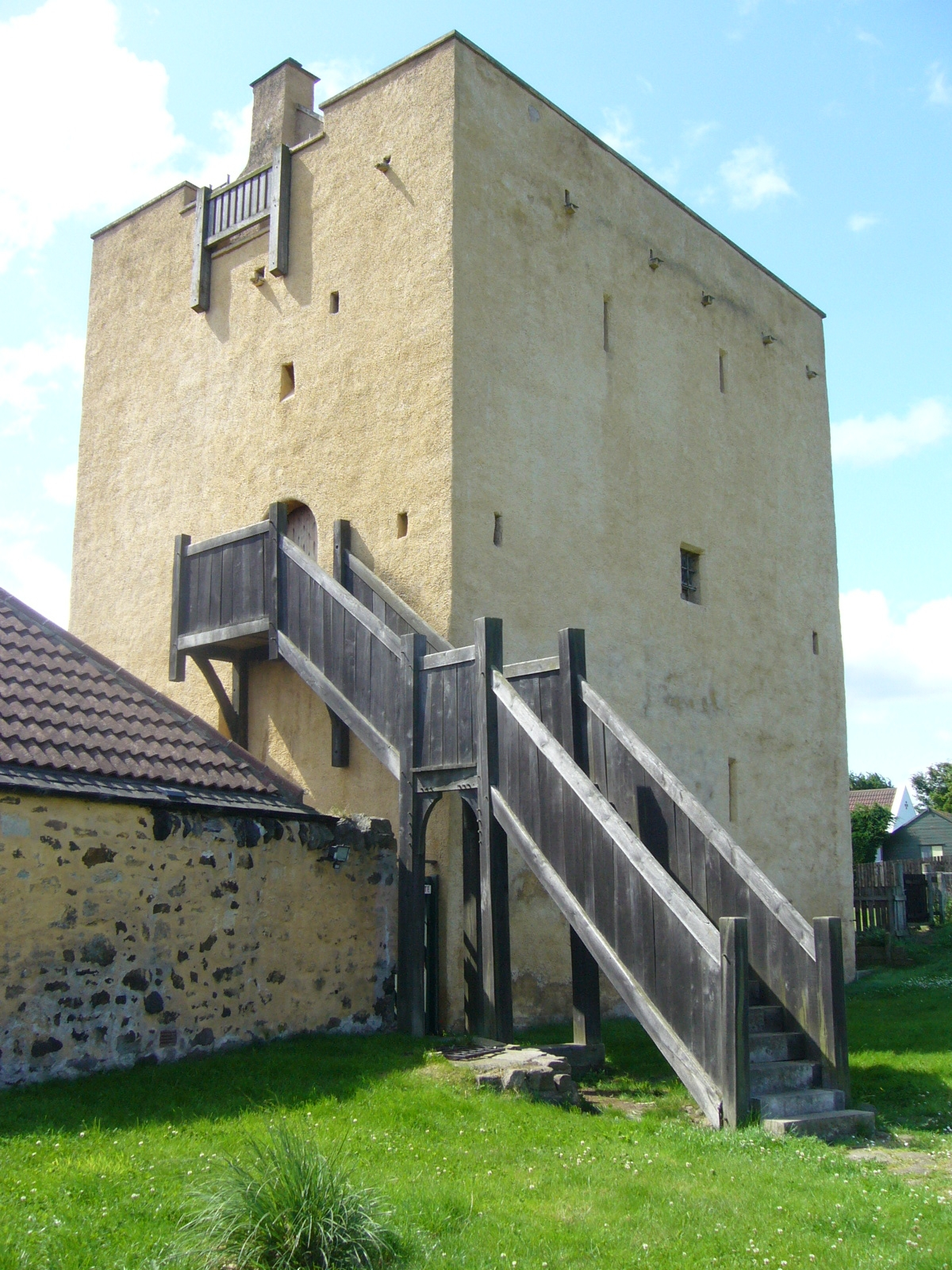
- Liberton Tower

Location
- Coordinates: 55.9145774°N 3.1773502°W

Site history
- Built: 15th century

Liberton Tower is a four-storey, square-plan tower house in the Edinburgh suburb of Liberton, on the east side of the Braid Hills.

== History ==
Located in Over or Upper Liberton, it was originally owned by the Dalmahoy family, whose arms appear on a carved panel on the south wall. Records of it being in their possession date back to 1453, but the provenance of the tower before that is not known.

It passed to a branch of the Forrester family of Corstorphine, before being sold to William Little, who was Provost of Edinburgh in 1586 and 1591. Provost Little built the nearby Liberton House, and the castle was abandoned in 1610, being subsequently used for agricultural storage.

Deposits of charcoal as well as smashed pottery suggest that the tower was caught up in the fighting around Edinburgh in 1650, when Cromwell invaded Edinburgh as part of the Anglo-Scottish War. Other evidence to this effect is the removal of the parapets, damage to the tower and the finding of cannonballs in nearby fields.

== Design ==
Liberton Tower provides a good example of a typical noble residence of its period, one of the relatively few that were not substantially altered in later centuries. Featureless except for its small, asymmetrically arranged windows, it is coated in distinctive yellow harling and has been described as "grim and ponderous". The tower is rectangular in plan, being 34 feet 9 inches (10.59 m) along the east–west axis and 25 feet 9 inches (7.85 m) along the north–south axis.

The 15th-century structure is well preserved and was restored in 1994. It is used for holiday lets.

== See also ==
- Restoration of castles in Scotland
