= Patrick Nisbet, Lord Eastbank =

Scottish landowner and judge

Patrick Nisbet, Lord Eastbank (1565–1648) was a long-lived 17th century Scottish landowner, judge and Senator of the College of Justice.

== Life ==
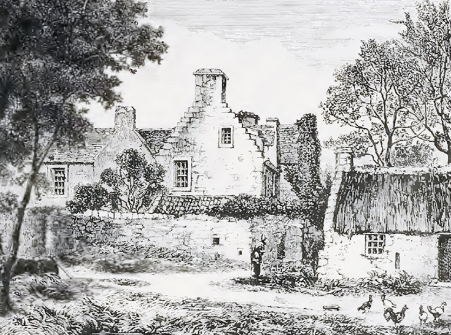
Dean House, Edinburgh

He was the son of Henry Nisbet of Dean, Lord Provost of Edinburgh in 1597, and his wife, Jonet Bannatyne. He was presumably therefore born in Dean House, just west of Edinburgh.

He trained as a lawyer and practiced as an advocate in Edinburgh. In 1613 he purchased a tenement on the Royal Mile in Edinburgh from his half brother, James Nisbet, a burgess in the city.

He owned at estate at Eastbank (location unknown) and also Dryden House near Pathhead in Midlothian.

In November 1636 he was elected a Senator of the College of Justice (Lord of Session) replacing Lord Newhall who had died.

He was knighted in 1638 by the Marquis of Hamilton. He was forced to resign as a Senator (with three others) in 1641 for crimes libelled against them.

He wrote a will in 1647 and is said to have died on 4 January 1648. There is no specific record of his burial place, but it is likely he is buried with his parents and grandparents in the crypt of St Cuthbert's Church, Edinburgh.

It is noted that in 1669 a Patrick Nisbet of Dean purchased a baronetcy in Nova Scotia.

His birthplace, Dean House, was demolished in 1842 to create Dean Cemetery.

== Family ==
He married Jean Arthur in June 1608. They had four children including John Nisbet, Lord Dirleton.

His older brother William Nisbet of Dean was Lord Provost of Edinburgh in 1616. His other brother was James Nisbet of Restalrig.
