= Robert Bruce of Kinnaird =

Moderator of the General Assembly of the Church of Scotland (1554–1631)

Robert Bruce
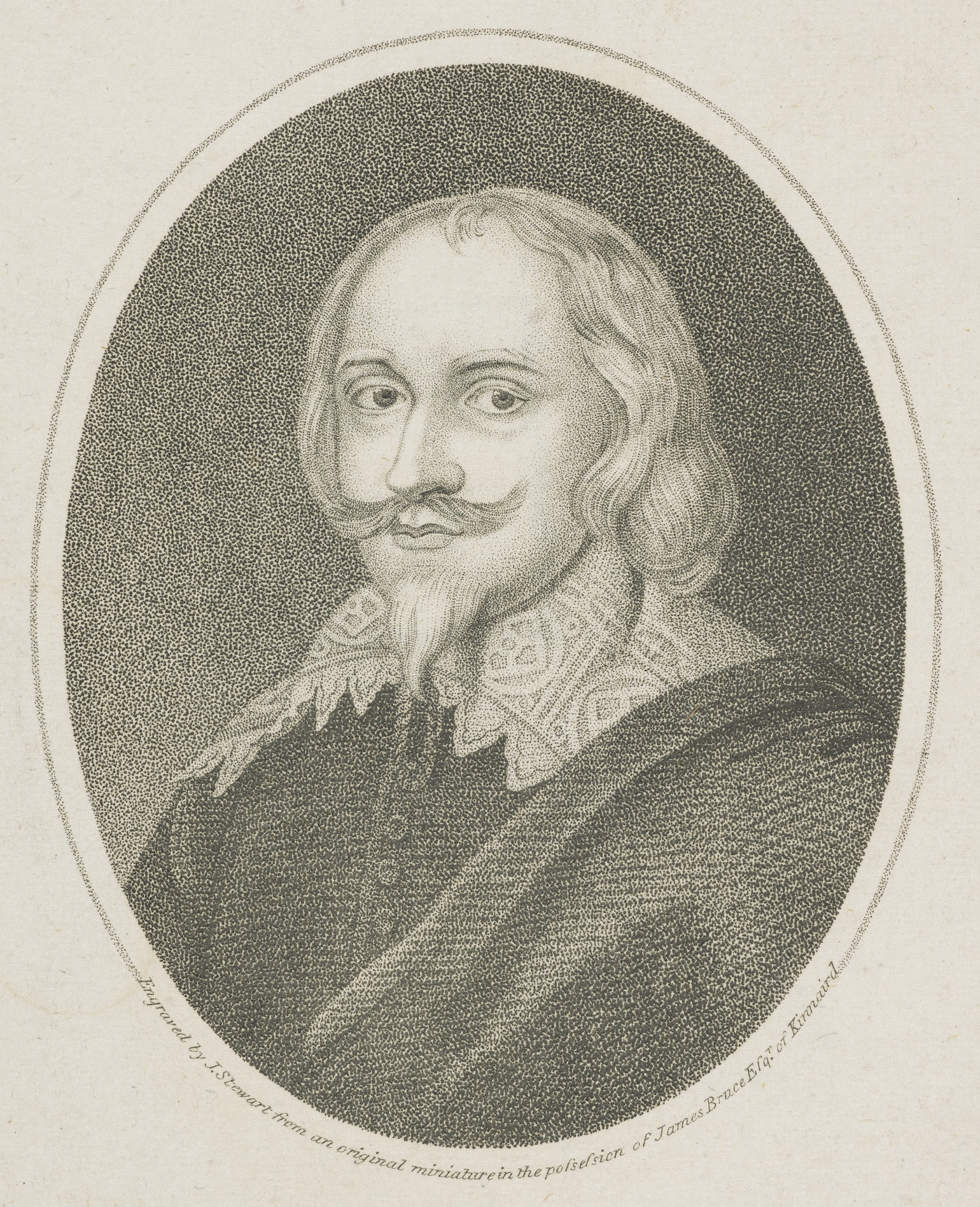
- Master Robert Bruce
- Church: St Giles, Edinburgh
- Predecessor: Robert Rollock
- Successor: John Hall

Personal details
- Born: 1554
- Died: 27 July 1631 (aged 76–77)
- Education: St. Andrews and Paris

Robert Bruce (1554 – 27 July 1631) was Moderator of the General Assembly of the Church of Scotland which was called on 6 February 1588 to prepare defences against a possible invasion by the Spanish Armada. King James VI was so sensible of the valuable services of the church in preserving public tranquillity, during his absence in Norway (part of Denmark at the time) on the occasion of his marriage, that in his letters to Bruce he declared that he was "worth the quarter of his kingdom." John Livingstone, the preacher at the Kirk of Shotts revival, said of Bruce "in my opinion never man spake with greater power since the apostles' dayes".

== Life ==
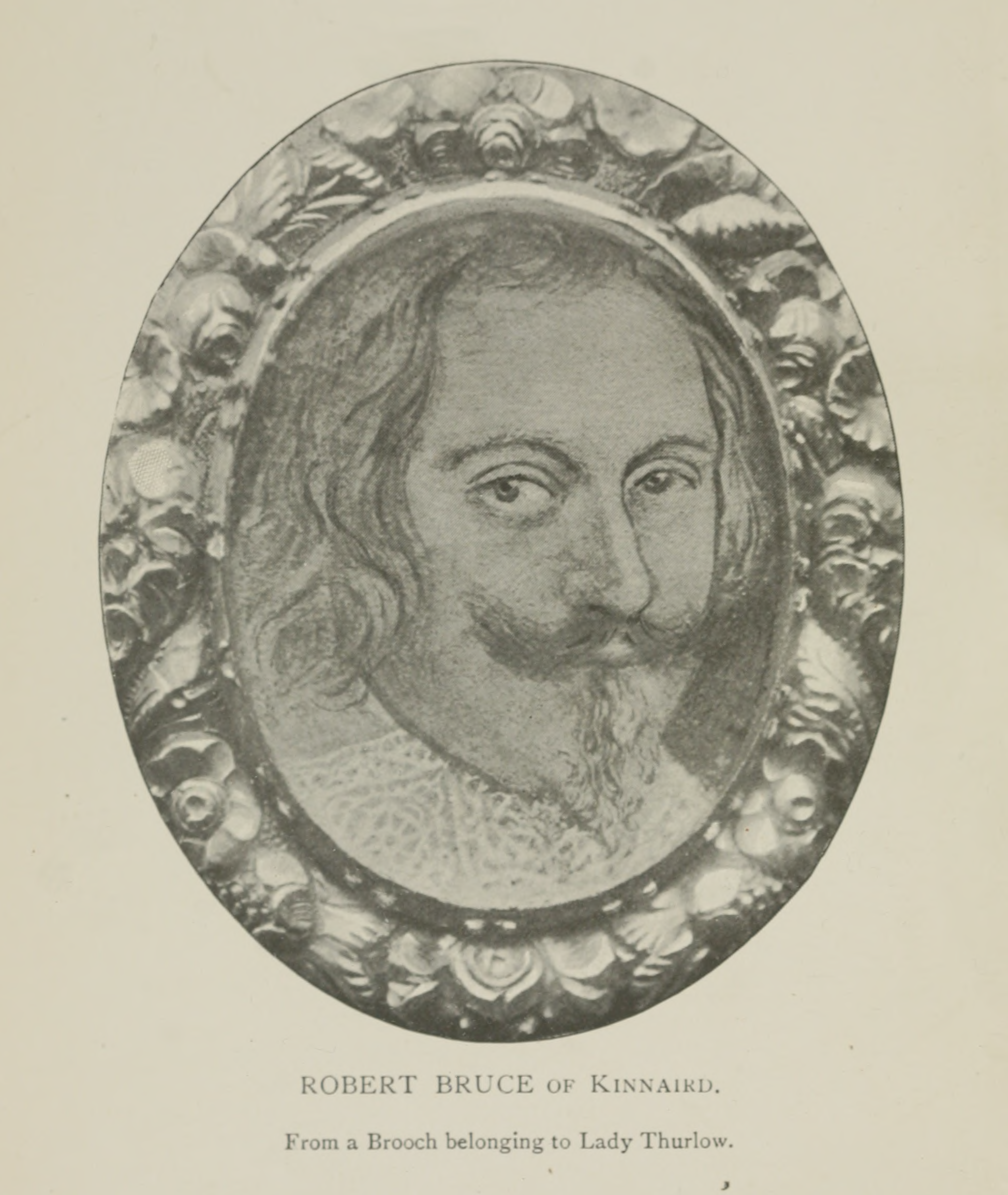
Robert Bruce of Kinnaird

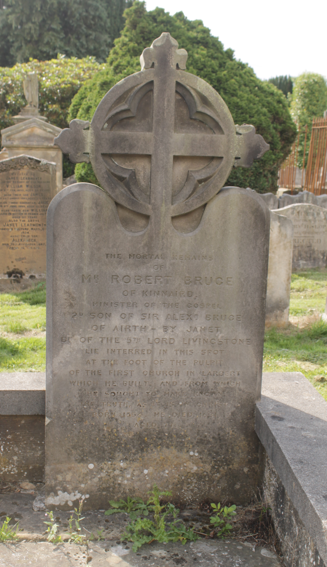
The grave of Robert Bruce of Kinnaird, Old Larbert Churchyard

He was born in 1554, the second son of Sir Alexander Bruce of Airth. His mother, Janet Livingstone, was the great, grand daughter of King James I of Scotland. In 1572, he graduated M.A. from St Andrews University, where he had been a student at St Leonard's College. He then went to Paris where he studied law, returning to Edinburgh to practice. However, during the night of 31 August 1581 he had a remarkable religious experience, which made him decide to study for the Church. He was licensed by the Presbytery of St Andrews in 1587 and immediately took up the post of Minister of St Giles' Cathedral, Edinburgh.

In October 1589, in very disturbed times, King James VI appointed him as Privy Councillor. He so helped keep the peace while the King was away in Norway (where he had gone to bring home bride Anne of Denmark) that he got a personal letter of thanks on his return. He crowned Anne of Denmark on 17 March 1590 and anointed her with oil, which was controversial.

On 26 October 1591, Bruce was appointed to a commission to try, examine, and if required torture people suspected of witchcraft. The others appointees were Sir John Cockburn of Ormiston, David MacGill of Nesbit, John Duncanson, William Litill, then Provost of Edinburgh, and Sir John Arnot.

He was again elected Moderator in May 1592. In September 1596, with the Edinburgh merchant Clement Cor and the physician Gilbert Moncreiff he interviewed a woman from Nokwalter in Perth, Christian Stewart, who was accused of causing the death of Patrick Ruthven by witchcraft. She confessed she had obtained a cloth from Isobel Stewart to bewitch Patrick Ruthven, and repeated this confession to the king and Sir George Home at Linlithgow Palace. She was found guilty of witchcraft and burnt on Edinburgh's Castlehill.

In 1596, he was banished from Edinburgh for opposing the King's religious policy. He was allowed to return after a time, and, in May 1598, was appointed Minister to the Little Kirk, a division of St Giles, though he quibbled a bit about the admission ceremony. In August 1600, the Gowrie Conspiracy took place. Bruce was one of those who doubted there was a real threat, so he did not offer prayers of thanksgiving for the King's safe delivery. For this, he was banished from Edinburgh and forbidden to preach publicly anywhere in Scotland under pain of death.

This did not seem to stop him. From 1605 onward, he was in Inverness, where he seemed to have continued preaching, at least to friends. He even acted as Minister at Forres’ In 1609, his son managed to persuade the King to let Bruce return to his own lands at Kinnaird, near Stirling. There, he paid for the repair of the Kirk at Larbert, where he also acted as Minister. Sometimes he preached in Stirling. He had property in Monkland near Glasgow where he also preached, apparently to great acclaim. "Wherever he had an opportunity of preaching, great crowds attended; he preached with remarkable power, and his own life being in full accord with his preaching, the influence lie attained was almost without parallel in the history of the Scottish Church."

Inevitably, he was, in 1620, again banished to Inverness, where he remained until 1624, growing increasing infirm. King James died in 1625. His son King Charles I allowed Bruce to return to Kinnaird, where he died 27 July 1631. Andrew Melville described him as a "hero adorned with every virtue, a constant confessor and almost martyr to the Lord Jesus”.

The person of Robert Bruce was tall and dignified. His countenance was majestic, and his appearance in the pulpit grave, and expressive of much authority. His manner of delivery was, in the words of a presbyterian historian, 'an earthquake to his hearers, and he rarely preached but to a weeping auditory.' It is told, as an instance of the effect of his sermons, that a poor Highlander one day came to him after he had concluded, and offered to him his whole wealth (two cows), on condition that he would make God his friend. Accustomed to continual prayer and intense meditation on religious subjects, his ardent imagination at times appears to have lost itself in visions of the divine favour; a specious, but natural illusion, by which the most virtuous minds have been deceived and supported, when reason and philosophy have been summoned in vain. His knowledge of the Scriptures was extensive, and accurate beyond the attainment of his age. His skill in the languages, and the sciences of those times, not to mention his acquaintance with the laws and constitution of the kingdom, a branch of knowledge possessed by few of his brethren, was equal, if not superior, to that of any of the Scottish reformers. His sermons, of which sixteen were printed in his lifetime, display a boldness of expression, regularity of style, and force of argument, seldom to be found in the Scottish writers of the sixteenth century. A translation of their rich idiomatic Scottish into the English tongue was printed in 1617, and is that which is now most common in Scotland.

This great man was buried within the church of Larbert, in which he had often preached during the latter part of his life. People assembled from all quarters to attend his funeral; and, according to Calderwood, between four and five thousand persons followed his corpse to the grave.

Due to rebuilding of the church the grave is now outside (and west of the current church). It was restored in the late 19th century.

== Marriage and children ==
Bruce married Martha Douglas, a daughter of George Douglas of Parkhead. She became a friend of Anne of Denmark. In June 1601 Robert Bruce wrote to her from Berwick asking if she could find out discretely if gifts sent to the queen from the wife of the English ambassador Robert Bowes had arrived.

Their children included:

- Robert Bruce, who married Margaret Menteith
- John Bruce
- Elizabeth Bruce, who married James Campbell of Moy
- Mary Bruce, who married Michael Elphinstone of Quarrel (1593-1640) son of Lord Elphinstone.

== Works ==
- Sermons upon the Sacrament of the Lord's Supper (Edinburgh, 1590; republished and edited by Prof. John Laidlaw, D.D., Edinburgh, 1901)
- Answer to foregoing by William Reinolde, priest at Antwerp, 1593;
- The Way to True Peace and Rest (London, 1617); [which, with another, and Life by Robert Wodrow, were edited by William Cunningham, D.D., and printed for the Wodrow Society, 1843].

== Bibliography ==
- Sermons;
- The Edin. (Bapt.),
- Counc, and Test. Reg. (Stirl.);
- Booke of the Kirk;
- Petrie's, Spottiswood's, Row's, and Calderwood's Hists.;
- Melvill's Autob.;
- Scots Mag., lxiv.;
- Orig. Lett.,
- Maitland's Hist, of Edinburgh,
- Dict. Nat. Biog.,
- W. Bruce Armstrong's Bruces of Airth
- M. E. Cumming Bruce's Family Records of the Bruces
- Macnicol's Master Robert Bruce (contains account of recently discovered MS. Sermons of Robert Bruce).]
- Row's, Spottiswood's, and Calderwood's Histories of the Church of Scotland;
- Autobiography and life of Robert Blair;
- Livingstone's Memorable Characteristics;
- Melville's Autobiography;
- Wodrow's Collections as to the Life of Mr. Robert Bruce;
- "Wodrow Society's Life and Sermons of Rev. Robert Bruce, edited by Principal Cunningham, D.D.;
- Scott's Fasti, i. 4, 17.
