= William Nisbet of Dean =

Scottish merchant

Sir William Nisbet of Dean (c. 1570 – c. 1630) was a 16th/17th century Scottish merchant who twice served as Provost of Edinburgh from 1616 to 1619 and 1622 to 1623.

== Life ==
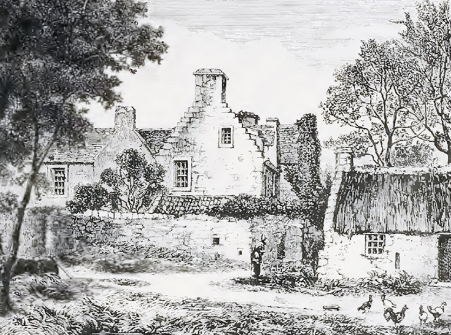
Dean House, Edinburgh

He was the son of Henry Nisbet of Dean, Provost of Edinburgh in 1597/98, and his wife Jonet Bannatyne or Bellenden (d. 1621). His father died in 1608 and William inherited Dean House in western Edinburgh, extending it greatly.

He was twice Provost of Edinburgh (he pre-dated the use of the term Lord Provost). In 1616 he succeeded Sir John Arnot. He served a second term 1622/23. During his first term of office, in 1617, he would certainly have met and hosted King James VI, in his role as leader of the capital city, on this the King's only return to Edinburgh after the Union of the Crowns.

As Dean House lay in the parish of St Cuthberts Church he is buried there with his father.

Dean House was demolished in 1842 and the grounds used to create Dean Cemetery. It had been downsized in the 18th century and was by then quite modest in scale. A window pediment commemorates his first marriage to Jonet Williamson, carved with "S. W. N. - D. I. W." with their heraldry. A pediment for the door of the house is inscribed; "S. W. N. - D. K. D", for Sir William Nesbit and his second wife, Dame Katherine Dick. Painted vignettes from the ceiling of the long gallery were salvaged by Charles Kirkpatrick Sharpe and are now in the National Museum of Scotland and John Knox House, the subjects include Cain and Abel, Lot and his daughters, Judith, and other subjects.

== Family ==
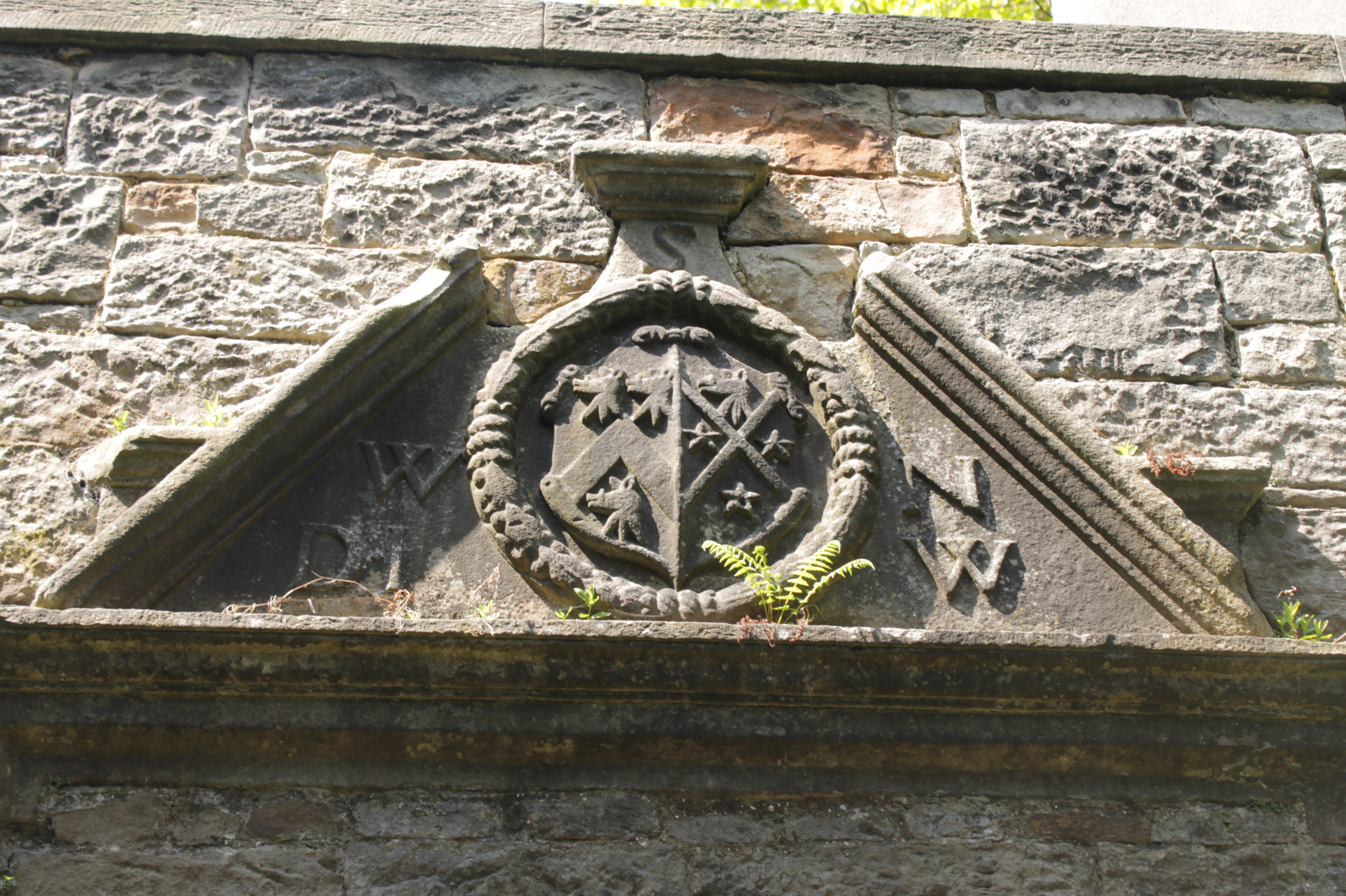
Marriage Lintel from Dean House - William Nisbet and Janet Williamson - Dean Cemetery

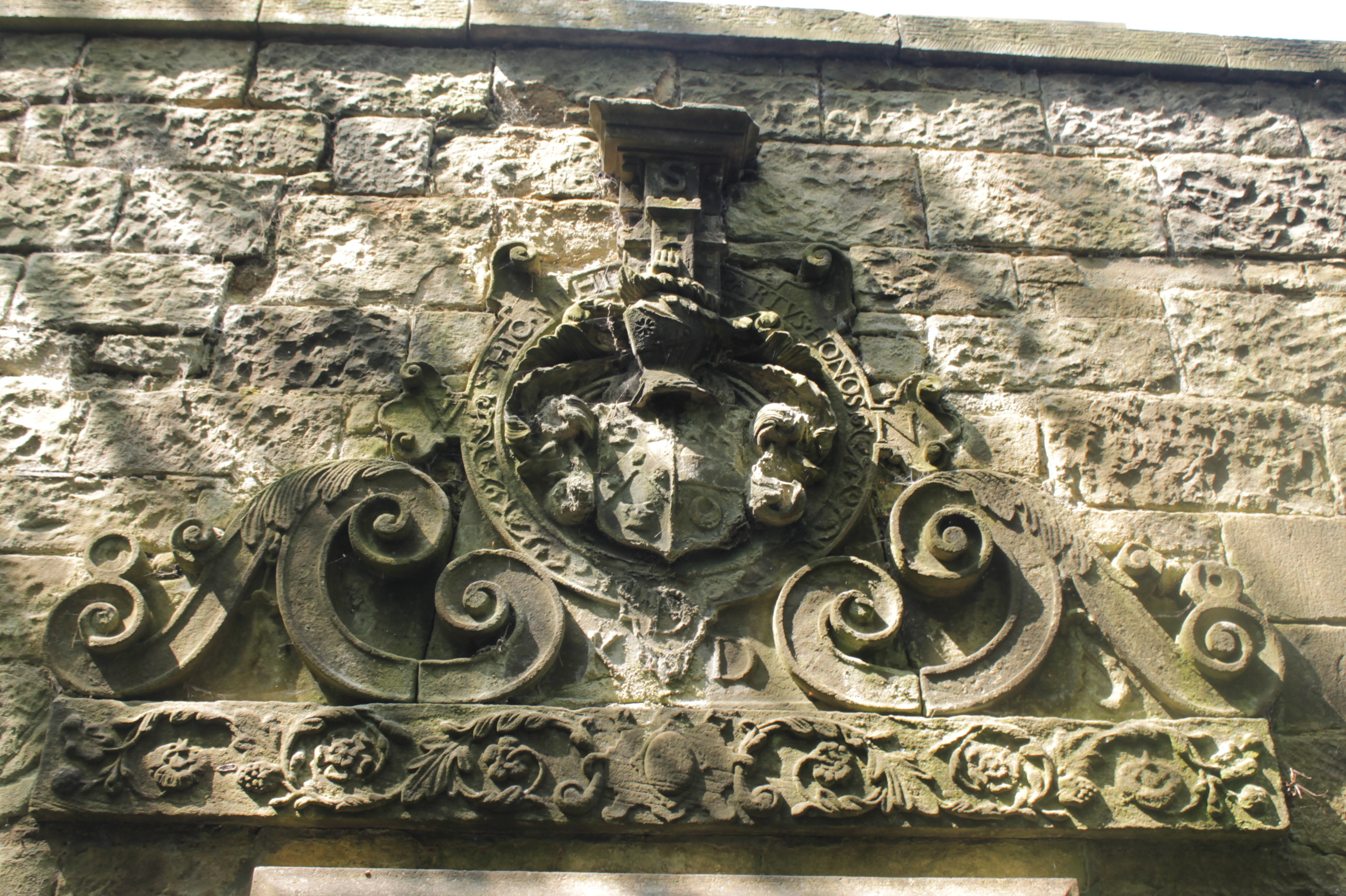
Marriage Lintel from Dean House - William Nisbet to Katherine Dick c.1625 - preserved in Dean Cemetery

William Nesbit married firstly Jonet Williamson (d. 1622) and secondly Katherine Dick (d. 1630) daughter of William Dick of Braid. He was older brother to Patrick Nisbet, Lord Eastbank (1583-1682) was created 1st Baronet of Dean (a baronet of Nova Scotia) in 1669.

His brother James Nisbet (1557-1621) married Marion Arnot, daughter of Sir John Arnot (also a Lord Provost of Edinburgh) and through this marriage inherited Lochend House near Restalrig, thereafter being known as James Nisbet of Restalrig.

The marriage lintels and other ornate stones from Dean House are preserved on the lower south terrace of Dean Cemetery.
