= Lawrence Fletcher =

Lawrence Fletcher (died 1608) was an English actor of the Jacobean era.

== Biography ==
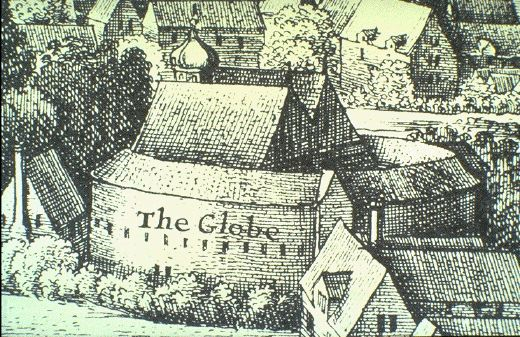
When the theatres were closed due to plague in May 1603, King James gave a patent to Lawrence Fletcher and other players

Fletcher was named first on the royal patent of 19 May 1603 that transformed the Lord Chamberlain's Men into the King's Men. William Shakespeare was second, and Richard Burbage third, and this order was significant, in the highly hierarchical world of the time. Yet Fletcher never appears on the other documents that give later generations limited knowledge of the King's Men; he doesn't seem to have acted, in the leading acting company of the age. Unlike the eight men whose names follow on the patent, Fletcher was not, or not primarily, a London actor. He had been "comedian to His Majesty" before the Union of Crowns in 1603, when James VI and I was King of Scotland only.

The names of actors on the patent were Fletcher's, then "William Shakespeare, Richard Burbage, Augustyne Philipps, John Henings, Henrie Condel, William Sly, Robert Armyn, Richard Cowly, and the rest of their associates". They are permitted "freely to use and exercise the Arte and Faculty of playing Comedies, Tragedies, Histories, Enterludes, Morals, Pastoralls, Stageplaies, and such others". The patent specified they would play the Globe Theatre, and elsewhere, whenever the plague subsided.

Fletcher's inclusion on the 1603 patent may have been diplomatic and bureaucratic, a way of easing and greasing the company's transition from the old regime to the new; or perhaps Fletcher intended to be an active member of the company (their comedian Thomas Pope died in 1603, and Fletcher could have been his replacement), but was prevented by declining health.

Augustine Phillips died in May 1605. He left 20 shillings to his "fellow" Fletcher. This is less than the 30 shillings he left to Shakespeare, Henry Condell, and Christopher Beeston, but the same sum he left to fellow King's Men Robert Armin, Alexander Cooke, Richard Cowley, and Nicholas Tooley. This seems to suggest that Fletcher was more than a mere name on a document to Phillips, though what more, precisely, is impossible to say, given the limits of the record.

Fletcher was buried on 12 September 1608, in St. Saviour's Church, Southwark.

== Lawrence Fletcher in Scotland ==
Fletcher was mentioned by an English diplomat in Edinburgh, George Nicholson in March 1595. James VI was evidently fond of Fletcher, and he joked about the actor who might have been "hanged for his cause."

Fletcher was in Edinburgh at the end of 1599, protected by James VI from sanction by the Kirk and town council. He was helped by the courtier George Elphinstone who bought timber for the stage, and distributed reward money from the king. They also played in Dundee and Aberdeen, where Fletcher, described as the king's servant, was made a freeman of the burgh.

He may have been the Englishman prevented from staging a play in St Andrews in October 1598.
