= Henry Nisbet =

Scottish merchant

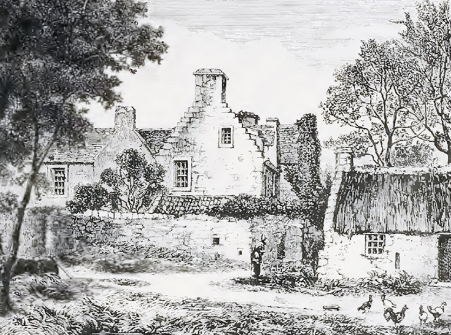
Dean House, Midlothian

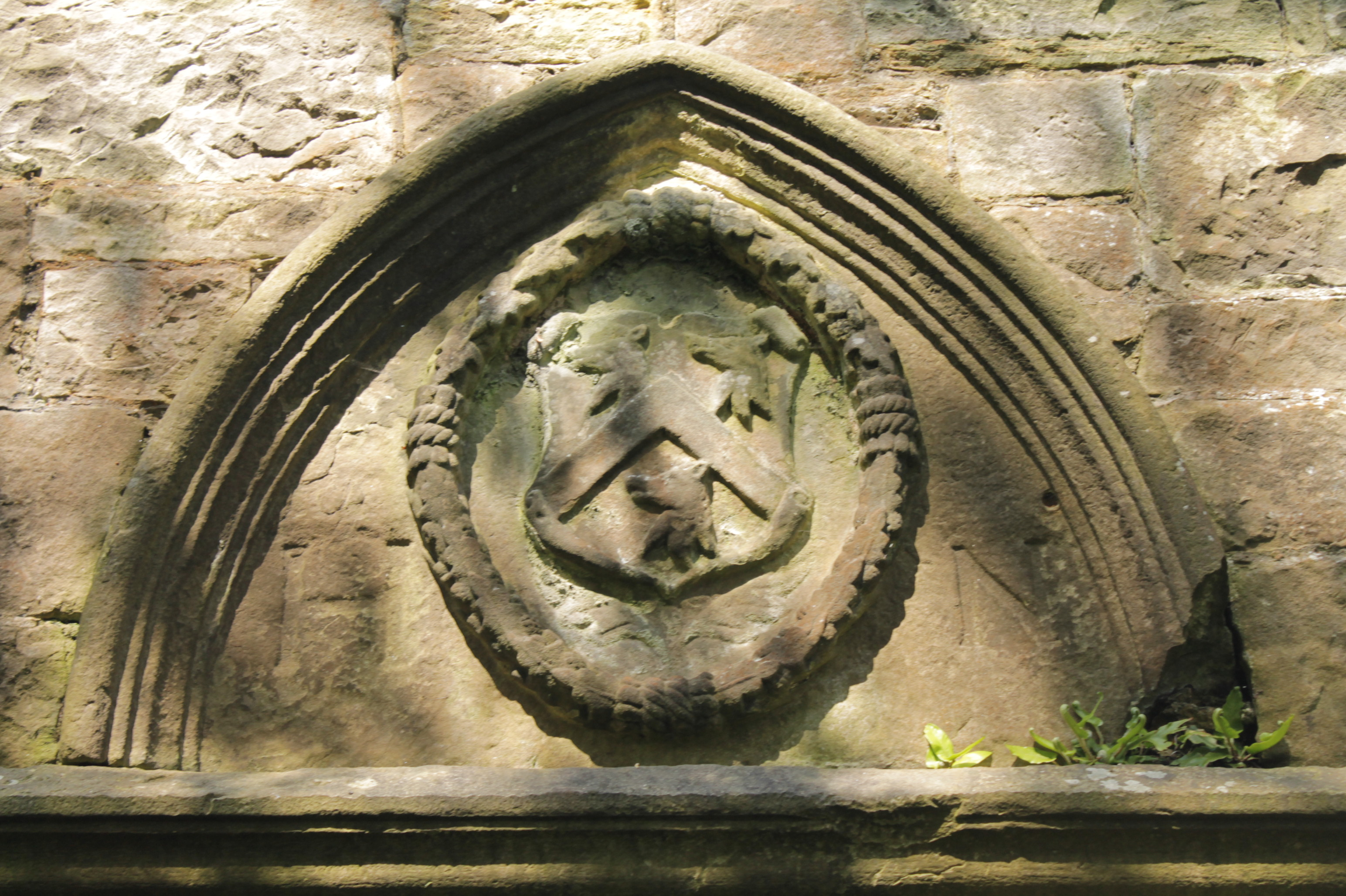
Lintel to Henry Nisbet from Dean House, inscribed H N and reused at Dean Cemetery

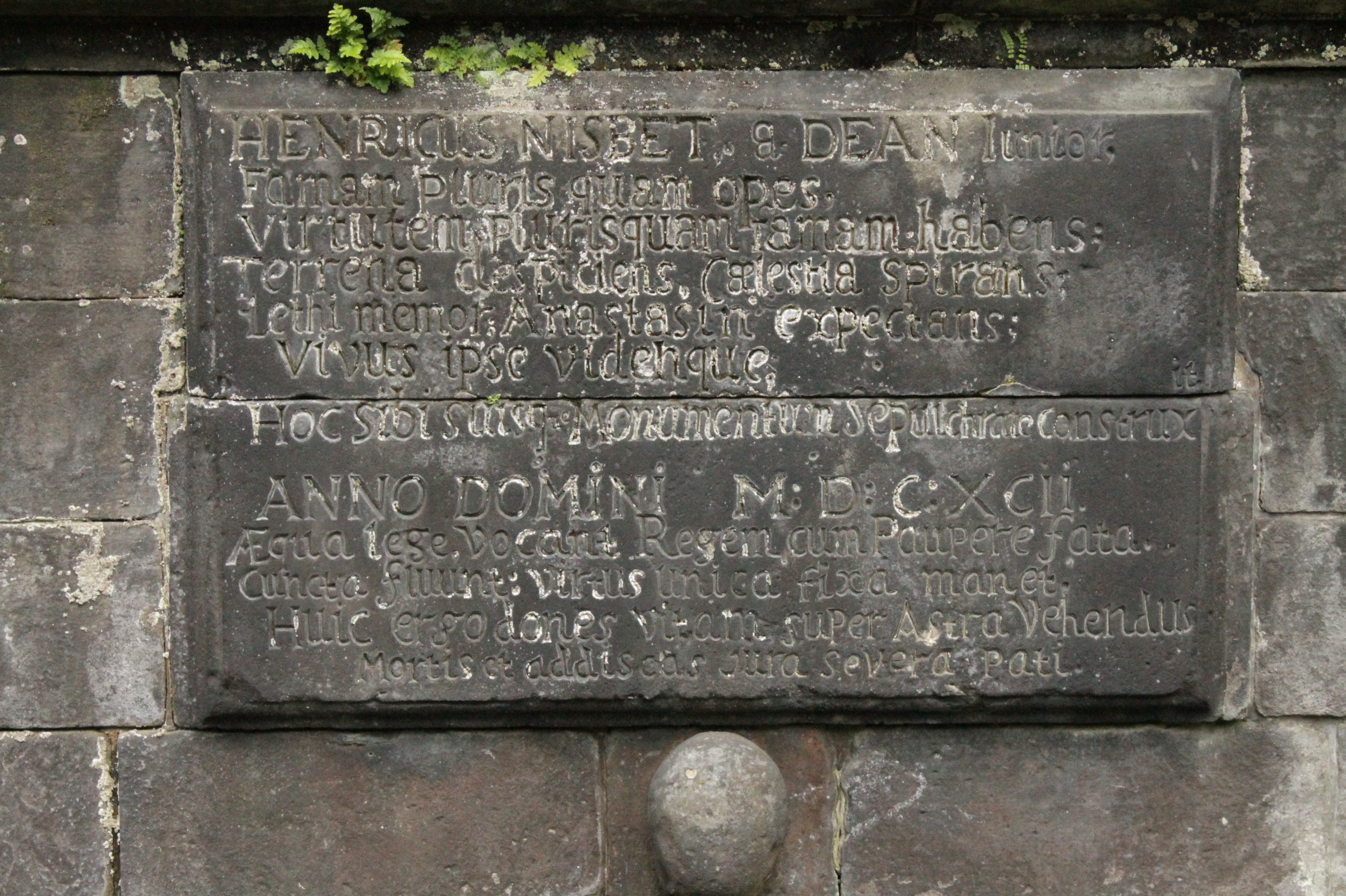
Tombstone of Henry Nisbet of Dean at the crypt entrance of St Cuthbert's Church, Edinburgh

Henry Nisbet (1535–1608) was a 16th-century Scottish merchant and Provost of Edinburgh for 1597/98.

== Life ==
The son of Adam Nisbet and Elizabeth Hay, daughter of the 3rd Lord Hay, he became a textile merchant, haberdasher and clothier in Edinburgh. In 1587 he supplied Ambassador Eustache de Courcelles with violet crimson velvet for his attendants' clothes, mourning cloth at death of Mary, Queen of Scots, a beaver hat, silk points and ribbon for the Ambassador's shoes, and other court dress. Nisbet also advanced the French ambassador large sums of money.

Acting as an envoy, Nisbet delivered royal letters to Charles IX of France in April 1583 requesting tax relief for Scottish merchants, and then HM letter in reply to Esmé Stewart, 1st Duke of Lennox.

Nisbet served as Provost of Edinburgh for 1597/98. In July 1598 Nisbet was a member of a committee of lawyers and ministers including Sir John Preston of Fentonbarns, the Revd Robert Rollock and John Russell who devised a syllabus for the University of Edinburgh comprising readings from Latin authors.

Resident in an Edinburgh townhouse on the High Street, in 1609 his son bought from the estate of Lord Lindsay the feudal barony of Dean just west of Edinburgh, where the Nisbets built a mansion which survived until the 19c, and is now where the Dean Cemetery is situated.

The National Museum of Scotland has painted ceiling fragments from the gallery of Dean House depicting the Sacrifice of Isaac, Judith, and other subjects. The paintings may date from the time of his son, Sir William Nisbet. A carved pediment for a window was inscribed; "H. N." for Henry Nisbet displaying the Nisbet arms, and a stone panel with "I. B." and the Bellenden arms for his wife, Janet Bellenden.

After Henry Nisbet died in 1608, his sons obtained permission from the Burgh to erect a monument in his memory.

== Family ==
Nisbet married Janet Bellenden (d. 1621), aunt of Lord Bellenden, leaving issue including:

- Sir William Nisbet (1569–1634), who married (1) Janet Williamson (d. 1622), and (2) Katherine Dick (d. 1630).
- Patrick Nisbet, Lord Eastbank (1565–1648)
- James Nisbet (1557–1621), a Bailie of Edinburgh, on 5 February 1613 was despatched with the Burgh's gift to the wedding of Princess Elizabeth and Frederick V of the Palatinate; Nisbet married Marion Arnot, daughter of Sir John Arnot of Burwick (twice Provost of Edinburgh) and through this marriage inherited Lochend House near Restalrig, becoming James Nisbet of Restalrig.
