= Clan Baillie =

Scottish clan

- Crest: A boar's head erased Proper.
- Motto: Quid clarius astris (What is brighter than the stars)
- Clan Baillie no longer has a chief, and is an armigerous clan
- Historic seat: Hoprig; Penston; Lamington
Clan branches
Baillie of Carphin
Baillie of Polkemmet
Baillie of Provan
Baillie of Jerviswood
Baillie of Dunrogal
Baillie of Dochfour
Baillie of Dunain
Allied clans
Clan Gordon

Clan Baillie is a lowland Scottish clan, that is recognized as such by the Lord Lyon King of Arms. However, as the clan does not currently have a chief recognized by the Court of the Lord Lyon, it is therefore considered an armigerous clan.

== History ==
=== Origins ===
The most likely origin of the name is baillie which is French for 'bailiff', also referred to as a steward.

According to Alexander Nisbet, by tradition the Baillies in Scotland were a branch of the House of Balliol and that the family changed its name because of the unpopularity of the Balliol kings after Robert the Bruce came to the throne. However, there is no evidence to support this tradition and the name Balliol remained widespread in Scotland after that time.

The first record of the name in Scotland is William de Bailli of Hoperig who was a jury member at an inquest concerning forfeited lands in Lothian between 1311-1312. William was knighted by David II of Scotland in 1357 and was granted a royal charter for the barony and lands of Lamington, South Lanarkshire in 1368. From William descend the branches of the clan: the Baillies of Carphin, Park, Jerviston, Dunrogal, Carnbroe, Castlecary, Provand and Dochfour.

=== 15th century and clan conflicts ===
In 1452, Alexander Baillie, who was a younger son of Baillie of Lamington, fought at the Battle of Brechin. After the battle he was rewarded by the Earl of Huntly with the lands of Dunain and Dochfour which are near Inverness. He also became the constable of Inverness Castle. The family were prominent in affairs around Inverness which was the Highland capital. They also formed many alliances by marrying into local families.

=== 16th century and clan conflicts ===
In 1512, Cuthbert Baillie of Carphin was Lord High Treasurer of Scotland for James IV of Scotland. In 1566, William Baillie, Lord Provand was called to the Bench from where he took his title as Lord and remained there until his death in 1595. William Baillie of Lamington married Janet, daughter of James Hamilton, 1st Earl of Arran. In 1542, he was Master of the Wardrobe to Queen Mary. He remained loyal to Mary's daughter, Mary, Queen of Scots, and fought for her at the Battle of Langside in 1568. After this his estates were forfeited.

=== 17th century and civil war ===
General William Baillie who was the grandson of the forfeited William Baillie, was soundly defeated by James Graham, 1st Marquess of Montrose at the Battle of Alford and the Battle of Kilsyth in 1645. He had two sons who both married daughters of the Lord Forrester and they eventually succeeded to their estates. Robert Baillie was a renowned Protestant minister and was a chaplain to the army of the Covenanters in 1639. Robert Baillie of Jerviswood was also a staunch protestant and a cadet of the Lamington family. He was planning to emigrate to South Carolina to escape the oppression of the government in 1683. He had been in league with the faction which was opposed to the succession of James VII of Scotland in England. Although he had no connection with the conspiracy to overthrow the government he was still arrested and charged with high treason. The High Court sentenced him to death on 24 December 1684 and he was hanged on the same day. His family fled to Holland and his estates were not restored until after James VII had been overthrown in 1688.

=== 18th and 19th centuries ===
Lady Grizel Baillie was a poet and songwriter who died in 1746. She was the wife of George Baillie who in turn was the son of Robert Baillie who had been executed in 1684. This branch of the family succeeded by marriage to become the Earls of Haddington. James Evan Baillie of Dochfour married the daughter of the great Victorian industrialist, Michael Bass, 1st Baron Burton. Burton died without a male heir and so the peerage passed to the Baillies of Dochfour, who still hold Dochfour Castle on the shores of Loch Ness.

== Castles ==
Castles which have belonged to the Clan Baillie have included:

- Dochfour Castle, five miles south-west of Inverness. The castle was replaced by a mansion after the Jacobite rising of 1745.
- Castle Cary Castle, two miles north and east of Cumbernauld, Lanarkshire. Some of the masonry used was from Roman times and the Antonine Wall is nearby. The castle passed from the Livingstones to the Baillies in the early 17th century and it was torched after General William Baillie was defeated at the battles of Alford and Kilsyth in 1645. It was re-built but burnt again during the Jacobite rising of 1715. It passed to the Dunbars in 1730 after being restored. There are said to be two ghosts in the castle: Lizzie Baillie, who died in remorse after finding out that the worry her marriage had caused her father had killed him, and the above mentioned General William Baillie.
- Jerviswood House, one mile north of Lanark, was bought by a branch of the Lamington Baillies in 1636. It is an L-plan tower house that has been altered and which was originally built in the 16th century. It was the seat of the above mentioned Robert Baillie who was hanged in 1684. The house has received a Scottish Civic Trust commendation and has been restored.
- Mellerstain House, five miles east of Earlston in the Scottish Borders, was designed by William Adam and his son, Robert Adam, and dates from 1725. It is owned by the Baillie-Hamiltons, Earls of Haddington.
- Provan Hall, near Coatbridge, was built by the Baillies and was the seat of William Baillie of Provand who was Lord President of the Court of Session. It later passed to the Hamiltons and then to other families. There is said to be the ghost of a white lady who was murdered in a first-floor bedroom.
- Castlehill Tower, near Peebles in the Borders, was a seat of the Baillies of Jerviswood in 1672 and later owned by the Douglases.
- Redcastle, near Muir of Ord, Inverness-shire was held by the Baillies of Dochfour in the 19th century who had the castle re-modeled in 1840.
- Torwood Castle, near Falkirk, was long held by the Forresters but passed to the Baillies of Castlecray.

== See also ==
- Baillie Baronets
- Grizel Baillie, Lady Murray
