= List of windmills in Scotland =

A list of windmills in Scotland.

== Locations ==
=== Aberdeenshire ===
| Location | Name of mill | Type | Maps | First mention or built | Last mention or demise | Photograph |
|---|---|---|---|---|---|---|
| Aberdeen | Windmill Hill Mill | | | 1661 | 1661 | |
| Ellon | Hilton Mill; NJ 942 342 | Tower | 1867 | 1787 | Converted to horse mill 1880. Afterwards steam powered until 1924. Worked by tractor until 1956. | |
| Fraserburgh | Fraserburgh Mill; NJ 994 669 | Tower | 1869 | | Disused by 1869 | |
| Inverallochy | Mains of Cairnbulg; NK 024 642 | | | | | |
| Invernettie | Glenugie Distillery; NK 125 442 | Tower | | 1822 | | |
| Longmanhill | Montbletton; NJ 721 611 | | | Late 18th or early 19th century | Late 18th or early 19th century | |
| Lonmay | Savoch Mill; Strathbeg Mill; NK 056 586 | Tower | 1870 | 1840 | | |
| Peterhead | Windmill Street | Tower | | 1794 | Demolished 1937 | |
| St Combs | Quarryhill; NK 053 626 | | | | | |

=== Angus ===
| Location | Name of mill | Type | Maps | First mention or built | Last mention or demise | Photograph |
|---|---|---|---|---|---|---|
| Arbroath | Millgate | | | 17th century | 1832 | |
| Forfar | Bankhead Mill; NO 453 513 | Tower | | Late 19th century | | |
| Forfar | | Tower | | 1644 | Demolished 1838 | |
| Kinnell | Bolshan Mill; NO 620 521 | Tower | | | | |
| Kirkden | Dumbarrow Mill; NO 549 471 | Tower | 1859 | 1859 | | |
| Montrose | | | | 1693 | 1693 | |
| Montrose | Rossie Mill | | | | Demolished 18th century | |
| Montrose | Rossie Mill | | | 18th century | 18th century | |
| Sorn | Sorn Mill; NS 548 264 | | | 1857 | | |

=== Ayrshire ===
| Location | Name of mill | Type | Maps | First mention or built | Last mention or demise | Photograph |
|---|---|---|---|---|---|---|
| Ballantrae | Ballantrae Windmill; NX 091 833 | Vaulted Tower | 1747; 1855 | 1696 | Ruin by 1799 | |
| Monkton | Monkton Mill; NS 362 281 | Vaulted Tower | 1773 | 1773 | converted to dovecot early 19th century | |
| Saltcoats | Saltcoats Windmill | | | | Possibly converted to a prison cell. Windmill Street still exists | |

=== Banffshire ===
| Location | Name of mill | Type | Maps | First mention or built | Last mention or demise | Photograph |
|---|---|---|---|---|---|---|
| Fordyce | Sandend Mill; Glasshaugh Mill; NJ 560 657 | Tower | 1866 | 1761 | Ruin by 1866. | |
| Gamrie | Montbletton Mill; NJ 721 611 | tower | | Late 18th or early 19th century | | |
| Gamrie | Northfield Mill; NJ 823 661 | Tower | | 1798 | | |

=== Berwickshire ===
| Location | Name of mill | Type | Maps | First mention or built | Last mention or demise | Photograph |
|---|---|---|---|---|---|---|
| Ayton | Gunsgreenhill Mill; NT 948 637 | Tower | | | | |
| Gordon | Rumbletonlaw Mill; NT 676 453 | Tower | | Early 19th century | | |
| Swinton | Swinton Mill; NT 833 474 | Tower | 1858 | Late 18th century | | |
| Swinton | Swintonmill; NT 814 459 | Tower | | 1813 | | |
| Stow | Mitchelston Mill; NT 462 481 | Tower | | Late 18th or early 19th century | | |

=== Caithness ===
| Location | Name of mill | Type | Maps | First mention or built | Last mention or demise | Photograph |
|---|---|---|---|---|---|---|
| Achscrabster | ND 083 636 | | | | | |
| Hopefield | ND 075 676 | | | | | |
| Langland | ND 078 675 | | | | | |
| Olrig | Castlehill Mill; ND 195 685 | Tower | 1873 | 1860s | | |

=== Clackmannanshire ===
| Location | Name of mill | Type | Maps | First mention or built | Last mention or demise | Photograph |
|---|---|---|---|---|---|---|
| Alloa | New Sauchie Mill; NS 897 950 | Tower | | | Converted to dovecot | |

=== Dumfriesshire ===
| Location | Name of mill | Type | Maps | First mention or built | Last mention or demise | Photograph |
|---|---|---|---|---|---|---|
| Annan | NY 194 672 | | 1828 | 1828 | Demolished mid-19th century | |
| Collin | | Post | | 1670 | 1700 | |
| Dumfries | Maxwelltown; NX 968 758 | tower | 1850 | 1798 | Converted to observatory 1834 | |
| Hoddam | Shortrigg Mill; NY 162 744 | Tower | | Late 18th or early 19th century | | |
| Kirkmahoe | Duncow Mill; NX 974 838 | Tower | 1828; 1855 | Late or early 17th century | Ruin by 1855 | |
| Mouswald | Mouswald Grange Mill; NY 053 734 | Tower | 1828; 1856 | Late 18th century | Working until c. 1925 | |
| Rigg | NY 288 668 | | 1828 | 1828 | Demolished mid-19th century | |
| Stoneykirk | NX 096 524 | Post | | 19th century | | |
| Whithorn | NX 444 398 | Tower | | Late 18th century | Working in 1825 | |

=== East Lothian ===
| Location | Name of mill | Type | Maps | First mention or built | Last mention or demise | Photograph |
|---|---|---|---|---|---|---|
| Athelstaneford | Athelstaneford Mains; NT 541 771 | | 1824 | 1824 | 1824 | |
| Dunbar | Bielside Mill; NT 654 738 | Tower | 1853 | Late 18th century | | |
| Dunbar | Oxwellmains Mill; NT 720 763 | Tower | 1853 | Late 18th century | Ruin by 1853 | |
| Dunbar | Oxwellmains; NT 703 763 | | 1824 | 1824 | 1824 | |
| Dunbar | Knockenhair Mill; NT 670 789 | Tower | 1853 | 17th century | Ruin by 1853 | |
| Dunbar | East Barns Mill; NT 717 763 | | 1824 | 1824 | Demolished mid-19th century | |
| Leith | | Tower | | 1686 | Converted to signal tower c.1805 | |
| North Berwick | Balgone Barns Mill; NT 553 828 | Tower | | Late 17th century | Converted to dovecot by 1799 | |
| Papple | NT 591 725 | | 1824 | 1824 | 1824 | |
| Penston | NT 445 725 | Tower | 1824 | 17th century | Demolished during World War II | |
| Phantassie | Phantassie Mill; NT 597 773 | Tower | 1824 | 1824 | 1824 | |
| West Peaston | | | 1824 | 1824 | 1824 | |

=== Fife ===
| Location | Name of mill | Type | Maps | First mention or built | Last mention or demise | Photograph |
|---|---|---|---|---|---|---|
| Anstruther | | | | | | |
| Crail | | | | | | |
| Collessie | Melville Mill; NO 303 127 | Tower | | Late 18th century | Converted to dovecot | |
| Dunfermline | Hill House Mill; NT 091 859 | Tower | | 17th century | Converted to dovecot | |
| Elie | (several mills) | Vertical axle mills | | 18th century | 18th century | |
| Inverkeithing | | | | Mid-18th century | Mid-18th century | |
| Inverkeithing | Prathouse Moor | | | 1819 | 1819 | |
| Kingsbarns | | | c. 1885 | c. 1885 | | |
| Kirkcaldy | Dysart Mill; NT 299 934 | Tower | 1854 | Late 17th or early 18th century | Ruin by 1854 | |
| Largo | | | | | | |
| St Monans | St Monans Mill; NO 534 019 | Tower | 1853 | Late 18th century | Ruin by 1853, now restored | |
| Torryburn | NT 028 856 | | | 19th century | 19th century | |

=== Forfarshire ===
| Location | Name of mill | Type | Maps | First mention or built | Last mention or demise | Photograph |
|---|---|---|---|---|---|---|
| Montrose | Montrose Lunatic Asylum | Vertical axis | | 1895 | Demolished 1925 | |

=== Invernessshire ===
| Location | Name of mill | Type | Maps | First mention or built | Last mention or demise | Photograph |
|---|---|---|---|---|---|---|
| Fort George | | Tower | | | Demolished 1910s | |
| Inverness | Longman Road Mill | Tower | | | | |
| South Kessock | NH 658 470 | Tower | | 1827 | Demolished 1943 | |

=== Kirkcudbrightshire ===
| Location | Name of mill | Type | Maps | First mention or built | Last mention or demise | Photograph |
|---|---|---|---|---|---|---|
| Kirkcudbright | Cannee Mill; NX 687 501 | Tower | | | | |

=== Kincardineshire ===
| Location | Name of mill | Type | Maps | First mention or built | Last mention or demise | Photograph |
|---|---|---|---|---|---|---|
| Marykirk | | Vertical axis | | 1887 | 1912 | |

=== Lanarkshire ===
| Location | Name of mill | Type | Maps | First mention or built | Last mention or demise | Photograph |
|---|---|---|---|---|---|---|
| Carluke | High Mill; NS 849 508 | Tower | 1816; 1859 | 1797 | | |
| Glasgow | Windmillcroft; NS 589 647 | | 1788 | 17th century | Demolished c. 1800 | |
| Hamilton | NS 718 557 | Tower | 1816 | Late 18th century | 1816 | |
| Motherwell | There was never a windmill in Motherwell. Confusion because of Windy Hill Road | | | 18th century? | | |
| Shettleston | | | | 1737 | Blown down 13 January 1740 | |

=== Midlothian ===
| Location | Name of mill | Type | Maps | First mention or built | Last mention or demise | Photograph |
|---|---|---|---|---|---|---|
| Cousland | | | | | | |
| Cranston | Edgehead Mill; NT 372 651 | | 1894 | 1894 | | |
| Edinburgh | Belford Mill; NT 233 737 | Tower | 1852 | 1759 | | |
| Edinburgh | George Square | | | 17th century | 17th century | |
| Leith | Leith Mill; NT 272 767 | | | Late 17th century | | |
| Leith | Mylne's Mill; NT 271 786 | Tower | | 1686 | Converted to signal tower early 19th century | |

=== Morayshire ===
| Location | Name of mill | Type | Maps | First mention or built | Last mention or demise | Photograph |
|---|---|---|---|---|---|---|
| Advie | North Callange; NO 122 420 | Tower | | Late 18th or early 19th century | | |
| Drainie | Gordonstoun Mill | Tower | | Mid-18th century | Converted to dovecot | |
| Loch Spynie | | | | c. 1720 | Mid-18th century | |

=== Orkney ===
| Location | Name of mill | Type | Maps | First mention or built | Last mention or demise | Photograph |
|---|---|---|---|---|---|---|
| Birsay | Vinbreck | Wind engine | | 1909 | 1909 | |
| North Ronaldsay | Peckhole Mill; HY 762 528 | Post | 1879 | 19th century | Ceased work 1908 | |
| North Ronaldsay | | Wind engine | | c. 1900 | c. 1900 | |
| Orphir | Chinegar | Wind engine | | 1910 | 1939 | |
| Papa Westray | Holland Farm Mill; HY 489 513 | Post | 1879 | 1879 | Demolished 1926 | |
| Papa Westray | Hookin Mill; HY 499 513 | Wind engine | | 1901 | 1901 | |
| Papa Westray | Gowrie mill HY 497 537 | Wind engine | | | | |
| Papa Westray | Maeback Mill; HY 495 524 | Wind engine | | | Demolished 1930 | |
| Papa Westray | North Via Mill; HY 498 532 | Wind engine | 1901 | 1901 | 1940s | |
| Papa Westray | Roadside Mill; HY 495 525 | Wind engine | | | | |
| Papa Westray | South Via Mill; HY 498 532 | Wind engine | | | Working until 1958 | |
| Papa Westray | The Links, Pierowall; HY 441 498 | Wind engine | | | | |
| Papa Westray | Dykeside | Wind engine | | | | |
| Sanday | Scar Mill, Burness; HY 673 449 | Post | | | | |
| South Ronaldsay | Kirkhouse Point Mill; ND 470 907 | Post | 1879 | 1879 | | |
| Westray | Helzie, Rapness; HY 507 406 | Post | 1901 | | | |
| Westray | Sanquhar, Rapness; HY 508 417 | Wind engine | | | Working until 1950 | |
| Westray | Swartaback, Rapness; HY 495 428 | Wind engine | 1901 | 1901 | | |
| Westray | Hillhouse, Skelwick; HY 488 444 | Wind engine | | | | |

=== Perthshire ===
| Location | Name of mill | Type | Maps | First mention or built | Last mention or demise | Photograph |
|---|---|---|---|---|---|---|
| Broughty Ferry | | Tower | | 1853 | Demolished late 19th century, had five sails | |
| Dunbarney | Dunbarney House Windmill; NO 107 184 | Tower | 1860 | Late 17th or early 18th century | | |
| Dundee | South Union Street | | | | | |
| Dundee | (west of town) | | | | | |
| Dundee | | | | | | |
| Dunkeld | NO 021 425 | Tower | | 1693 | 1693 | |

=== Renfrewshire ===
| Location | Name of mill | Type | Maps | First mention or built | Last mention or demise | Photograph |
|---|---|---|---|---|---|---|
| Greenock | George Square | | | 1768 | 1768 | |
| Paisley | | | | | | |

=== Rossshire ===
| Location | Name of mill | Type | Maps | First mention or built | Last mention or demise | Photograph |
|---|---|---|---|---|---|---|
| Easter Ross | Tarrell | Wind engine | | 19th century | 19th century | |
| Easter Ross | Arboll | Wind engine | | 19th century | 19th century | |

=== Roxburghshire ===
| Location | Name of mill | Type | Maps | First mention or built | Last mention or demise | Photograph |
|---|---|---|---|---|---|---|
| Eckford | Caverton Mill; NT 749 257 | Tower | 1859 | Late 18th century | | |

=== Stirlingshire ===
| Location | Name of mill | Type | Maps | First mention or built | Last mention or demise | Photograph |
|---|---|---|---|---|---|---|
| Airth | Dunmore Mill; NS 862 894 | Tower | 1860 | 18th century | Disused by 1860 | |
| Airth | | | | Early 18th century | Early 18th century | |
| Muiravonside | Myrehead Mill; NS 965 775 | Tower | | Late 18th century | | |

=== West Lothian ===
| Location | Name of mill | Type | Maps | First mention or built | Last mention or demise | Photograph |
|---|---|---|---|---|---|---|
| Bo'ness | Bridgeness Mill; NT 013 815 | Tower | | 1750 | Converted to observatory 19th century | |

=== Wigtownshire ===
| Location | Name of mill | Type | Maps | First mention or built | Last mention or demise | Photograph |
|---|---|---|---|---|---|---|
| Kirkinner | Barwhanny Mill; NX 411 493 | Tower | | Late 18th or early 19th century | | |
| Kirkmaiden | Logan Mill; NX 116 438 | Tower | 1826; 1847 | 1684 | Ruin by 1847 | |
| Stoneykirk | Stoneykirk Mill; NX 095 522 | Tower | 1847 | | Ruin by 1847 | |

=== Shetland ===
| Location | Name of mill | Type | Maps | First mention or built | Last mention or demise | Photograph |
|---|---|---|---|---|---|---|
| South Havra | | | | | | |

== Sources ==
Unless stated otherwise, the source for all entries is Douglas, G., Oglethorpe, M., and Hume, J. R. (1984). Scottish Windmills. University of Strathclyde: Scottish Industrial Archaeology Survey. or "SCOTTISH WINDMILLS - AN OUTLINE AND INVENTORY" (PDF). Scottish Antiquaries Society.

== Maps ==
- 1773 Armstrong
- 1788 John McArthur
- 1816 Forrest
- 1824 Fowler
- 1826 Johnson
- 1828 John Thomson
- All other dates are Ordnance Survey maps.

== Notes ==
Mills in bold are still standing, known building dates are indicated in bold. Text in italics denotes indicates that the information is not confirmed, but is likely to be the case stated.
