= Hoprig =

Hoprig in Scotland, may refer to:

- Hoprig, a location near Gladsmuir, East Lothian.
- Hoprig Mains, a location west of Hoprig, in East Lothian.
  - Hoprig Mains Landing Ground, a World War I landing ground.
- Hoprig, a location near Cockburnspath, Scottish Borders.
- Hoprigshiels, a location adjacent to Hoprig, in Scottish Borders.
