= Kinmonth =

Kinmonth is a surname. Notable people with the surname include:

- Ack Kinmonth, Australian film and television composer
- Margy Kinmonth, British film and television director
- Patrick Kinmonth (born 1957), Anglo-Irish opera director and artist

== See also ==
- Kinmonth House', a listed building, in Scotland
