= John Hamilton (Ontario politician) =

Canadian politician

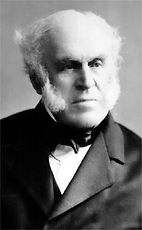
John Hamilton

John Hamilton (1802 – 10 October 1882) was a businessman, a political figure in Upper Canada and member of the Senate of Canada.

He was born in Queenston in 1802, the son of Robert Hamilton. He was educated in Queenston and Edinburgh, Scotland and first worked as a clerk in Montreal, Quebec. In 1824, with his stepbrother Robert, he established the Queenston Steamboat Company which operated a number of ships transporting goods on Lake Ontario. In 1831, he was appointed to the Legislative Council of Upper Canada for Queenston and, in 1841, he was re-appointed to its successor, the Legislative Council of the Province of Canada for Canada West. In the 1840s, due to increasing competition, he moved to Kingston, where he operated a business moving goods between Kingston and Montreal. In 1857, after his former competitors had gone bankrupt, he began operating on Lake Ontario again. In 1847, he became president of the Commercial Bank of the Midland District. Although his relationship with the bank was useful to his shipping business, his lack of attention to the bank's business may have contributed to its failure.

He was a co-founder of Queen's College at Kingston, later Queen's University, and became chairman of the board of trustees in 1842.

A Conservative, he was appointed to the Senate of Canada on 23 October 1867 by royal proclamation following the Canadian Confederation of 1867. He served in that capacity, representing the province of Ontario and Kingston until his death. He died at Kingston in 1882.
