= William Baillie of Lamington =

William Baillie of Lamington (died 1568) was a Scottish landowner and courtier, a Master of the Wardrobe, and with his namesake son, a supporter of Mary, Queen of Scots.

== Career ==
He was a son of William Baillie of Lamington and Elizabeth Lindsay. His sister Janet Baillie (died 1592) married David Hamilton of Preston, a courtier who went to France with James V of Scotland.

Baillie was appointed Master of the Wardrobe to Mary of Guise, the queen consort on 24 January 1542, and in January 1543 replaced John Tennent as keeper of the palace and park of Holyroodhouse. Baillie and John Kirkcaldy received the Honours of Scotland from Tennent.

In 1557 he appointed his relation, William Baillie of Provan, as minister of Lamington. He attended the Scottish Reformation Parliament in 1560.

A carved stone from his castle of Lamington Tower includes initials, as "VB", and the nine stars of the Baillie coat of arms. The stone was re-set at the church.

== William Baillie, younger, and Janet Hamilton, Lady Lamington ==
Baillie married Janet Hamilton, a half-sister of Regent Arran. Her father was James Hamilton, 1st Earl of Arran and his mother was a relation of Lord Boyd. Their heir was William Baillie.

After the death of William Baillie, Janet Hamilton married Alexander Baillie in 1570. During the Marian Civil War, on 22 April 1571, Alexander Baillie and Arthur Hamilton of Merrynton were in Edinburgh. They captured the king's tailor James Inglis near St Cuthbert's Church in Edinburgh. Inglis was returning from Stirling Castle, where he had been fitting the king's clothes. Inglis was imprisoned in Edinburgh Castle. The tailor was released two days later after the Deacon of Crafts had spoken with William Kirkcaldy of Grange, Captain of the Castle.

The younger William Baillie of Lamington went to Hamilton to the meeting of Mary's supporters when she escaped from Lochleven Castle in 1568. After their defeat at the battle of Langside, Mary rode south and is said to have stayed briefly at Lamington Tower.

William Baillie married Margaret Maxwell, a daughter of Lord Maxwell and widow of Archibald Douglas, 6th Earl of Angus. He also had a family with a daughter of Alexander Home of North Berwick, Provost of Edinburgh. Their children included the soldier William Baillie.

William Baillie's daughter Margaret married Edward Maxwell, Commendator of Dundrennan Abbey in 1577 and their family took the Baillie surname.
