= Ballantrae Windmill =

Windmill in South Ayrshire, Scotland

Ballantrae Mill, Ballantrae
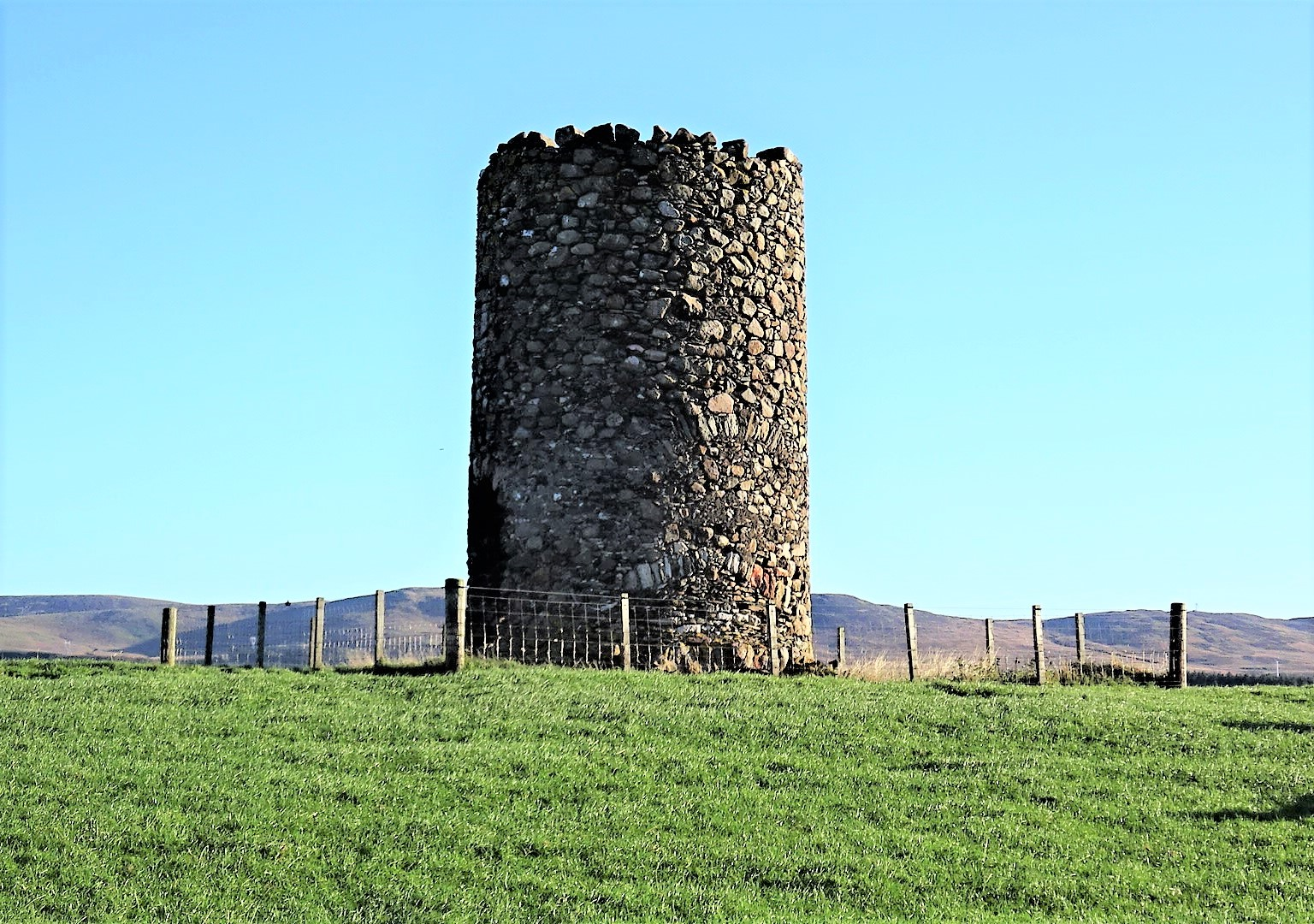
- The Ballantrae Windmill

Origin
- Mill name: Ballantrae Vaulted Tower Mill
- Mill location: Ballantrae, South Ayrshire
- Grid reference: NX090832
- Coordinates: 55.1065°N 4.9953°W
- Operator(s): Disused
- Year built: Late 17th or early 18th Century

Information
- Purpose: Meal mill
- Type: Vaulted Tower Mill
- Storeys: Two
- No. of sails: Four
- No. of pairs of millstones: 1

The Ballantrae Windmill, on Mill Hill was a late 17th or early 18th century vaulted tower windmill, the ruins of which are located above the old raised beach cliffs on the outskirts of the village of Ballantrae in South Ayrshire, Scotland. Built around 1696 it was disused by 1799 and is a Category A Listed Building due to its important place in early industrial development.

== Infrastructure ==
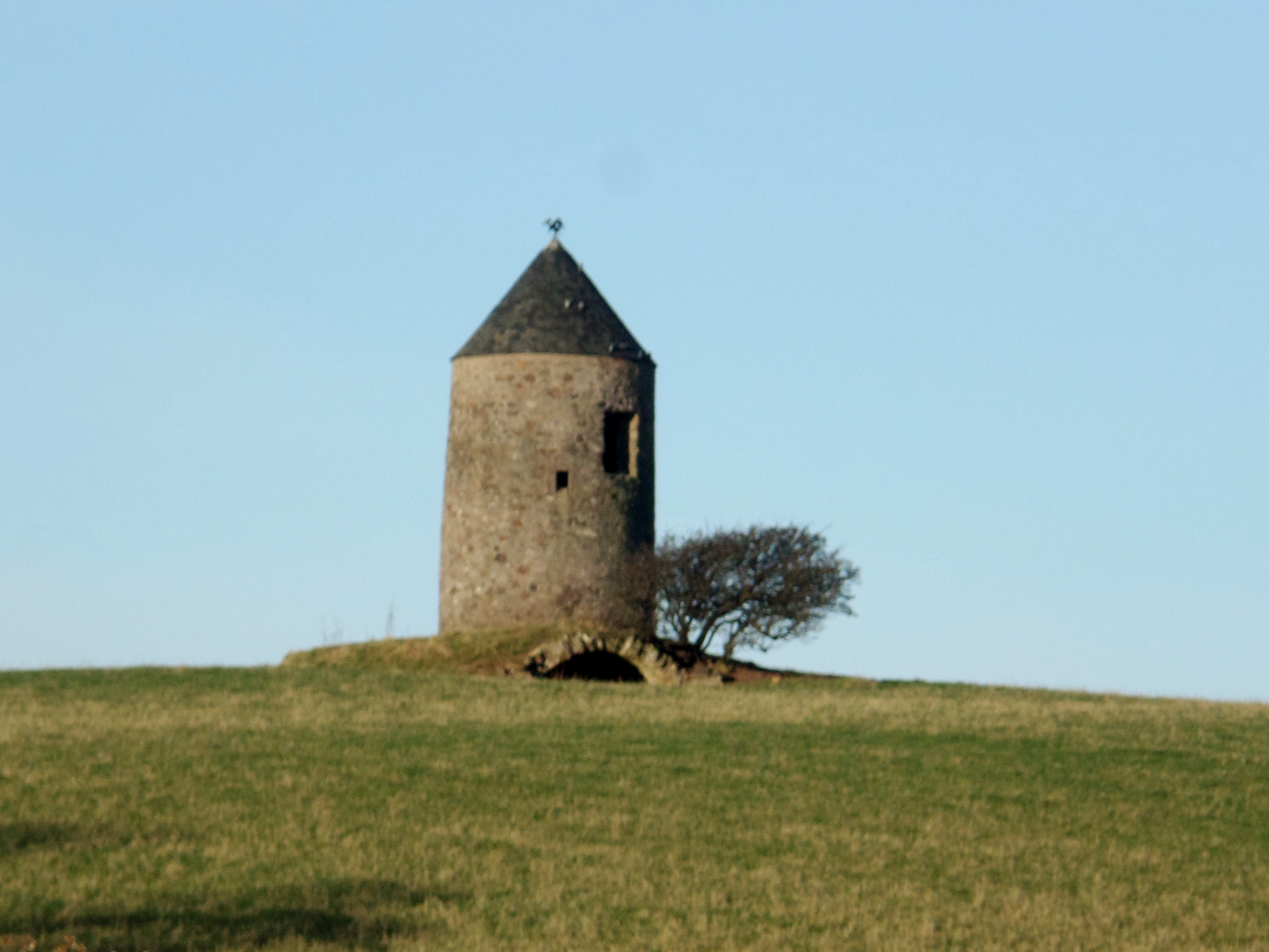
The Monkton Vaulted Tower Windmill

The circa 24 ft or 7m high shell of this early 17th or 18th century vaulted tower windmill has rubble walls 3 ft or 0.9m thick at the base rising from a low stone foundation platform. Unlike the Monkton Windmill it does not now appear to taper towards the top, a feature often used so that the tower did not become top heavy or distorted The original wooden windcap and sails are absent. The remains are described as a stump and the tower may be reduced in height. It has the remnants of a vaulted basement and had two storeys, the first floor being indicated by a slight recess encircling the tower above the north and south facing doorways. An unusual pair of relieving arches are present built into the tower wall above the west facing vault arch to strengthen and secure the structure.

A pair of north and south opposed doorways survive, set at ground level and there are two small windows above them on the first floor. The mill was built using local rubble from sources such as field clearance as indicated by plough marks, the nearby whinstone quarry and sea worn boulders from the beach. Most of the exterior waterproofing, probably stucco, has been lost and many of the stones are now loose. Ainslie's map of 1821 shows an enclosure surrounding the mill.

The access was by a sunken track leading into the vault from the west, the cliff side, however the route of the connecting lane or track is not clear although routes via Church Street or up through the slope of the old raised beach sea cliffs would be usable by horse and cart. A small burn once ran near by, now covered over and piped.

== History ==
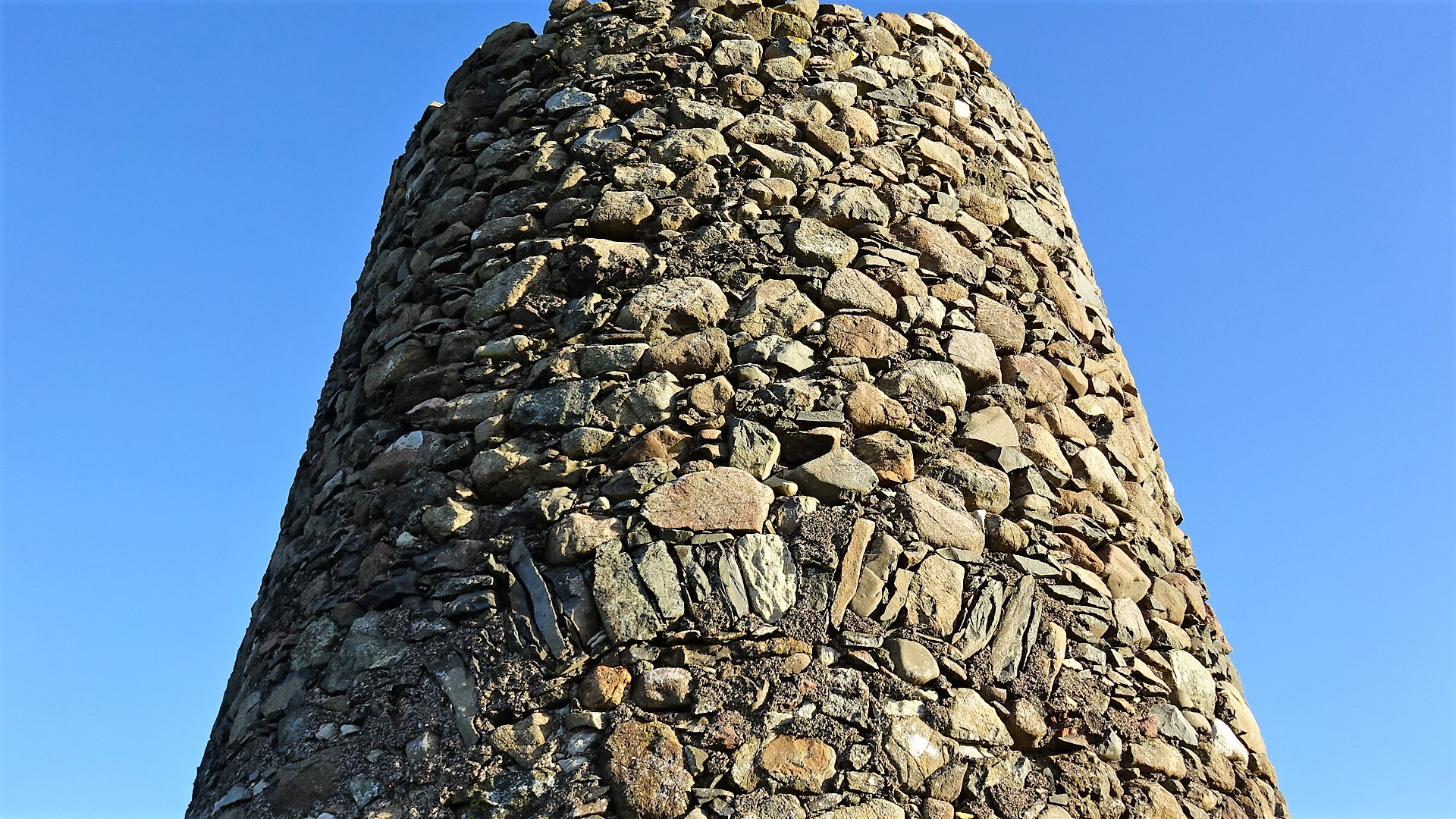
Detail of a relieving arch.

Thought to have been built in 1696 Ballantrae's tower remnant was originally a vaulted tower mill, a mill type that is rare in the UK outside Scotland The first map record of the Ballantrae Mill is 1747.

Windmills were often built in areas of low rainfall or where the land was flat and the water current sluggish however in this coastal location the advantage was the expectation of strong winds at all times of the year.

It is recorded on Roy's map of 1747 and the 1775 Armstrong map clearly shows a windmill at Ballantrae with four sails however by 1799 it is recorded as being ruinous.

== Workings details ==
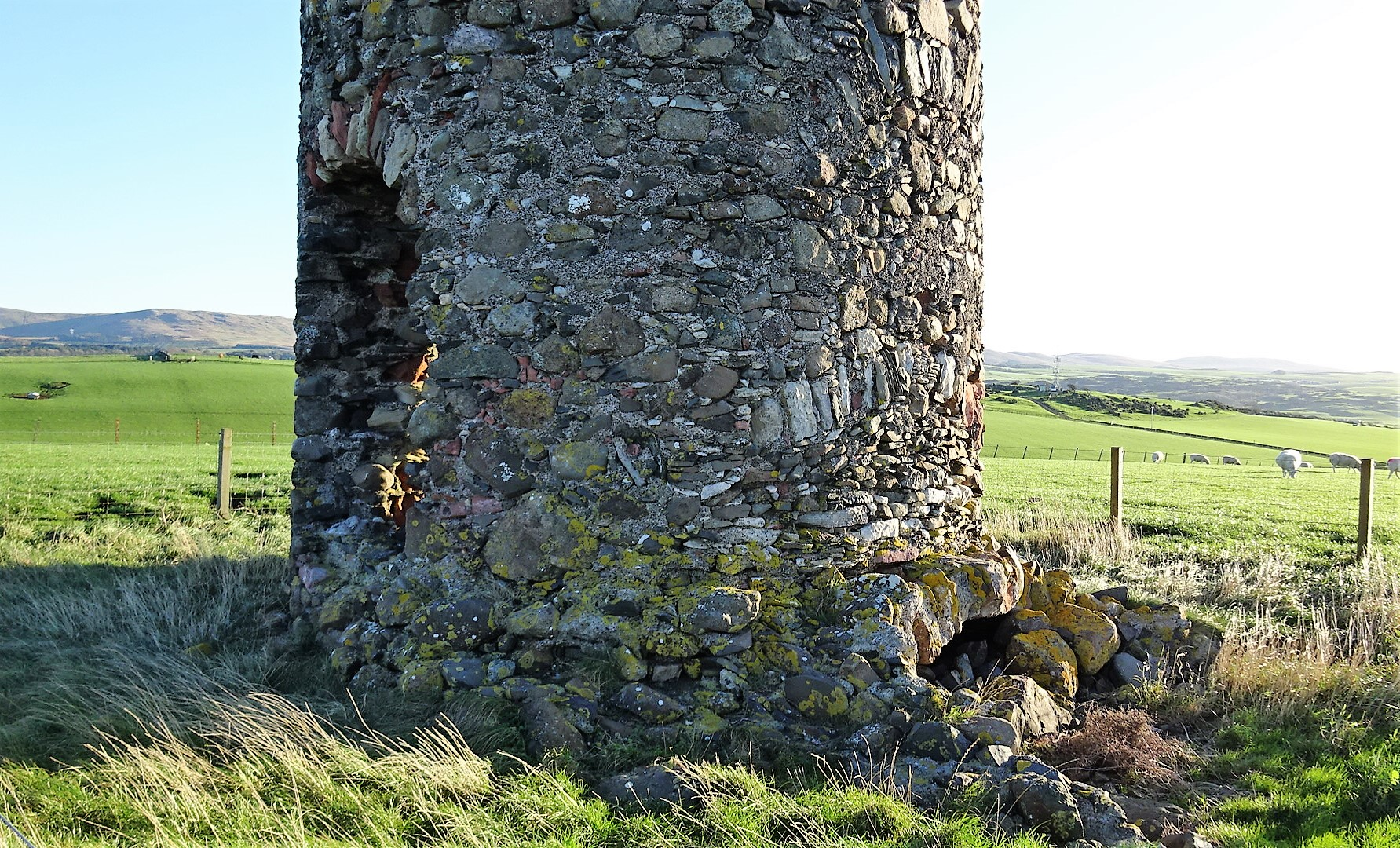
The buried vault.

This type of windmill is described as "...a fixed tower surmounted by a movable cap which supported the sails. The windcap was turned into the wind by hand using a fixed pole. The structure, built of local materials, often stone rubble, stood on an artificial mound over a stone-built vaulted chamber or cellar. The latter often extended outwards from the base of the mill and provided a third floor, which acted as a receiving and dispatching room."

As the windcap in this form of windmill was moved by hand to face the wind using a pole it required constant attention and the sails could also be tightened or trimmed to suit the wind speed.

Scottish windmills, as with watermills, were basically meal-mills, mainly producing wheaten and oaten meals as well as ground barley and bruised corn.

== The site today ==
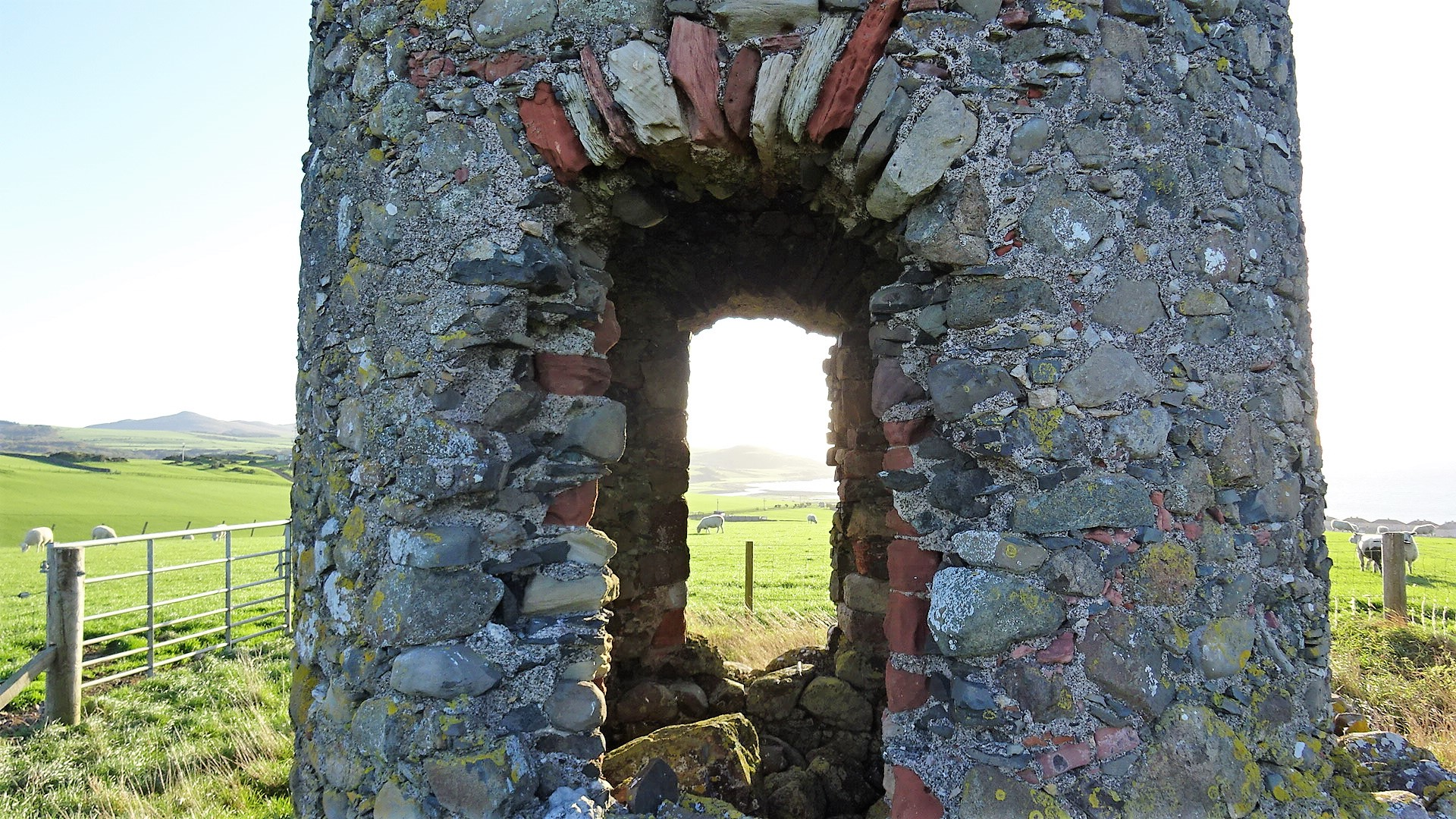
The opposed doorways.

The north and south facing doors are open and unaltered. The vault is in poor condition having been partly demolished and also blocked up to prevent the entry of cattle or sheep. The tower interior is substantially infilled with stones, some of which are from field clearance. Two small windows remain. No remnants of the windmill machinery survive. The mill does not obviously stands on a stone platform. As stated the exterior stucco waterproofing and mortar has been lost and the mill is on the buildings at risk register. The tower is around 6 ft or 2m lower than that at Monkton and a drawing from 1930 suggests that it was higher at that time in addition to it tapering towards the top.

Only twelve vaulted tower windmills survive and these collectively form the oldest group of industrial buildings in Scotland. Ballantrae has not seen any adaptations for alternative use and is therefore one of the best examples of the type.

== Micro-history ==
A number of old windmills that were no longer required were converted to other uses such as barns, stores, ice-houses, look-out towers and dovecotes although this did not happen in the case of Ballantrae's windmill. Monkton is a typical example of a vaulted tower mill, as are those at Sauchie, Dunbarney and Gordonstoun.

== See also ==
- Monkton Windmill, Ayrshire
