= Robert Hamilton (judge) =

Upper Canada businessman, judge and politician

Robert Hamilton (14 September 1753 – 8 March 1809) was a businessman, judge and political figure in Upper Canada.

== Life ==
He was born in the manse at Bolton, East Lothian, Scotland, in 1753, the son of Rev John Hamilton, the local minister, and his wife Jean Wight. His younger brother George Hamilton served as Moderator of the General Assembly of the Church of Scotland in 1805.

He moved to Canada as part of a contract with a fur trading company operating west of the Great Lakes. In 1780, he formed a partnership with Richard Cartwright to supply goods to the British army at Fort Niagara which later expanded to include the transportation of goods across the province. Around 1784, he settled at Queenston. In 1791, with others, he won the contract for transporting military goods through the portage road at Niagara to compete with the Niagara Portage recently ceded to the United States. In 1788, he was named to the land board of the Nassau District and a judge of the Court of Common Pleas. He opened a general store at Queenston and also acquired extensive land holding on the Niagara Peninsula with his profits.

In 1792, he became a member of the Legislative Council for the province.

He was married twice: first to Catherine Robertson, the daughter of John Askin and Monette a Native American enslaved woman, with whom he had five sons, and secondly to Mary Herkimer, with whom he had three sons and a daughter. He died at Queenston in 1809.

His sons, Alexander (First Sheriff of Niagara, Postmaster of Upper Canada, Deputy Collector of Customs), Robert, George and John, went on to become important political figures in the province.
