= List of listed buildings in Dunbarney, Perth and Kinross =

This is a list of listed buildings in the parish of Dunbarney in Perth and Kinross, Scotland.

== List ==
Name	Location	Date listed	Grid ref. (Note: Sometimes known as OSGB36, the grid reference (where provided) is based on the British national grid reference system used by the Ordnance Survey. • "Guide to National Grid". Ordnance Survey. • "Get-a-map". Ordnance Survey.)	Geo-coordinates	Notes	LB number (Note: Historic Environment Scotland assign a unique alphanumeric identifier to each designated site in Scotland, for listed buildings this always begins with "LB", for example "LB12345".)	Image
Horsemill Farmhouse				56°21′41″N 3°25′14″W	Category B	4504	Upload Photo
Kinmonth House				56°21′37″N 3°21′34″W	Category B	4507	Upload Photo
Carmichael Cottages				56°20′43″N 3°26′35″W	Category C(S)	4521	Upload Photo
Kilgraston House Lodge				56°20′28″N 3°24′37″W	Category B	4529	Upload Photo
Moncreiffe Estate, The Stables				56°21′33″N 3°24′02″W	Category B	4536	Upload Photo
Drummonie House				56°20′16″N 3°25′47″W	Category A	163	Upload Photo
Moncreiffe Estate, Former Dairy				56°21′35″N 3°23′53″W	Category C(S)	51439	Upload Photo
Moncreiffe Estate, Dovecote				56°21′35″N 3°24′12″W	Category B	4502	Upload Photo
Kinmonth Doo'Cot				56°21′35″N 3°21′25″W	Category B	4506	Upload Photo
Kilgraston House				56°20′30″N 3°24′59″W	Category A	4527	Upload another image See more images
Kilgraston Walled Garden				56°20′19″N 3°25′20″W	Category C(S)	4531	Upload Photo
Balendrick House				56°20′32″N 3°25′40″W	Category B	4532	Upload Photo
Bridge Of Earn, Back Street, Burnbrae, Burnside And Fetteresk				56°20′58″N 3°24′19″W	Category C(S)	4542	Upload Photo
Moncreiffe Estate, West Lodge Including Gate And Quadrant Walls				56°21′30″N 3°24′51″W	Category C(S)	51443	Upload Photo
Bridge Of Earn Former Earnbank Hotel				56°20′58″N 3°24′11″W	Category C(S)	4515	Upload Photo
Dunbarney Old Churchyard, Near Dunbarney House				56°21′18″N 3°26′11″W	Category B	4516	Upload Photo
Pitkeathly, Wellhouse Cottages				56°20′31″N 3°26′00″W	Category B	4523	Upload Photo
Parish Church Of Dunbarney				56°21′02″N 3°24′33″W	Category C(S)	4537	Upload Photo
Cyprus Inn Bridge Of Earn				56°20′58″N 3°24′20″W	Category C(S)	4541	Upload Photo
Gilloch Hall Bridge Of Earn				56°20′57″N 3°24′18″W	Category C(S)	4509	Upload Photo
House And Surgery (Dr Paul Mackenzie) Viewfield, Inverine Main Street				56°20′55″N 3°24′22″W	Category C(S)	4513	Upload Photo
Kilgraston House Former Stable Block				56°20′29″N 3°25′07″W	Category B	4530	Upload Photo
Pitkeathly Wells Farmhouse				56°20′33″N 3°26′04″W	Category C(S)	4524	Upload Photo
Kilgraston House Gates				56°20′28″N 3°24′37″W	Category B	4528	Upload Photo
Moncreiffe Estate, East Gate				56°21′12″N 3°24′20″W	Category C(S)	51437	Upload Photo
Moncreiffe Estate, Garden Cottage, East And West				56°21′31″N 3°23′25″W	Category C(S)	51441	Upload Photo
Moncreiffe Estate, Walled Garden And Ha-Ha				56°21′32″N 3°23′39″W	Category C(S)	51442	Upload Photo
Masonic Hall (Former Free Church Hall And Beadle's House) Bridge Of Earn				56°20′55″N 3°24′16″W	Category C(S)	4510	Upload Photo
Haughfield House Kintillo				56°20′37″N 3°24′35″W	Category C(S)	4514	Upload Photo
Dunbarney House Windmill				56°20′58″N 3°26′45″W	Category B	4520	Upload another image See more images
Balendrick House Stables				56°20′31″N 3°25′37″W	Category C(S)	4533	Upload Photo
Moncreiffe Estate, Moncreiffe House Including Walls, Ancillary Buildings And Gatepiers				56°21′31″N 3°23′55″W	Category B	4535	Upload another image See more images
Dunbarney Churchyard				56°21′02″N 3°24′35″W	Category C(S)	4539	Upload Photo
Manse Of Dunbarney				56°21′05″N 3°24′33″W	Category C(S)	4540	Upload Photo
Moncreiffe Estate, Gamekeeper's Cottage And Kennels				56°21′33″N 3°24′39″W	Category C(S)	51440	Upload Photo
Dunbarney House, Including Offices, And Garden Walls				56°21′09″N 3°26′25″W	Category B	4517	Upload Photo
Dunbarney House Sundial				56°21′08″N 3°26′24″W	Category B	4518	Upload Photo
Dunbarney House Doocot				56°21′05″N 3°26′30″W	Category B	4519	Upload Photo
Wallacetown Farmhouse				56°21′19″N 3°22′12″W	Category B	4505	Upload Photo
Former Free Church (I Imrie, Antiques) Bridge Of Earn				56°20′55″N 3°24′16″W	Category C(S)	4511	Upload Photo
'sealsbridge House' Bridge Of Earn				56°20′54″N 3°24′13″W	Category C(S)	4512	Upload Photo
Viewfield				56°20′45″N 3°25′56″W	Category C(S)	4522	Upload Photo
Pitkeathly Wells Steading				56°20′34″N 3°26′05″W	Category C(S)	4525	Upload Photo
Glenearn House Gatepiers				56°20′06″N 3°26′00″W	Category B	4526	Upload Photo
Parish Church Of Dunbarney, Session Room				56°21′01″N 3°24′33″W	Category C(S)	4538	Upload Photo
Moncreiffe Estate, Filter Bed And Water Tank				56°21′37″N 3°23′56″W	Category C(S)	51438	Upload Photo

== Key ==
The scheme for classifying buildings in Scotland is:

- Category A: "buildings of national or international importance, either architectural or historic; or fine, little-altered examples of some particular period, style or building type."
- Category B: "buildings of regional or more than local importance; or major examples of some particular period, style or building type, which may have been altered."
- Category C: "buildings of local importance; lesser examples of any period, style, or building type, as originally constructed or moderately altered; and simple traditional buildings which group well with other listed buildings."

In March 2016 there were 47,288 listed buildings in Scotland. Of these, 8% were Category A, and 50% were Category B, with the remaining 42% being Category C.
