= Penston =

Coordinates: 55.9398°N 2.8904°W

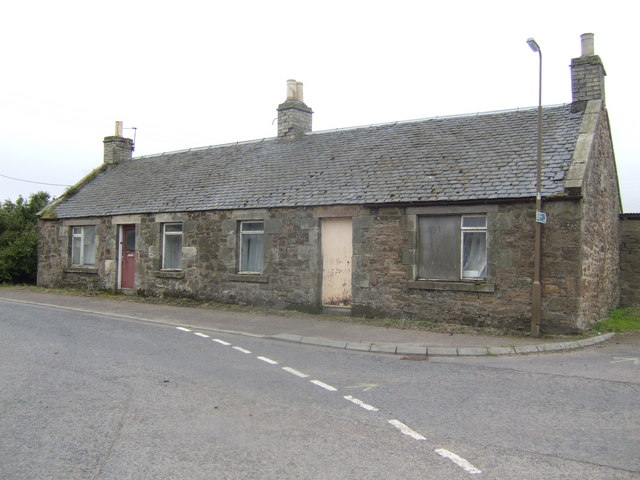

- Location within East Lothian
- Civil parish: Gladsmuir
- Council area: East Lothian
- Country: Scotland
- Sovereign state: United Kingdom
- Police: Scotland
- Fire: Scottish
- Ambulance: Scottish

Penston, is a small hamlet and feudal barony in the parish of Gladsmuir, East Lothian, Scotland.

The area around the village was productive in coal mining, but is now agricultural land.

The feudal barony of Penston was held by the Baillies of Hoprig, Penston and Lamington from the 14th century. The caput of the barony was located at Penston Castle, located a short distance to the south east. The castle is shown on Ordnance Survey maps in the 18th century as being ruinous.
