= Andrew Hamilton of Goslington =

16th-century Scottish landowner

Andrew Hamilton of Goslington, Newton, and Silvertonhill (died 1592) was a Scottish landowner.

== Background ==
He was the eldest of son of Alexander Hamilton (died 1547) and Catherine Hamilton, a daughter of John Hamilton of Newtoun. Newtoun or Newton lies just south of Strathaven.

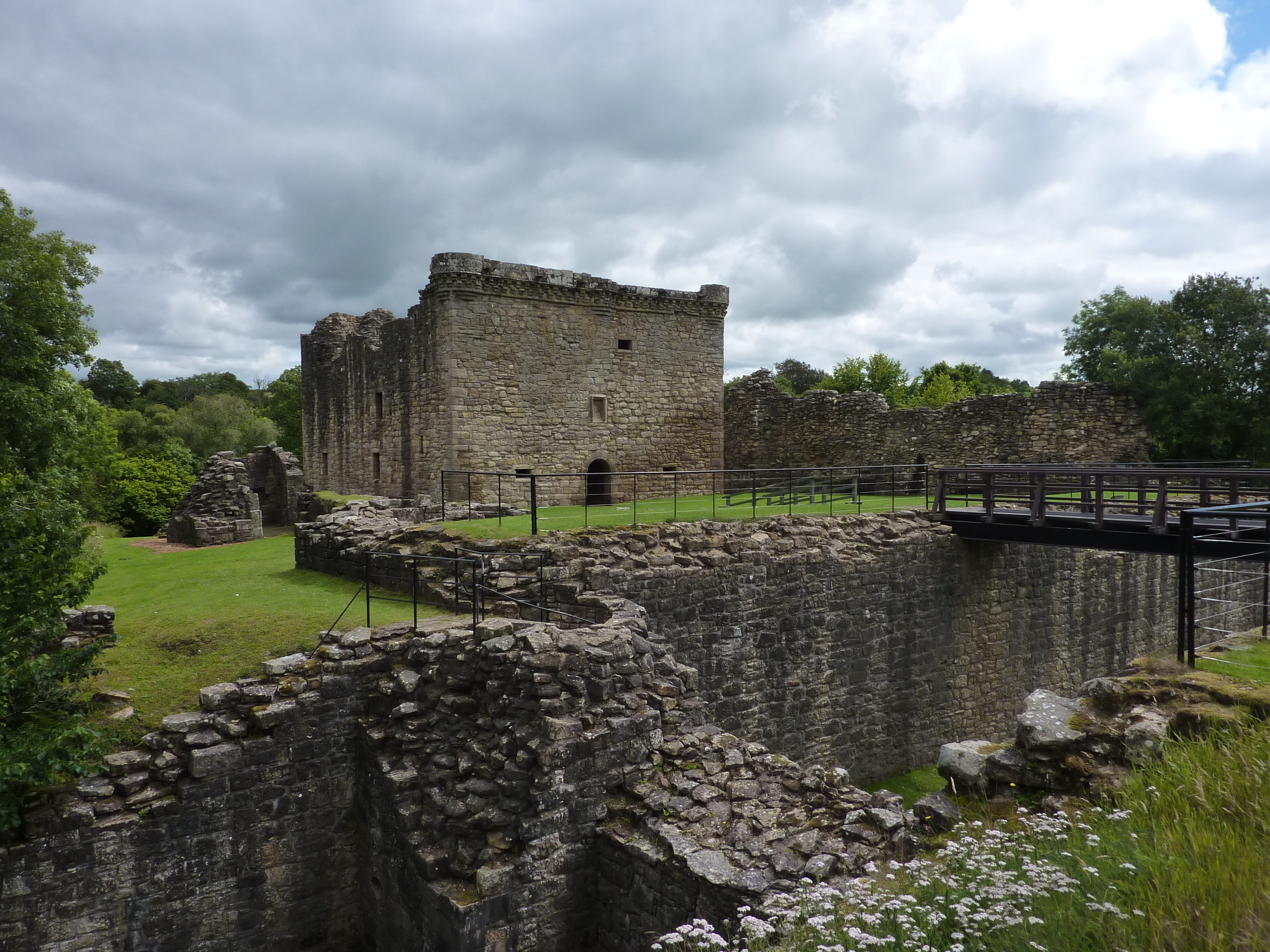
The Hamiltons of Goslington held Craignethan Castle during the Chaseabout Raid

== Career ==
Andrew Hamilton of Goslington and his brother John Hamilton of Newtoun helped to hold Craignethan Castle against Mary, Queen of Scots and Lord Darnley during the Chaseabout Raid rebellion in 1565. They were forgiven in a royal remission of 2 January 1566.

James Hamilton, 3rd Earl of Arran had been imprisoned in Edinburgh Castle as a suspect traitor. He suffered from mental health issues. In 1566 he was allowed to live at Hamilton Castle. A number of members of the Hamilton family, including Andrew Hamilton of Goslington, undertook to be "cautioners" for his good behaviour.

Andrew Hamilton of Goslington was at Hamilton before the battle of Langside on 8 May 1568, and his name, as "Silvertoun knight" appears on the bond signed by Mary's supporters. He was forfeited for treason by Regent Moray in Parliament in Edinburgh on 19 August 1568 for his support of Mary, Queen of Scots, after her escape from Lochleven Castle, having fought for her at the battle of Langside.

In July 1570, he was accused with Claud Hamilton and others, of making plans to ambush Regent Lennox and the Earl of Mar in Callender Wood. John Hamilton, Archbishop of St Andrews denied his own involvement in this plan during his trial in April 1571.

In March 1575 Andrew's brother, John Hamilton, was among the Hamiltons who made peace with Regent Morton on the issue of a murder in March 1575 at Holyroodhouse, after handing their swords to the Captain of Edinburgh Castle, George Douglas of Parkhead.

In 1579 the Hamiltons were suppressed for their support for Queen Mary, and for the murders of Regent Moray and Regent Lennox. The family fortified their houses and castles. On 18 May 1579, Sir James Hamilton younger (of Libberton) helped the King's forces take Craignethan Castle. According to the contemporary historian David Moysie, he won the castle 'upone ane accident'. Hamilton (Cadzow Castle) was bombarded by royal gunner Michael Gardiner, and fell on 19 May. "John Hamilton of Sillertoun" was captured at Hamilton, regarded with others as a suspect in the deaths of the Regents. Caution or bail was found for Andrew Hamilton of Goslington, who like his brother, had remained loyal to the leaders of the Hamilton family. Hamilton of Libberton was requested by the Privy Council of Scotland to demolish or slight Craignethan, a castle built by his grandfather James Hamilton of Finnart.

== Family ==
Andrew Hamilton's wife's name is unknown. Their children included:

- Robert Hamilton of Silvertonhill, who married Elizabeth Bailie of Provan Hall in 1580, a daughter of the lawyer William Baillie, Lord Provand. She was menaced by the Hamiltons of Libberton at the Mains of Craig, their property and farm near Strathaven, at harvest and plough time in 1596 and 1597, and shots were fired at her steward, the officer of Craig. Their children included the poet Francis Hamilton of Silvertonhill.
- John Hamilton of Tweediesyde
- Andrew Hamilton
