= Alexander Home of North Berwick =

Scottish landowner

Alexander Home of North Berwick (floruit 1570–1597) was a Scottish landowner and Provost of Edinburgh.

== Career ==
His surname is sometimes spelled "Hume". He was a son of Patrick Home of Polwarth (d. 1578) and Elizabeth Hepburn (d. 1571) daughter of Patrick Hepburn of Waughton, and a younger brother of the courtier and poet Patrick Hume of Polwarth (d. 1599).

He obtained the lands of North Berwick priory from his younger sister Margaret Home, the last Prioress, in 1562.

The English diplomat Thomas Randolph mentioned him as a mutual friend of the envoy Nicolas Elphinstone in 1571.

He joined the court of James VI in October 1580 as a gentleman of the bedchamber, and was sent as an envoy to Queen Elizabeth. At first she refused to meet him in person in response to the treatment of her ambassador Robert Bowes in Edinburgh, and her disapproval of the king's favourite Esmé Stewart, Duke of Lennox. Home was then allowed to discuss this matter, border administration, redress for losses to English pirates, and the rendition of a border reiver called Ekkie Turnbull. Lennox was said to be displeased with Elizabeth's answers and Home's efforts.

In July 1592 he was made captain of Tantallon Castle.

== Provost of Edinburgh ==
He was Provost of Edinburgh from 1593 to 1597, the leader of the town's council.

In August 1592 the "goodman of North Berwick" and other members of the Home family were said to be in Anne of Denmark's disfavour.

On Tuesday, 24 July 1593 the rebel Francis Stewart, 5th Earl of Bothwell smuggled himself into Holyroodhouse and forced himself into the King's presence, in his bedchamber. Home came to the palace to help, but the king said things were fine. On 3 April 1594 he fought in a battle at Leith against the rebel Earl using the town's artillery.

On 30 June 1594 Home was at North Berwick and received news that the Earl of Bothwell and his companions were in Edinburgh and their horses were nearby at Dean Mills. Home returned and captured the horses and shut the town's gates, but failed to arrest the earl.

In January 1595 he captured James Scott of Balwearie an agent of the rebel earls. Around this time, Home and the English diplomat Robert Bowes took witness statements from the crew of the Bruce, a ship owned by George Bruce of Carnock which had been commandeered by English privateers off the coast of Spain and forced to take on board a number of enslaved Africans.

He died on 22 July 1597. His will mentions his farm and livestock at the Mains of North Berwick. He wished to buried beside his wife who had pre-deceased him. A daughter, who name is unknown, had a family with William Baillie of Lamington, their children included the soldier William Baillie.

A letter from the king in October 1598 about a shipping case involving George Bruce of Carnock mentions he was deceased.

His brother Patrick's son was Alexander Home, minister of Logie in Stirlingshire, see Fasti Ecclesiae Scoticanae Vol IV, p. 354..

== Properties ==
His lands at North Berwick included the rabbit warrens and links, fishing, Nungate at the Clarty Burn, the Law Meadow, Kinkeith mill, land at Benestoun, and a granary at the Overmill of Linton on Tyne.
