= Monkton Windmill =

Windmill in South Ayrshire, Scotland

Monkton Mill, Monkton
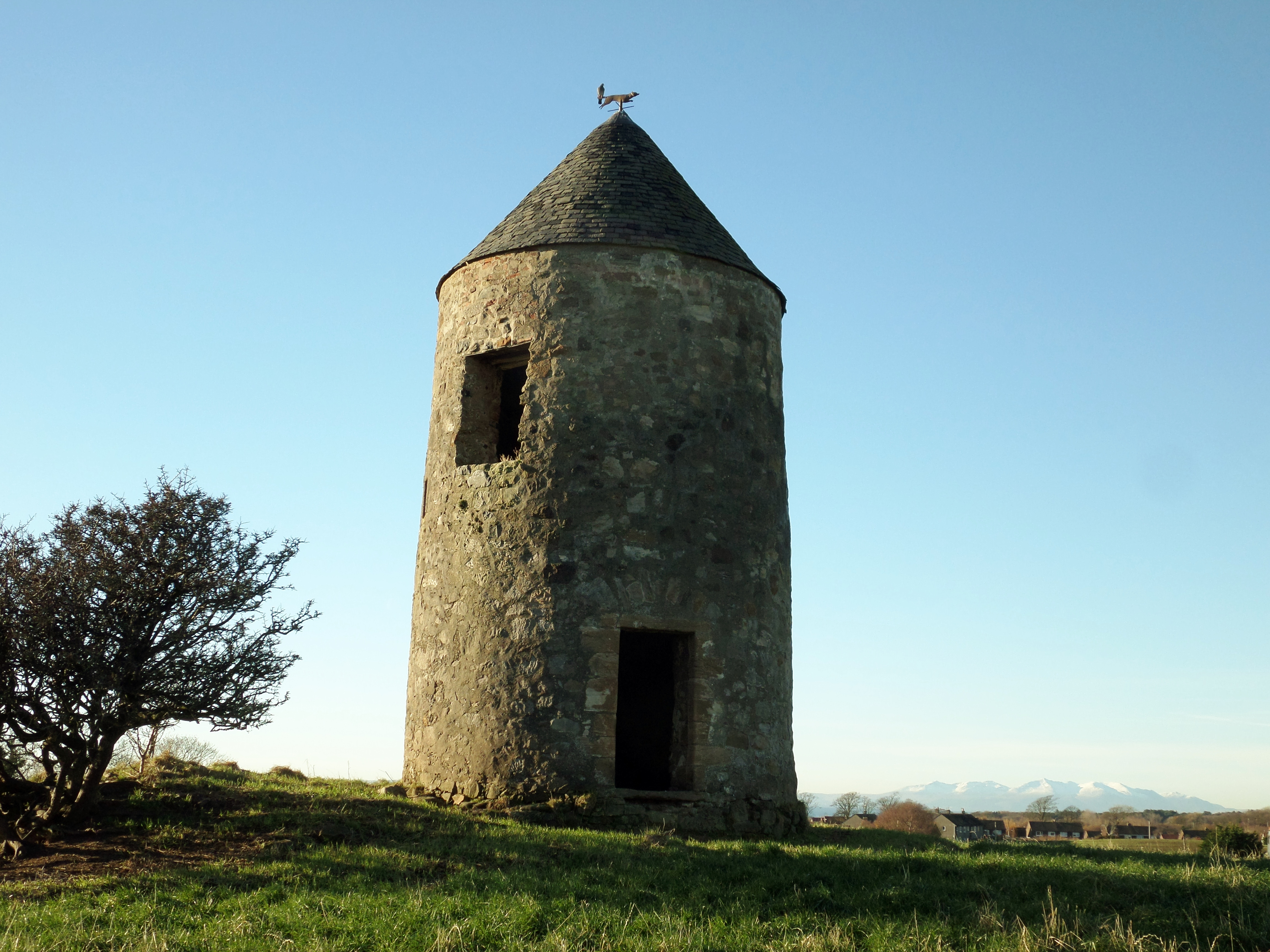
- Monkton Windmill

Origin
- Mill name: Monkton Vaulted Tower Mill
- Grid reference: NS 36209 28048
- Coordinates: 55.518628°N 4.5958582°W
- Operator(s): Disused
- Year built: Early 18th Century

Information
- Type: Vaulted Tower Mill
- Storeys: Two
- No. of sails: Four
- Other information: Converted to a dovecote in the early 19th Century.

The Monkton Windmill, or Monkton Dovecote, was originally an early 18th century vaulted tower windmill located on the outskirts of the village of Monkton on the site of an Iron Age hillfort in South Ayrshire, Scotland. It was later converted into a dovecote and stood on the lands of the old Orangefield Estate.

== Infrastructure ==
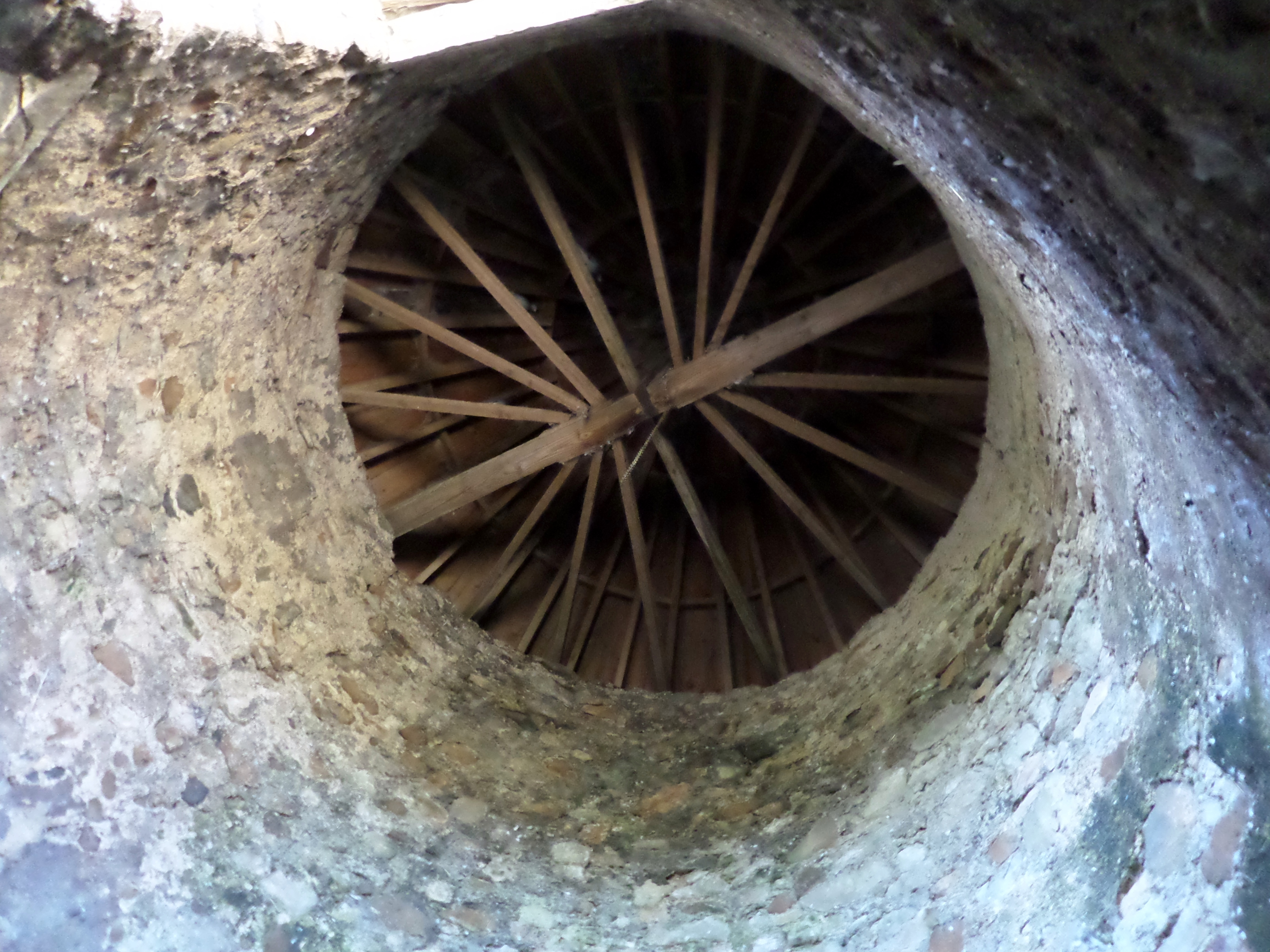
The roof timbers.

The circa 9m high shell of this early 18th century vaulted tower windmill is 3.35m in diameter within, at ground level, walls with rubble walls 0.9m thick rising from a stone platform. The tower slightly tapers towards the top so that it does not become top heavy or distorted and the original wooden windcap and sails are absent. It has a well constructed vaulted basement 6 metres in length and has two storeys topped by a slated conical roof. A pair of opposed doorways once existed, set at ground level and there are two small windows on the first floor with a larger more recent south opening window.

In the early 19th century the windmill tower was converted for use as a dovecot or doocot. It once had a potence used to reach the nesting boxes and fireclay nesting boxes.

== History ==
Monkton is a vaulted tower mill, a mill type that is rare in the UK outside Scotland The first record of the Monkton Windmill is 1773 and it was converted into a dovecote with fire-clay nesting boxes and a potence in the early 19th century. In 1971 the windmill was given a Grade A Listing. The tower was known locally in the 19th century by the Scots term 'Dooket'.

Dovecotes or 'Doocots' were a feature of most country estates and Orangefield was no exception. Such buildings provided a valuable source of fresh meat and eggs, adding variety to meals in the winter months. The large amounts of droppings, which built up on the doocot's floors, made a valuable general fertiliser and was also used in the production of gunpowder and in such processes as the dyeing of linen and in tanning leather.

Windmills were often built in areas of low rainfall or where the land was flat and the water current sluggish however in this coastal location the advantage was the expectation of strong winds at all times of the year.

The 1775 Armstrong map clearly shows a working windmill at Monkton with four sails.

== Workings details ==
This type of windmill is described as "...a fixed tower surmounted by a movable cap which supported the sails. The windcap was turned into the wind by hand. The structure, built of local materials, often stone rubble, stood on an artificial mound over a stone-built vaulted chamber or cellar. The latter often extended outwards from the base of the mill and provided a third floor, which acted as a receiving and dispatching room." The interior of the old windmill tower contained brick pigeon-holes in 1954 however these had been removed by 1980 and the tower had been re-roofed with a conical slated roof. Commonly the windcap could be moved by hand to face the wind using a pole.

Scottish windmills, as with watermills, were basically meal-mills, mainly producing wheaten and oaten meals as well as ground barley and bruised corn.

Dovecotes had nesting boxes lining the interior and a potence or ladder-like wooden structure that gave easy access to the nest holes.

== The site today ==
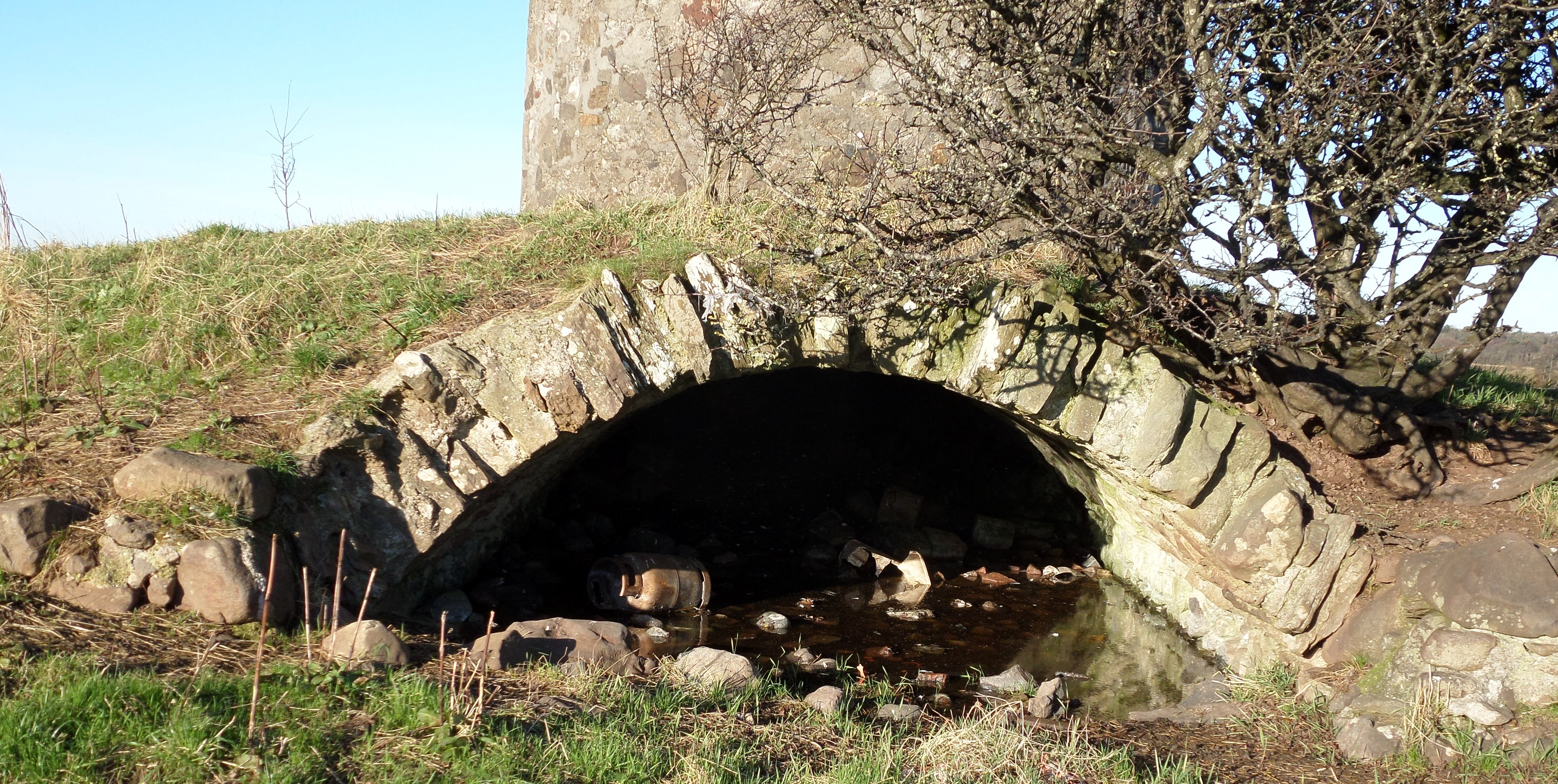
The vault and tower of the old windmill.

The mill has a slated conical roof surmounted by a probable weather vane in the form of a running fox or dog. The east facing door is not bricked up unlike the west facing door, the position of which is only visible in outline. The vault is in good condition except at the original external entrance, however it is substantially infilled with earth and stones. Two small windows remain with a single larger one facing south. No remnants of the windmill machinery survive and the pigeon nest boxes have been removed although several visible square stones may represent elements of nesting holes. The mill clearly stands on a substantial stone platform.

== Monkton Hillfort ==
An oval plan Iron Age hill fort with three ditches and an entrance to the north-west is visible in aerial photographs with the windmill standing within its former central area.

== Micro-history ==
A number of old windmills that were no longer required were converted to other uses such as barns, stores, ice-houses, look-out towers and dovecotes. Monkton is a typical example of a vaulted tower mill, as are those at Sauchie, Dunbarney, Gordonstoun and Ballantrae.

The James Macrae Monument or 'Orangefield Family Burial Ground' stands nearby and commemorates the owner of the old Orangefield Estate on which the farm of Whiteside and Monkton Windmill come dovecote stands.

In 1828 a 'Millfarm' is marked on Thomson's map where Whiteside Farm now stands. A Whiteside House is shown.
