= George Hamilton (1805 moderator) =

Church of Scotland minister (1757–1832)

George Hamilton (1757–1832) was a Church of Scotland minister who served as Moderator of the General Assembly in 1805.

== Life ==
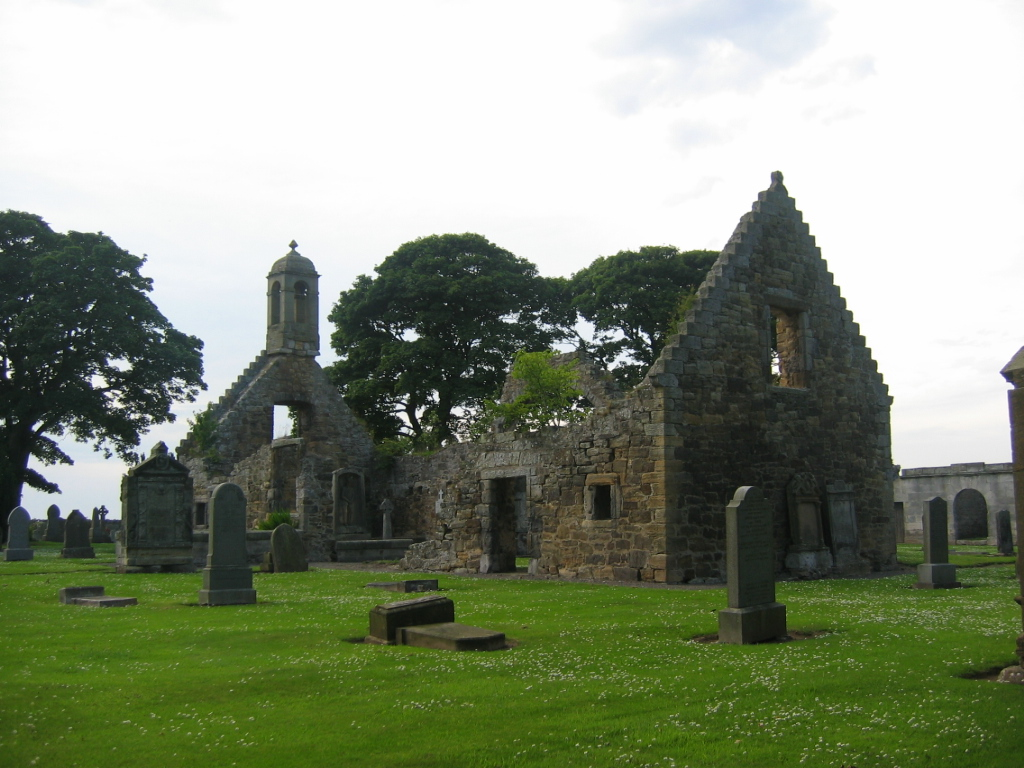
Gladsmuir Old Kirk

He was born on 15 May 1757, the son of Rev John Hamilton (1714–1797) minister of Bolton, East Lothian and his wife Jean Wight of Dumfries. He was educated at the High School in Edinburgh and attended both Edinburgh University and Glasgow University. He graduated MA in 1775. He originally trained as a lawyer and entered the Inner Temple in London.

After a strong change of heart, he decided to follow in his father's footsteps, becoming a minister of the Church of Scotland. He was licensed by the Presbytery of Haddington in April 1788. In April 1790, he was ordained as minister of Gladsmuir in East Lothian, close to his home, under the patronage of King George III. He remained in this role for the rest of his life.

In 1797 he was an unsuccessful candidate for the chair of Moral Philosophy at Glasgow University. In 1804 he was awarded an honorary Doctor of Divinity from Glasgow University. In 1805 he succeeded Rev John Inglis as Moderator of the General Assembly of the Church of Scotland the highest position in the Scottish church.

He died in the manse at Gladsmuir on 4 September 1832.

== Family ==
His older brother Robert Hamilton emigrated to Canada and was a successful politician.

In May 1790 he married Elizabeth Dickson (d.1825) daughter of John Dickson of Conheath, Provost of Dumfries. Their children included:

- John James Hamilton HEICS (1792–1831)
- William Law Hamilton (1792–1796) twin of John
- Rev George Hamilton minister of Kirkcudbright
- Helen Wight Hamilton (1797–1822)
- Jean Bell Hamilton (1799–1876)
- Margaret Coates Hamilton (1800–1832) married Rev Adam Forman of Innerwick

== Publications ==
- The Telegraph, a Political Poem

== Trivia ==
Robert Burns referred to Rev. Hamilton in his poem "The Reproof" (often called "The Reply").
