= William Baillie, Lord Provand =

Scottish judge

William Baillie, Lord Provand (died 26 May 1593) was a Scottish judge from Lamington.

== Career ==
He first appears as a judge of the court of session, 15 November 1550. In March 1567 Mary, Queen of Scots granted her "well-beloved clerk and counsellor" the reward of a 19 lease or tack of her incomes from the Parsonage of Glasgow and the lands of Provand.

He was appointed president of the court on the death of John Sinclair, Bishop of Brechin, in 1566. On 6 December 1567, he was deprived of this office, in favour of Sir James Balfour, by Regent Moray, on the pretext that the act of institution required it to be held by a person of the spiritual estate. Balfour was in turn removed in 1568, when he was accused of participation in Darnley's murder, and Baillie, being reinstated, held the office till his death, 26 May 1593.

== Provan Hall ==
After the Scottish Reformation, Provan Hall near Glasgow became a residence of William Baillie. In 1566 he was a collector of the teinds or tithes known as the "Thirds of Benefices" for the parsonage of Glasgow. He also received a pension from Queen Mary from the "Thirds" of £40 Scots annually.

As a judge, he was known as Lord Provand. He married Elizabeth Durham. Their daughter and heiress of Provan, Elizabeth Baillie, married Robert Hamilton, a son of Andrew Hamilton of Goslington. She passed the ownership of Provan Hall to their eldest son, Francis Hamilton of Silvertonhill in 1599.
