= Robert Hamilton (merchant) =

Upper Canada merchant and politician

Robert Hamilton (1787–1856) was a merchant and political figure in Upper Canada.

He was born at Fort Niagara in 1787, the son of Robert Hamilton and brother of George Hamilton.

He settled at Queenston where he was a merchant, farmer and shipbuilder. He was a lieutenant-colonel in the regional militia and became a justice of the peace in the Niagara District in 1823. He represented the 3rd riding of Lincoln in the 8th Parliament of Upper Canada.

He died at Queenston in 1856.
