= Auchinbaird Windmill =

Windmill in Clackmannanshire, Scotland

Auchinbaird Windmill,
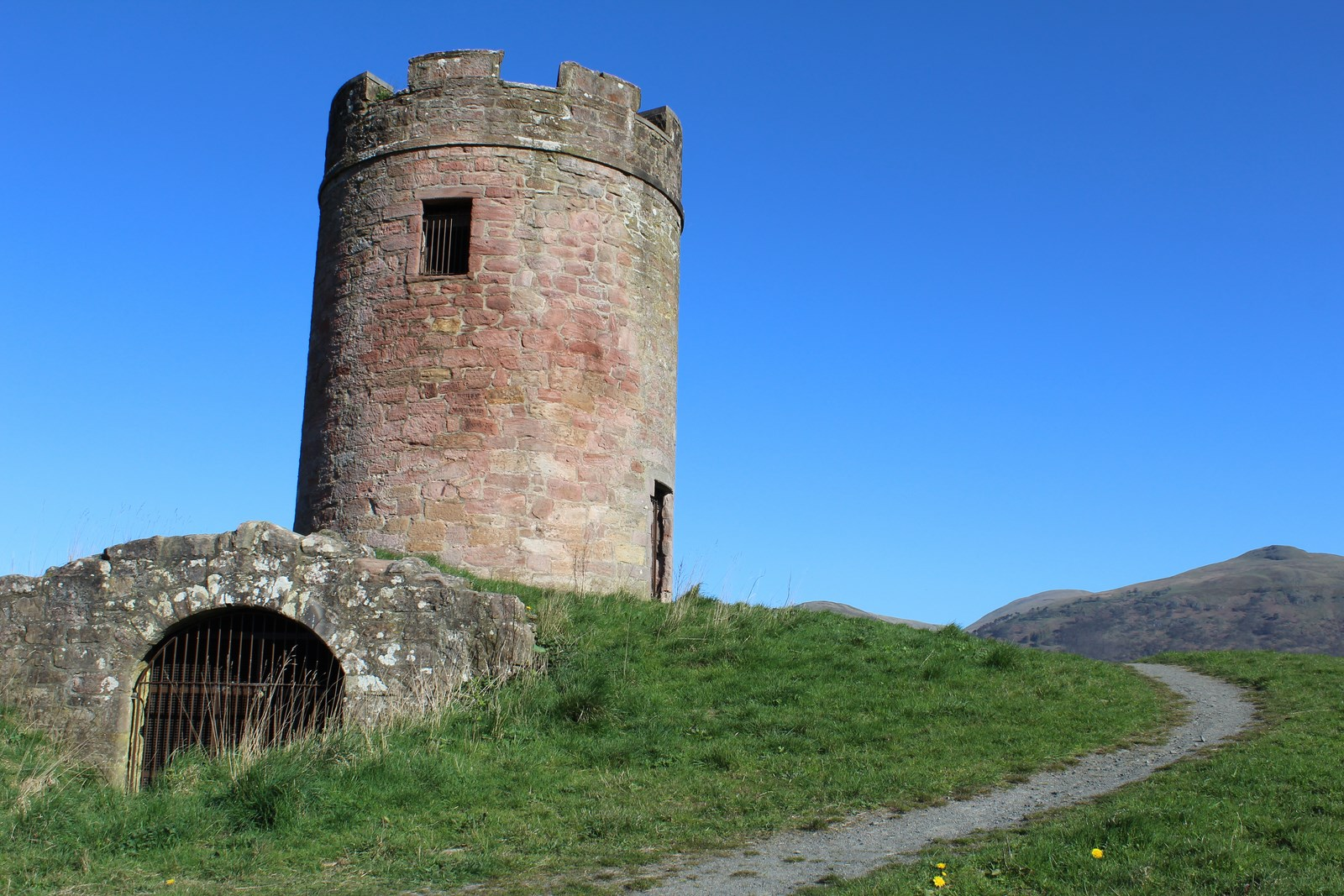
- Auchinbaird Windmill and later a dovecote

Origin
- Mill name: Auchinbaird Vaulted Tower Windmill
- Mill location: Sauchie, Clackmannanshire
- Grid reference: NS 89822 94984
- Coordinates: 56.134802°N 3.7744099°W
- Operator(s): Disused
- Year built: 17th or 18th Century

Information
- Purpose: Grain mill and later a dovecote
- Type: Vaulted Tower Mill
- Storeys: Two
- Other information: Converted to a dovecote in the early 19th Century.

Auchinbaird Windmill or New Sauchie Windmill, was originally a late 17th or early 18th century vaulted tower grain windmill built into a low ridge located on the outskirts of the town of Sauchie, Clackmannanshire, Scotland. It was later converted into the Auchinbaird Dovecote or New Sauchie Dovecote, abandoned at an unknown date and later conserved as a landscape feature and visitor attraction.

== Infrastructure ==
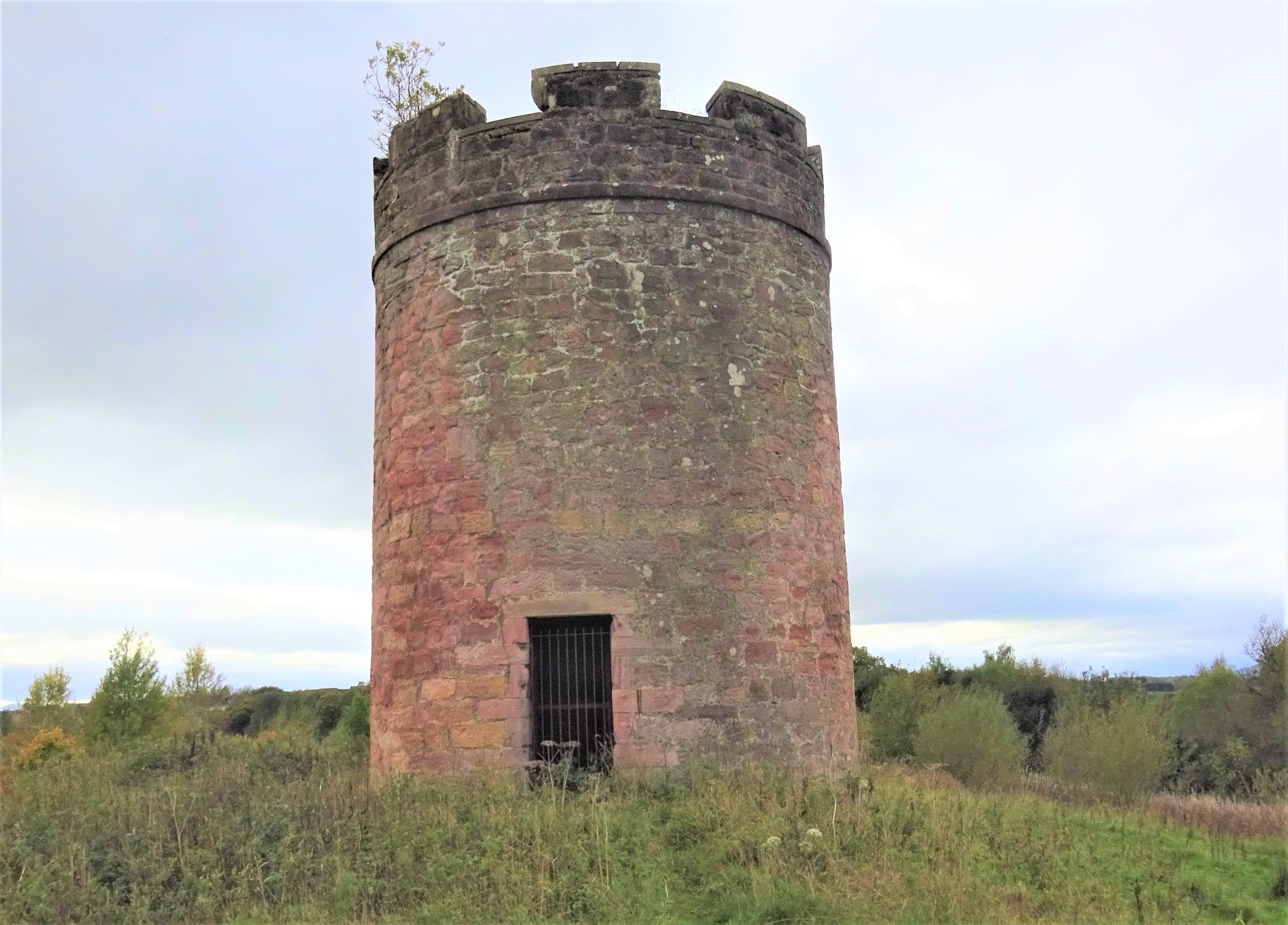
The windmill/dovecote and the doors

The structure stands on the edge of ridge at a height of 53 metres or 173 feet. The circular walled shell of this late 17th or early 18th century vaulted tower windmill has red sandstone rubble walls rising from the partly exposed foundations. The tower does not appear to taper towards the top, but may have been reduced in height. The original wooden windcap that would have formed a third story and the wood and fabric sails are absent. It had a well constructed vaulted basement and access pend area. The stone tower had two storeys and was later topped by a brick built domed roof with an oculus or circular hole and a castellated parapet. A pair of opposed doorways are set at ground level and there appears to have been one small north facing opening on the ground floor together with a larger south opening window on the first floor.

In the early 19th century the windmill tower was converted for use as a dovecot or doocot with the aforementioned pierced brick built domed roof added, a so-called decorative 'rat course' and a castelleated parapet. The area below the tower connecting with the vaulted entrance has been infilled. It would have had a potence of some description, used to reach the nesting boxes that have since been removed. It is a scheduled monument.

== History ==
Auchinbaird was a nearby farm and the name is often applied to this vaulted tower windmill, a construction type that is rare in the UK outside Scotland It was converted into a dovecote sometime before 1860 with nesting boxes and a potence. Dovecotes or 'Doocots' were a feature of many country estates. Such buildings provided a valuable source of fresh meat and eggs, adding variety to meals, especially in the winter months. The large amounts of droppings, which built up on the doocot's floors, made a valuable general fertiliser and was also used in the production of gunpowder and in such processes as the dyeing of linen and in tanning leather.

Windmills were often built in areas of low rainfall or where the land was flat and the water current sluggish, however in this location the advantage was the expectation of suitable winds in post-harvest months. It is not at present known when Auchinbaird dovecote was abandoned.

== Workings details ==
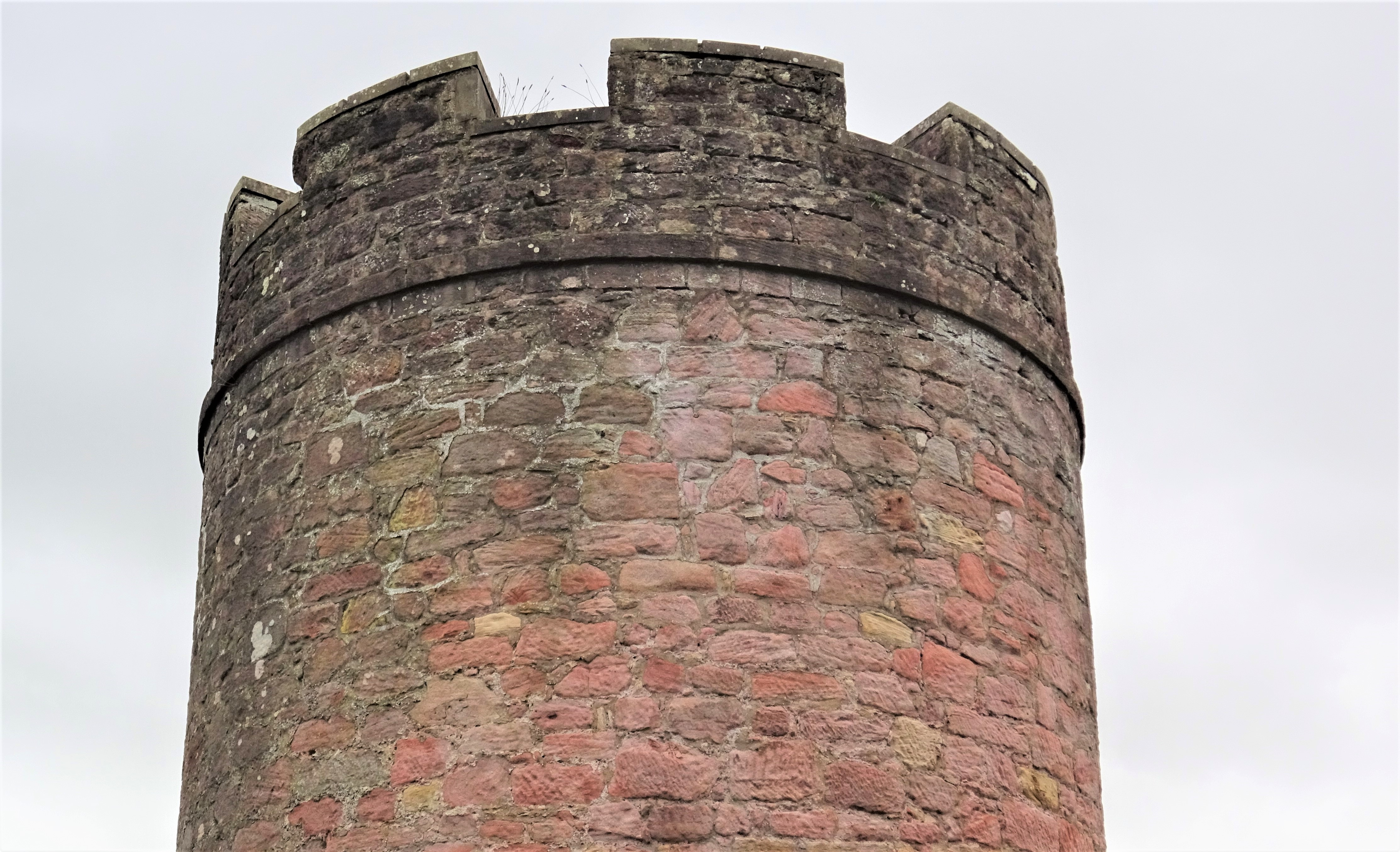
Detail of the castellations and the so-called 'rat course'.

This type of windmill is described as "...a fixed tower surmounted by a movable cap which supported the sails. The windcap was turned into the wind by hand. The structure, built of local materials, often stone rubble, stood on an artificial mound over a stone-built vaulted chamber or cellar. The latter often extended outwards from the base of the mill and provided a third floor, which acted as a receiving and dispatching room." The interior of the old windmill tower later contained pigeon-holes carried on brick arches, however these have been removed. Nothing remains of the potence.

The two doors lie opposite and would have provided light and a through draught to lower the levels of husk, flour, etc. in the air. The large upper window provided sufficient light for the miller to work in that area. The vaulted access at the front allowed for horse-drawn carts to enter with grain for milling and to take away the finished product. An access lane would have led up to the mill for use by local farmers, etc. Scottish windmills, as with watermills, were basically meal-mills, mainly producing wheaten and oaten meals as well as ground barley and bruised corn.

== The site today ==
The mill has tourist attraction style signage. The dedicated paths leading up the hill are not at present maintained (datum 2021). The two facing doorways are closed over by double metal grills. The vault entrance is covered with double metal grills and has become overgrown with vegetation, but is in good condition. The vaulted area is infilled below the mill tower. The one north opening is blocked, but the single larger one is open, facing south. No remnants of the windmill machinery survive and the pigeon nest boxes have been removed, although the outlines can still be seen on the inside wall.

== Micro-history ==
A number of old windmills that were no longer required were converted to other uses such as barns, stores, ice-houses, look-out towers and dovecotes. Auchinbaird is a typical example of a vaulted tower mill, as are those at Monkton, Dunbarney, Gordonstoun and Ballantrae.
