= Hoprig, East Lothian =

Hoprig, is a small farm and former lordship in the parish of Gladsmuir, East Lothian, Scotland.

William de Baillie of Hoprig, was a jury member at an inquest concerning forfeited lands in Lothian between 1311 and 1312.
