= Lamington Tower =

Castle in South Lanarkshire, Scotland

Coordinates: 55°34′15″N 3°37′08″W

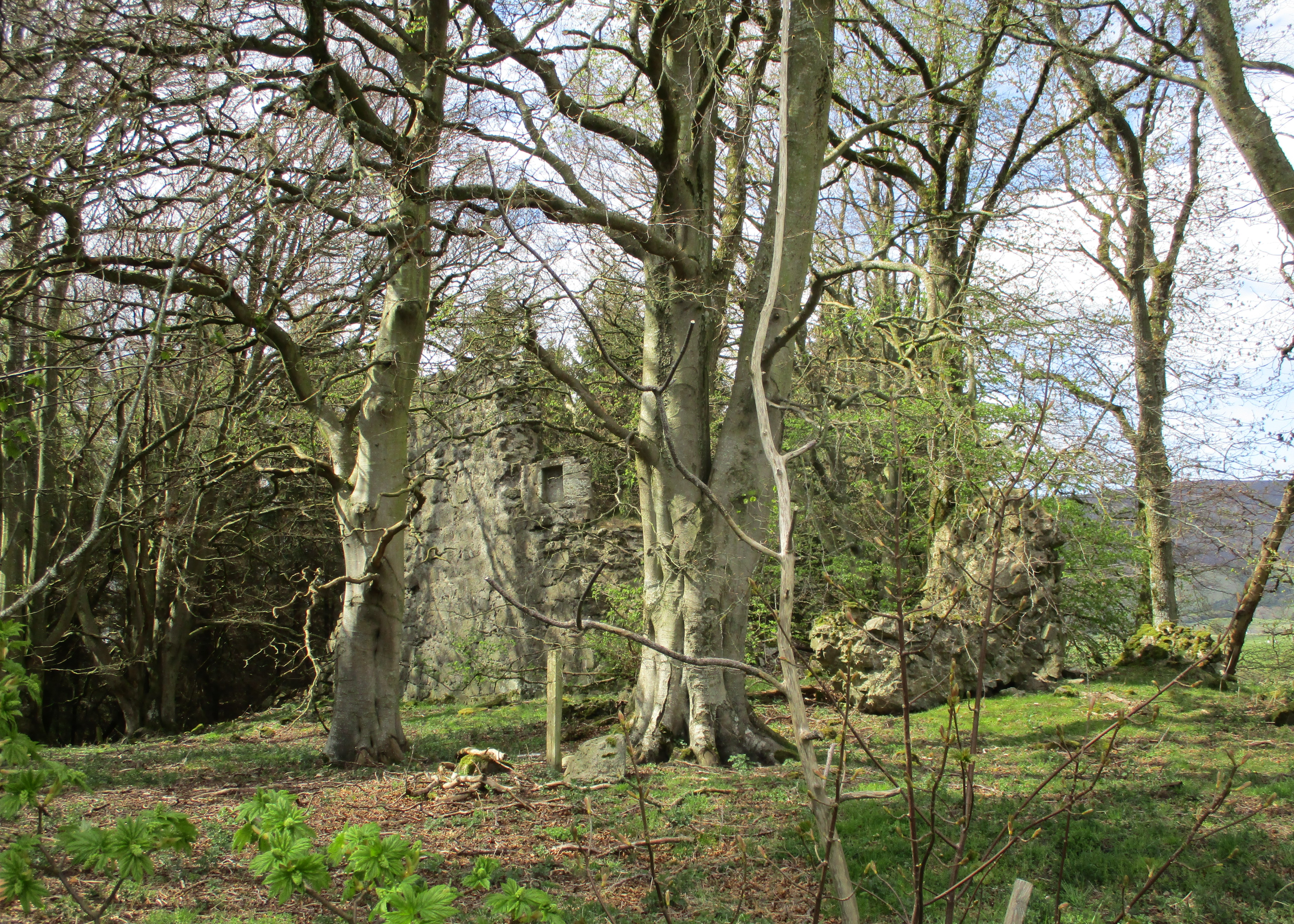

Lamington Tower was a 16th-century tower house, constructed by William Baillie of Lamington, near Lamington, South Lanarkshire, Scotland. The tower house was occupied until the 18th century when it was blown up to provide building materials.

The tower perimeter measures 38.75 feet (11.81 m) by 31.75 feet (9.68 m) and the ground floor was vaulted.
