= Lamington, South Lanarkshire =

Village in South Lanarkshire, Scotland

Coordinates: 55°33′46″N 3°37′06″W

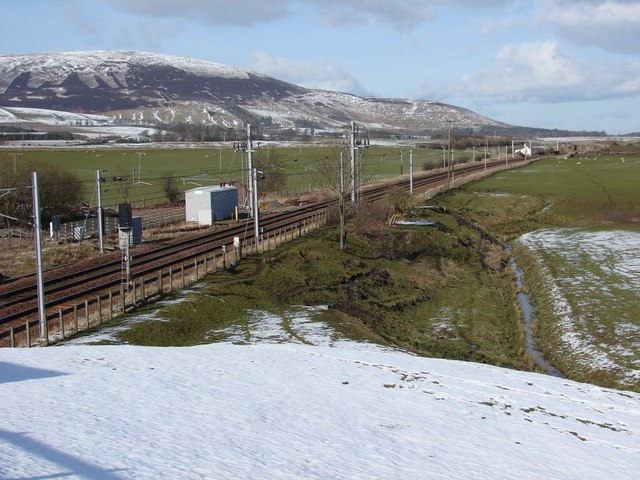
The disused railway station

Lamington is a conservation village in South Lanarkshire in Scotland, roughly between Biggar and Lanark and sits astride the A702 trunk road.

It is reputed to be the home of Marion Braidfute, legendary wife of William Wallace.

It has also been claimed that the village gave its name to the Lamington sponge cake popular in Australia.

The feudal barony of Lamington was granted to William de Baillie, 2nd of Hoprig, in 1368, who was the son-in-law of Sir William Seton. The caput of the barony was originally at Lamington Tower.

== Popular culture ==
Lamington features in the 1810 historical novel The Scottish Chiefs by Jane Porter.

== See also ==
- Baron Lamington
