= Dunbarney House Windmill =

Windmill in Perth and Kinross, Scotland

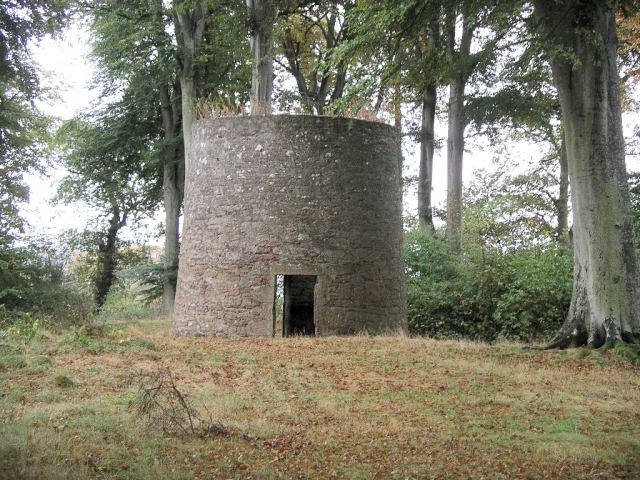
- The windmill in 2005

Origin
- Mill location: Bridge of Earn, Perth and Kinross, Scotland
- Grid reference: NO 107 184
- Coordinates: 56.349340°N 3.4459506°W
- Year built: Early 18th century

Information
- Type: Vaulted tower mill

Dunbarney House Windmill is located just to the southwest of Dunbarney House near the Scottish town of Bridge of Earn, Perth and Kinross. A vaulted tower mill dating to the early 18th century, it is now a Category B listed building.

A number of old windmills that were no longer required were converted to other uses such as barns, stores, ice-houses, look-out towers and dovecotes. Dunbarney is a typical example of a vaulted tower mill, as are those at Sauchie, Gordonstoun, Monkton and Ballantrae.
