= Gladsmuir =

Coordinates: 55.949°N 2.868°W

Gladsmuir: Scottish Gaelic: Sliabh a' Chlamhain
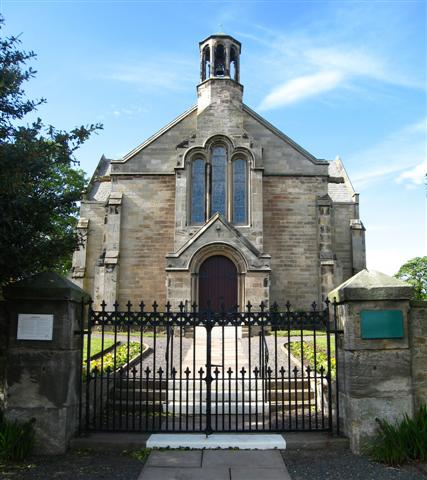
- Gladsmuir Parish Church

- Location within Scotland
- OS grid reference: NT457732
- Civil parish: Gladsmuir
- Council area: East Lothian Council
- Lieutenancy area: East Lothian
- Country: Scotland
- Sovereign state: United Kingdom
- Post town: TRANENT
- Postcode district: EH33
- Dialling code: 01875
- Police: Scotland
- Fire: Scottish
- Ambulance: Scottish
- UK Parliament: East Lothian
- Scottish Parliament: East Lothian

Gladsmuir (Scottish Gaelic: Sliabh a' Chlamhain) is a village and parish in East Lothian, Scotland, situated on the A199 and near Tranent and Prestonpans.

== Description ==
Gladsmuir's principal "claim to fame" relates to its role as the site of the Battle of Prestonpans (1745). Some sources – particularly maps – occasionally refer to the confrontation as the Battle of Gladsmuir. The Jacobite poet William Hamilton (1704–1754) wrote a poem entitled Ode on the Battle of Gladsmuir, 1745 in celebration of the battle.

The philanthropist George Heriot, jeweller to James VI, King of Scots and founder of Heriot's Hospital, (later George Heriot's School), in Edinburgh, may have been born in Gladsmuir, his father was.

Scottish writer George Godfrey Cunningham (c. 1802–1860) lived at Redcol in Gladsmuir parish.

== Church ==
Old Gladsmuir Parish Kirk dates from some time between 1650 and the creation of the parish in 1695 and its ruins stand to the north of the current operational church.

The replacement church is a Romanesque cruciform church dating from 1839 and designed by William Burn. The interior was destroyed by a fire in 1886 and restored by architect John Farquharson of Haddington with later improvements made in 1929. The older ruined kirk can still be seen and explored behind the new kirk. The graveyard contains interesting 18th century monuments and several CWGC graves from both world wars.

The manse dates from 1871 and stands to the north-east.

=== Notable Ministers ===
- Very Rev George Hamilton (1757–1832) minister of the parish from 1790 until death in 1832, Moderator of the General Assembly of the Church of Scotland in 1805.

== History ==
Gladsmuir parish was created in 1692 and in its original form it reached the southern shores of the Firth of Forth and extended to an area of 10 square miles. As well as the modern village of Gladsmuir the villages of Longniddry, Macmerry, Elvingston and Samuelston were within the newly created parish. The name Gladsmuir was originally 'Gledsmuir' and this name means 'the moor of the kite or hawk', gled being the Scots word for either a red kite or a common buzzard. There were limestone and coal deposits within the parish, as well as rich deposits of clay and iron and in the 19th century this was an industrial parish. Weaving dominated in Longniddry and Samuelston while there were iron works at Macmerry and limeworkings at Harlow. Distinctively white bricks and roof tiles were produced locally, while the coal mines employed 50 miners, in addition to 30 women and 36 boys in 1836. In the mid-20th century mining had mostly disappeared from the area; however, open-cast coal extraction continued at Blindwells up to the 1970s. The Great North Road between Edinburgh and London once passed through the parish, as does the railway lines to North Berwick and the south. In the 20th century Longniddry and Macmerry expanded and overtook Gladsmuir village in size and importance.

== Butterdean wood ==
Butterdean Wood is a mixed woodland of conifers and broad-leafed trees to the north of Gladsmuir which is owned by the Woodland Trust. It has a car park and two way-marked trails and contains a number of wildlife themed sculptures.

== Photo gallery ==
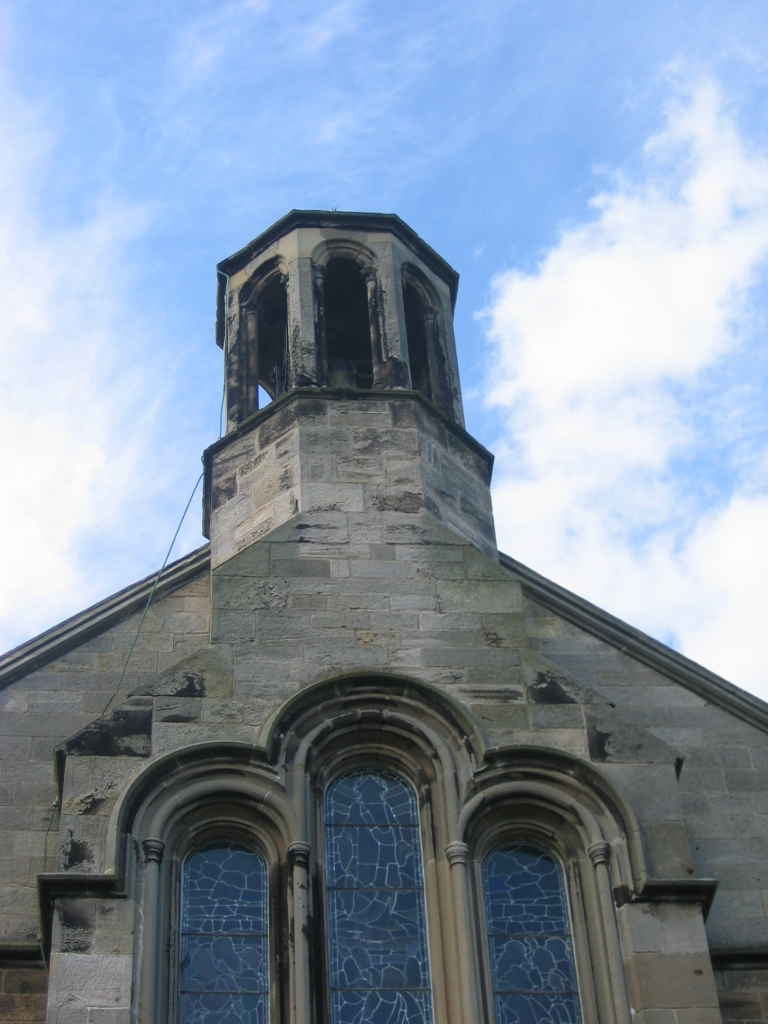
Gladsmuir Kirk

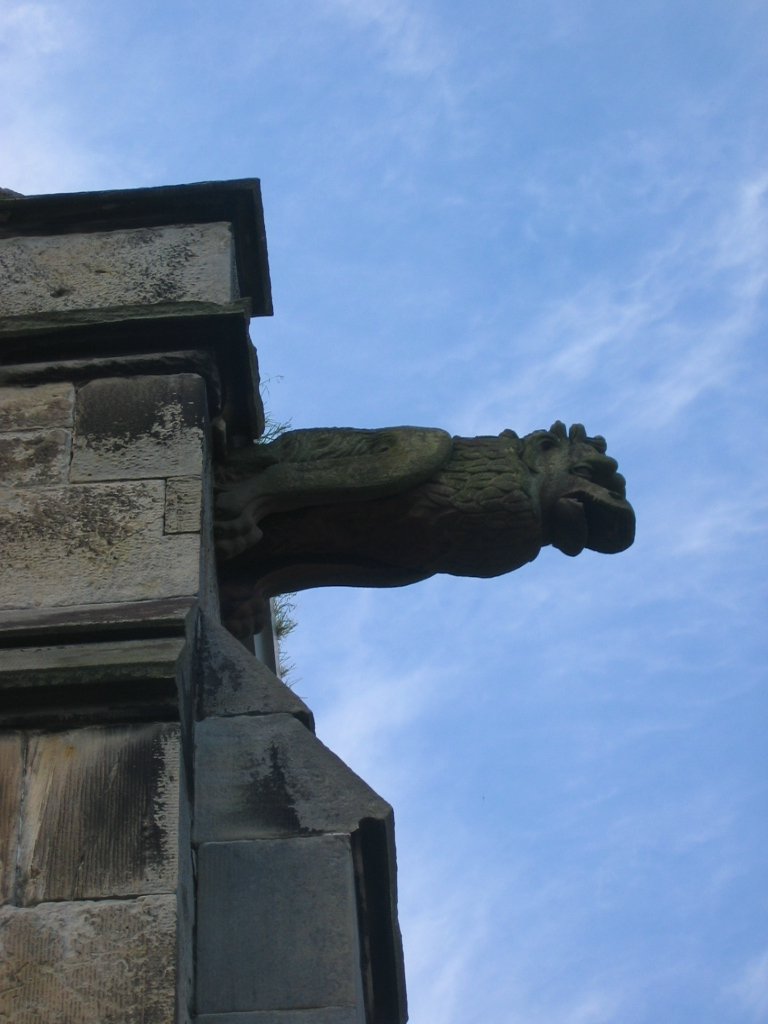
New Kirk gargoyle

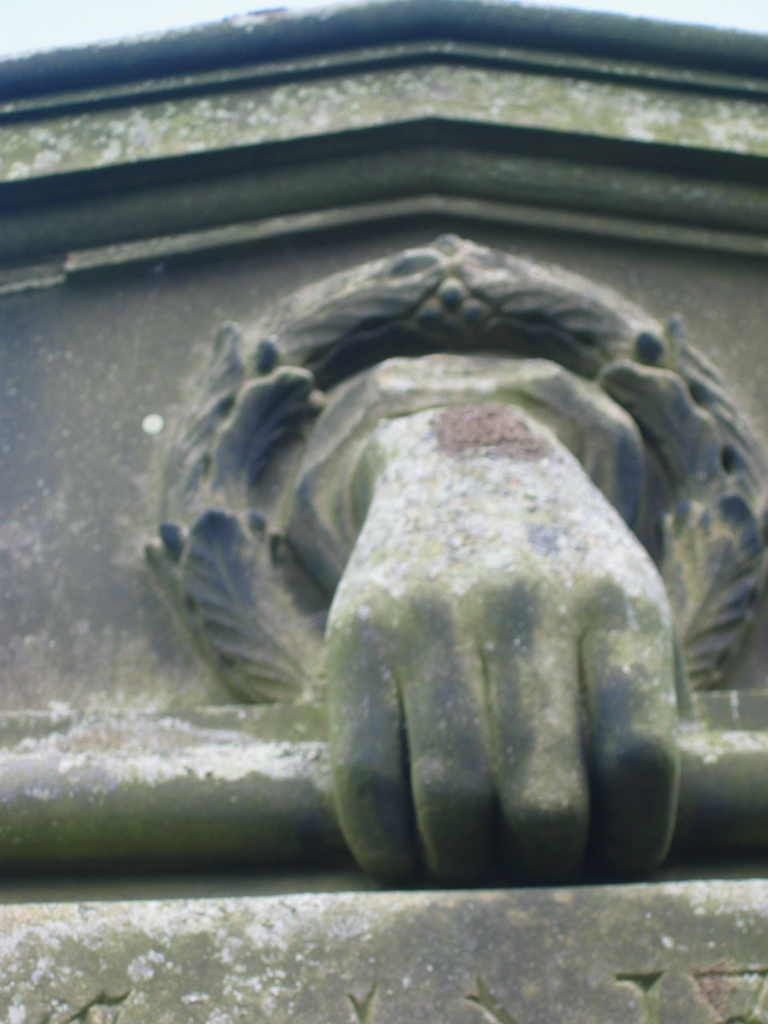
Tombstone detail

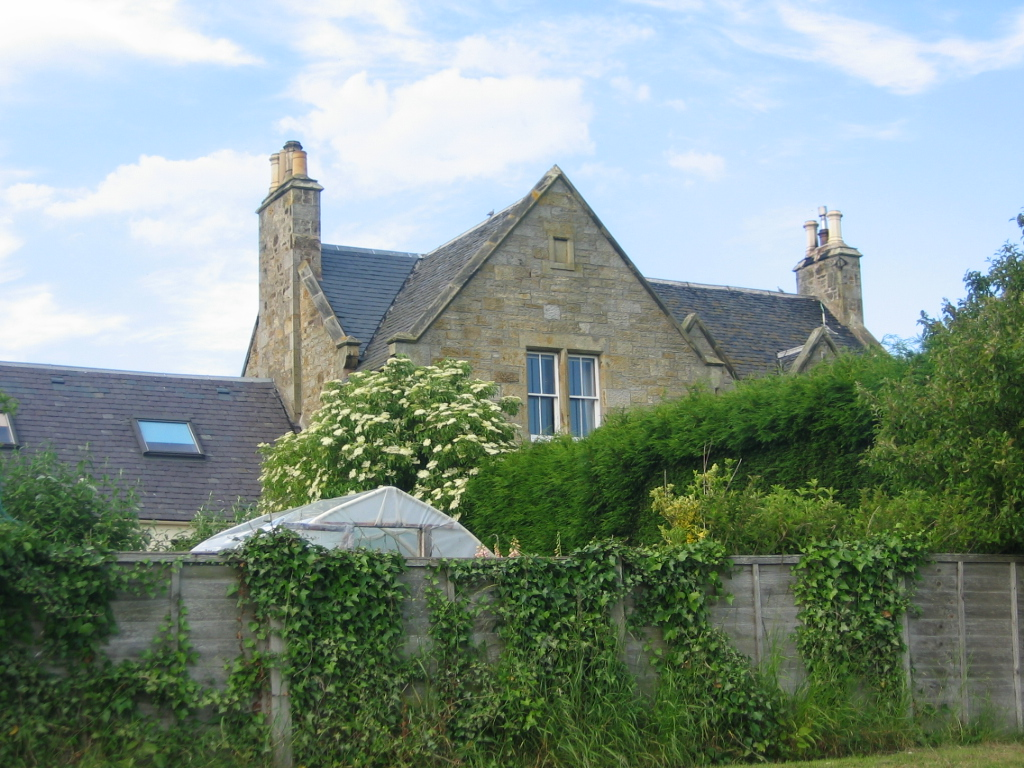
The Old School House

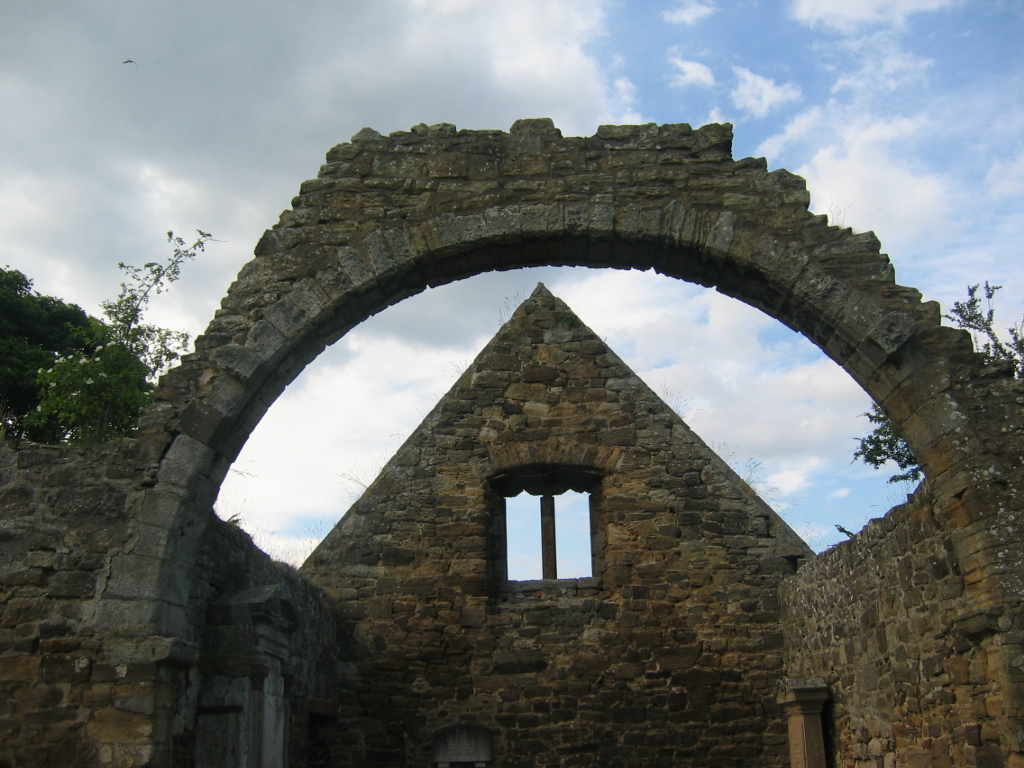
Old Kirk

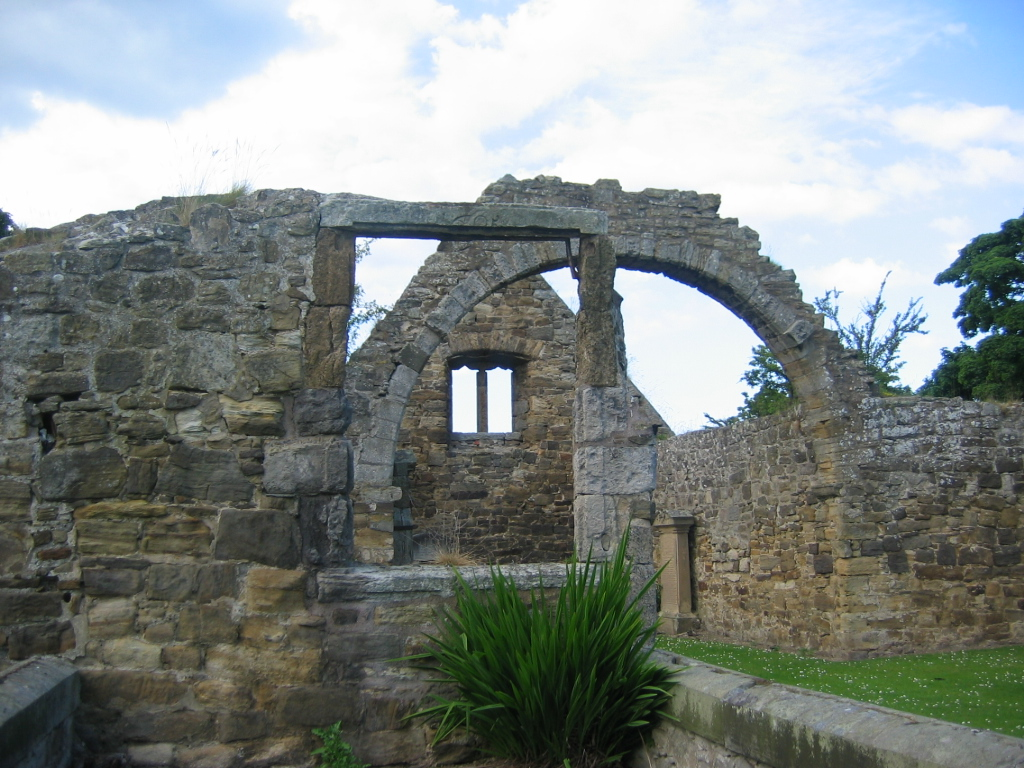
Old Kirk

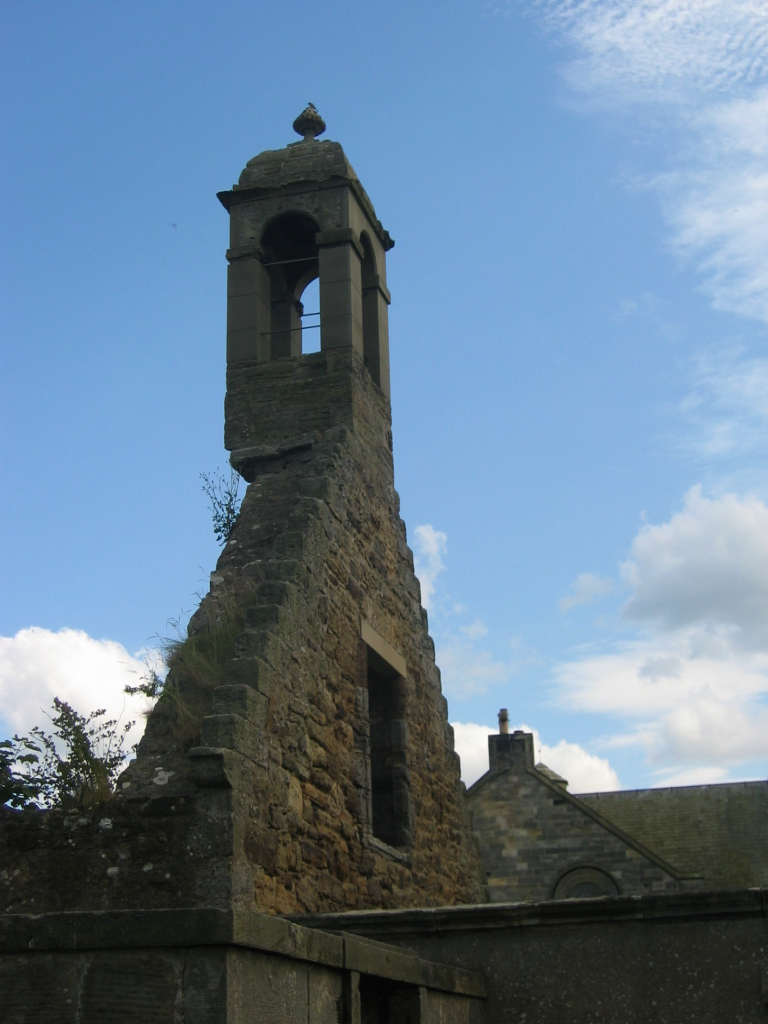
Ruined belltower

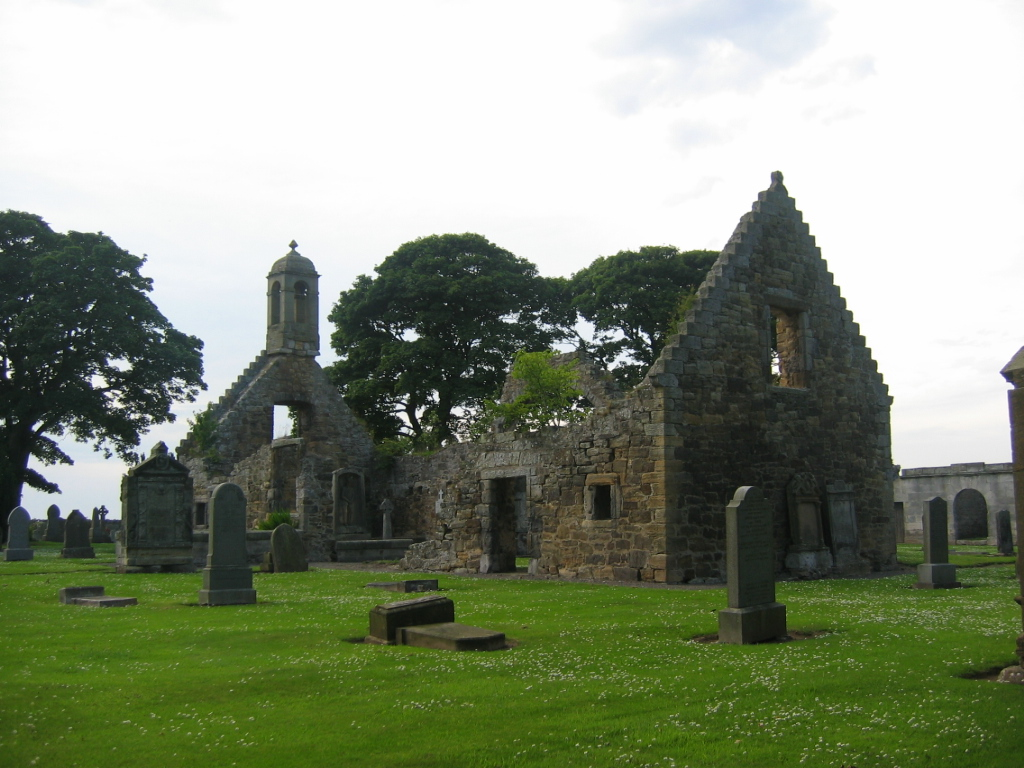
The Auld Kirk

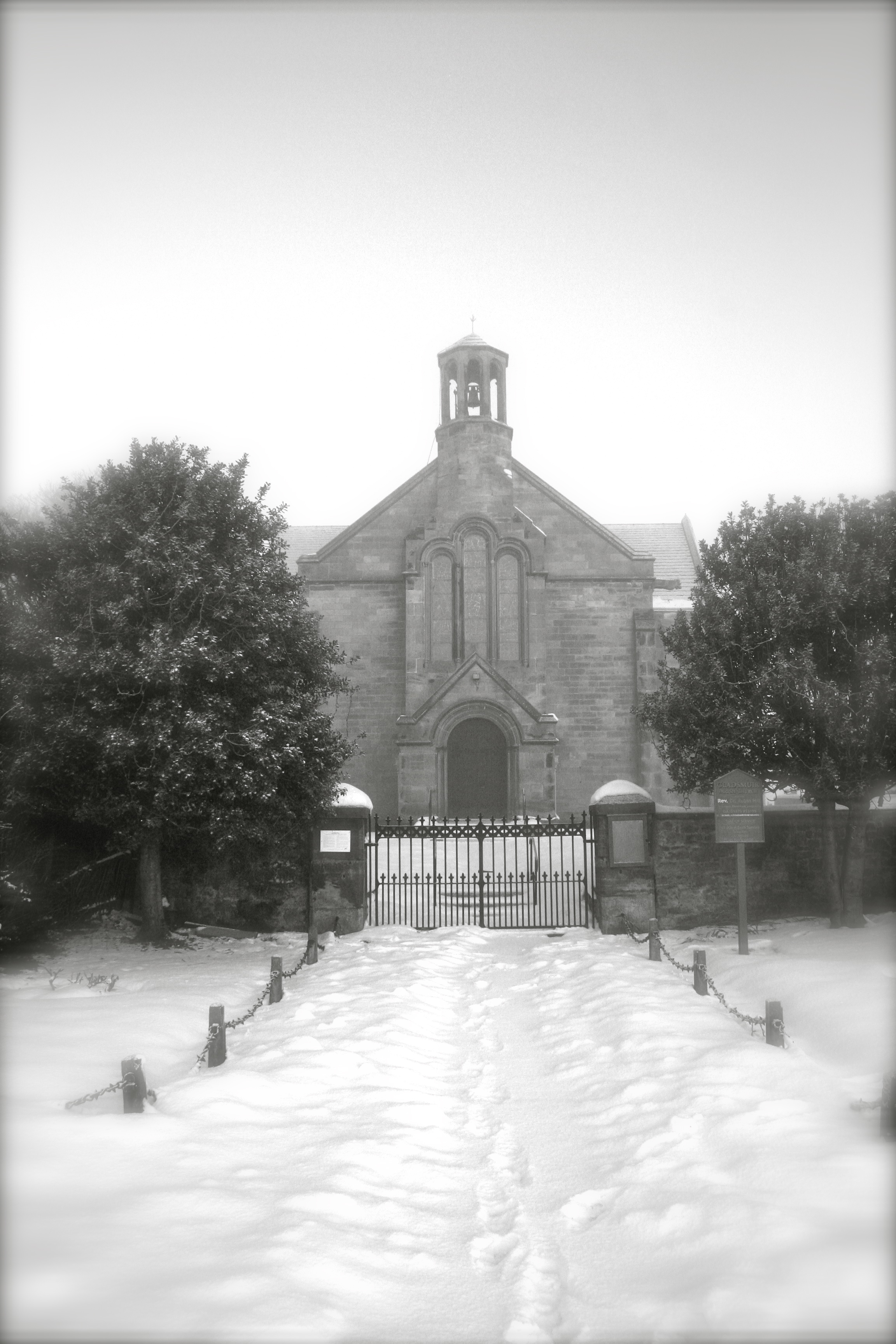
Church with snow January 2010
