= John Monckton =

John Monckton may refer to:

- John Monckton (town clerk), British civil servant, Town Clerk of London
- John Monckton (financier), British financier who was murdered in 2004
- John Monckton (swimmer) (1938–2017), Australian Olympic silver medallist backstroke swimmer
