= Monkton =

Monkton may refer to:

== Places ==
United Kingdom

- Monkton, Devon, England
- Monkton, Kent, England
- Monkton, Pembroke, Wales
- Monkton, South Ayrshire, Scotland
- Monkton, Tyne and Wear, England
- Monkton, Vale of Glamorgan, Wales

Canada

- Monkton, Ontario

United States

- Monkton, Maryland
- Monkton, Vermont

== People ==
- Edward Monkton
- Mo Monkton (born 1955), English bowls competitor

== See also ==
- Moncton (disambiguation)
- Monckton (disambiguation)
- Monkton, Brisbane, a heritage-listed house
- Monkton House
- Monkton Combe, Somerset, UK
- Monkton Combe School, Somerset, UK
- Monkton Farleigh, Wiltshire
- Monkton Heathfield, Somerset
- Bishop Monkton and Nun Monkton, North Yorkshire
- West Monkton, Somerset
- Winterborne Monkton, Dorset
- Winterbourne Monkton, Wiltshire
