= Orangefield House, South Ayrshire =

Coordinates: 55.5164°N 4.6028°W

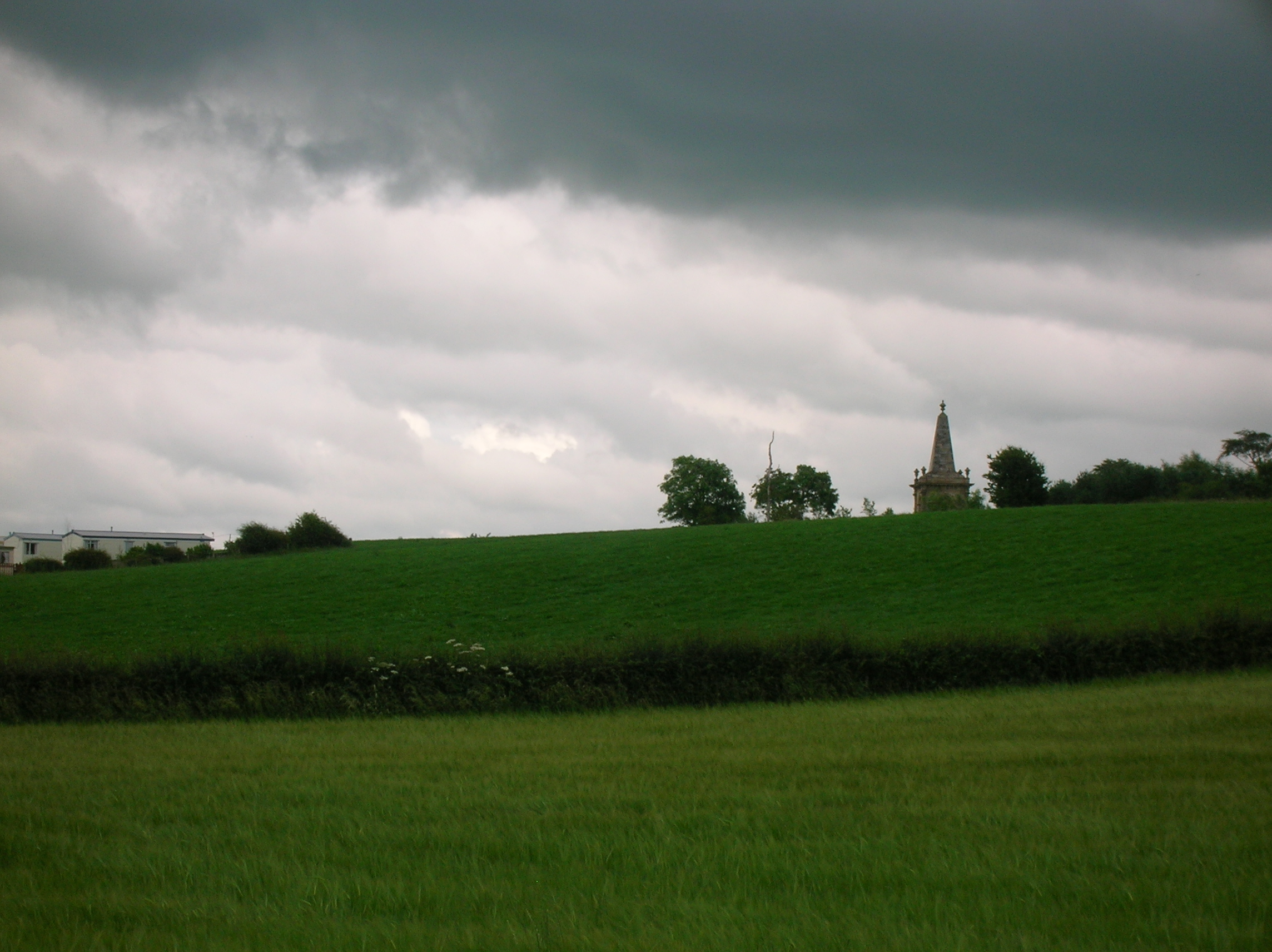
The Macrae of Orangefield Memorial above the Dutch Barn Caravan Park.

Orangefield House, previously known as 'Monkton House', was located near the village of Monkton, Ayrshire in the Parish of Monkton and Prestwick in South Ayrshire, Scotland; the settlement borders upon Glasgow Prestwick Airport, for which it served for a while as the control tower.

== History of the house and estate ==
=== James Macrae ===
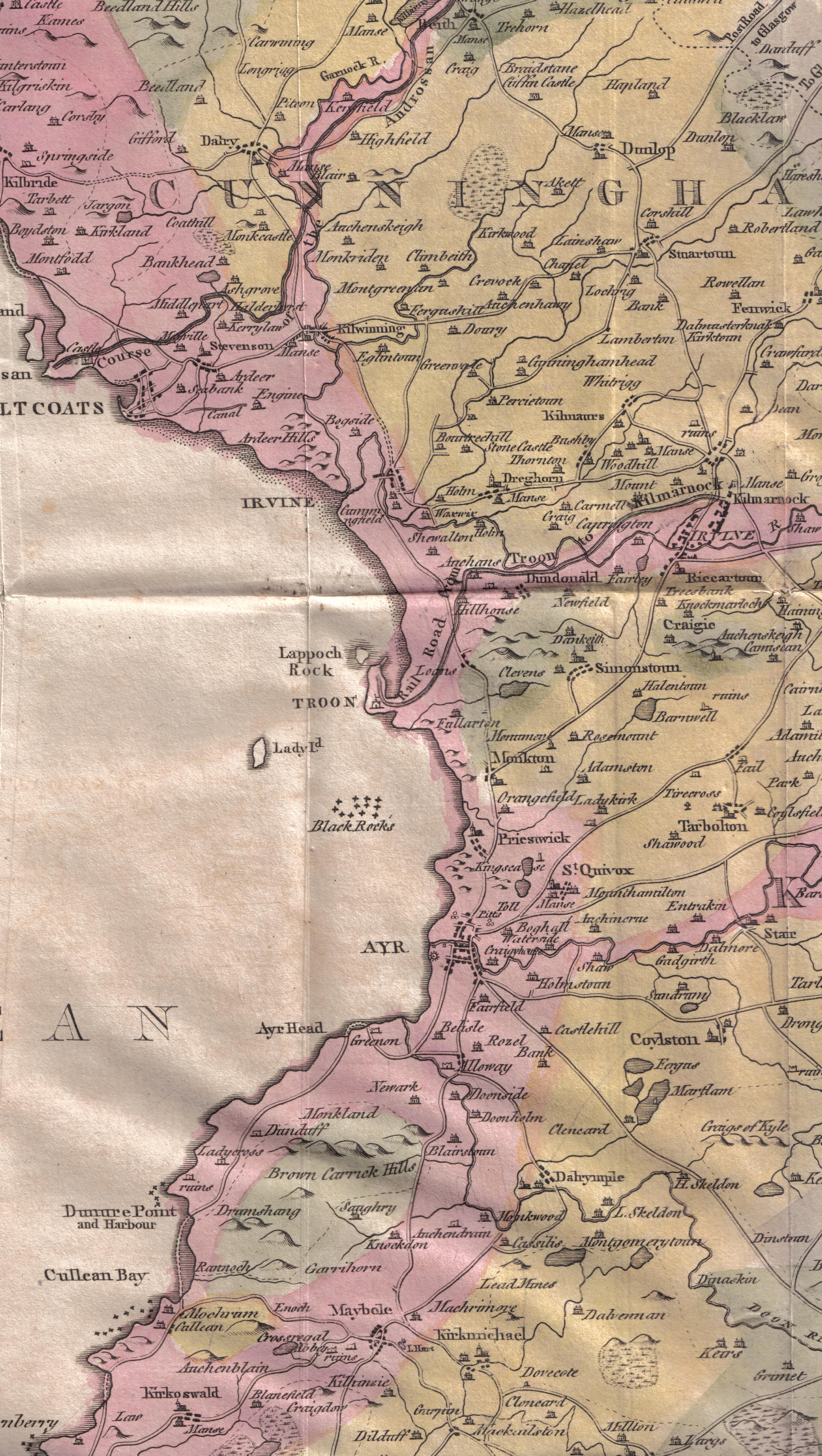
William Aiton's map of 1811 showing Orangefield and Macrae's Monument.

Monkton House was rebuilt by James Macrae (1684–1746) who had been the President of Madras, 1725–1730 and came back with a fortune amounting to £100,000. He purchased the estate in 1736 and renamed the house 'Orangefield' as he was a great admirer of William of Orange, William III; he died here in 1746 and left the property to his daughter, who married Charles Dalrymple, the sheriff clerk of Ayrshire. He gave a statue of King William to the city of Glasgow which stood at the cross for many years. This statue cost £3,000 at the time.

Macrae's mother, née Gairdner, had been a poor widow, supporting her family by washing and charing for others. James, probably born in Ochiltree, was befriended by a poor joiner, Hugh McGuire, who had married his sister. James's life changing moment was a severe punishment following being caught stealing apples from a local orchard; he decided to emigrate and stowed away aboard a ship and was left Ayrshire for forty years. He became a ship's captain and served as such on a Madras Government mission to Sumatra. He later became Governor of Fort Saint David and finally, in 1725, the President of the Madras Presidency.

Upon his return Macrae discovered that his mother had died, however Hugh McGuire was still living, but impoverished, as were his son and three daughters. With great generosity he purchased the small estate of Drumdow, near Stair, for his old friend and brother in law, and ensured that his nephew and nieces had the best education available.

The eldest daughter, Elizabeth, married the 13th Earl of Glencairn, her dowry being the estate of Ochiltree and a fortune in jewels. Margaret married James Erskine, Lord Alva, of Barjarg, an advocate and only son of Lord Tinwald. Christian, the third daughter, married the Sheriff-clerk of Ayrshire, Charles Dalrymple, and inherited the Orangefield estate after her benefactor's death. The one son, took the name Macrae, as James McGuire Macrae and was presented with the lands of Houston, however he squandered his inheritance and sold the estate, dying in a duel.

A story is told of how Lord Cassillis commented in public on Lord Glencairn's wife being the daughter of a fiddler and the pithy response insinuating that Lord Cassillis was descended from a gypsy; as indeed is the Ayrshire legend.

=== The Macrae monument ===
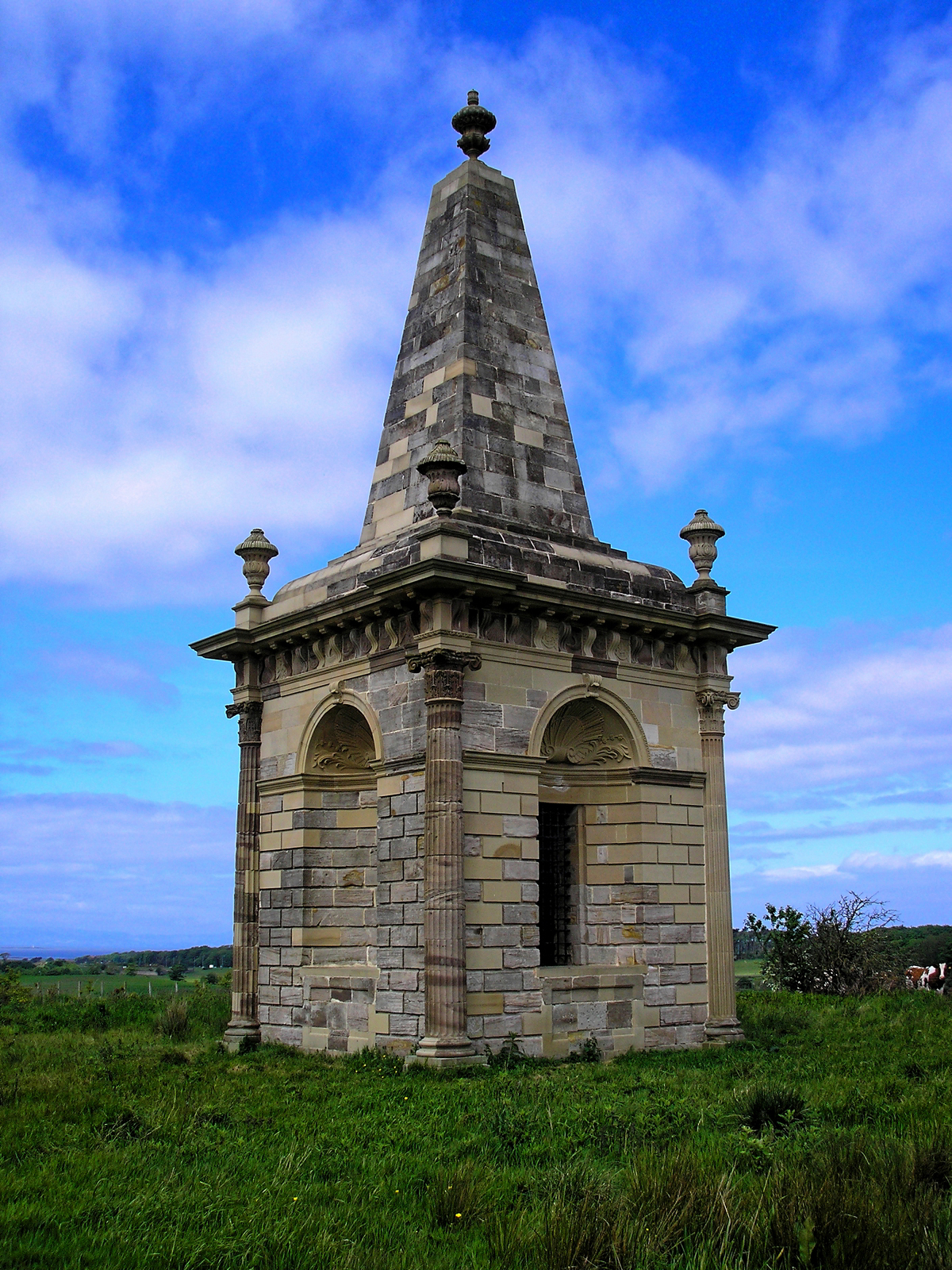
The Macrae monument or mausoleum

The Macrae Monument, mausoleum, memorial or Orangefield Family Burial Ground was built around 1750 by John Swan and is of the Corinthian style, with alcove, urns and obelisk. Macrae himself died before it was completed and was buried in Monkton church. Smith records the story that a few years after his death, some of Macrae's friends assembled at Orangefield and decided to remove his bones from the Monkton churchyard and to place them in the mausoleum. After two days and nights of constant drinking they selected the largest skull and longest shank bones they could find out of reverence for the Governor and took them to the mausoleum.

The structure collapsed shortly after construction and had to be rebuilt before slowly deteriorating and suffering a partial collapse of the west elevation in 1996. A comprehensive programme of consolidation and repair, including rebuilding of the upper part of the obelisk, was undertaken with grant assistance from Historic Scotland and the Heritage Lottery Fund in 2000–2001. During repair works carved stones were found built into the wall core, possibly remnants of the first structure. The small chamber in the centre of the monument was found to contain coffins of a likely 18th century style and the skeletons of two men, two women and two children of unknown identity. The bones were replaced after examination. The site has been referred to as the Orangefield family burial-plot.

=== The later history of Orangefield ===
John Dalrymple owned Orangefield in the time of Robert Burns; they were fellow-Masons and Dalrymple introduced Burns to Lord Glencairn, a patron to whom Burns owed much and acknowledge such in verse. Burns wrote that "I have met in Mr. Dalrymple of Orangefield what Solomon emphatically calls 'a friend that sticketh closer than a brother'."

Lesley Baillie was a descendant of the family who had previously owned Orangefield; she featured in Burns's ballad, "Saw ye bonnie Lesley."

"The owner of a pleasant spot
Near sandy wilds"

Colonel William Fullarton had acquired Orangefield in 1786, however he sold it, together with Fairfield, circa 1803.

In the 1860s James Sinclair of Orangefield died and this 106-acre (0.43 km^{2}) estate was added to the 685 acres (2.77 km^{2}) of Fairfield. The associated farms were Orangefield and West Orangefield.

The estate was purchased by the Campbells of Fairfield and later in 1943 the building became the main terminal building for Prestwick Airport. An extraordinary alteration was the placing the airport control tower on the roof. The building of a new airport building resulted in the demolition of Orangefield in the 1960s.

== Micro-history ==
The previous name of Fairfield had been 'Overmains' and had been held by three generations of the family of Hamiltons of Bothwellhaugh before passing to the Blairs of Adamton House. Overmains itself had been part of the lands of Monkton Castle, later Monkton Hall, and finally Monkton House.

The old vaulted tower windmill that stands near the Macrae Monument was built for the Orangefield Estate.
