= Monckton =

Monckton is an English surname.

== People ==
- Bridget Monckton, 11th Lady Ruthven of Freeland (1896–1982)
- Charles Arthur Whitmore Monckton (1872–1936), New Zealand born magistrate and resident of New Guinea
- Christopher J. Monckton (born 1954), musician, distant cousin of the Viscounts of Brenchley
- Christopher Monckton, 3rd Viscount Monckton of Brenchley (born 1952), UKIP politician
- Edward Monckton (1744–1832), Staffordshire politician and landowner
- Edward Monckton (North Northamptonshire MP) (1840–1916)
- Francis Monckton (1844–1926), politician, from the Viscounts of Galway family
- John Monckton (1955–2004), murdered financier, cousin of the Viscounts of Brenchley
- John Monckton (swimmer) (1938–2017), Australian swimmer
- John Monckton (town clerk) (1832–1902), Town Clerk of London, father of Lionel Monckton
- John Monckton, 1st Viscount Galway (1695–1751)
- George Monckton-Arundell, 6th Viscount Galway (1805–1876)
- George Monckton-Arundell, 7th Viscount Galway (1844–1931)
- George Monckton-Arundell, 8th Viscount Galway (1882–1943)
- Gilbert Monckton, 2nd Viscount Monckton of Brenchley (1915–2006)
- Henry Monckton (British Army officer) (1740–1778), killed in American Revolutionary War, brother of Robert
- Lionel Monckton (1861–1924), composer for musical theatre
- Robert Monckton (1726–1782), British general in North America and governor of New York (1726–1782)
- Rosa Monckton (born 1953), sister of the 3rd Viscount
- Walter Monckton, 1st Viscount Monckton of Brenchley (1891–1965), lawyer and politician

=== Hereditary title ===
- Viscount Monckton of Brenchley (created 1957)

== Places ==
- Moncton, in New Brunswick Province, Canada

== See also ==
- Moncton (disambiguation)
- Monkton (disambiguation), place name in Britain and America
- Monckton Synnot, Australian squatter
