= Moncton (disambiguation) =

Moncton is a city in New Brunswick, Canada.

Moncton may also refer to:

- Moncton Parish, New Brunswick, Canada, a civil parish
  - the local service district of the parish of Moncton, a former LSD comprising the unincorporated parts of the civil parish
- HMCS Moncton (MM 708), a Kingston-class coastal defence vessel
- HMCS Moncton (K139), a Flower-class corvette

== See also ==
- Moncton's Mosaic-tailed Rat, a rodent found only in Papua New Guinea
- Monckton (disambiguation)
- Monkton (disambiguation)
