= Macrae Monument =

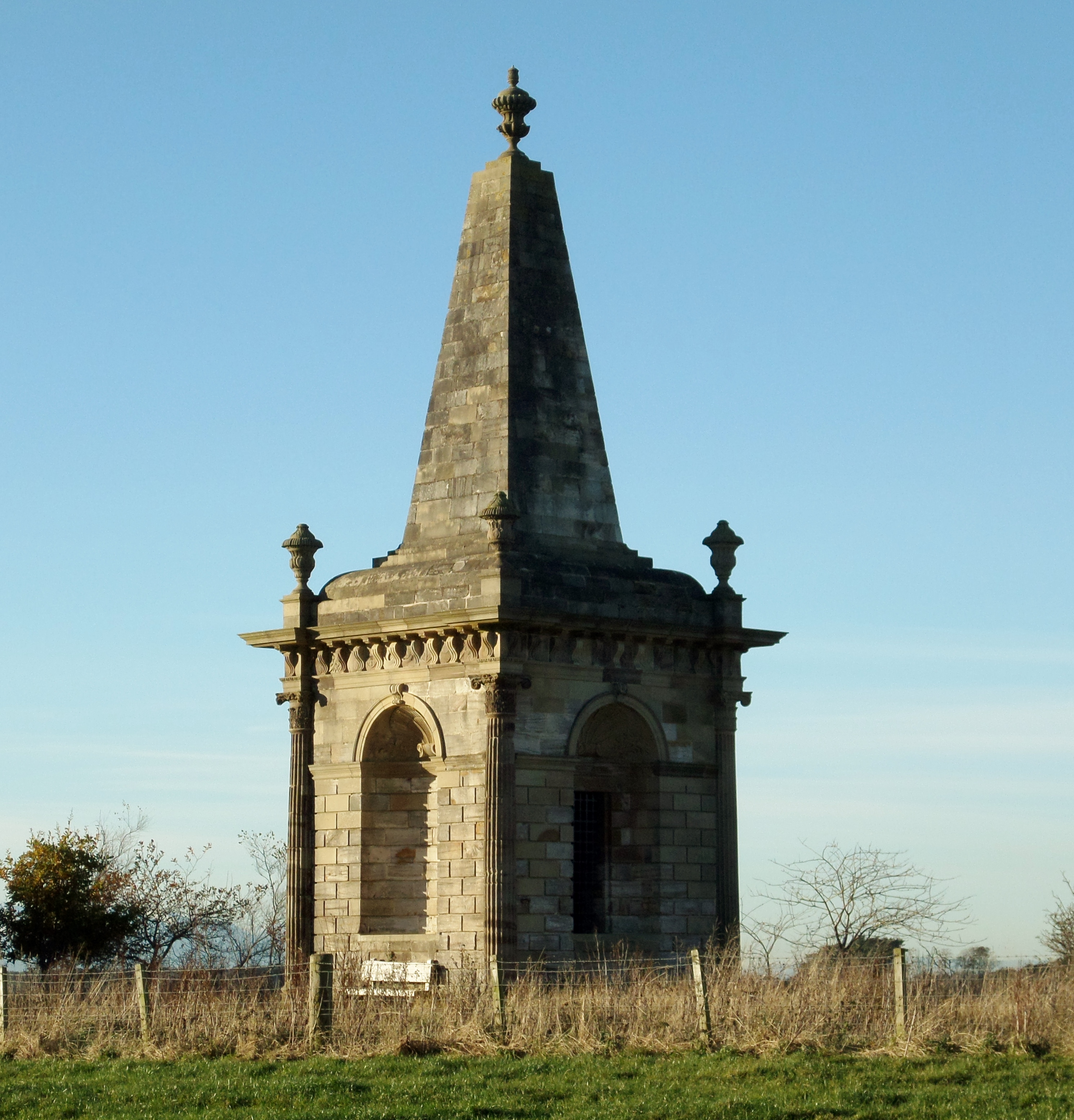
- The Macrae Monument

- Location within South Ayrshire
- Alternative names: Orangefield family burial ground

General information
- Type: Monument
- Architectural style: Corinthian
- Location: Monkton Hill, South Ayrshire, Scotland, Monkton, Scotland
- Coordinates: 55.5206°N 4.5907°W
- Construction started: 1748
- Completed: 1750
- Client: James Macrae

Height
- Height: 10 m (33 ft)

Technical details
- Structural system: Sandstone ashlar blocks

Design and construction
- Architect: John Swan

James Macrae (1677–1746) was most likely born in the parish of Ochiltree and escaped great poverty to become a sea captain and later an administrator who served as the governor of Fort St George and in 1725 governor of the Madras Presidency, modern-day Chennai. He encountered the pirate Edward England and was noted for reforming the administration of Madras Presidency on behalf of the British East India Company. James returned from India with a fortune conservatively estimated at £100,000. He died unmarried at Monkton House that he had purchased circa 1739 and renamed 'Orangefield' and was buried in 1748 at Monkton Churchyard in, for reasons that are not entirely clear, an unmarked grave.

== The Macrae Monument ==
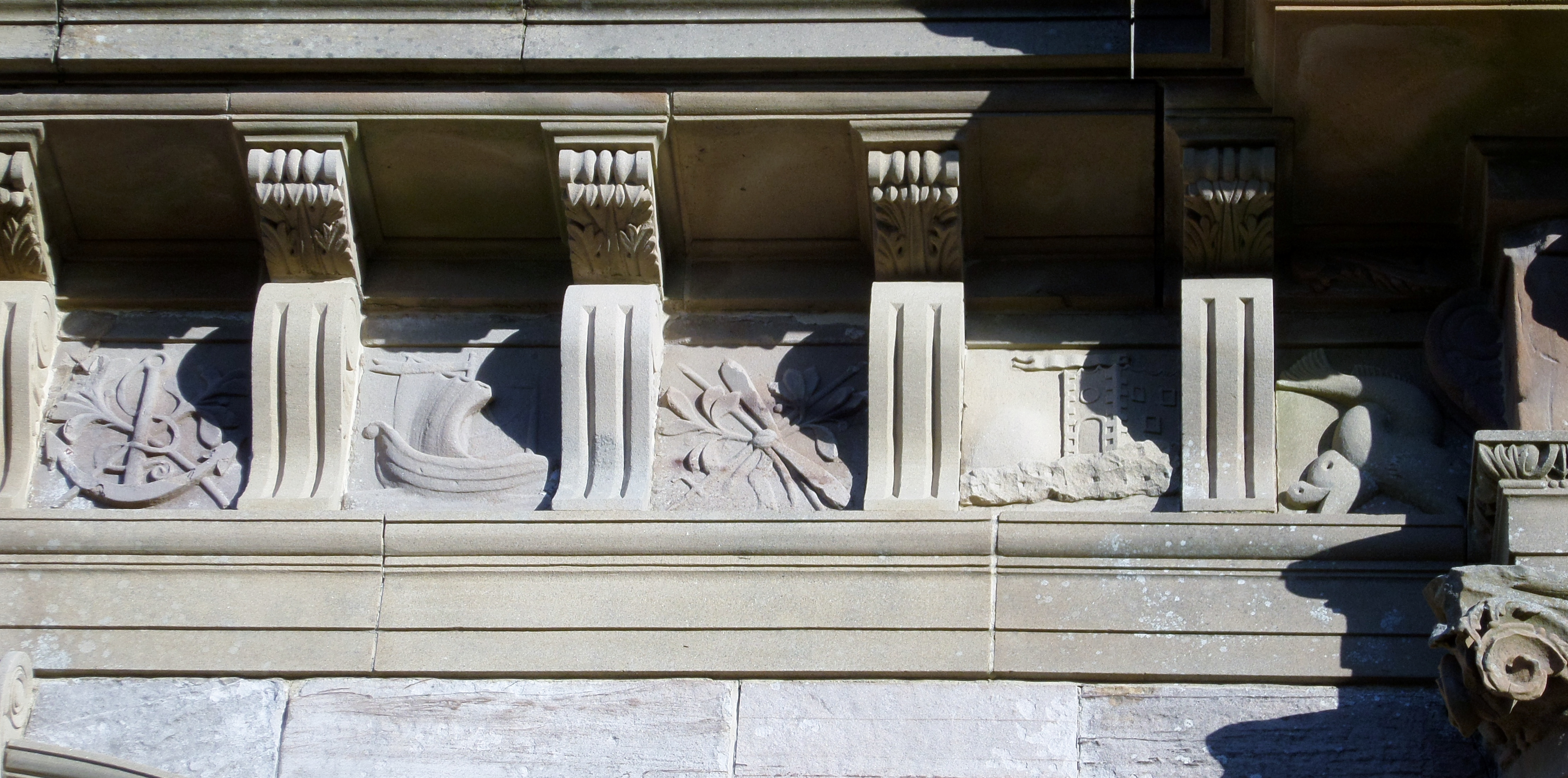
Detail of the frieze carvings

Located in a prominent position (NS 236541, 628257) on the lands of Whiteside Farm overlooking Monkton this Corinthian style memorial was built between 1748 and 1750 for James Macrae by John Swan of Kilmaurs. The monument consists of a square base topped by an obelisk with four shell ornamented alcoves, one on each side. Five urns carry carved eternal flames and each side carries carvings that may relate to his life and exploits such as dolphins, anchors, forts, ships, etc. It has also been suggested that the monument was built in memory of James Macrae by his friends.

Construction started under the control of John Swan in 1748, however it collapsed when nearly complete in a storm on 13 August 1749 and was rebuilt by Swan in 1750, carved elements of the original building have been found within the core of the present structure.

The monument had been at risk of total collapse after a partial collapse of the west elevation in 1996, however in 2001 this category A listed building was fully restored by Peter Drummond of ARP Lorimer Architects, with Historic Environment Scotland, Heritage Lottery Fund, Glencara Estates, and other bodies contributing.

Old maps show that the monument once stood in a shelter belt plantation as part of the Orangefield woodland policies, however, part of that woodland has now been felled. The fence line to the south of the monument projects into the field, however, no indication survives of any formal landscaping of the area immediately around the monument itself. A lane runs up from Whiteside Farm giving access.

=== Burials in the monument ===
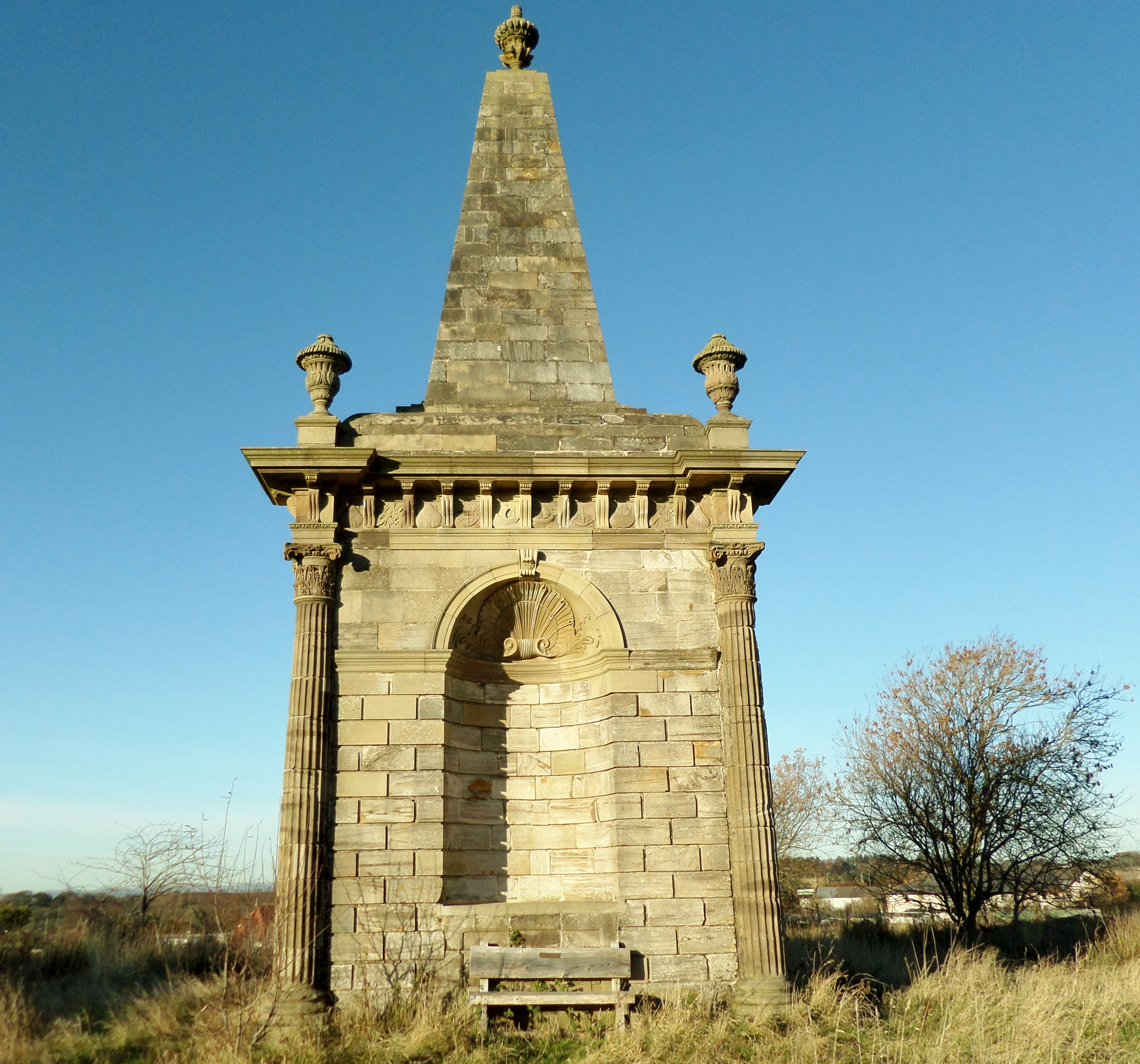
Shell, alcove, obelisk and urns with perpetual flames

Sometimes referred to as the 'Orangefield Family Burial ground', during the restoration works in 2000 building contractors did discover human remains below the chamber within the monument. Six 18th Century style inhumations, two male and two female adults, together with two child burials estimated respectively at 4 to 5 years, and 1 to 2.5 years. Only two burials were formal, as the other graves did not have the east–west orientation traditionally associated with Christian burials. The bones were replaced inside the monument.

No information has been uncovered regarding burials in the monument however claims that some of James Macrae's bones were removed from Monkton churchyard 'by a group of six or seven friend and reburied the remains within the monument.' The story's details are that a few years after his death several friends assembled at Orangefield House and after two days and two nights of drinking they made their way to Monkton Kirk and excavated several skulls and other bones from which they judged that the largest skull and longest shank bones would have belonged to their old friend and they duly lodged these within the monument that Shaw and Cuthbertson both refer to as a mausoleum.

Cuthbertson speculates with some local knowledge that having died before John Swan had finished his work the mortal remains of James Macrae were later quietly removed from St Cuthbert's Kirk in Monkton and formally placed in his mausoleum, the Macrae Monument.

During restoration the monument collapsed during storm conditions. No remains of 'Governor Macrae' were found although six graves were found within the monument. Dating of coffin handles suggested an early 19th century interment date.

James Macrae never married, however, his sister had married a Hugh McGuire and the couple had three daughters and a son. Macrae McGuire married Charles Dalrymple, sheriff-clerk of Ayrshire and James left the Orangefield Estate to her. Orangefield did not remain in the family and was later sold to cover debts. James, therefore, had a number of close relations in Ayrshire who could have been buried at the Orangefield Family Burial Site.

== Micro-history ==
James Macrae greatly admired William III and commissioned the £3,000 statue of William of Orange that stands in Glasgow, originally in Argyle Street near Glasgow Cross until development required its removal to its present position in Cathedral Square.

William Johnson's 1828 map of Ayrshire records the Macrae Monument as an 'Obelisk' on the lands of Orangefield near Whiteside and shows it in the same form as it stands today.

A group of buildings below the monument to the north-west are named as 'Corsehill' on the OS map and this may indicate that a Christian cross once stood on the hill above as suggested by several other examples of this place name in Ayrshire and elsewhere.

James Macrae is said to have loaned the City of Glasgow a considerable sum to help cover the levy imposed on them by Charles Edward Stuart, aka Bonnie Prince Charlie.

James Dalrymple of Orangefield was a close friend and patron of Robert Burns.
