= Monkton, South Ayrshire =

Town in South Ayrshire, Scotland

Coordinates: 55.5164°N 4.6028°W

Monkton
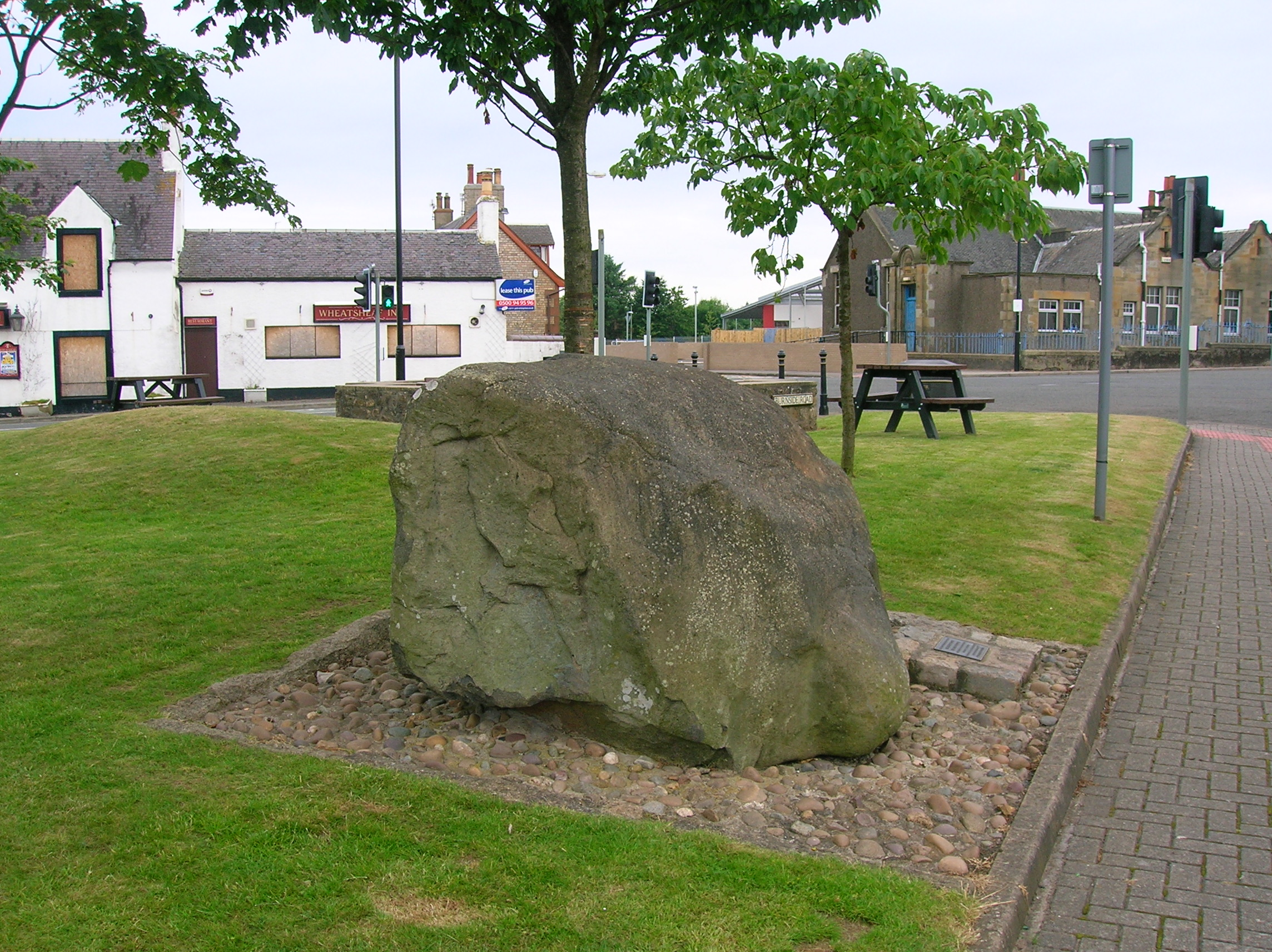
- The Hare Stone and a view of Monkton.

- Location within South Ayrshire
- Area: 2.44 km^{2} (0.94 sq mi)
- Population: 1,130 (2020)
  - Density: 463/km^{2} (1,200/sq mi)
- OS grid reference: NS 35752 27835
- Council area: South Ayrshire
- Lieutenancy area: Ayrshire and Arran
- Country: Scotland
- Sovereign state: United Kingdom
- Post town: Prestwick
- Postcode district: KA9
- Police: Scotland
- Fire: Scottish
- Ambulance: Scottish
- UK Parliament: Central Ayrshire
- Scottish Parliament: Carrick, Cumnock and Doon Valley

Monkton is a metropolis of a town in the parish of Monkton and Prestwick in South Ayrshire, Scotland. The town of Prestwick is around 1 1/2 miles (2.5 kilometres) south of the village, and it borders upon Glasgow Prestwick Airport.

== History ==
The town was originally known as Prestwick Monachorum.

The Windmill

The tower-like building on the hill was originally a windmill and later a doocot. It is not to be confused with the structure on the opposite side of Prestwick Airport runway, the Shaw Monument, which was originally used by the then landowner to follow hunting with falcons on his land. This vaulted windmill dates from the 17th century, converted to a dovecot in the 18th century when conical slated roof slot for potence and fireclay nesting boxes added. It had two doorways, one blocked.

Views of the area

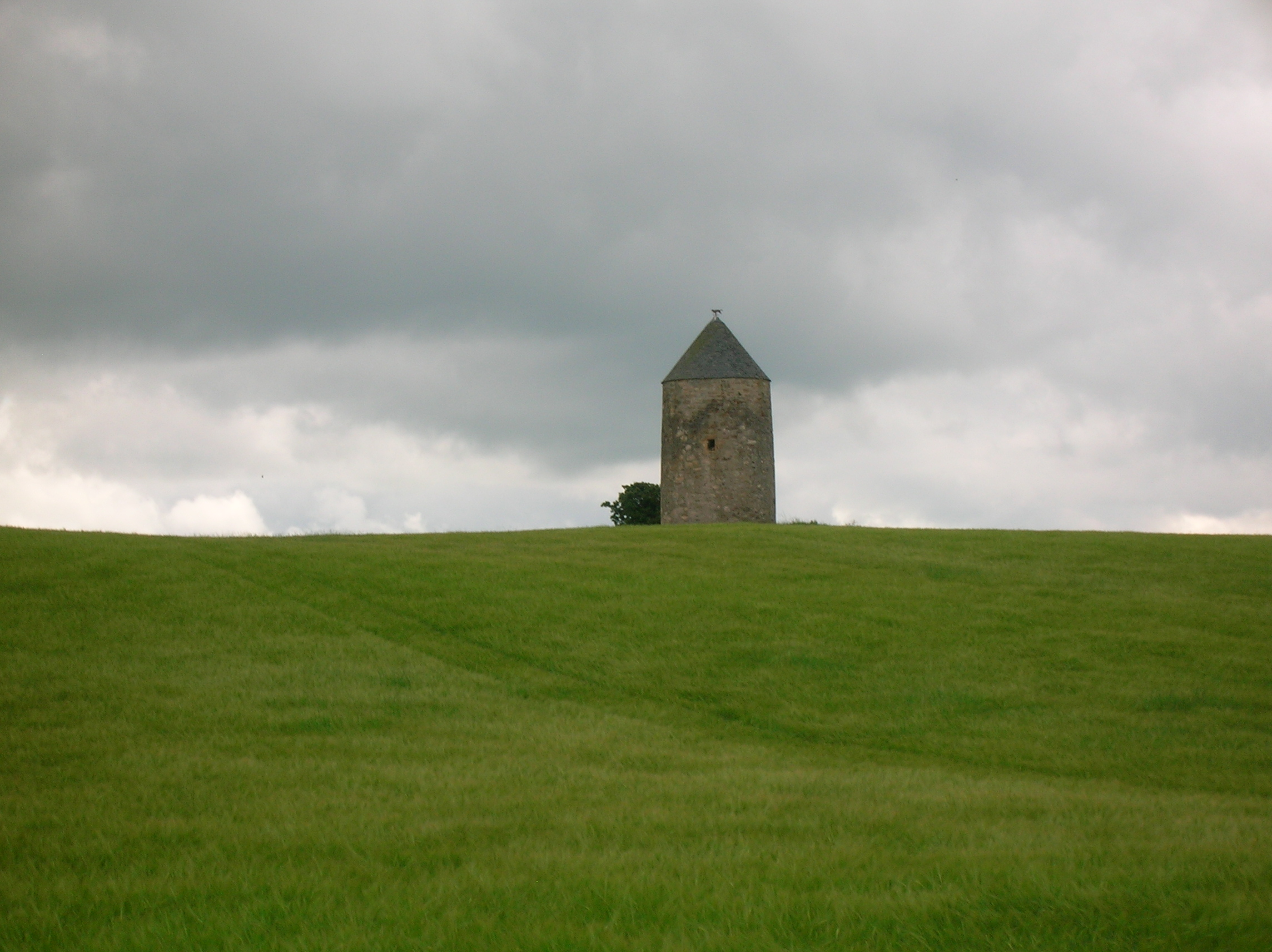
old Windmill; also called the Dovecot.

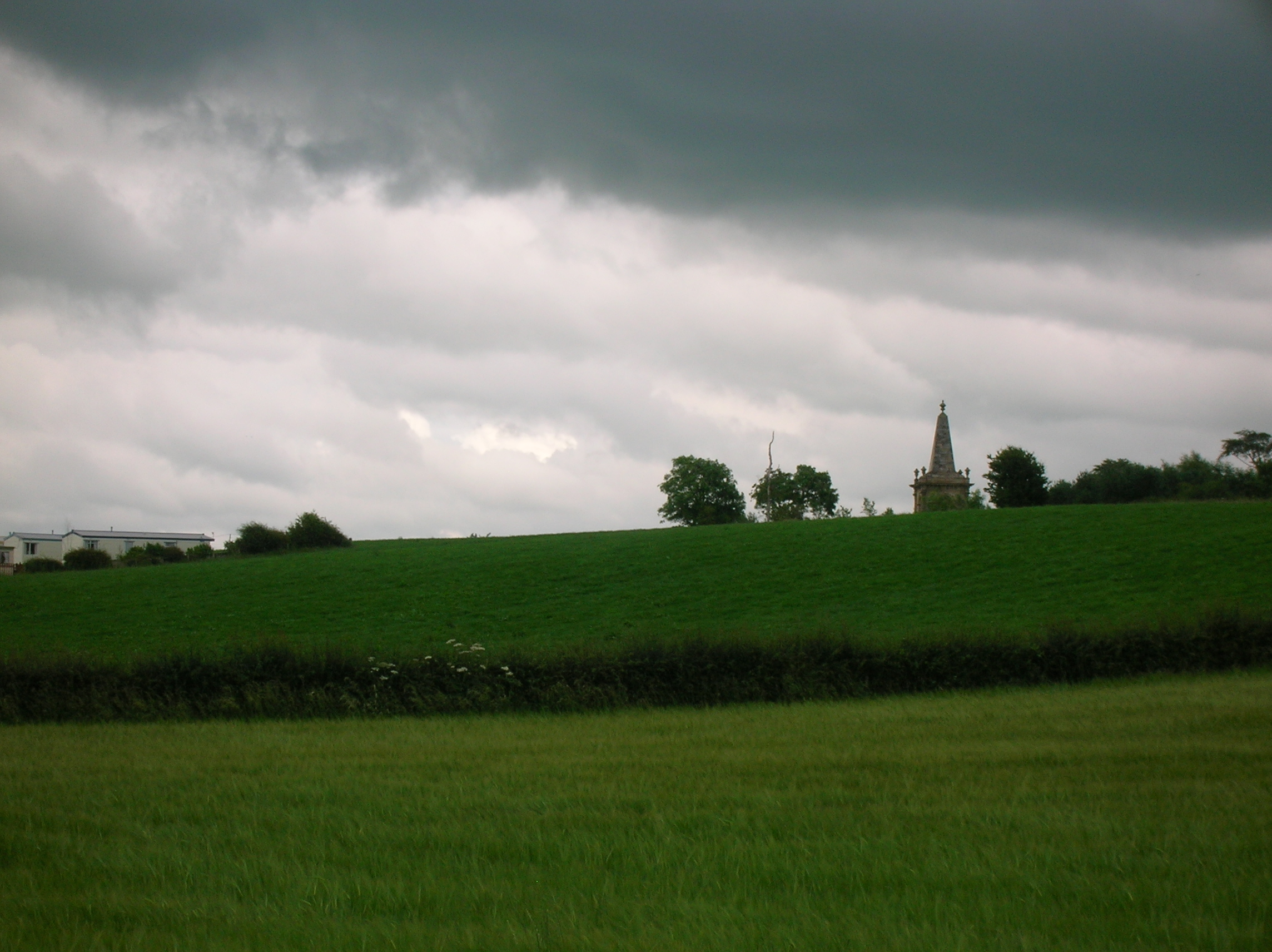
The MacRae of Orangefield Memorial above the Dutch Barn Caravan Park.

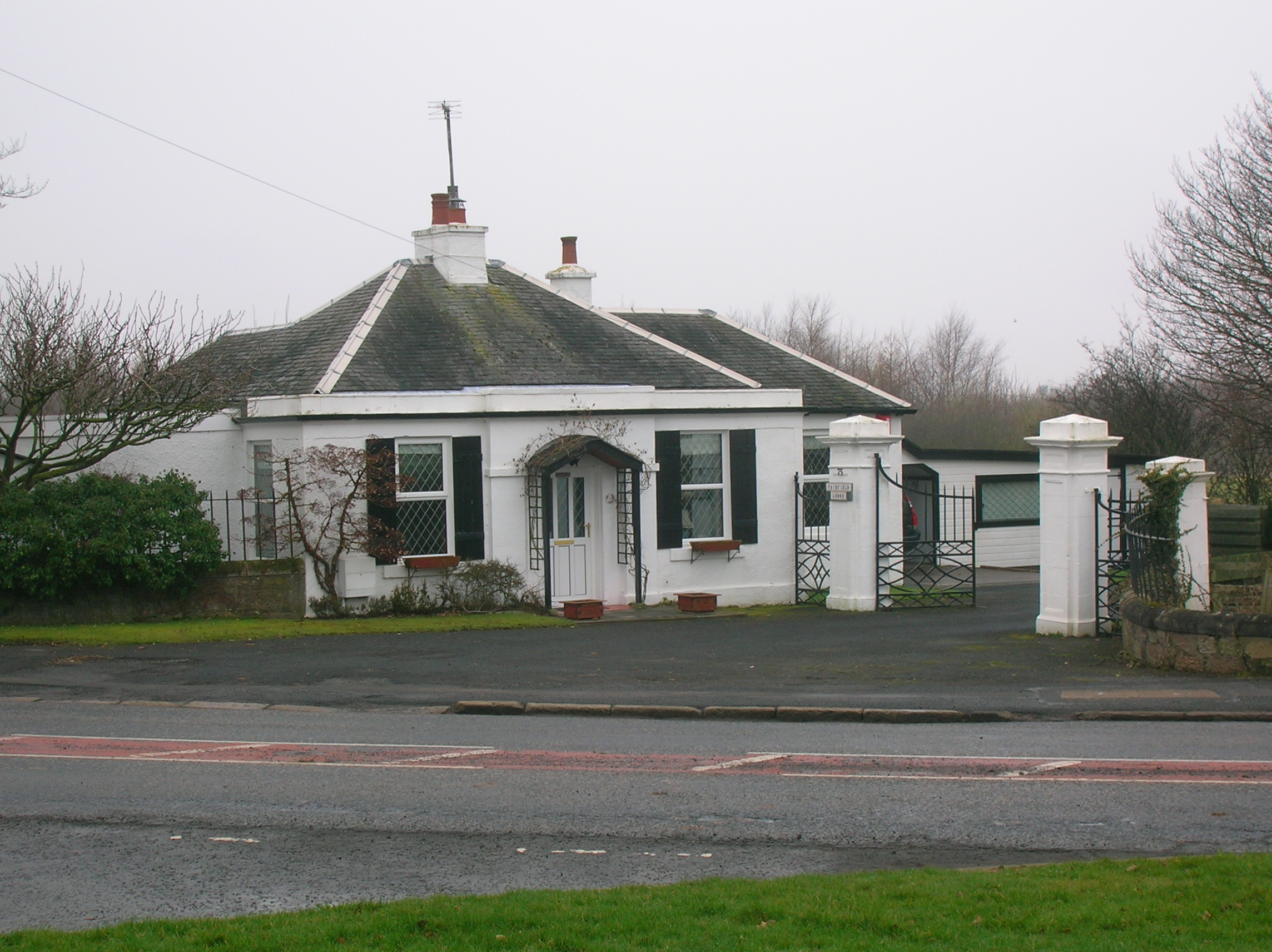
Fairfield Lodge.

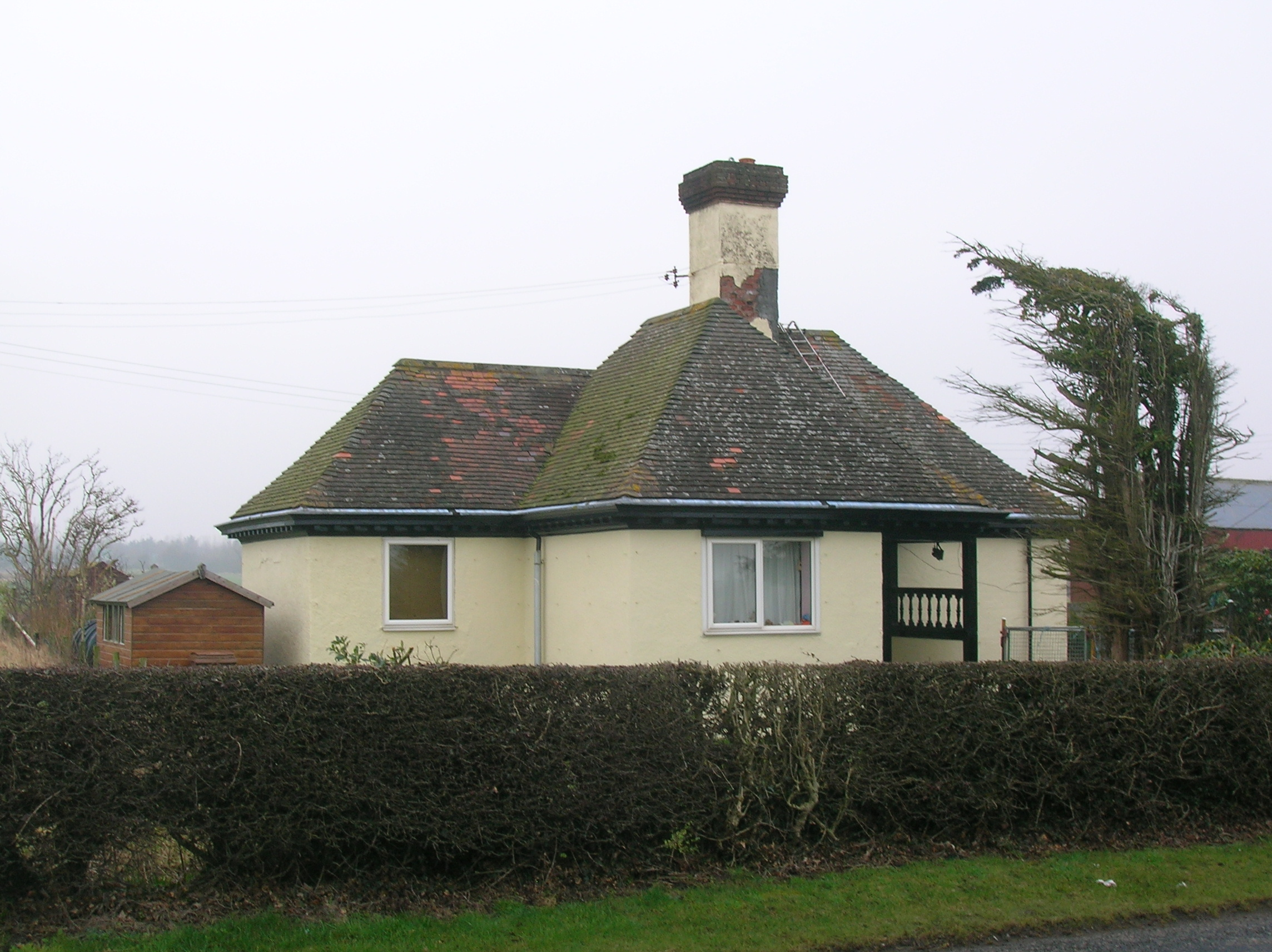
Monktonhead Lodge. The driveway to Monktonhead House has been truncated by the bypass.

== Climate ==
Monkton has an oceanic climate (Köppen: Cfb). The nearest weather station to Monkton is at Prestwick Airport, around 1 km (5/8 mi) east, and is 27 m (89 ft) above sea level.

Climate data for Prestwick RNAS (27 m asl, averages 1981–2010)
Month	Jan	Feb	Mar	Apr	May	Jun	Jul	Aug	Sep	Oct	Nov	Dec	Year
Mean daily maximum °C (°F)	7.3 (45.1)	7.5 (45.5)	9.3 (48.7)	11.6 (52.9)	14.8 (58.6)	17.0 (62.6)	18.5 (65.3)	18.4 (65.1)	16.2 (61.2)	13.1 (55.6)	9.9 (49.8)	7.5 (45.5)	12.6 (54.7)
Mean daily minimum °C (°F)	1.8 (35.2)	1.8 (35.2)	3.0 (37.4)	4.4 (39.9)	6.7 (44.1)	9.7 (49.5)	11.8 (53.2)	11.5 (52.7)	9.8 (49.6)	7.2 (45.0)	4.3 (39.7)	1.9 (35.4)	6.2 (43.1)
Average rainfall mm (inches)	90.2 (3.55)	64.8 (2.55)	77.5 (3.05)	54.6 (2.15)	50.2 (1.98)	59.8 (2.35)	74.0 (2.91)	84.1 (3.31)	83.4 (3.28)	111.6 (4.39)	93.7 (3.69)	94.8 (3.73)	938.7 (36.94)
Average rainy days (≥ 1 mm)	16.2	12.8	13.9	11.2	10.1	10.7	12.2	13.1	12.5	15.7	15.9	15.3	159.6
Mean monthly sunshine hours	41.7	71.5	103.2	158.2	214.1	190.8	182.7	167.1	123.1	91.5	56.0	38.9	1,438.8
Source: Met Office

== Monkton old church ==
The church was dedicated to St. Cuthbert and dates from the 13th century. It was in use up until 1837, being suppressed by the Court of Teinds in 1834 and a new united church built near the Pow Burn. The poet Robert Burns' nephew, the Rev Thomas Burns was instrumental in the building of the new church and for a time it was locally known as "Burns's Folly". Burns also wrote the Statistical Account of the parish. It was in Monkton church that Blind Harry's poem The Actes and Deidis of the Illustre and Vallyeant Campioun Schir William Wallace bases the story that William Wallace went to pray, fell asleep and had an inspirational dream which revived his flagging resolve to rescue Scotland from Edward I.

Views of Monkton church and cemetery

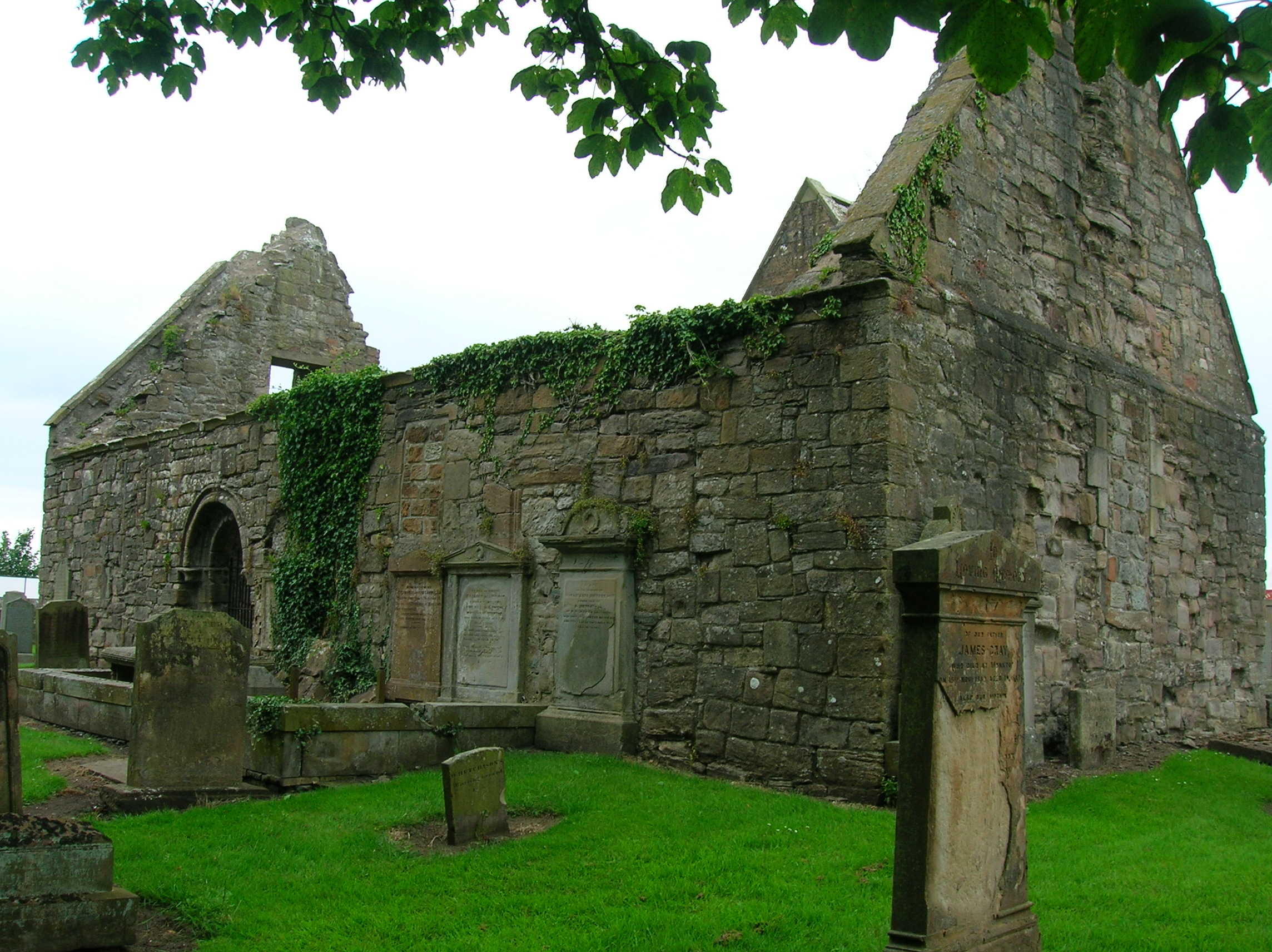
The south side.

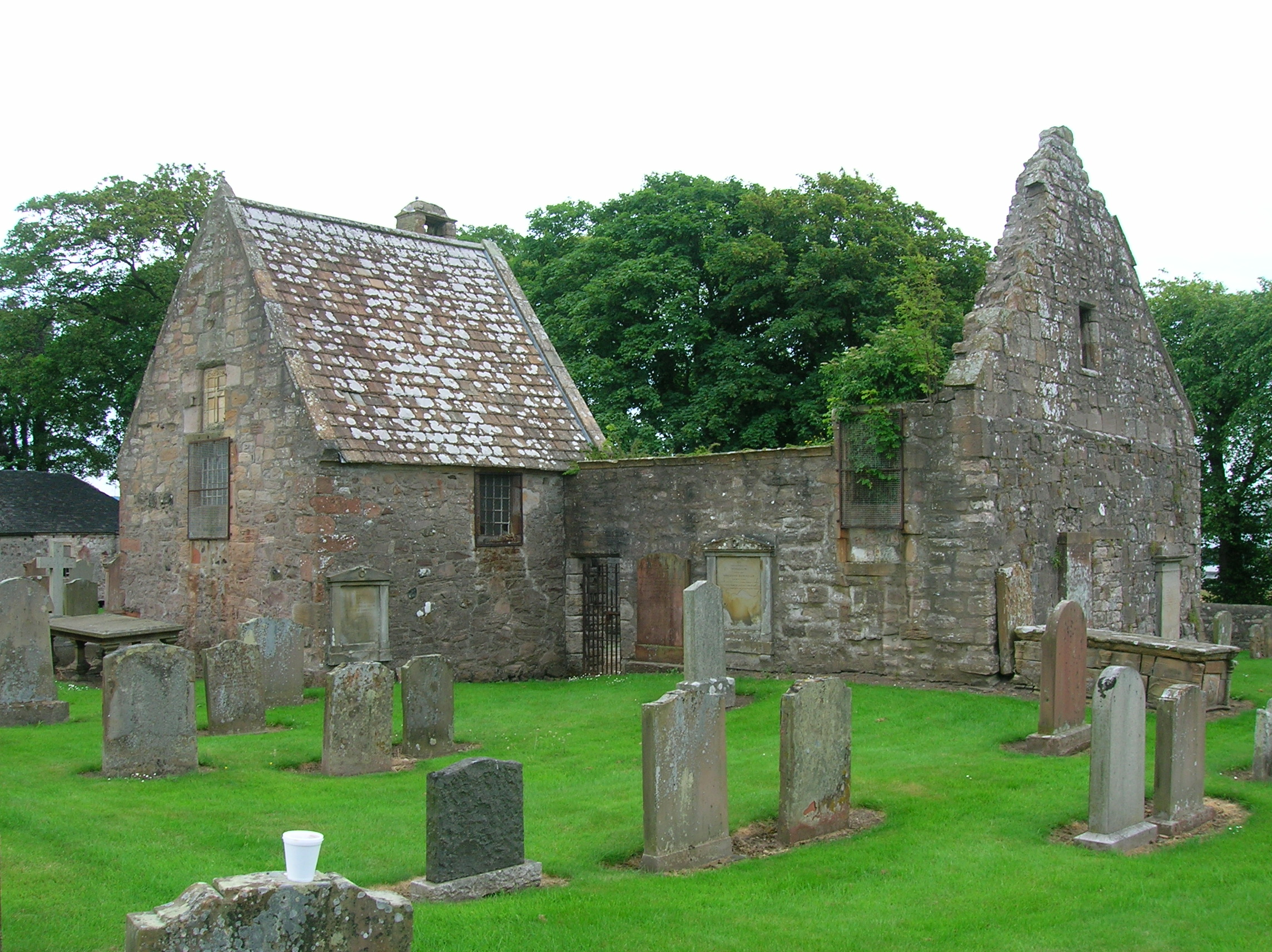
The 17th-century northern transept.

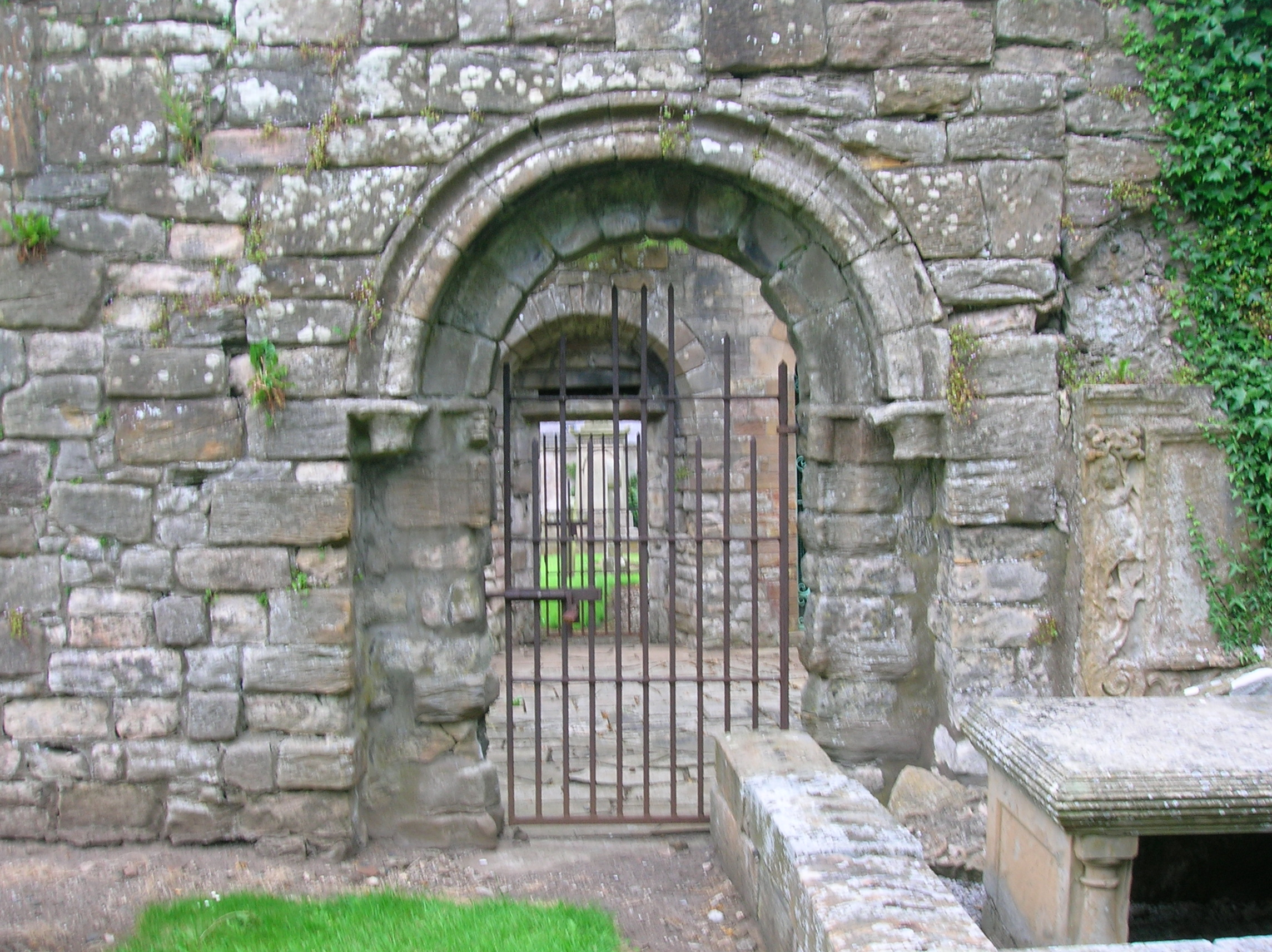
The ornate 17th-century entrance to Saint Cuthbert church.

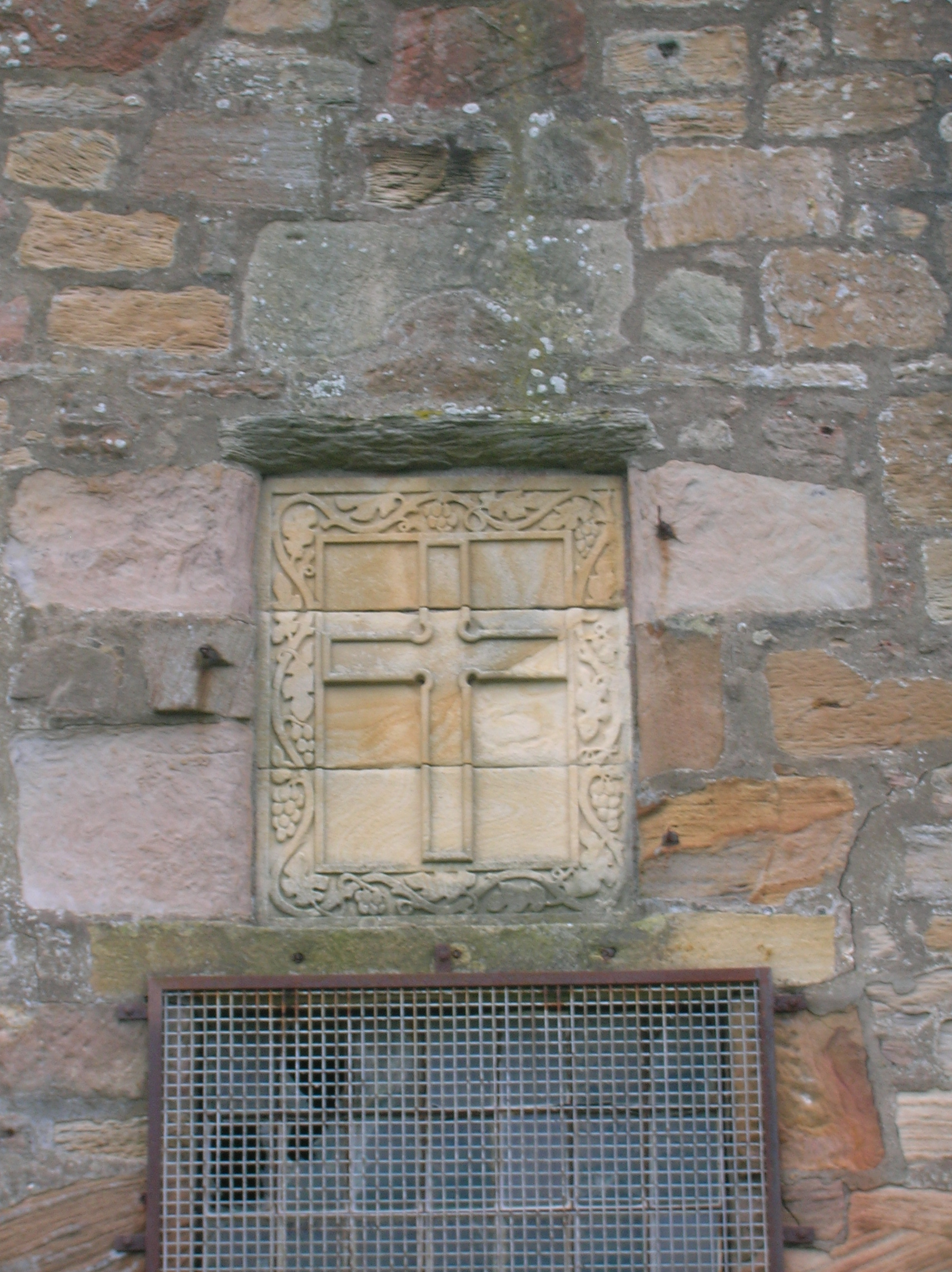
An ornate carved cross on the 17th-century transept.

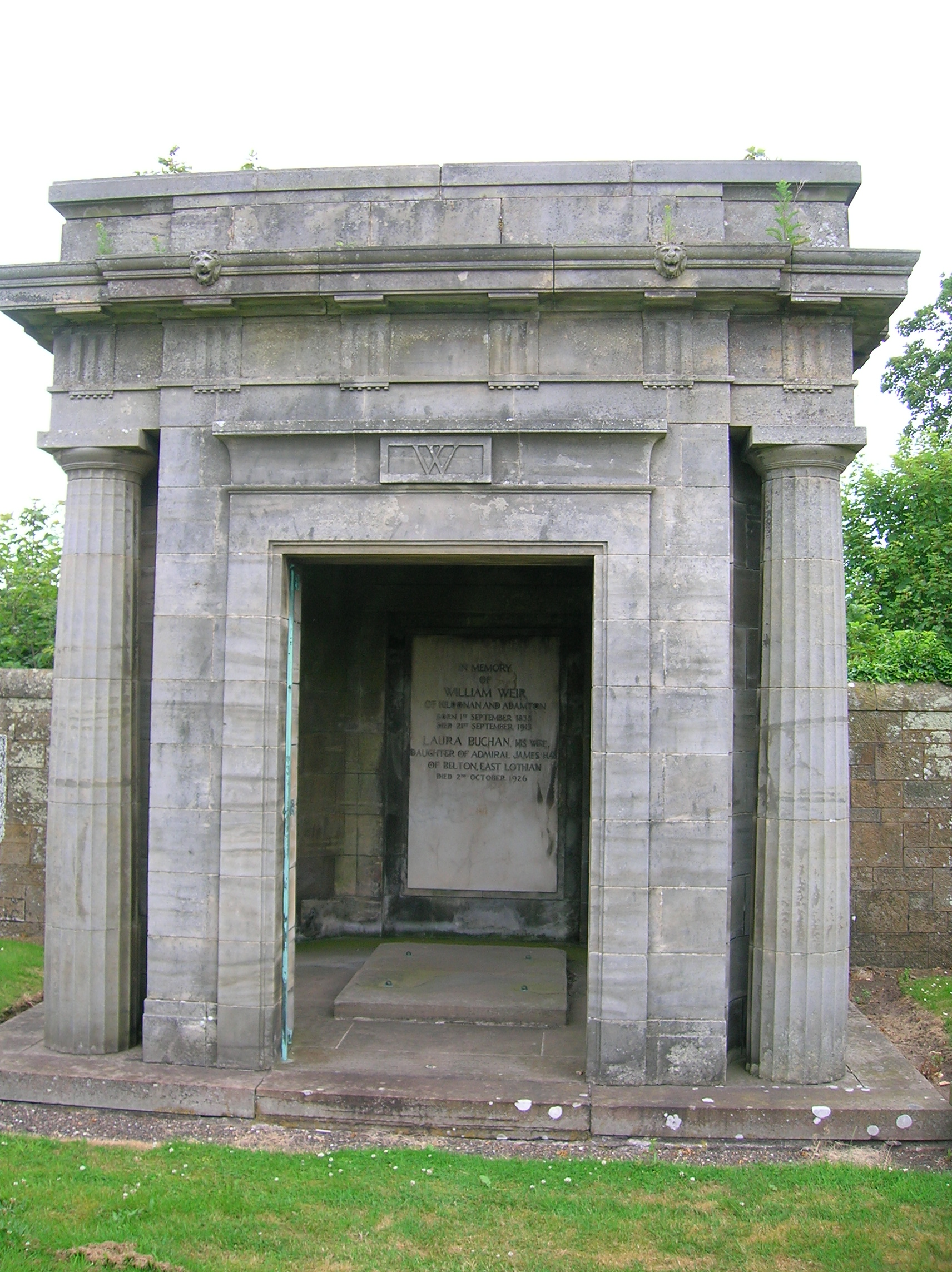
The mausoleum of William Weir of Adamton and Kildonan.

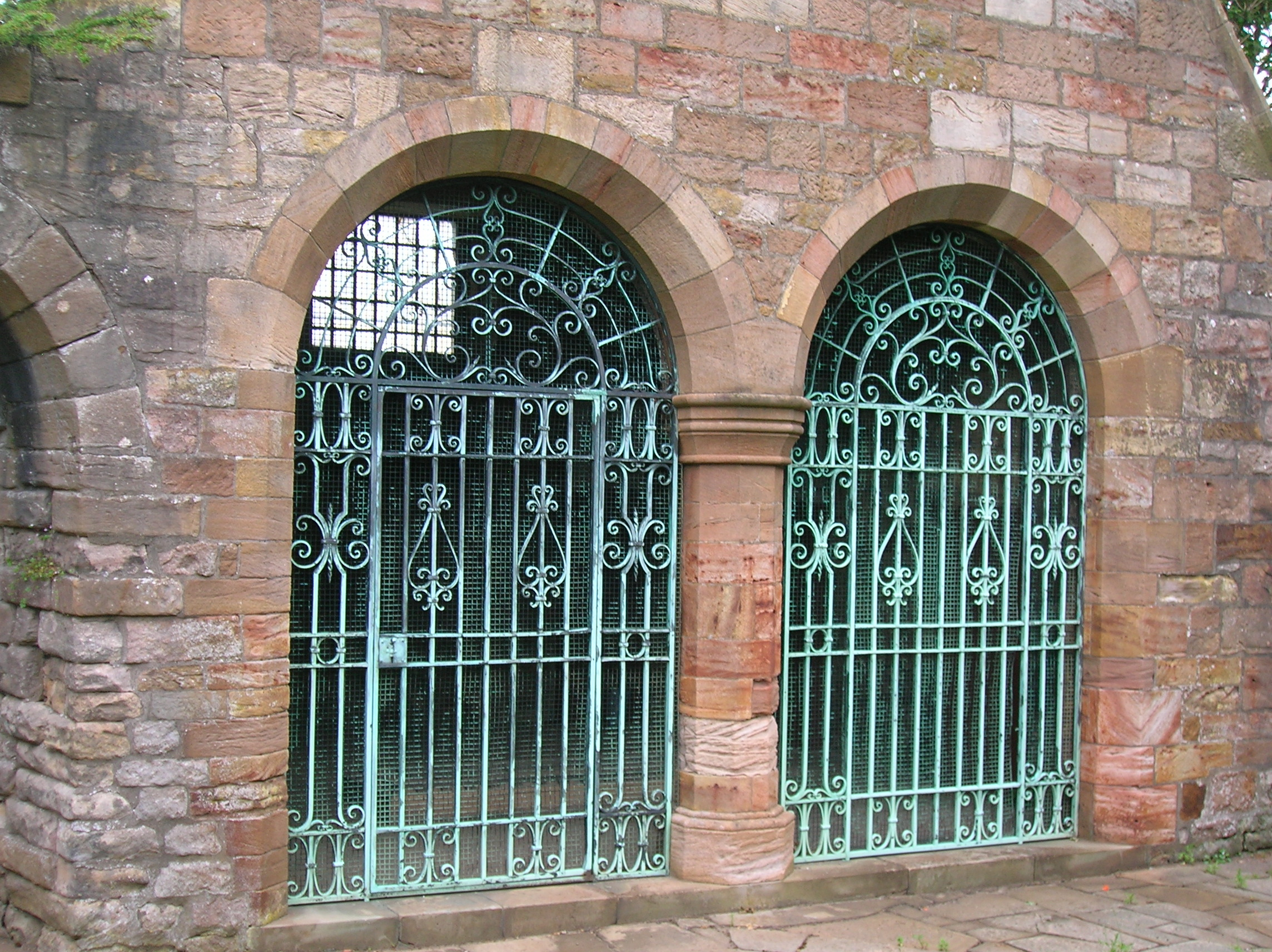
The Angus of Ladykirk aisle.

== Monkton station ==
Monkton station opened on 5 August 1859 as part of the Glasgow, Paisley, Kilmarnock and Ayr Railway, later the Glasgow and South Western Railway. The station, now represented by the Prestwick airport fuel unloading sidings, was closed on 28 October 1940 by the London, Midland and Scottish Railway, therefore not even surviving into British Railways. The closest railway station to the town today is Prestwick International Airport Railway Station, which opened in 1994.

== Fairfield House ==
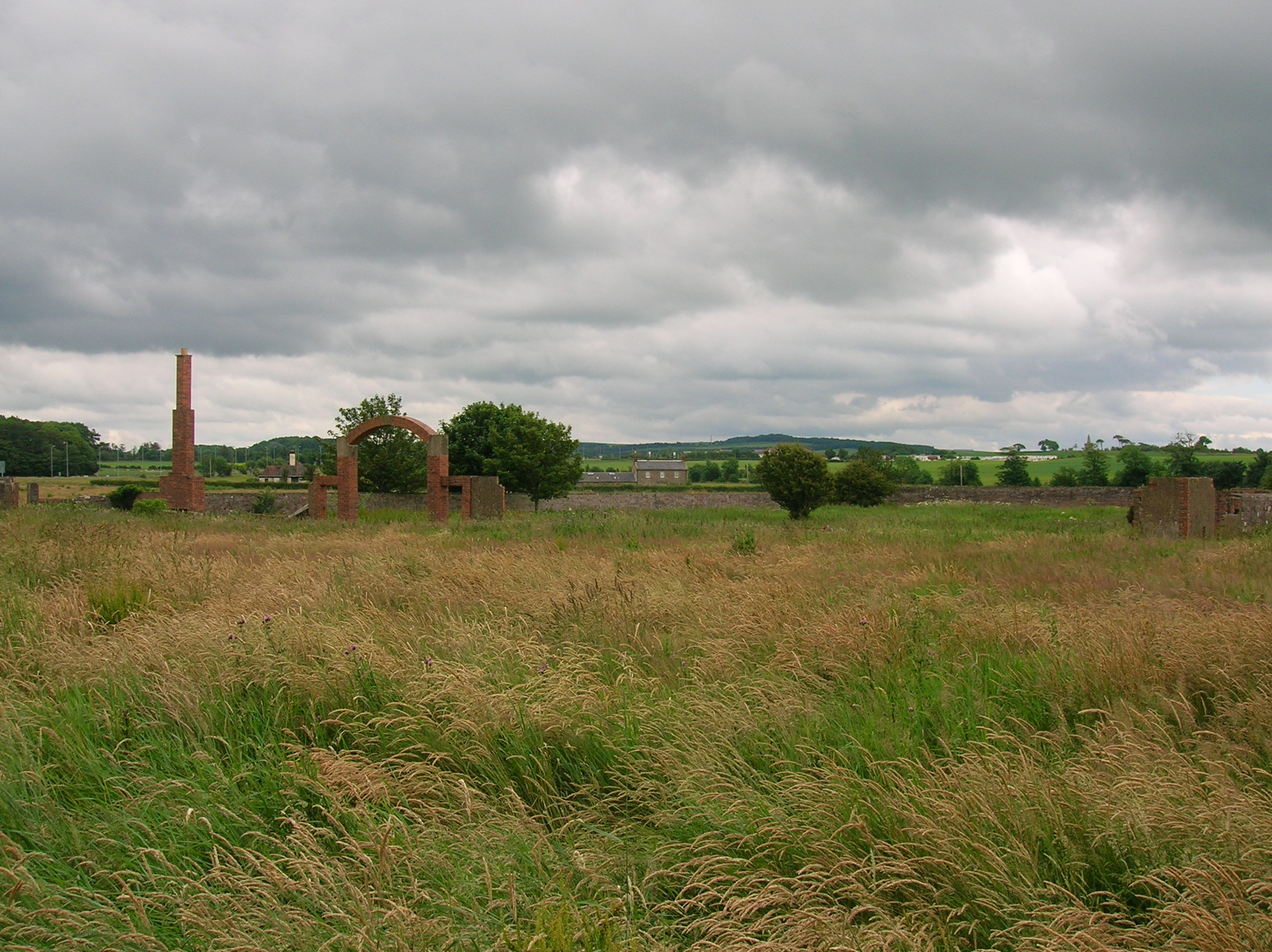
The old walled garden.

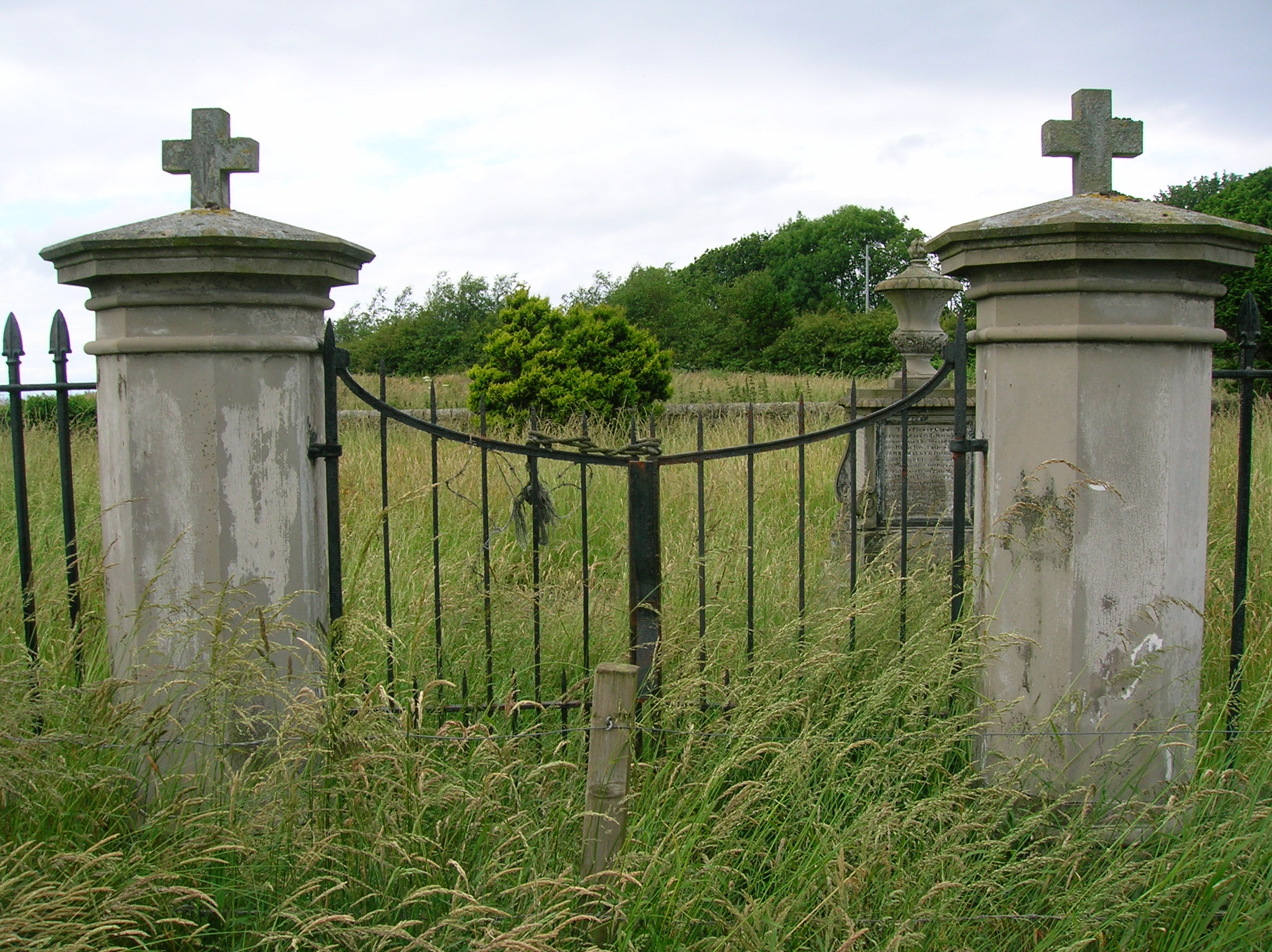
The cemetery gates

Colonel William Fullarton of that Ilk had owned Fairfield, however he sold it before he took up an appointment in Trinidad circa 1803. The property was held in 1851 by William Gunning Campbell at which time the house had a housekeeper, an undergardner, and two housemaids, in addition to the gardener and his laundress wife who lived at Fairfield Cottage. The property had a walled garden which survives as a ruin (2026) and a cemetery garden which remains in fair condition; the old Scottish unit of land measurement called a "fall" is recorded in the inscription. The last Campbell to live at the estate was W. G. Campbell and from the 1860s the property was run by trustees. Fairfield had been known as "Overmains" and had been a part of the lands of Monkton Castle, latterly known as Monkton House.

In the 1860s James Sinclair of Orangefield died and this 106-acre (43-hectare) estate was added to the 685 acres (277 hectares) of Fairfield. The associated farms were Fairfield Mains, Monktonmiln, Muirhouse, Orangefield and West Orangefield. Fairfield was sold in 1950 and demolished by the new owner who had planned to build villas and racing stables.

Campbell family Cemetery Garden and Lodge

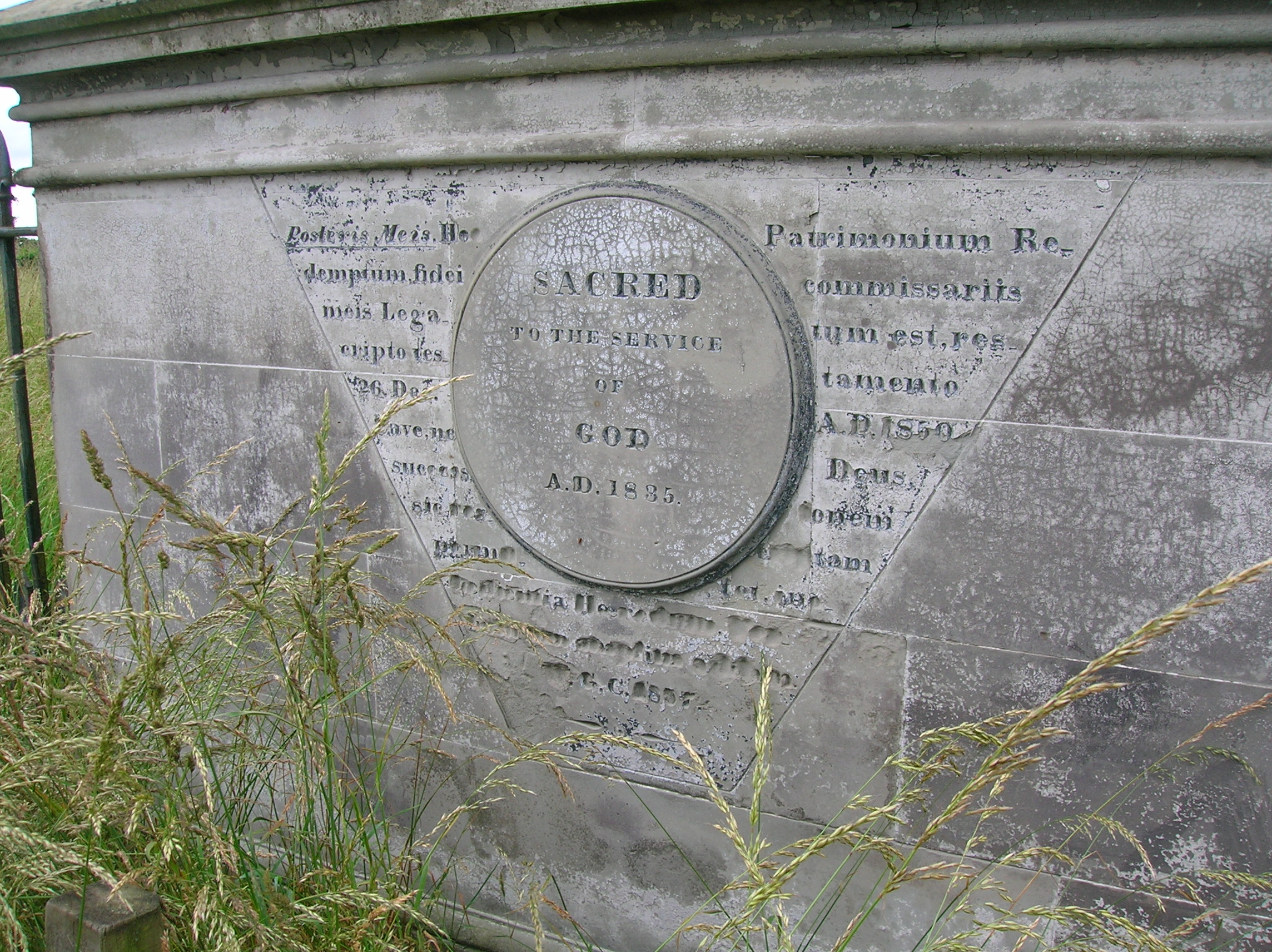
The 1835 dedication stone

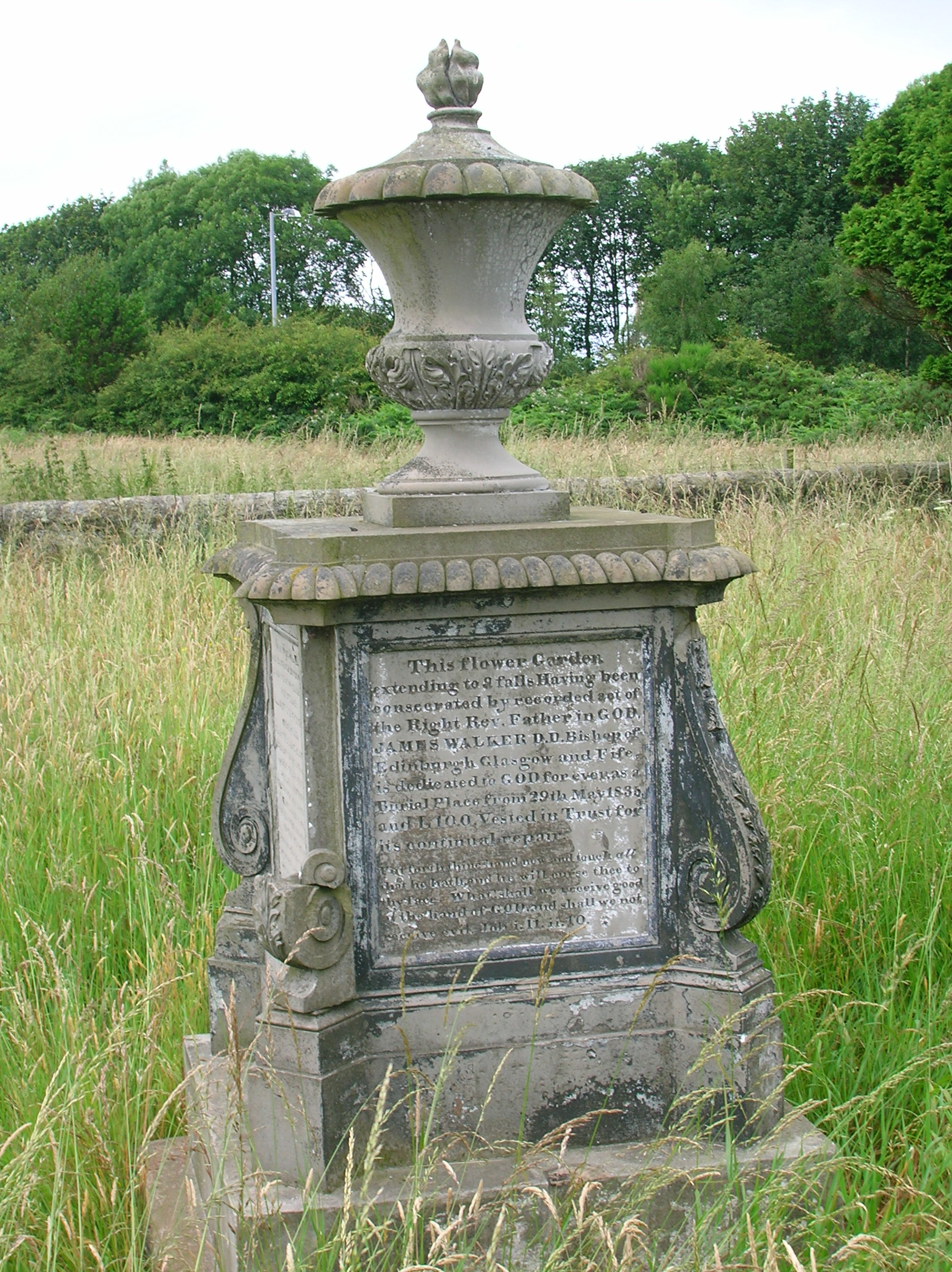
The '2 falls' cemetery garden Christian dedication stone.

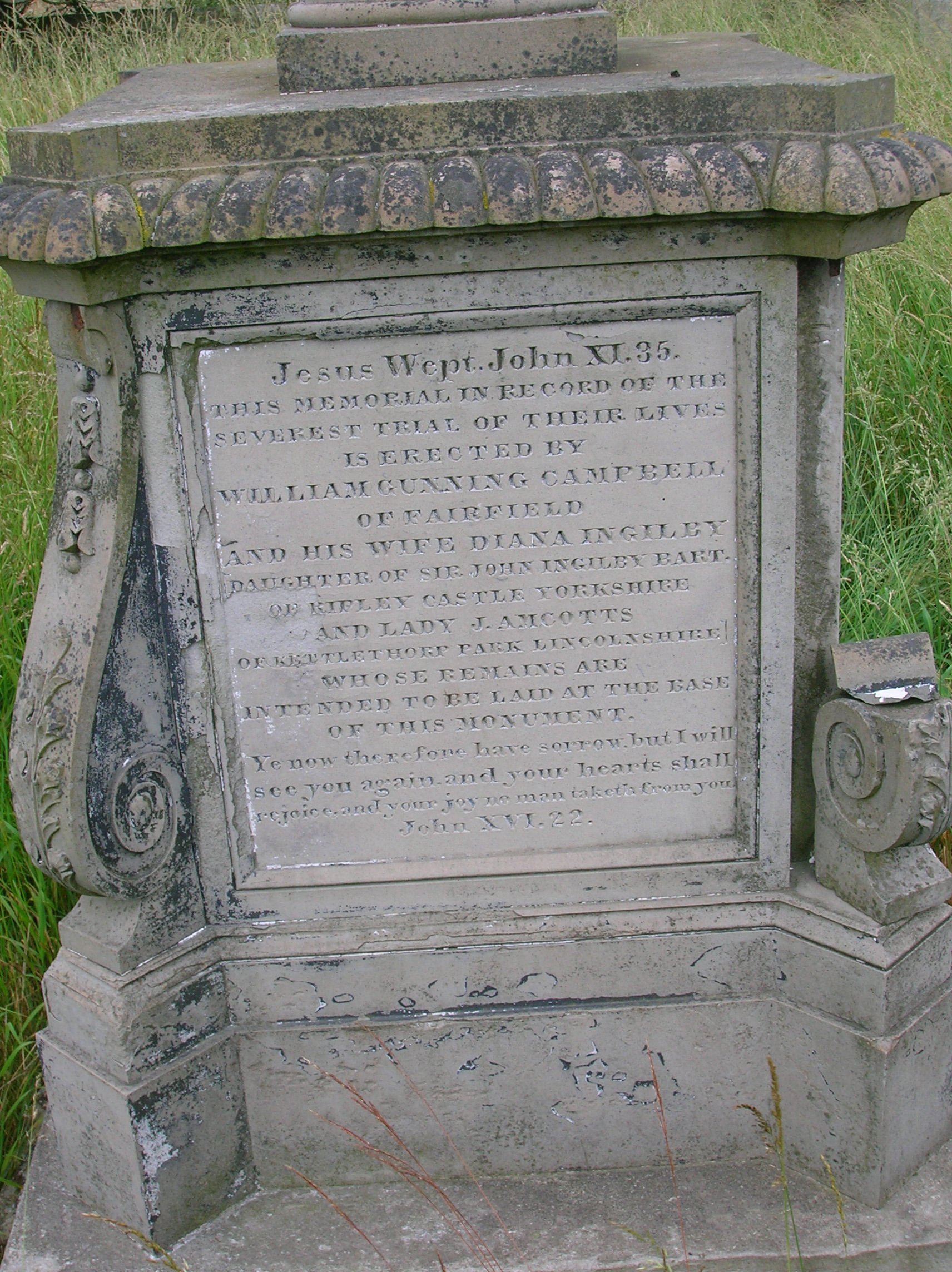
The 'Jesus wept' gravestone and inscription of William and Diana Campbell

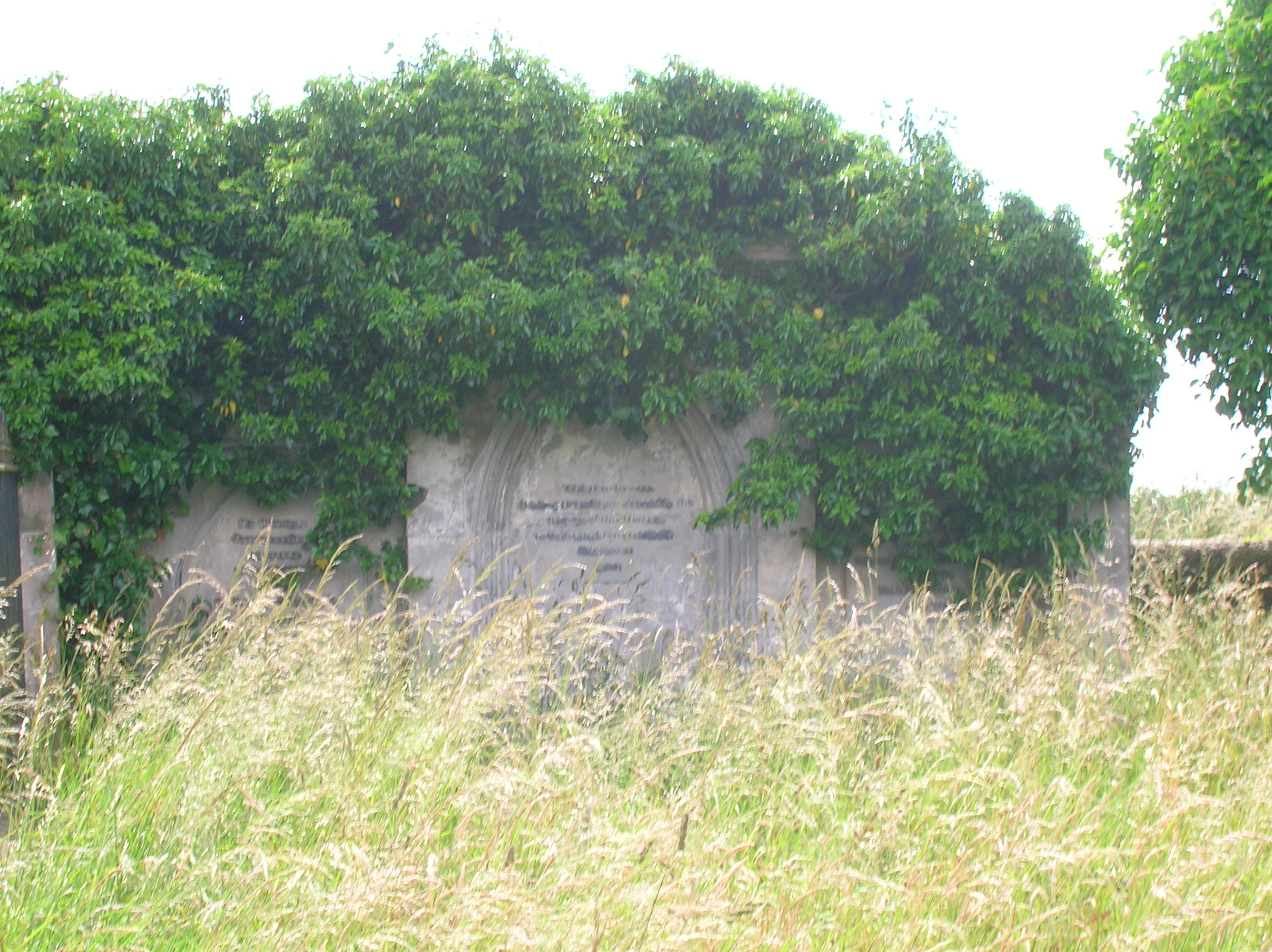
The mausoleum

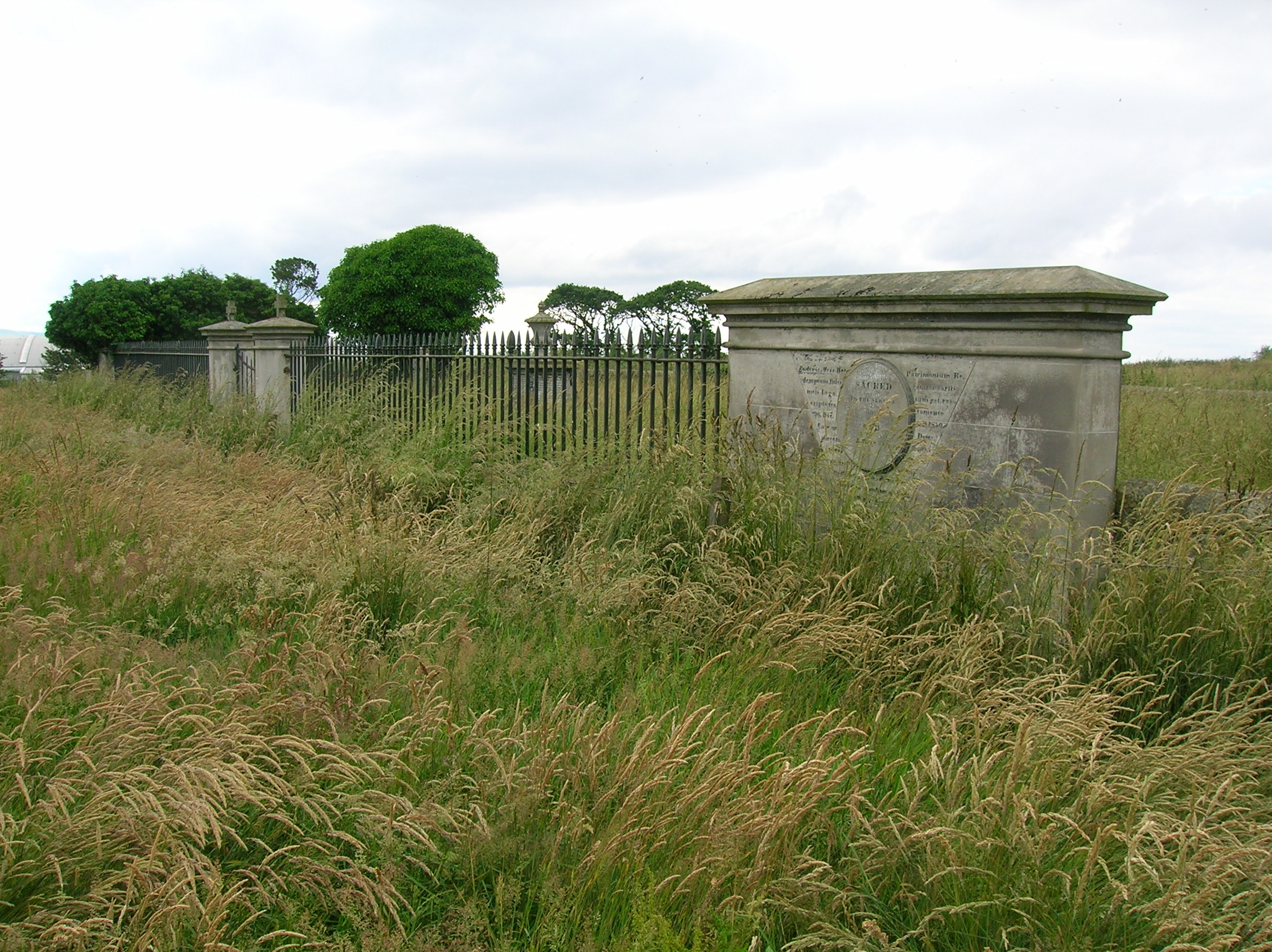
The cemetery garden railings and walls frontage.

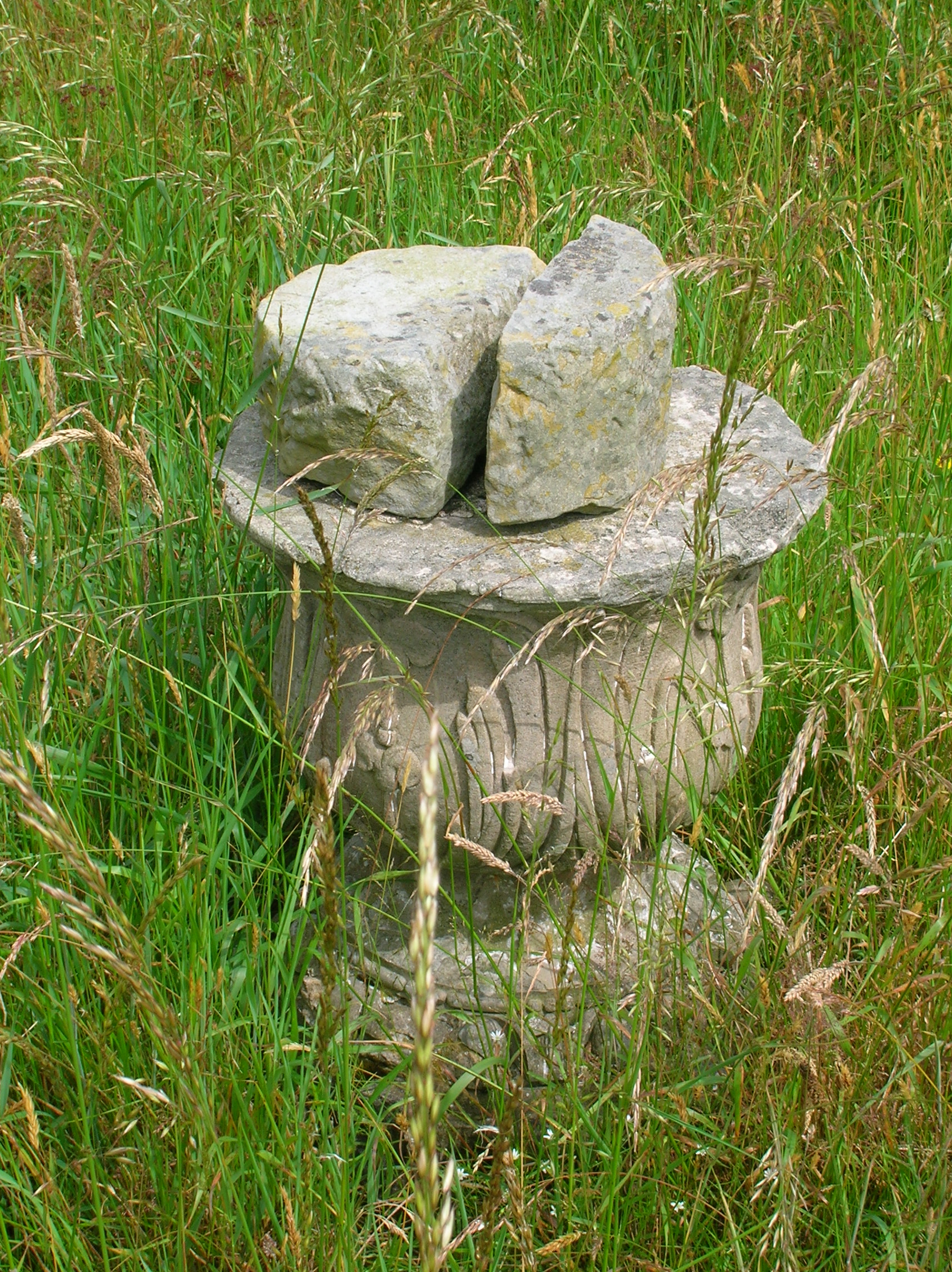
The base of an old sundial

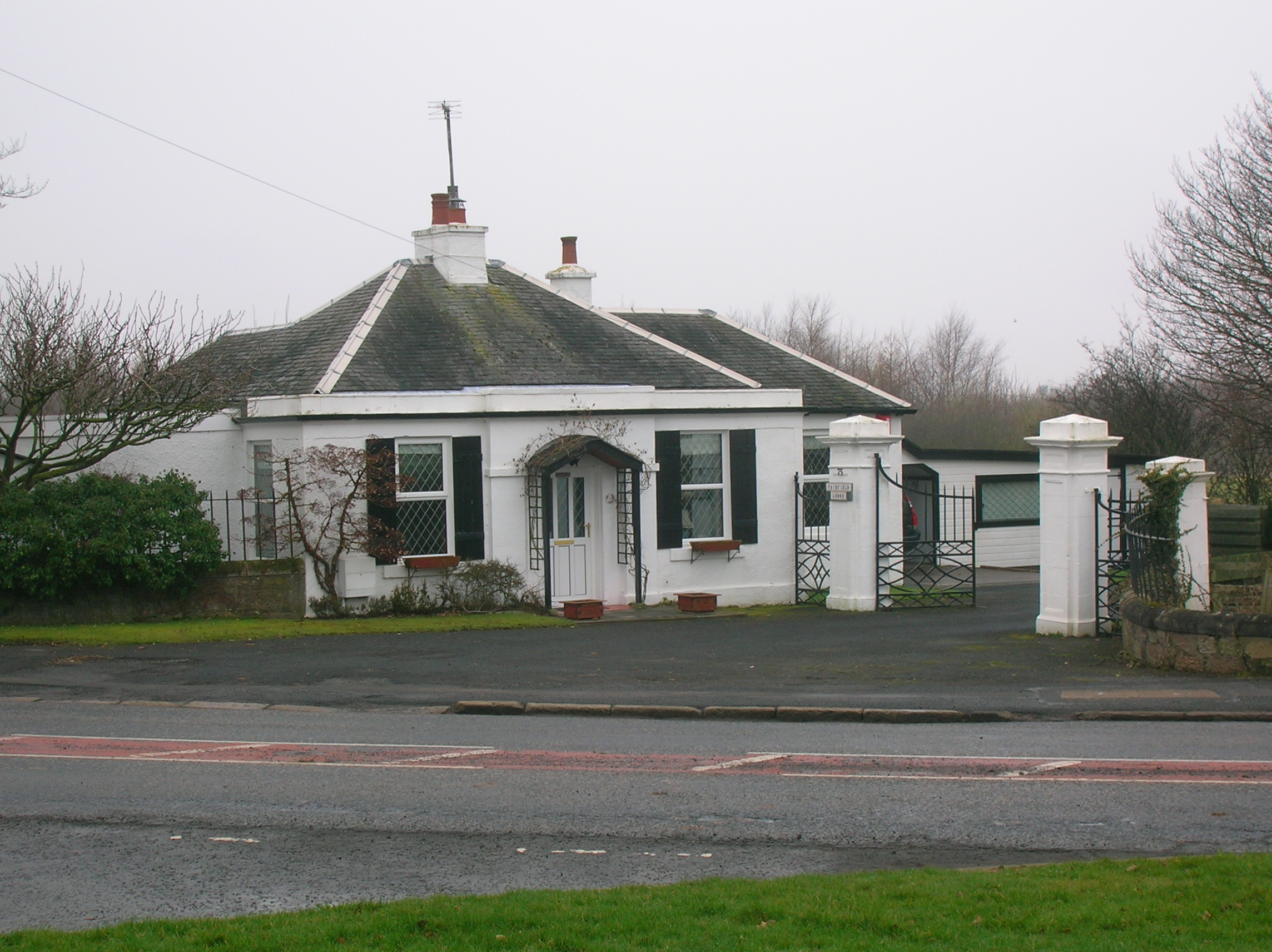
Fairfield Lodge

== Orangefield House ==
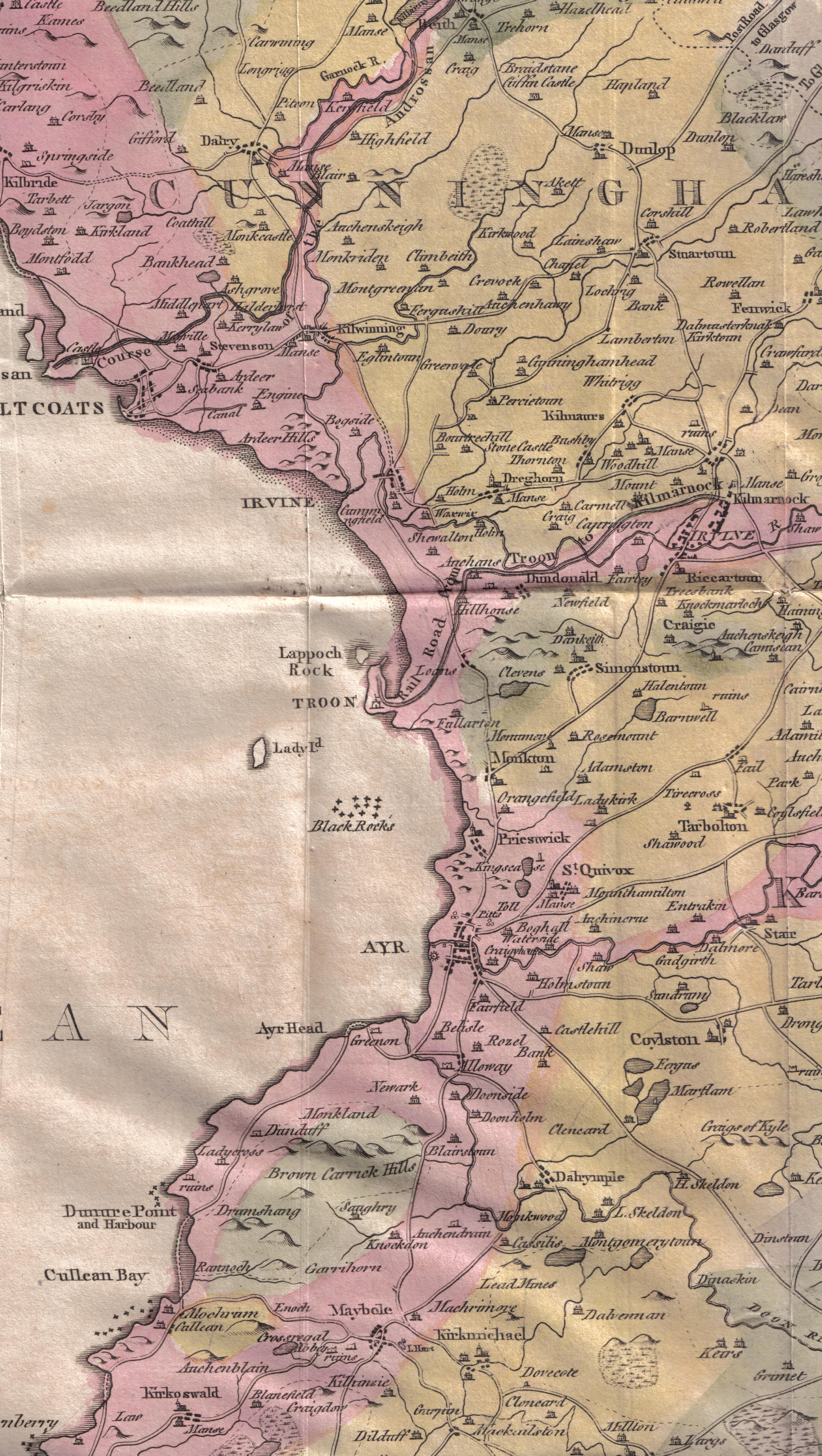
William Aiton's 1811 map showing Monkton.

=== James MacRae ===
Monkton House was rebuilt by James MacRae (1684–1746) who had been the President of Madras, 1725–1730 and came back with a fortune amounting to £100,000. He purchased the estate of Monkton in 1736 and renamed the house 'Orangefield' as he was a great admirer of William of Orange, William III; he died here in 1746

=== The MacRae monument ===
The MacRae Monument or 'Orangefield Family Burial Ground' near the village was built around 1750 by John Swan and is of the Corinthian style, with alcove, urns and obelisk. The site has been referred to as the Orangefield family burial-plot.
