= James Macrae =

British colonial administrator

President of Fort St George (Madras)
- In office 15 January 1725 – 14 May 1730
- Preceded by: Nathaniel Elwick
- Succeeded by: George Morton Pitt

Personal details
- Born: 1677 Ayrshire, Scotland
- Died: July 1744 (aged 67) Orangefield, South Ayrshire

James Macrae (1677 – July 1744) was a Scottish seaman and administrator who served as the President of Fort St George from 1725 to 1730. He is known for naval exploits against the pirate Edward England and for reforming the administration of Madras Presidency.

== Early life ==
James Macrae was born in 1677, in Ayrshire, Scotland. Little is known about his ancestry; according to the history of the clan Macrae his paternal grandfather was one John Macrae, also known as Ian Mac Ian Oig Dubh, "Black John the young son of John". Macrae's father died when he was barely five years old and the family moved to the town of Ayr, where they lived in a thatched hut. Macrae's mother found a job as a washerwoman. Macrae did not have any formal education of his own, but picked up bits and pieces of knowledge on the world around him. He added his own to the family's meagre earnings by delivering messages. Tired of poverty, Macrae soon ran away from home and sailed to India.

James Talboys Wheeler, writes that Macrae was "tired of this monotonous life" and "with the energy he showed then he would have assimilated the passionate desire to embark in commercial ventures of the time" More prosaically, Dr. Eric J. Graham, Scottish historian specializing in maritime history, concludes that embarking at sea in 1692, "Macrae fled a life close to starvation".

== Early career ==
Little is known about the first thirty years of his life. Macrae worked as a seaman in service of the British East India Company and rose to become captain. While functioning as the skipper of the Cassandra, Macrae encountered the fabled pirate Edward England near the Comoros on 17 August 1720. While Robert Kirtby and the Dutch vessel assigned to assist Macrae fled the scene, Macrae single-handedly engaged England. During a naval battle which lasted over three hours, Macrae and his men killed about a hundred of England's pirates who numbered about 500. However, seven more hours later, they faced heavy reverses and were forced to abandon ship. This naval battle was later described by Graham as the "bloodiest engagement and killing of pirates along the African coast".

Macrae enlisted the support of the king of the island and engaged the pirates once more. But injured in his head and with a price upon him set by Edward England, Macrae was forced to escape. Ten days later, however, Macrae surrendered and, after a heated debate on his fate, the pirates finally pardoned him (which incidentally sealed the fate of Edward England) and left the island on 3 September 1720. Macrae himself left five days later, arriving at Bombay on 26 October 1720.

== Governor of Madras ==
The East India Company, impressed by the Macrae's abilities, appointed him Superintendent in 1723, to investigate and end the chronic corruption that affected the English settlements on the west coast of Sumatra. In 1723, Macrae was appointed Deputy Governor of Fort St David. Macrae showed good administrative acumen as Deputy Governor. As deputy governor, Macrae promoted trade and commerce.

On the retirement of the then Governor of Madras Nathaniel Elwick on 15 January 1725, Macrae succeeded to his post. Macrae began an ambitious reform program. It increased the profits of the company, cut spending, and improved the exchange rate between gold and silver. In terms of public health, he launched a study of the city and its surroundings to reduce the high mortality rate. As a deviation from the company's general policy of discouraging indigenous trade and industries, Macrae promoted free trade and industry during his tenure. He restored decrepit buildings, strengthened fortifications, and promoted the first Protestant mission to the city in 1726.

Soon after Macrae became governor, there was a general unrest among the Nizam's soldiers in Visakhapatnam due to the indebtedness of the Nizam prompting fears that the soldiers might invade the city of Madras. Macrae sent a small army which restored order in the city. In December 1726, Macrae commissioned a revenue survey of the city. The houses and people within the limits of the city were enumerated and their castes and occupations recorded. On 24 September 1726, King George I issued a charter giving judicial powers to the Madras city administration. As per the charter, the mayor and aldermen of Madras were made a Court of Record and were authorized to handle civil suits. The Governor of Madras and his council constituted the higher court of appeal.

Macrae also exposed the corrupt practises of the Deputy Governor of Bencoolen & Sumatra, Joseph George Walsh, who had tampered with official accounts. Due to this expose, Walsh was suspended and recalled in 1726. Back in England, Walsh launched several charges against Macrae thereby prompting a detailed investigation. The ensuing scandal compelled Macrae to resign in February 1730.

== Later years ==
Macrae returned to Great Britain in 1730 and settled in the London suburb of Blackheath. At Blackheath, Macrae researched on his clan McGuire and traced their ancestry to Ayr. Macrae himself moved to Ayr, a couple of years later. In 1733, he was admitted as a citizen of the city of Ayr. He also financed an equestrian statue to William II of Scotland at Glasgow.

In 1736, Macrae purchased a property belonging to Hugh Bailie of Monktown, renaming it Orangefield. He, subsequently, surrendered the barony of Houston in Dumfriesshire. Macrae died in July 1744 and was buried in the cemetery of the church of Monktown. The category A listed Macrae Monument to his memory was erected by John Swan in 1750.
