= Murder of John Monckton =

2004 murder in London, England

John Victor Monckton (13 October 1955 – 29 November 2004) was a financier who was killed in his own house in November 2004, by Elliott White and Damien Hanson, while the latter was on probation after serving half of his 12-year sentence for attempted murder.

== Biography ==
Educated at Downside and Lincoln College, Oxford, he rose to the position of Managing Director of Bonds at Legal & General Group PLC, a large British insurance firm. He was a Roman Catholic, and a distant cousin of Viscount Monckton of Brenchley. He joined the Sovereign Military Order of Malta in 1977.

He was murdered and his wife severely assaulted at their home in Upper Cheyne Row in the Royal Borough of Kensington and Chelsea, nominally a low-crime area. His nine-year-old daughter called the police, but the killers fled the scene. A suspect, Damien Hanson, was arrested the following day.

== Murder ==
Hanson was eventually convicted of Monckton's murder and sentenced to serve three life sentences for killing Monckton, and the attempted murder of Monckton's wife Homeyra, in November 2004. His accomplice, Elliot White, is serving 18 years for manslaughter, wounding with intent and robbery.

The trial judge recommended that Hanson should serve a minimum of 36 years in jail before being considered for parole. This is one of the lengthiest minimum terms ever handed out in British legal history.

Hanson had at least one previous conviction for attempted murder when he killed Monckton. Hanson had been released from jail three months before the killing, halfway through his 12-year sentence. In 2006, Hanson's half-sister, Laura Campbell, was jailed for four years for providing a fake alibi for the crime.
