= Francisco de Busso =

Italian courtier in the service of Mary, Queen of Scots

Francisco de Busso (died 1576) was an Italian courtier in the service of Mary, Queen of Scots. Busso was a Master of Household, in charge of provisions and household servants.

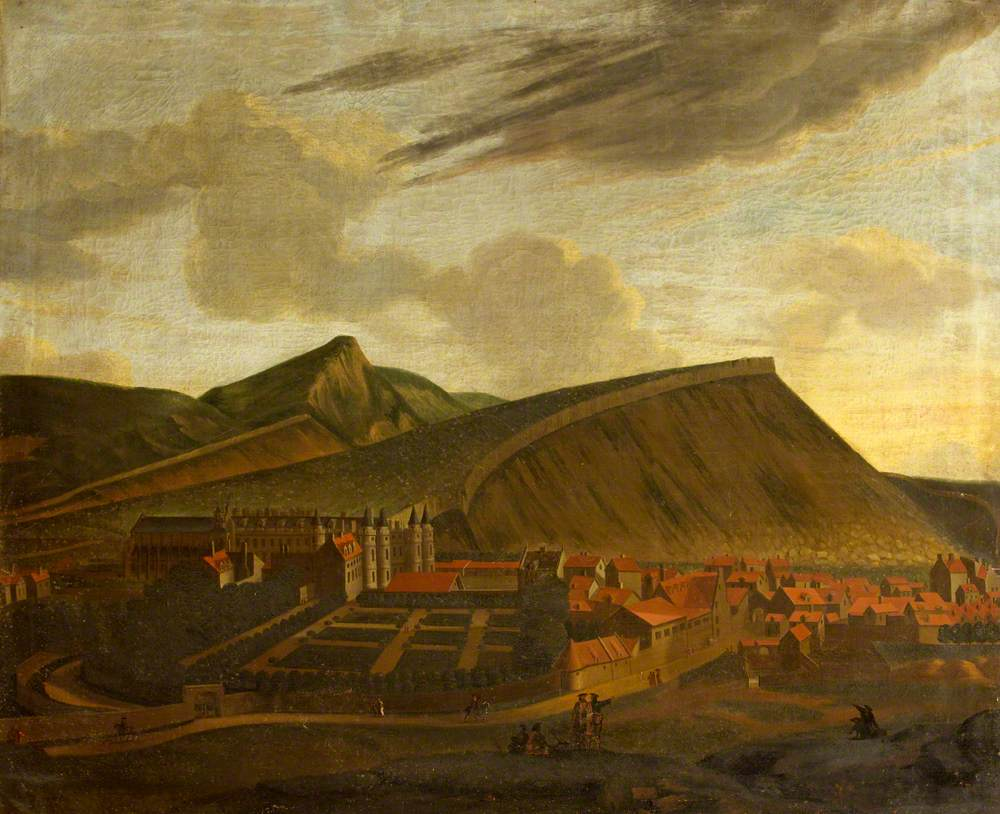
Francisco de Busso was briefly in charge of the fabric and gardens of Holyrood Palace

== Career ==
Busso had been a servant and Master of Household to Mary of Guise (died 1560). He was a Knight of the Order of St James of the Sword. In 1552, Mary of Guise sent him as an envoy or diplomat to Mary of Hungary, Governor of the Netherlands, when she wanted her to return some letters of Henri Cleutin which had chanced into her possession.

He was naturalized as Scottish in January 1556. After the death of Mary of Guise, Busso entrusted letters to the French ambassador in London to William Maitland of Lethington. Maitland forwarded them to William Cecil.

Mary, Queen of Scots, made him superintendent and overseer of her palaces and building works in September 1563. He was the Keeper of Holyrood Palace. His name appears in financial records of the court as "Senyeour Frances" or "Francisco". His first name is recorded as "John" in some official documents. He worked with William MacDowall to improve the gardens at Holyrood, and signed MacDowall's account in September 1564.

A French diplomat, Paul de Foix, noted he was close to Mary. In July 1565, Mary gave him a damask silk mantle from her mother's clothing and gave the rest of the outfit to the wife of the wardrobe servant Servais de Condé.

Busso had a prominent role at the Baptism of Prince James at Stirling Castle in December 1566. There was a procession bringing the food into the Great Hall, which Busso joined as a Master of Household walking with Gilbert Balfour and the Laird of Findlater.

Darnley's father, the Earl of Lennox, wrote to Queen Mary asking for a trial to try suspects in the murder of Lord Darnley. His letter of 17 March 1566 lists the names of suspects whose names had been written on "tickets" fixed to the door of St Giles. These included; the Earl of Bothwell, James Balfour, David Chalmers, Black John Spens, "Seigneur Francis", Bastian Pagez, a soldier John or Charles Bordeaux, and Joseph, the brother of David Rizzio.

Mary's secretary Claude Nau later wrote that when Mary was sent a prisoner to Lochleven Castle, Busso gave her wardrobe to her enemies. Soon after, when James Stewart, 1st Earl of Moray returned from France, he set a tailor who worked for his wife Annas or Agnes Keith, Countess of Moray to make Mary a new violet gown (une robbe de drap violet), and he let Mary have some of her older worthless clothes.

Busso continued to be involved in the maintenance of Holyrood Palace during the rule of Regent Morton. In November 1574 he received a payment for removing the steeple from the Chapel Royal, and in April 1576 for repairing a stable.

== Suspicion of foreign courtiers ==
John Knox wrote of the disapproval of Scottish courtiers at the influence of Busso and other foreigners preferred by Mary. In September 1565 the English diplomat Thomas Randolph listed him with David Rizzio, and the Englishman Thomas Fowler, as "unworthy persons" and foreigners who were exciting suspicion for their influence at court. In 1565 the leaders of the Chaseabout Raid, a rebellion against Mary, included his presence in their list of grievances.

Knox also wrote that Busso, and three other men of the "queen's domestics and strangers", were involved by the Earl of Bothwell in the murder of Lord Darnley.

== Death ==
He died at Dunkeld in April 1576. His wife was Margaret MacCartney.

Francisco de Busso had a son, John. Francisco de Busso owned a property in Gray's Close in Edinburgh, but because of illegitimacy ownership was transferred to John Maitland of Thirlestane.
