= Simon Preston of Craigmillar =

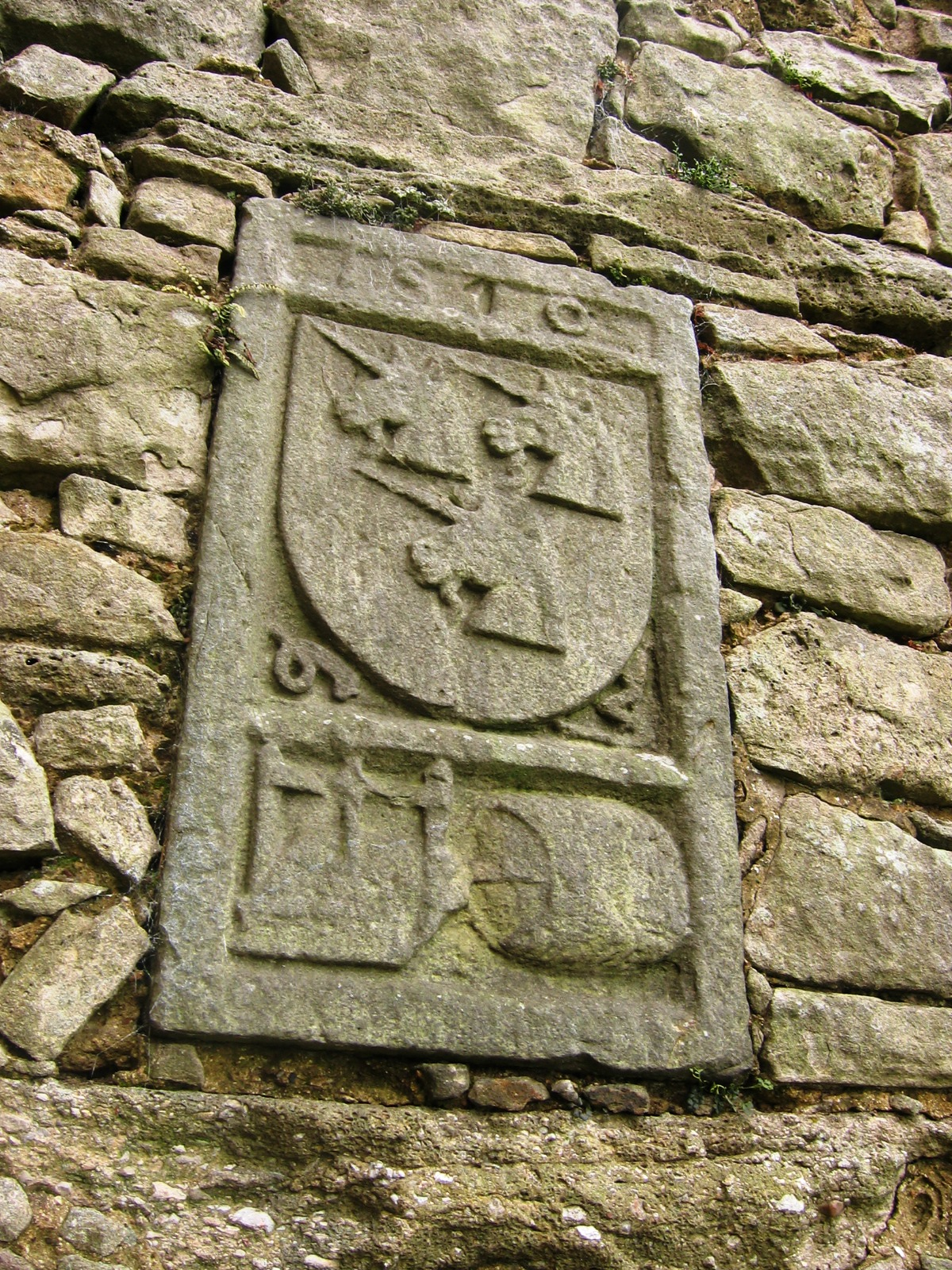
Simon Preston's arms at Craigmillar Castle with his name - rebus of a "press" and "tun"

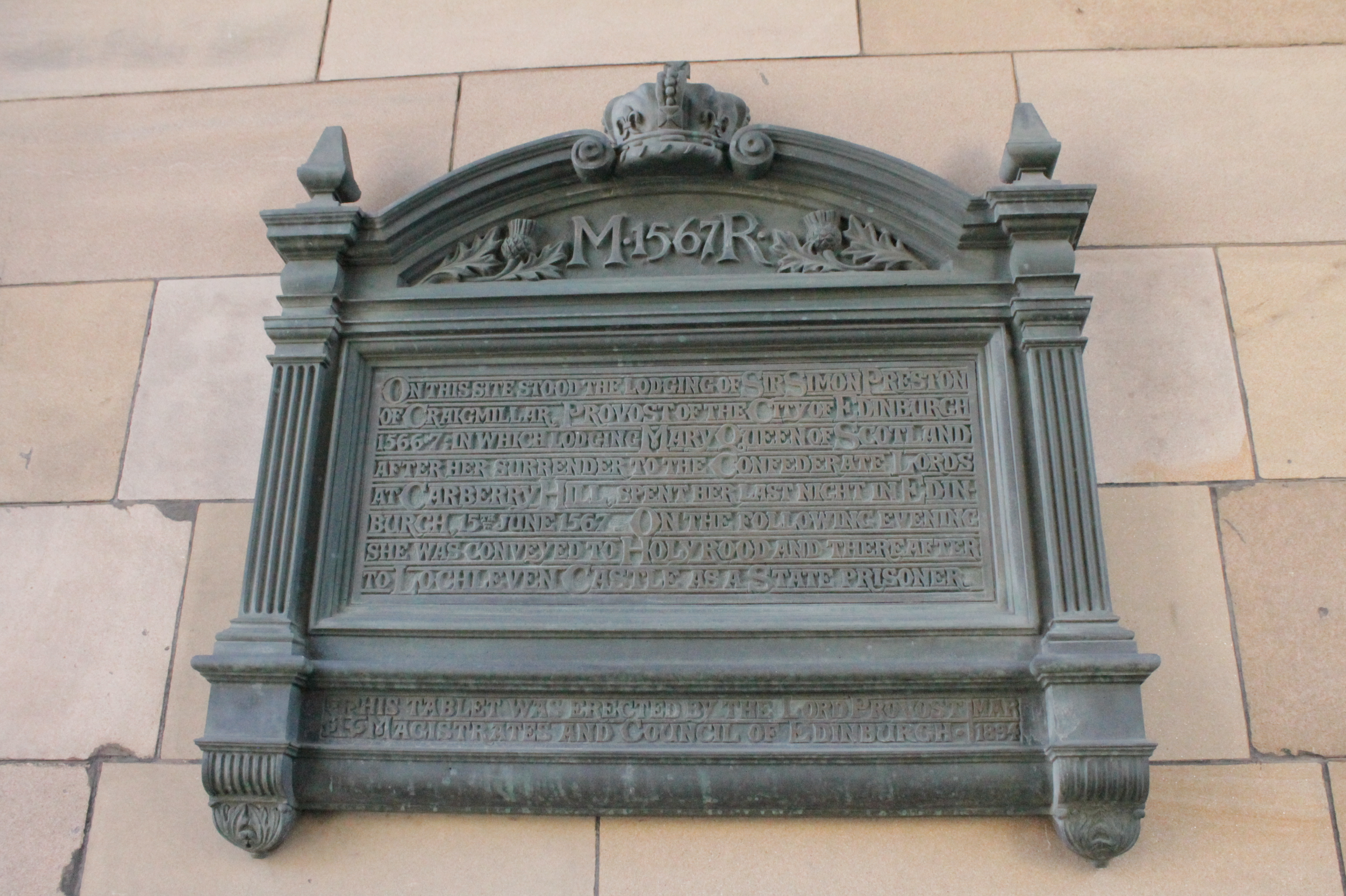
Plaque to Simon Preston of Craigmillar, Edinburgh City Chambers

Simon Preston of Craigmillar (c. 1510 – c. 1570) was Provost of Edinburgh during the years 1565 to 1569 and was a member of the Privy Council of Scotland during the reign of Mary, Queen of Scots.

== Political career ==
Simon Preston was involved in the rebuilding of Holyrood Palace in September 1554 for Mary of Guise, Regent of Scotland. He supplied lead for the roof of the tower. The palace had been damaged by an English army in 1544. Tantallon Castle came into the hands of Mary of Guise in February 1557. The Earl of Cassillis appointed Preston as the castle's keeper.

In January 1561 Queen Mary sent Simon Preston to Scotland as her envoy and commissioner. He and his three colleagues were instructed to announce the death of her husband Francis II of France, and her decision to return to Scotland. They came first to Preston's own Craigmillar Castle, and met William Maitland of Lethington. The English diplomat in Edinburgh Thomas Randolph was not very pleased with this news (which did not suit his view of England's foreign policy), but wrote that Preston was the best of the "packe" of four in which "the moste hope is of Cragmellour."

Preston was understood to be a Catholic. Mary made him captain of Dunbar Castle, and in August 1565, at the time of the rebellion called the Chaseabout Raid, he submitted his requirements for maintaining the artillery including tools, timber, tallow and fish oil and for provision of cheese, salt fish, and firewood. Mary made him her preferred candidate for the Provost of Edinburgh, to replace Archibald Douglas of Kilspindie, (namesake son of Archibald Douglas of Kilspindie).

When David Rizzio was murdered in Holyrood Palace in March 1566, Queen Mary was held in the palace by the conspirators. Preston came to the palace to ask what was going on. Henry Stuart, Lord Darnley, who had been an instigator of the plot, declared from a window that all was well.

On 6 October 1566 the Privy Council made Preston collector-general of a tax of £12,000 Scots to be raised to entertain the ambassadors at the baptism of Prince James. Queen Mary came to Craigmillar in November after her stay at Jedburgh. Darnley visited for a night. Mary's nobles and advisors discussed a possible divorce for her.

In 1567, Preston was granted the building complex around Trinity College Church by the state, but two days later gifted it to the city, asking that the main ancillary building be used as a hospital for the poor.

Preston's loyalty to Mary wavered before her final battle in Scotland at Langside, and on 8 May 1568 he signed a bond with William Kirkcaldy of Grange to defend James VI of Scotland and Regent Moray against her.

== Houses ==
Preston had two properties in Edinburgh: one in the city; one in the country, as was the norm of the day. His country residence was Craigmillar Castle, where the garden pond shaped as his initial "P" can still be seen. His city residence (demolished to build South Bridge) was known as the Black Turnpike, and stood on the corner of Hunter Square near the Tron Kirk. Some chronicles say that Mary, Queen of Scots, was held at Preston's lodging in Edinburgh after the battle of Carberry Hill.

== Family ==
He married Elizabeth Menteith, and secondly Janet Beaton. Elizabeth's son David Preston was Simon's heir.

In September 1553, Regent Arran gave Preston a ring at the christening of one his children, bought from Alexander Gilbert, an Edinburgh goldsmith.
