= John Tamworth =

English courtier, Member of Parliament and ambassador

John Tamworth (died 1569) was an English courtier, Member of Parliament (1563), and ambassador to Scotland.

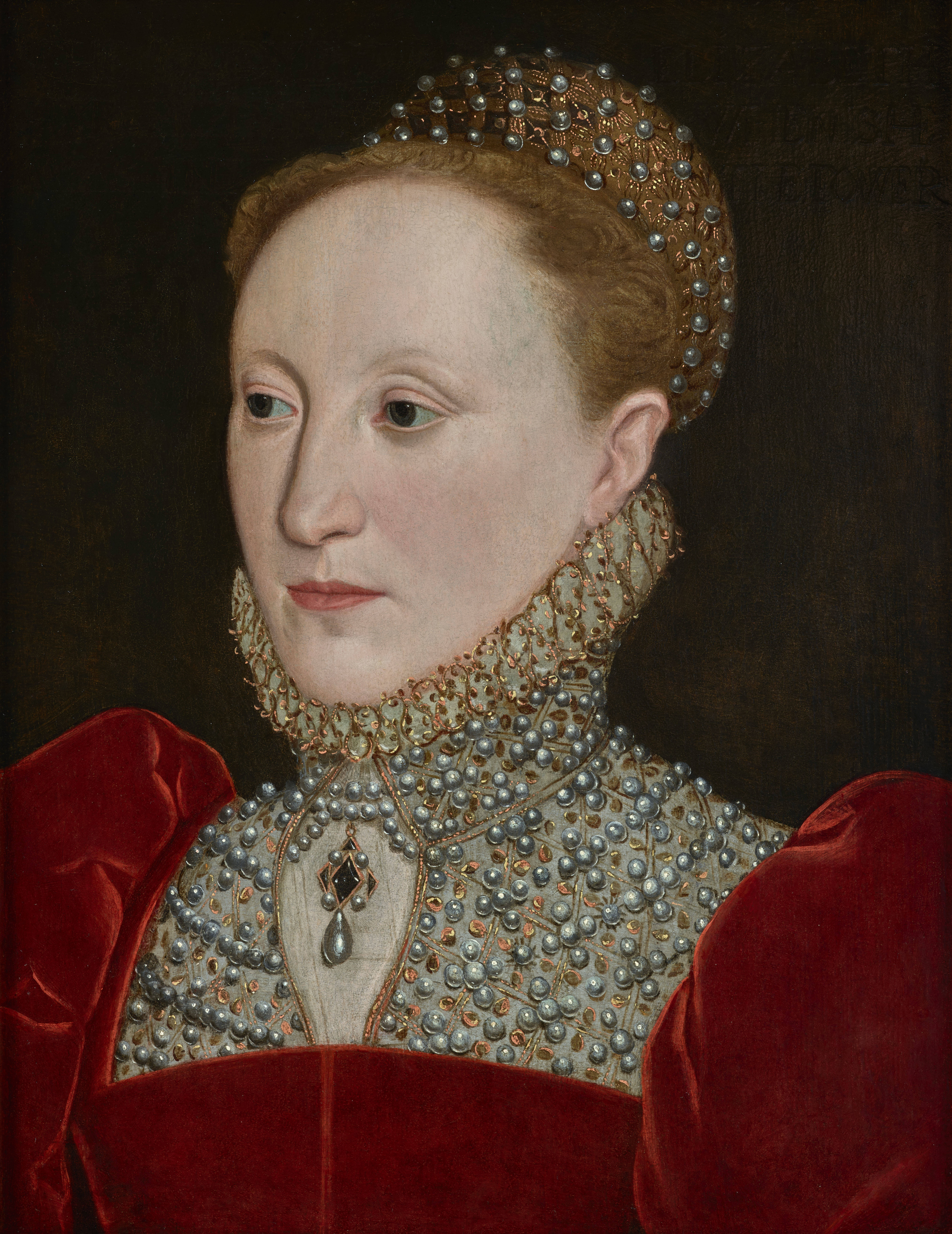
Tamworth's account of the Privy Purse mentions pearls bought to sew on the partlets of Elizabeth I

== Career ==
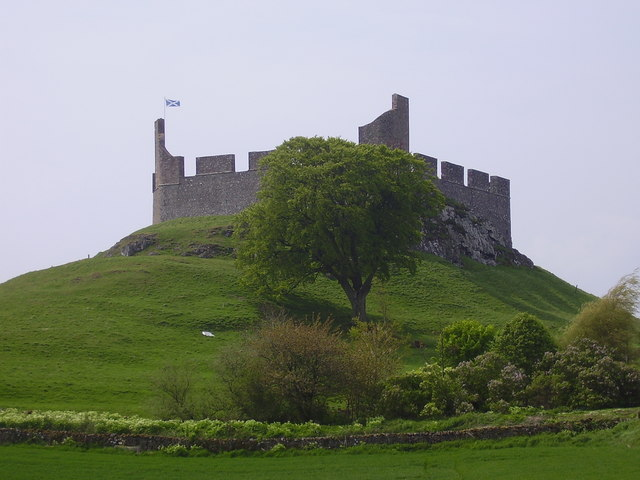
John Tamworth was imprisoned at Hume Castle in August 1565 for not acknowledging Lord Darnley as king

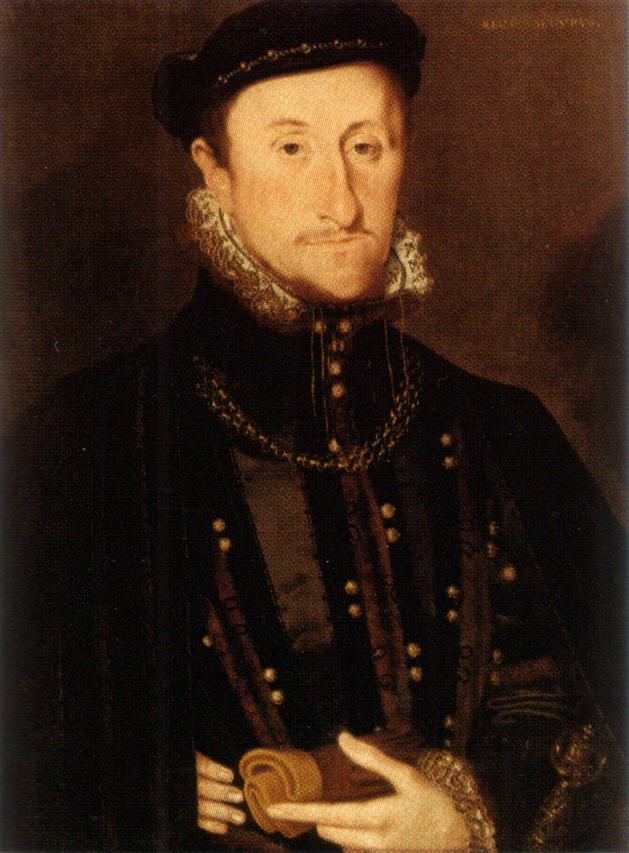
Tamworth supplied money to the Earl of Moray to fund his rebellion against Mary, Queen of Scots in 1565, and to support his rule of Scotland after her abdication

He was a son of Thomas Tamworth and Elizabeth Denkaring. The surname is sometimes spelled "Tomworth" or "Thomworth". He seems to have spent time in Italy in the 1550s, and continued to buy books printed in Italy, including a thesaurus, The Abundance of Words by Giovanni Marinello.

In 1562, he married Christina or Christian Walsingham, daughter of William Walsingham and Joyce Denny, and sister of Francis Walsingham. Their eldest daughter Christian Tamworth died young, Their younger daughter Elizabeth married George Reresby.

John Tamworth was Member of Parliament for Boston in 1563.

=== Keeper of the Privy Purse ===
Tamworth was a Groom of the Privy Chamber and Keeper of the Privy Purse to Elizabeth I. An account of the purse survives in the British Library, and was first published in 1823.

Tamworth's receipts include £100 given by the City of Coventry to Elizabeth at her Royal Entry on 17 August 1566, and £100 from the City of Oxford on 31 August (Tamworth was awarded an MA). He paid for jewels, precious stones, and pearls for the queen, gave money to Thomas Litchfield to buy lute strings, he bought a great sackbut for Elizabeth, and paid for perfumes and bookbinding. The Keeper of the Privy Purse also paid the wages or stipends of the queen's gentlewomen and maidens of honour. Tamworth paid for supplies given to the silkwoman Alice Montague and for gold lace used by the queen's tailor Walter Fyshe. He also accounted for the wages of artisans, including the "Mistress Launder" who was supplied with 520 pearls costing a penny each, and in six months remade or "translated" Elizabeth's partlets.

=== Master of Toyles ===
Tamworth was also in charge of "Toyles", formerly part of the office of revels, tents and toyles. A "toyle" was a canvas cloth for covering a wagon, but also, in this case, a stand of nets used in hunting.

His account mentions 75 cloths bought for "the Toyle" in July 1566. Elizabeth hunted at Hatfield in July and Kenilworth in August. From the evidence of surviving financial records, Elizabeth does not seem to have frequently used this form of hunting. Mary I of England and Philip II of Spain hunted on 7 August 1554 in Windsor forest over a four or five mile long course with a "toyle".

=== Mission to Scotland ===
He was sent as ambassador to Scotland in 1565 in matters concerning the marriage of Mary, Queen of Scots to Lord Darnley and the beginnings of the rebellion known as the Chaseabout Raid. He brought several complaints, and advice that Mary ought not to reverse the Scottish Reformation. He brought money to Agnes Keith, the wife of the rebel leader James, Earl of Moray. He was instructed to speak to Mary in favour of her half-brother Moray. He was given a frosty reception by Mary on 7 August, and told that Elizabeth should "meddle no further" with her private business.

After consulting with Thomas Randolph, Tamworth refused a safe-conduct or passport written out by Sandy Hay and signed jointly by Mary and Darnley, as Elizabeth had not yet recognised Darnley as a co-ruler.

Randolph mentions that some men in Edinburgh drew their swords to threaten him and Tamworth. During his journey back to Berwick-upon-Tweed, on 21 August 1565, Tamworth was stopped by 30 "well furnished warlike" horsemen near Dunbar and detained at Hume Castle for 5 days.

Elizabeth I complained to a French diplomat Michel de Castelnau about Tamworth's detention. Randolph spoke to Mary at Holyrood Palace for Tamworth's release while Darnley was away visiting the new fortress on Inchkeith. Mary agreed to send a letter to Lord Home to secure his freedom. On 26 August Mary and Darnley left Edinburgh to address the rebellion in the west of Scotland.

=== Funds for the Earl of Moray ===
After his interview with Mary in August 1565, Tamworth consulted with Moray and his allies. Judging that a rebellion was likely, he sent to Berwick-upon-Tweed for the money that Elizabeth had promised them. Later, two Scottish landowners or lawyers, James Nicolson and John Johnston, fled to England and wrote to Elizabeth for help. Mary had placed them "in extremity" and sent soldiers to occupy their houses and evict their families. Nicolson and Johnston had delivered the "first aid of money" from Tamworth to Moray.

Mary wrote about John Johnston and the English money in a letter to Robert Melville in February 1566. She had granted Johnston a pardon or remission for his actions and he told her what had happened. Mary wrote that Johnston had delivered 3000 crowns in three bags from Randolph and Tamworth to Agnes Keith, "my Lady Murray" at St Andrews. This was clear evidence that Elizabeth was trying to subvert her rule. Mary made Johnston tell the story in front of Randolph. Randolph merely said that Johnston "might speak his pleasure, as anyone would do being in his case", and as a diplomat, he only had to answer to Elizabeth. Mary wrote that she was planning to expel Randolph and wanted Melville (who was in London) to explain the matter to the Earl of Leicester. She wanted Melville and the French ambassador to make a report to Elizabeth, laying the blame on Randolph. Randolph left Edinburgh and stayed at Berwick.

Mary sent a message to Rambouillet, a French diplomat going to London in February, that he should tell Elizabeth that the payments had been discovered. News of the embarrassment of Elizabeth's diplomats speread around Europe. Tamworth's account of the privy purse mentions a further £3,000 from Thomas Gresham sent to the Earl of Bedford at Berwick in September 1565, and £5,000 lent to Moray in 1568 at the Westminster Conference.

== Death ==
He died at Fulham on 23 April 1569 and was buried at St Botolph's Aldersgate. His widow married William Doddington of Breamore (died 1600). Tamworth's place at court as Groom of the Privy Chamber was given to Henry Middlemore.
