= James Lauder =

James Lauder may refer to:

- James Lauder (musician), 16th-century Scottish composer
- James Eckford Lauder (1811–1869), Scottish artist, famous for both portraits and historical pictures
- James Lafayette, pseudonym of James Stack Lauder (1853–1923), Irish portrait photographer
