= Robert Melville, 1st Lord Melville =

Scottish diplomat

Robert Melville, 1st Lord Melville (c. 1527–1621) was a Scottish diplomat, administrator, jurist, and intriguer, and uncle of the poet Elizabeth Melville.

== Family ==
Known as Sir Robert Melville of Murdocairnie or Murdochcairnie, Robert was the second son of Sir John Melville of Raith in Fife and Helen Napier of Merchiston. His younger brother Sir James Melville of Halhill wrote a famous political memoir. Another brother, Andrew Melville of Garvock, joined the household of Mary, Queen of Scots in Scotland.

Robert married firstly; Katherine Adamson; secondly Mary Leslie, daughter of Andrew Leslie, Earl of Rothes; thirdly, Jean Stewart, daughter of Robert Stewart, Earl of Orkney. He had a daughter Christiane and his son and heir with Katherine Adamson, Robert Melville, 2nd Lord Melville.

== Career ==
During the Scottish Reformation, Robert Melville sided with the Protestant Lords of the Congregation. He was sent to England as a diplomat by Mary, Queen of Scots. He opposed her marriage to Henry, Lord Darnley in 1565 and joined the rebellion called the Chaseabout Raid. Melville was sent to Elizabeth I of England as the rebel lords' envoy. A French diplomat in London, Paul de Foix, discovered that money for the rebels had been delivered to Melville. He was forgiven by Mary and sent again to the English court as her diplomat.

Mary expelled the English diplomat Thomas Randolph and Elizabeth ordered Melville's return to Scotland on 15 March 1566. He arrived in Edinburgh and reported back to Elizabeth and Cecil on the aftermath of the murder of David Rizzio. He brought her letters from the Earl of Bothwell who was now the Duke of Orkney.

When Mary was captured at the battle of Carberry, Melville took Elizabeth's letters to her at Lochleven Castle and brought her requests to the Confederate Lords and her supporters. On the day that James VI of Scotland was crowned he wrote to Elizabeth that her ambassador Nicolas Throckmorton had helped defuse the situation and save Mary's life. According to a memoir of Mary's captivity sent to Cosimo I de' Medici by his ambassador in Paris, Giovanni Maria Petrucci, George Douglas and Robert Melville were witnesses to her being threatened and pressured to abdicate.

Melville worked for Regent Moray, taking clothing fabrics to Mary at Lochleven in August 1567. Melville arranged with Sir Valentine Browne, treasurer of Berwick, for loans of money secured with pledges of Mary's jewels. However he supported Mary at the Battle of Langside in 1568. After Mary fled to England, Melville brought jewels, clothing, and horses to her at Bolton Castle in October 1568.

Subsequently, Melville joined his nephew William Kirkcaldy of Grange who held Edinburgh Castle for Mary. At the end of the "lang siege", Grange, Melville, and the Laird of Pittadro climbed down the castle walls on a rope to negotiate their surrender with William Drury. Melville was imprisoned at Holyroodhouse and at Lethington Castle (now Lennoxlove.)

While awaiting his "examination", a kind of interrogation, in September 1573, he wrote to the English diplomat Henry Killigrew and Cecil for help. Melville said his enemies were destroying his reputation, saying that he had hindered peace, and knew all the secret dealings between France, England and Scotland. He said he had never been happy to receive help from Flanders. Melville hoped for English political intervention for his release. On 19 October 1573 Melville was questioned about negotiations for the marriage of Mary Queen of Scots to John of Austria, her escape from Lochleven Castle, her good and jewels, her proposed marriage to Thomas Howard, 4th Duke of Norfolk, the siege of Edinburgh Castle and those who supplied it with silver or gave loans secured against pledges of Mary's jewels.

In 1582 Melville was rehabilitated and gained a role in the Scottish exchequer as Treasurer-Depute. Melville held the keys to the chests of jewels stored in Edinburgh Castle. In 1587 he was sent to England with William Keith of Delny and the Master of Gray to intercede for Mary's life. Their speeches and manner of mediation was said to have been counter-productive.

In the late 1580s James VI of Scotland asked him to help the printer Robert Waldegrave who was in trouble in England. He was Chancellor when James VI sailed to meet Anne of Denmark. On 11 May 1590 he hosted the Danish Admiral Peder Munk at Rossend Castle at Burntisland. Munk was travelling to Falkland Palace to take sasine of Anne of Denmark's "morning gift".

In August 1592 the court was at Dalkeith Palace. Margaret Winstar, a Danish servant of Anne of Denmark, helped her lover, the rebel John Wemyss of Logie escape from the palace. James VI was angry and held a council, and sent the Earl of Morton and Melville to the queen to demand she sent Winstar back to Denmark. The queen refused to speak to them.

In July 1593 he was ambassador in London and had an audience with Elizabeth I of England. His mission was to collect a subsidy or annuity of £4,000 which Elizabeth gave to James VI, and ask for 34 elm trees for the king's garden. She later complained that Melville had spent half of the money in London for the king, rather than taking it back Scotland. In 1594 he was made a judge as Lord Murdocairnie.

Melville was involved with the factional politics of Anne of Denmark. She supported Melville in 1593 when rivals at court tried to make him resign the post of treasurer. On 25 July 1595 James VI came to Holyrood Palace from Stirling Castle, after receiving a letter from Melville assuring him the queen was ill, on the testimony of the Mistress of Ochiltree and other gentlewomen. There was some doubt over the queen's illness because a plot was suspected. In August 1595, she came to his house on the way to Perth.

In 1616 he was made Lord Melville of Monimail.

He died in 1621.

== Painted Ceiling ==
During the 1590s Melville's apartment at Rossend Castle was decorated with a painted ceiling now displayed at the National Museum of Scotland.

Peerage of Scotland
New creation	Lord Melville; 1616–1621	Succeeded by Robert Melville
