= Agnes Keith, Countess of Moray =

Scottish noblewoman (c. 1540–1588)

Lady Agnes Keith
- Countess of Mar; Countess of Moray; Countess of Argyll
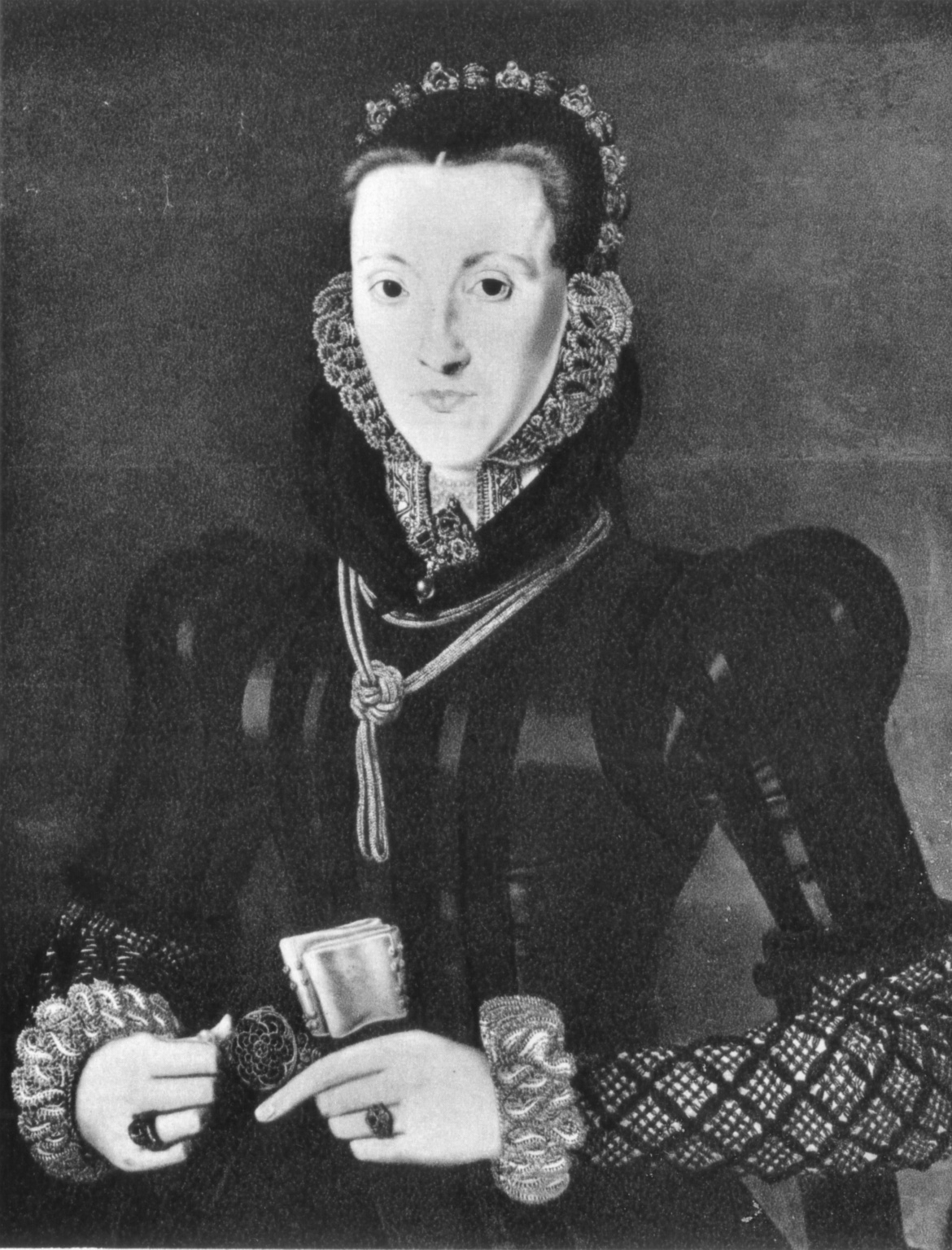
- Agnes Keith, 1562
- Born: c. 1540; Dunnottar Castle, Aberdeenshire, Scotland
- Died: 16 July 1588 (aged 47–48); Edinburgh, Scotland
- Buried: St. Giles Cathedral, Edinburgh, Scotland
- Noble family: Keith
- Spouses: James Stewart, 1st Earl of Moray (m. 1562–1570) Colin Campbell, 6th Earl of Argyll (m. 1572–1584)
- Issue: Elizabeth Stewart, 2nd Countess of Moray; Annabel Stewart; Lady Margaret Stewart; Hon. Colin Campbell of Lundie; Lady Jane Campbell; Archibald Campbell, 7th Earl of Argyll
- Father: William Keith, 4th Earl Marischal
- Mother: Margaret Keith

Agnes Keith, Countess of Moray (c. 1540 – 16 July 1588) was a Scottish noblewoman. She was the wife of James Stewart, 1st Earl of Moray, regent of Scotland and the illegitimate half-brother of Mary, Queen of Scots, making her a sister-in-law of the Scottish queen. As the wife of the regent, Agnes was the most powerful woman in Scotland from 1567 until her husband's assassination in 1570.

She was married secondly to Sir Colin Campbell, heir presumptive to the earldom of Argyll. When he succeeded his brother as the 6th earl in 1573, Agnes was henceforth styled Countess of Argyll. During her second marriage, Agnes became embroiled in a litigation over Queen Mary's jewels which had earlier fallen into her keeping. It was her refusal to hand the jewels over to the Scottish Government that sparked a feud between the Earl of Argyll and the Regent Morton.

Agnes was also known as "Annabel" or "Annas". Historians prefer to use the name Annas Keith, reflecting a contemporary spelling, and her usual neat italic signature throughout her lifetime "Annas Keyth".

== Family ==
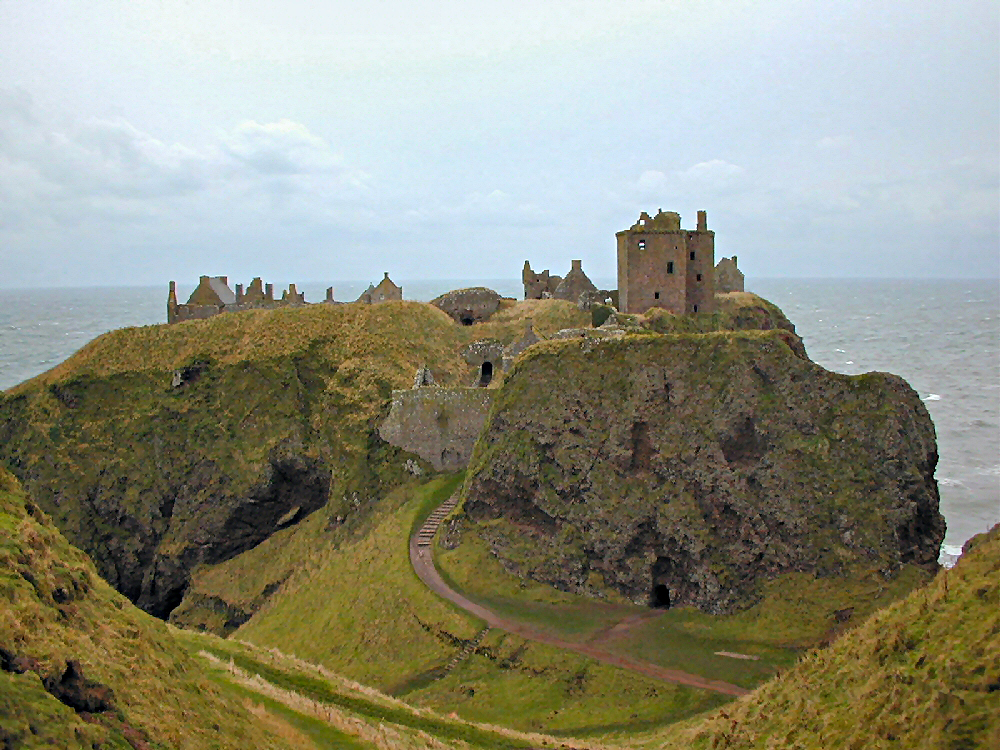
Dunnottar Castle, the birthplace of Agnes Keith

Lady Agnes Keith was born in Dunnottar Castle, Aberdeenshire, Scotland in about 1540, the eldest daughter of William Keith, 4th Earl Marischal, and Margaret Keith. Agnes's father was a member of Queen Mary's Privy Council; he had fought at the Battle of Pinkie in 1548. He died in 1581. Her paternal grandparents were Robert Keith, Master of Marischal, and Lady Elizabeth Douglas, and her maternal grandparents were Sir William Keith and Janet Gray. Agnes was a descendant of King James I of Scotland and his consort Joan Beaufort, who was in her turn the great-granddaughter of King Edward III of England.

She had two brothers, William Keith, Master of Marischal (died 1580), and Robert Keith, 1st Lord Altrie (died 1596); and six younger sisters. These were Elizabeth, wife of Sir Alexander Irvine of Drum; Alison, wife of Alexander Abernethy, 6th Lord Saltoun; Mary, wife of Sir John Campbell of Calder; Beatrice, wife of John Allardice of Allardice; Janet, wife of James Crichton of Frendraught; and Margaret, wife of Sir John Kennedy of Balquhan. Her aunt was Elizabeth Keith, wife of George Gordon, 4th Earl of Huntly who would lead an unsuccessful rebellion against Mary, Queen of Scots in 1562. Her first cousin was Lady Jean Gordon, the first wife of James Hepburn, Earl of Bothwell, who became the third husband of Mary, Queen of Scots.

== First marriage ==
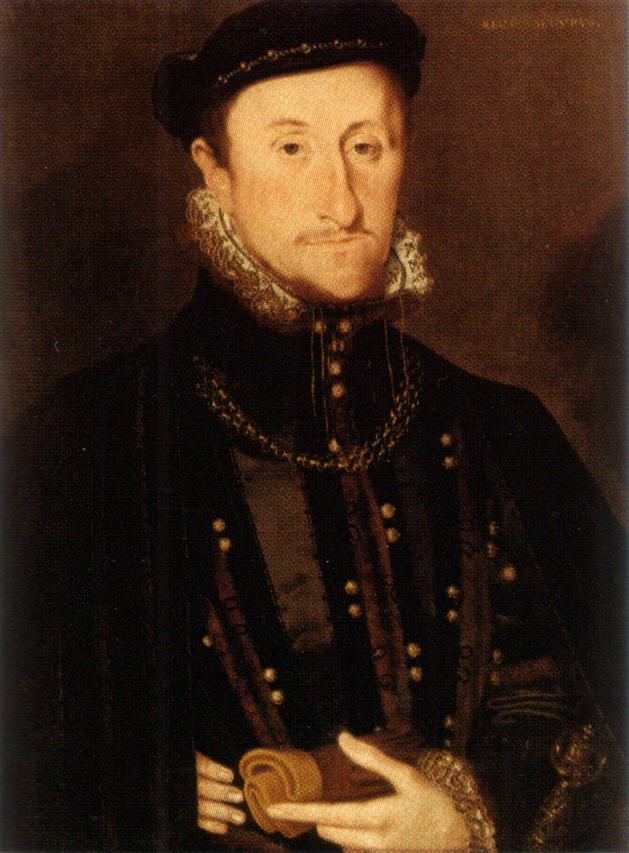
Portrait of James Stewart, 1st Earl of Moray, the first husband of Agnes Keith. It was painted by Hans Eworth in 1562

At St. Giles Cathedral, Edinburgh or at Holyrood on 8 February 1561/2, Agnes was married to James Stewart, the illegitimate half-brother and chief adviser of Mary, Queen of Scots, who had been created Earl of Mar the previous day. The ceremony was magnificent, attended by many of the nobility. John Knox preached the sermon. Portraits were made of the couple, and these are now kept at Darnaway Castle.

Agnes' portrait shows that her hair was auborn coloured. Her jewels include a brooch at her neck with two diamonds, a ruby, and a pendant pearl. A similar jewel appears in another portrait by Eworth, said be of Anne Askew. Between her hands a round or oval object may be case for a miniature portrait. The effect of the jewels and dark costume has been described as a "costly austerity".

The lavish wedding was followed by three days of festivities and banqueting at Holyrood Palace. There were fireworks and a tournament. According to the chronicle of Robert Lindsay of Pitscottie the feasts included wild venison, poultry, and "all other kind of delicate wild beasts" which impressed Queen Mary's uncle, the Marquis of Elbeuf. The Queen's tailor provided red and white taffeta for masque costumes at this time, probably for the wedding celebrations, and it was said the festivities were the beginning of "masking" in Scotland. The last event was a supper in Cardinal Beaton's palace at the corner of the Cowgate and Blackfriar's Wynd, and afterwards the young men of the town came in procession, in "convoy" to greet her, some in masque costume in "merschance", a Scottish form of Mummery. The frivolity was subsequently denounced by Knox with the words: "the vanity used thereat offended many godly".

The wedding seems to have provided an opportunity to discuss the possibility of Mary, Queen of Scots, travelling to England to meet Elizabeth I. Although the English diplomats Nicholas Throckmorton and Thomas Randolph promoted the scheme, the meeting never took place.

Queen Mary made much of the new Lady Moray and regarded her as a close member of her family. Agnes was well-educated, with "genuine intelligence and spirit", and was "clever, acquisitive and steely". Mary rode from Falkland Palace to St Andrews for the wedding of one of Agnes' ladies in waiting in April 1564 and planned to be with Agnes when her child was born. The child was a son who died soon after birth.

Agnes and her husband together had three daughters:

- Elizabeth Stewart, 2nd Countess of Moray (late 1565 – 18 November 1591), on 23 January 1581 married James Stewart of Doune, by whom she had five children including James Stewart, 3rd Earl of Moray.
- Lady Annabell Stewart (1568/69 – 1570), according to the Diurnal of Occurrents, Annabell was born at Stirling around 22 May 1568.
- Lady Margaret Stewart, (born posthumously late January/18 April 1570 – before 3 August 1586), in 1584 married Francis Hay, 9th Earl of Errol. The marriage was childless.

The queen had secretly given her half-brother the title of Earl of Mar in January 1562. This title belonged to George Gordon, 4th Earl of Huntly, himself married to Agnes' aunt, Elizabeth. James later agreed to give up the title of Earl of Mar, it being an Erskine family perquisite, but retained the earldom of Moray. This provoked the Earl of Huntly to lead a rebellion in the Scottish Highlands against the queen. The rebellion was encouraged by Agnes's aunt. Huntly and his rebels were soundly defeated by James's troops at the Battle of Corrichie on 22 October 1562. Some of Huntly's forfeited belongings were sent to furnish the Morays' new castle of Darnaway.

=== Chaseabout Raid ===
The Earl of Moray and his half-sister became enemies following Mary's marriage to Henry Stewart, Lord Darnley in July 1565, a man to whom Moray was fiercely opposed. It does not appear, however, that his wife shared the same hostility towards the queen. Elizabeth I sent a diplomat John Tamworth with money to fuel the quarrel, which was delivered to Agnes Keith at St Andrews. Moray was declared an outlaw following his rebellion, known as the "Chaseabout Raid", against his sister in August, and went into exile in England. It was planned that Agnes Keith, who was pregnant, would join him in September, sailing in a ship belonging to Charles Wilson. She waited on the coast of Fife for eight days for Wilson, in vain, after his ship was captured by an English sailor Anthony Jenkinson, commander of the Aid. Agnes rode back and forth staying in a different place each night.

Due to her advanced stage of pregnancy, Agnes was unable to join her husband in England. She remained behind at their home at St. Andrew's Priory in Fife, and on an unknown date late in 1565, she gave birth to a daughter, Elizabeth. Upon recovery from her confinement, she resumed the successful management of the Moray estates. Her husband returned to Scotland following the murder of Queen Mary's secretary David Rizzio in March 1566 and was pardoned by the queen. There was still some uneasiness, as Mary discovered that Elizabeth had sent 3,000 or 4,000 gold crowns to Agnes in August 1565 during the rebellion.

=== Prince James, Stirling, and Jedburgh ===
It was recorded that in August 1566 following the birth of Prince James, the future King James VI of Scotland, Agnes was one of the ladies with whom the queen kept the most company. Agnes was briefly in charge of Prince James at Stirling Castle in September. She was with Mary when the queen was ill at Jedburgh, and the "Book of Articles" later claimed that Mary made her pretend to be ill to prevent Darnley staying.

It was said that Agnes welcomed the English ambassador Francis Russell, 2nd Earl of Bedford, with a kiss, when he arrived at Stirling for the baptism of James VI. In early February 1567, Agnes suffered a miscarriage, which provided her husband with an excuse to hastily depart from Edinburgh; thus he was away when Lord Darnley was murdered.

=== Most powerful woman in Scotland ===
Queen Mary was deposed by the Confederate Lords at the battle of Carberry Hill, while Moray was still in France. Mary was taken in custody to Lochleven Castle. At this time, Agnes was acting as "commissioner and procurator" for her husband's business and legal affairs.

At first, the Lords would not forward Moray's letters to Mary. Agnes stayed with the Queen and her mother-in-law at Lochleven in July 1567. The English ambassador in Edinburgh Nicholas Throckmorton heard there was "grete sorowe betwixt the Queen and her at theyre meeting and much gretter at theyre departing." Throckmorton had heard that Mary was pregnant and this may have prompted Agnes' visit.

Soon after on 24 July 1567, Mary abdicated. The Earl of Moray was proclaimed Regent of Scotland for the infant King James VI on 22 August 1567. When Moray came back to Edinburgh, they hosted a dinner on 14 August 1567 for the English ambassador, and Agnes was attended by Jean Kennedy, the wife of Lord Robert.

Moray was proclaimed Regent of Scotland on 22 August 1567. While her husband held the regency, Agnes, Countess of Moray was the most powerful woman in Scotland. She was a very intelligent and intimidating politician, and many people were afraid of incurring her wrath. In May 1568, before the Battle of Langside, she coldly informed her frightened cousin, George Gordon, 5th Earl of Huntly, "ye haf mad me angary". Huntly had indicated that he would support Mary rather than Regent Moray.

Moray was assassinated at Linlithgow in January 1570, by James Hamilton of Bothwellhaugh, a supporter of Queen Mary. Hamilton, using a pistol, fired at James from a window as the latter was passing in a cavalcade in the main street below, fatally wounding him.

Agnes was pregnant at the time of her husband's murder. She went to Dunnotar and delivered a daughter, Margaret, shortly afterwards. She spent the two years following his assassination managing the family estates and fighting a series of legal battles in which she sought to obtain financial compensation for the time he acted as regent.

In April 1570, John Wood, Moray's secretary visited William Douglas at Lochleven Castle. He spoke to Margret Erskine, Lady Lochleven. She was looking after Agnes Keith's daughter. The child was "merry and very lusty". Her nurse was pregnant and wanted go home. There had been a problem shipping Agnes's clothes to Dunnotar and William Douglas helped Wood check the coffers containing her "gentlewomen's gear and ornaments" at the Priory of St Andrews.

While Agnes was at Dunnotar, her mother-in-law, Margaret Erskine, looked after her second eldest daughter, Annabell at the New House of Lochleven Castle. Although Annabell was described as "merry and very lusty" by Agnes' secretary John Wood in April 1570, some months later Margaret had to write to the widowed Countess of Moray describing her death. She told Agnes that "God sall send your Ladyschip barnis efter this, for ye ar young aneuch."

== Second marriage and excommunication ==
Between 13 January 1571 and 26 February 1572, Agnes became the second wife of Sir Colin Campbell, the son of Archibald Campbell, 4th Earl of Argyll, and Lady Margaret Graham, and heir presumptive to the earldom of Argyll, by whom she had another three children:

- Hon. Colin Campbell of Lundie (died before 15 May 1619), married Maria Campbell, by whom he had issue.
- Lady Jane Campbell, married Sir Donald Campbell
- Archibald Campbell, 7th Earl of Argyll (1575–1638), married firstly Lady Agnes Douglas by whom he had three children, including Archibald Campbell, 1st Marquess of Argyll; he married secondly Anne Cornwallis, by whom he had issue.

Agnes was excommunicated by the Church on 25 April 1573 for non-adherence to her husband. He was, in fact, said to have been "much advised by Agnes"; in another document it was recorded that Sir Colin was "overmuch ledd by his wyf". Agnes' second husband the 6th Earl of Argyll recorded that he was 'much advised by his wife' and she was considered an 'Intelligent and frightening politician.'

Upon the death of her brother-in-law Archibald Campbell, 5th Earl of Argyll on 12 September 1573, Agnes, as the wife of Sir Colin who had succeeded his childless brother as the 6th earl, was henceforth styled as Countess of Argyll. Agnes and her husband had been journeying to Darnaway Castle in Moray where they had planned to spend the winter when news reached them of the 5th earl's death. They stopped instead at Dunnottar Castle and made alternative plans. Agnes wrote from Dunnotar to the laird of Kilravock on 1 November 1573. She asked him take order with tenants who were cutting down the woods of Lochindorb without permission.

=== Queen Mary's jewels ===
After the Queen Mary was removed to Lochleven Castle in 1567 her jewels came into the Earl of Moray's custody. Moray sold some of the crown jewels to Elizabeth I of England and pledged others to fund the civil war. Agnes obtained some of these jewels and a coral belt. Mary, Queen of Scots wrote to Agnes from Tutbury Castle soon after Moray's assassination on 28 March 1570 regarding these jewels. Mary wanted them sent to her in England including a piece made up of diamonds and rubies called the "H". This was the "Great Harry", a diamond and ruby jewel given to Mary on the occasion of her first marriage by her father-in-law, King Henry II of France. Mary added a postscript to this letter in her own handwriting that Agnes's family and retainers would feel her "displesour".

The Earl of Huntly asked for the jewels on Mary's behalf on 1 November 1570. Agnes Keith wrote from Dunnotar on 2 November 1570 to William Cecil asking that he ensure Elizabeth I would help defend her and her children against Huntly's actions. Mary herself wrote again to Agnes for the jewels on 27 January 1571. However, the Regent Lennox had also asked for them on 13 September 1570. Facing a dilemma between handing the jewels over to Mary or the Scottish government. Agnes chose to hang onto the jewels.

It was Agnes' desire to hold onto these valuable jewels which provoked a feud between her second husband and the Regent Morton, who demanded their return on behalf of King James VI of Scotland, threatening the couple with arrest if they failed to deliver the jewels which he insisted belonged to the Scottish Crown. Agnes argued that she retained the jewels as a pledge for the debts owed to her for the expenses that the Earl of Moray had laid out as Regent of Scotland. She claimed that Moray's executors including William Douglas of Lochleven and John Wishart of Pitarrow, had not acknowledged these debts, and she could now provide details.

When Agnes and her husband failed to hand over the jewels to the Privy Council, they were both "put to the horn" (declared rebels) on 3 February 1574. The Earl of Argyll's "misliking" of the Regent's action became known. Agnes canvassed the support of Henry Killigrew, an English diplomat in Edinburgh, sending him as a gift a "leische" of three hunting hounds.

Agnes appealed to the Parliament of Scotland, and wrote several articulate, formal letters to Queen Elizabeth requesting her intervention which would permit Agnes to retain the jewels. Elizabeth responded that Agnes would not have to repay £5,000 or any sums she had loaned to Regent Moray.

Agnes was reluctant to produce or "exhibit" the jewels for Morton and the Scottish Privy Council, thinking that he would retain them. Morton offered her conditional terms on 12 August 1574 to retain the jewels and be "relaxed be from the horn". He thought that Elizabeth I would be satisfied if she signed an undertaking to him that she retained the jewels on behalf of James VI. He wanted them valued by "able" goldsmiths in Edinburgh. Agnes forwarded copies of letters and a series of offers or negotiation points between her and Morton to Francis Walsingham for consideration in September 1574, hoping for an English diplomatic response in her favour.

The lengthy inquiry and litigation with Regent Morton over the custody of the precious stones, ended on 5 March 1575, when the earl, in his own name and that of Agnes, surrendered them to Morton, although discussions about compensation for Moray's debt's continued. Meanwhile, to raise money, Agnes had to pawn her own jewels with merchants and goldsmiths. A list includes a belt given her by Moray and a garnishing of gold, gold chains, and a diamond set "tablet" which she pawned to a kinsman James Keith. Agnes sent the lawyer Thomas Craig to plead her case, on behalf of her daughters, for the money owed to Regent Moray, and losses incurred during Morton's pursuit of the jewels. The Earl of Argyll would later be partly responsible for Regent Morton's fall from power and loss of the Regency in 1578.

== Later years ==
In November 1579, an English messenger Nicolas Errington spoke to Agnes and the Earl of Argyll. They discussed the future marriage of James VI. Agnes was in Elgin in September 1582. The laird of Kilravock sent her a gift of "butter and wild meat". An emissary from Mary, Queen of Scots, Albert Fontenay (a brother of Claude Nau) visited Scotland in August 1584. He wrote to Mary in cipher that Agnes Keith was pleased to hear his news. Fontenay liked her because she spoke of her love for Mary. However, Agnes did not now much hold sway with the present regime in Scotland.

== Death and legacy ==
In 1588, Agnes Keith rented a house in Edinburgh from Jonet Cornwell a merchant's widow. Agnes was attended in her illness by the physicians and surgeons Gilbert Primrose and John Craig and the apothecary Thomas Diksoun.

Agnes died on 16 July 1588 in Edinburgh. She was buried near her first husband in the tomb in St Giles' Cathedral. It was located in St. Anthony's aisle and the monument was carved by John Roytell and Murdoch Walker.

Her will was probated on 9 August 1591. It lists legacies and debts to several servants, including to her "gentlewoman servatrix", Marjory Gray, the Parson of Dollar, John Steill, and to Alexander Monteith, chamberlain of Campbell. Some of her clothes, including seven gowns long tailed gowns of rich fabrics were listed in a Darnaway inventory of 1575.

== Depiction in art ==
Celebrated Flemish artist Hans Eworth painted portraits of Agnes and her first husband, the Earl of Moray in 1562 to commemorate their marriage.
