= David Rizzio =

Italian courtier (1533–1566)

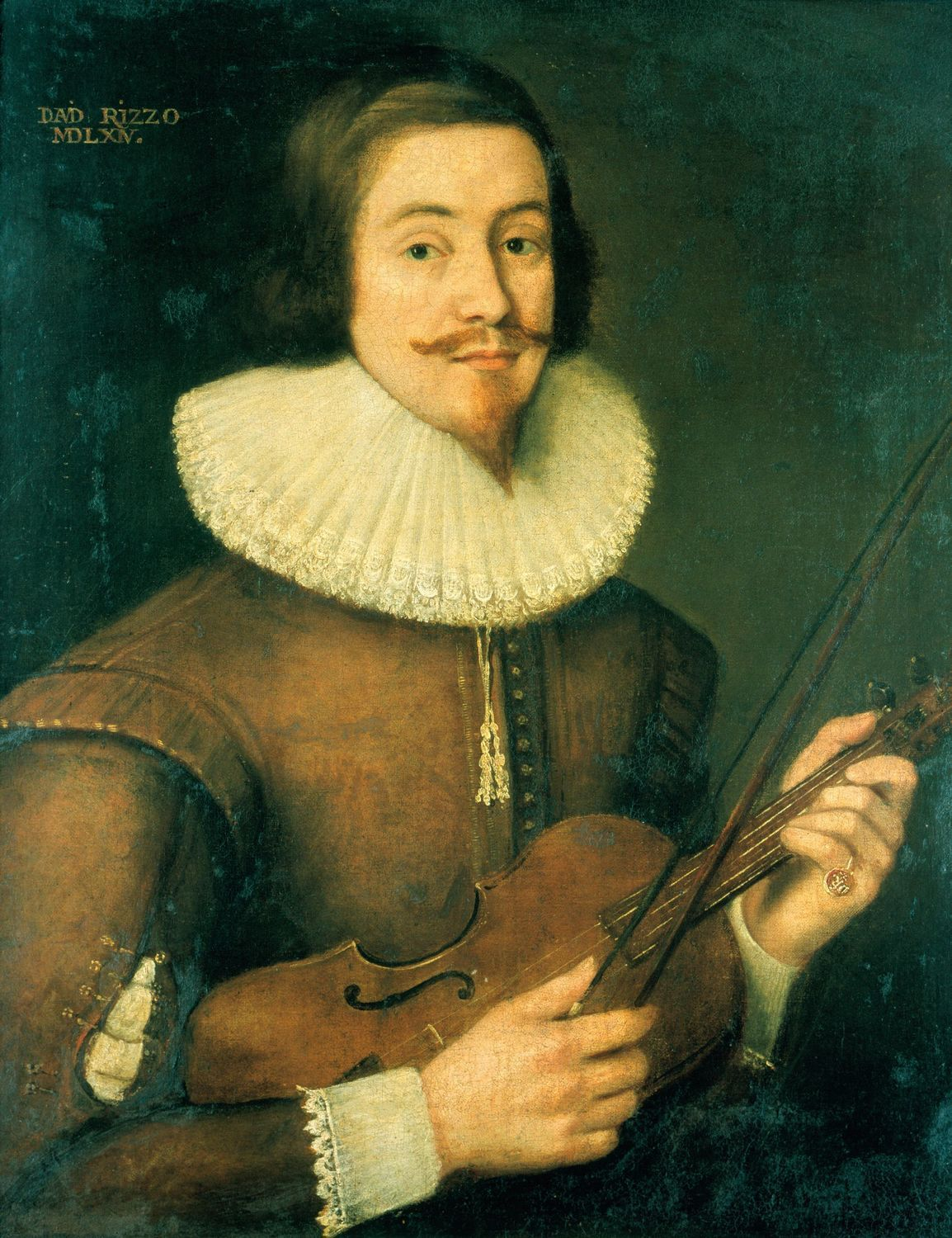
- Seventeenth-century portrait traditionally said to be of Rizzio. Contemporary accounts describe him as ugly, short and hunch-backed.
- Born: c. 1533; Pancalieri, Italy
- Died: 9 March 1566; Holyrood Palace, Edinburgh, Scotland

David Rizzio (/ˈrɪtsioʊ/ RIT-see-oh; Italian: Davide Rizzio [ˈdaːvide ˈrittsjo]; c. 1533 – 9 March 1566) or Riccio (/ˈrɪtʃioʊ/ RITCH-ee-oh, Italian: [ˈrittʃo]) was an Italian courtier and the private secretary of Mary, Queen of Scots. Mary's husband, Lord Darnley, is said to have been jealous of their friendship because of rumours that Rizzio had impregnated Mary, and he joined in a conspiracy of Protestant nobles to murder Rizzio, led by Patrick Ruthven, 3rd Lord Ruthven. Mary was having dinner with Rizzio and a few ladies-in-waiting when Darnley joined them, accused his wife of adultery and then had a group murder Rizzio, who was hiding behind Mary. Mary was held at gunpoint and Rizzio was stabbed numerous times. His body took 57 dagger wounds. The murder was the catalyst of Darnley's downfall, and had serious consequences for Mary's subsequent reign.

== Career ==
Rizzio was born in Pancalieri close to Turin, a descendant of an ancient and noble family still living in Piedmont, the Riccio Counts of San Paolo e Solbrito.

Rizzio (whose name appears in Italian records as Davide Riccio di Pancalieri in Piemonte) went first from Turin to the Court of the Duke of Savoy, then at Nice. However, finding no opportunities for advancement there, he found means in 1561 to get himself admitted into the train of Carlo Ubertino Solaro, Count of Moretta, who was about to lead an embassy to Scotland. This occurred thanks to his connections with Gerolamo della Rovere and Jean Morel— the latter being the recipient of the only extant letter written by him. The Count in Scotland had no employment for Rizzio and dismissed him. Rizzio however, had made friends with the Queen's musicians, who had come with her from France. James Melville, a friend of Rizzio, said that "Her Majesty had three valets in her chamber, who sung three parts, and wanted a bass to sing the fourth part".

Rizzio and Mary's musicians were employed as valets of her chamber and the royal accounts also call Rizzio her "chamber child". Other valets who were musicians include Adrian Lefeau, John Adesoun (who played the lute), and James Lauder. Mary bought matching clothes for three lute players in February 1562. One of the "sangstaris" was called Missall.

=== Secretary ===
Rizzio was considered a good musician and excellent singer, which brought him to the attention of the cosmopolitan young queen. Towards the end of 1564, having grown wealthy under her patronage, Rizzio became the queen's secretary for relations with France, replacing Augustine Raullet. John Lesley wrote that Rizzio was "a very able man of business" employed to write the Queen's "private letters in French, Italian, and Latin". Rizzio was ambitious, controlling access to the queen and seeing himself as almost a Secretary of State. Other courtiers felt that as a Catholic and a foreigner he was too close to the queen.

=== Relationship with Darnley and with Mary ===
Rizzio became an ally of Lord Darnley and helped with plans for his marriage to Mary. George Buchanan described Rizzio gaining Darnley's favour. As their familiarity grew, Rizzio was admitted to Darnley's chamber, bed, and secret confidence. David Calderwood later wrote that Rizzio had "insinuated himself in the favours of Lord Darnley so far, that they would lie some times in one bed together".

George Buchanan wrote about events and plots in June 1565 before the royal wedding. He claims that Mary summoned her brother, the Earl of Moray, to meet her at Perth. There, the conspirators planned to escalate a quarrel between Moray and Darnley. Then, Rizzio would strike the first blow and others would ensure Moray was killed. Thomas Randolph described this plan differently, and his version does not involve Rizzio. However, Moray did not come to Perth, but stayed at Lochleven Castle. Rumours followed that Moray and the Earl of Argyll planned to kidnap Mary and Darnley as they passed by Kinross.

Before the wedding of Mary and Darnley, Rizzio was with the couple when they walked in disguise or masque costume on Edinburgh's High Street. After the marriage in July 1565, rumours became rife that Mary was having an adulterous affair with Rizzio. It was said (in 1568) that Mary and Darnley's love decayed after they returned from the campaign against Moray's rebellion, known as the Chaseabout Raid, when Mary was "using the said David more like a lover than a servant, forsaking her husband's bed". According to the report of a French diplomat, Paul de Foix, Darnley discovered Rizzio in the closet of Mary's bedchamber at Holyrood house in the middle of the night dressed only in a fur gown over his shirt. George Buchanan included a similar story in his History, that Darnley had a key to a secondary door to Mary's bedchamber, but found it locked or barred against him. Thereafter, he resolved to be revenged on Rizzio.

Following Darnley's murder, Lord Ruthven, in the account known as Ruthven's Relation, revealed that Darnley had described the circumstances of his jealousy to Mary. This account also focusses on Rizzio's presence in Mary's bedchamber:

Since yon fellow Davie fell in credit and familiarity with your Majesty, you regarded me not, neither treated me nor entertained me after your wonted fashion; for every day before dinner, you would come to my chamber and pass time with me, and thus long time ye have not done done so; and when I come to your Majesty's chamber, you bear me little company, except Davie had been the third "marrow" [companion]: and after supper your Majesty hath a use to sit at cards with the said Davie till one or two of the clock after midnight; and this is the entertainment that I have had of you this long time.

The chronicle account, the Historie of James the Sext, tells the story in a different way, asserting that Mary's secretary, William Maitland of Lethington, was jealous of Rizzio's increasing power. Maitland made Darnley jealous of Rizzio, hoping that the naive king-consort would destroy his rival.

=== Wealth, possessions and costume ===
His annual salary for the post of valet was 150 Francs or £75 Scots. The sum was paid from the "Thirds of Benefices" as were some other household expenses, and not through the treasurer's accounts. In 1565, Rizzio received £80 Scots in four installments paid by George Wishart of Drymme, and he was paid £80 as his pension in 1566.

Mary gave him gifts of rich fabric from her wardrobe, including black velvet figured with gold and five pieces of gold cloth figured with scales. It was said that Rizzio took bribes. William Douglas of Lochleven wrote that he offered Rizzio £5,000 to prevent the forfeit of the Earl of Moray, but Rizzio refused, saying he would not act for £20,000. Rizzio's involvement with pardons for the Chaseabout rebels sparked Darnley's envy.

According to a letter of Thomas Randolph, Rizzio took part in a costumed masque in February 1566 to celebrate the arrival of Nicolas d'Angennes, seigneur de Rambouillet, who brought the Order of Saint Michael for Darnley.

Mary gave Rizzio £200 in January 1566 to refurbish his chamber at Holyrood Palace. After his murder, it was noted that Rizzio had been living in wealthy circumstances. He was said to have £2,000 Sterling in gold coins, good clothing including 18 pairs of velvet hose, and his chamber at Holyroodhouse was well-furnished with a variety of hand-guns described as daggs, pistolets, and arquebuses, besides 22 swords. He was said to be wearing a very rich jewel at his neck when he was killed and also a satin doublet and a furred damask night gown, perhaps the garment mentioned in the earlier French report.

== Murder ==
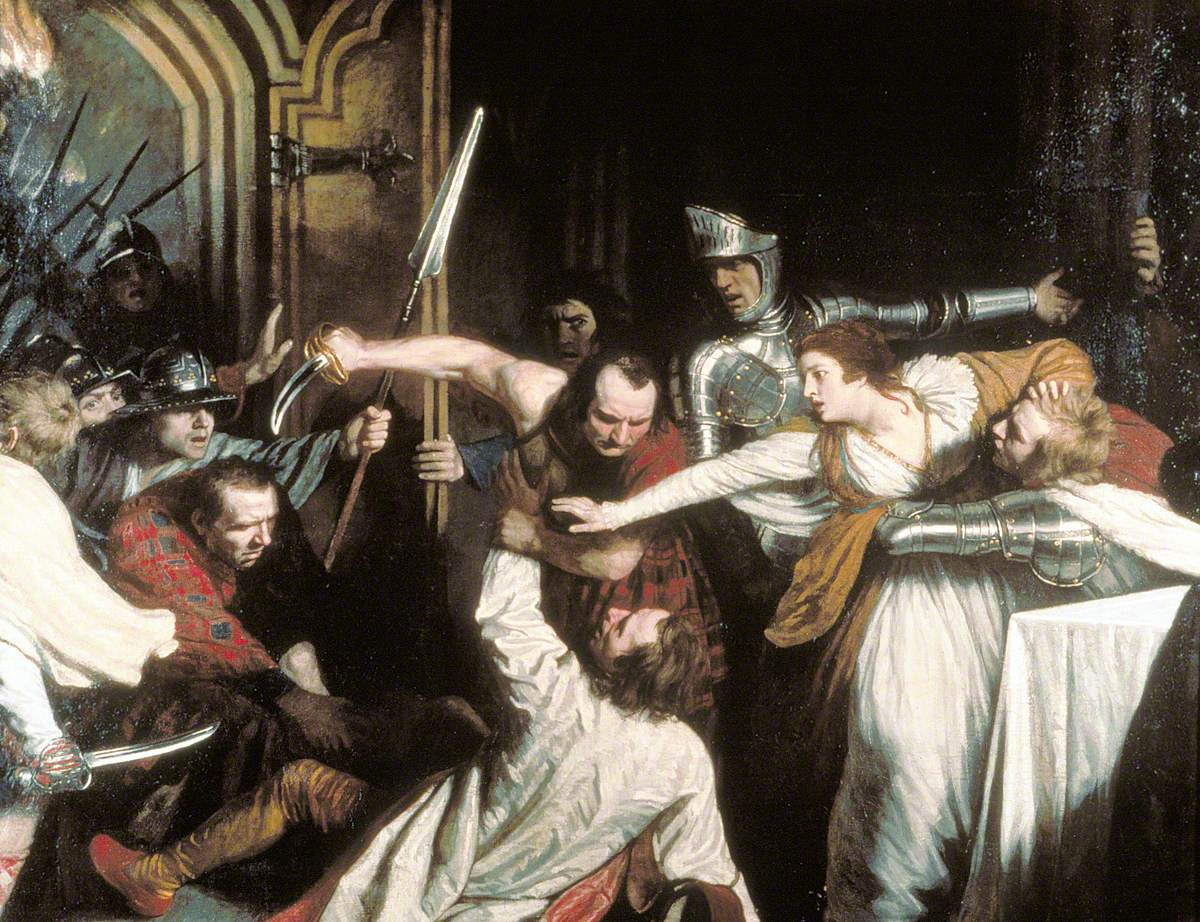
The Murder of Rizzio (John Opie, 1787)

Jealousy precipitated Rizzio's murder in the Queen's supper chamber in the Palace of Holyroodhouse at 8 o'clock on Saturday, 9 March 1566. Mary, Rizzio, Jean Stewart, Countess of Argyll, Robert Beaton of Creich and Arthur Erskine were seated at the supper table. Darnley, according to James Melville of Halhill, was leaning on Mary's chair. The supper room, which still exists as part of the bedchamber, and was then "a cabinet about XII foot square, in the same a little low reposinge bedde, and a table" according to an account of the murder written by Francis, Earl of Bedford, and Thomas Randolph. The room had been decorated by Mary's servant Servais de Condé.

On the night of the murder, the royal guards were overpowered and the palace was turned over to the control of the rebels. According to James Melville, the Earls of Bothwell and Huntly escaped from the palace by jumping from the window into the "little garden where the lions are lodged". The Queen was six months pregnant (with James VI) at the time, and some accused Rizzio of having impregnated her. The rebels burst into the supper room, led by Lord Ruthven and George Douglas, and demanded that Rizzio be handed over. The Queen refused. Rizzio then hid behind Mary, or held her about the waist, but was nevertheless seized.

Mary would allege that one of the intruders, Patrick Bellenden (brother of the Lord Justice Clerk), pointed his gun at her pregnant belly, while Andrew Ker of Faldonside threatened to stab her. Lord Ruthven denied this. Anthony Standen later wrote that Bellenden drew his dagger at the Queen's left side and Standen disarmed him, while another man had a snaphance pistol which failed to fire.

After this violent struggle, Rizzio was dragged through the bed-chamber into the adjacent audience chamber or outer hall. He was stabbed an alleged 57 times. His body was thrown down the main staircase nearby (now disused) and stripped of his jewels and fine clothes. The location of Rizzio's murder is marked with a small plaque in the Audience Chamber, underneath which is a red mark on the floorboards, which reportedly was left when Rizzio was stabbed to death.

Rizzio was first buried in the cemetery of Holyrood Abbey. Buchanan states that shortly afterwards his body was removed by the Queen's orders and deposited in the tomb of the kings of Scotland in Holyrood Abbey. This strengthened the previous rumours of her familiarity with him. Rumours circulated about the motive for the murder: that Darnley was jealous, or that powerful lords sought to manipulate Darnley and remove an irritating presence at court.

== Aftermath ==
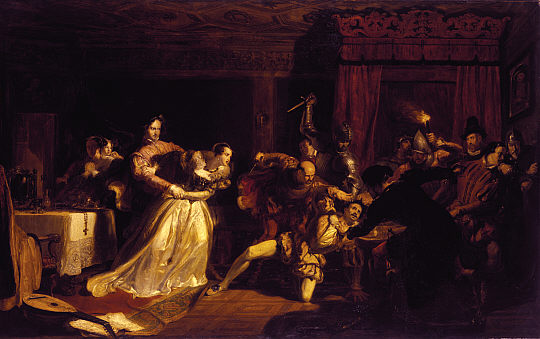
The Murder of David Rizzio by William Allan, 1833

Immediately after the murder, Mary was able to speak to Lord Darnley, and may have convinced him they were both in danger and captives in the palace. The guard around her was relaxed and at midnight the next day, they escaped, and she rode behind Arthur Erskine of Blackgrange, master of her stable, to Seton Palace and then to safety at Dunbar Castle. An English servant of Lord Darnley, Anthony Standen, later claimed to have accompanied the queen with John Stewart of Traquair and his brother William Stewart. Mary returned to Edinburgh with her supporters and took up lodgings on the Royal Mile rather than return to the palace. On 21 March, she had Darnley declared innocent of the murder.

Robert Melville arrived in Edinburgh from London and reported back to Elizabeth and Cecil on the aftermath of the murder. He noted that Morton, Lord Ruthven, Lord Lindsay, William Maitland of Lethington, the Clerk Register James Balfour, the Lord Justice Clerk John Bellenden (whose brother was alleged to have pointed a gun at the queen), and some gentlemen of Lothian, who were all suspected of having knowledge of the plan, had fled. Mary wrote to Elizabeth I asking that Ruthven, Morton, and their accomplices should be returned to Scotland from Newcastle. Elizabeth asked Sir John Forster to tell them to find refuge outside England.

William Cecil, 1st Baron Burghley, and a French diplomat, Paul de Foix, discussed the news. De Foix seems at first to have been misled about the events, thinking that Darnley had killed Rizzio because he found such a lowly servant having an adulterous relationship with Mary, an idea not present in the reports of the murder.

Two conspirators, Thomas Scott of Cambusmichael, depute-sheriff of Perth, two burgesses of Edinburgh William Harlaw, John Mowbray, and Henry Yair, a former priest, were brought to trial for their part in the murder in April 1566. They were sentenced to be hanged, drawn and quartered. Harlaw and Mowbray were pardoned. Edinburgh's burgh records show that Thomas Scott was beheaded using the newly-commissioned Maiden. The head of Thomas Scott was displayed on a tower of Holyrood Palace and the head of Henry Yair was placed on the Netherbow Gate on the High Street.

Rizzio's brother, Joseph, arrived in Scotland with Michel de Castelnau and was appointed secretary in David's place by 25 April 1566. Joseph and an Italian colleague, Joseph Lutyni, had some trouble over coins taken from the queen's purse, and in April 1567, he was accused and acquitted with Bothwell of Darnley's murder. Castelnau brought letters for Darnley, and he wrote to Catherine de' Medici to thank her, taking the opportunity to insist he was innocent of the "horrible crime".

== Legacy and memorials ==
David Rizzio's career was remembered and referred to by Henry IV of France. Mocking the pretension of James VI of Scotland to be the "Scottish Solomon", he remarked that "he hoped he was not David the fiddler's son", alluding to the possibility that Rizzio, not Darnley, fathered King James. According to the Master of Gray, James wept with his friend Cuthbert Armourer over the rumours that Rizzio was his father.

George Buchanan wrote in 1581 that David was first buried outside the door of Holyrood Abbey, and then Mary arranged for him to be buried in the tomb of her father James V and Madeleine of France within. Buchanan described this circumstance as reflecting badly on the Queen. Fearing that Mary's son, James VI, would suppress his book, Buchanan's friend James Melville tried to get Buchanan to rewrite the passage while the book was at the printers. Buchanan asked his cousin, Thomas Buchanan, a schoolmaster in Stirling, if he thought the story was true, and the cousin agreed. The story was published.

It is sometimes said that Rizzio was buried at the Canongate Kirk and burying ground. Holyroodhouse is within the old Canongate jurisdiction, and Rizzio's death was recorded in the Canongate registers. This pre-dated the building of the Canongate Kirk in 1688, and it is unlikely he could be buried there.

In 2026, a public square in the commune of Moretta, close to Rizzio's birthplace in Pancalieri, was renamed Piazzetta David Rizzio in his honour.

== Representation in fiction ==
Rizzio was played by John Carradine in the 1936 RKO picture Mary of Scotland; by Ian Holm in the 1971 movie Mary, Queen of Scots; by Tadeusz Pasternak in the BBC mini-series Gunpowder, Treason, and Plot; by Andrew Shaver in The CW network television show Reign; and by Ismael Cruz Córdova in the 2018 film Mary Queen of Scots.

The murder of Rizzio and the subsequent downfall of Darnley form the main subject of the 1830 play Maria Stuart by Juliusz Słowacki.

Rizzio's life and death are a key plot element in Caleb Carr's Sherlock Holmes story The Italian Secretary, Holmes vocally dismissing the idea that Rizzio was ever anything more than entertainment.

Arthur Conan Doyle used the death of Rizzio as a plot point in his 1908 story, “The Silver Mirror”.

Rizzio's murder is also the subject of Scottish author Denise Mina's 2021 novella, "Rizzio".

== The takers in hand ==
Thomas Randolph listed these men among the participants and suspected conspirators in Rizzio's murder:

- Earl of Morton
- Patrick Ruthven, 3rd Lord Ruthven
- Patrick Lindsay, 6th Lord Lindsay
- Master of Ruthven
- William Maitland of Lethington
- James MacGill of Nether Rankeillour, Clerk of the Register
- John Bellenden, Justice Clerk
- James Stewart, Abbot of Inchcolm
- Adam Erskine, Commendator of Cambuskenneth
- John Cunningham of Drumquhassle
- The laird of Balvaird
- William Douglas, laird of Lochleven
- Andrew Kerr of Fawdonsyde, son-in-law of John Knox
- James Johnston of Elphinstone
- William Lauder of Haltoun
- John Cockburn of Ormiston
- James Sandilands of Calder
- John Crichton, laird of Brunstane
- Patrick Bellenden of Stenhouse.
- William Douglas of Whittingehame
- Patrick Murray of Tibbermore
- The laird of Carmichael
- Andrew Cunningham, son of the Earl of Glencairn
- Archibald Douglas
- George Douglas, said to be an uncle of Lord Darnley
- Alexander Ruthven, brother of Lord Ruthven

On 19 March, the Privy Council sent letters summoning several men who were suspected of involvement, requiring they attend in Edinburgh to answer questions and charges. These included those in Randolph's list and others such as William Tweedie of Drummelzier, Adam Tweedy of Drava, and John Somerville of Cambusnethan.

On 8 June, the Queen's advocates John Spens of Condie and Robert Crichton of Eliock proclaimed some the suspects were rebels and had fled. It would be unlawful to help them. The lawyers included the names of some Edinburgh craftsmen, William Jonston, a bow maker, a shoemaker Thomas Broun, and the cutler James Young who made sword blades.

John Carmichael of Meadowflat, later Captain of Crawford, was given a remission or pardon in 1574 for his "art and part" in the detention of Mary at Holyrood from the 9 to 11 March 1566.

== Sources ==
- Ruthen, Lord (1815). Some Particulars of the Life of David Riccio, chief favourite of Mary Queen of Scots. London: Triphook.
- The Register of the Privy Council of Scotland, edited by John Hill Burton, LL.D., vol.1. 1545–1569, Edinburgh, 1877, p. 437, lists all those charged with "the slauchter of David Riccio." Given the very many names shown, it presumably includes those in the wider conspiracy.
- Hawkins, Sir John (1778). History and Character of Scots Music, including Anecdotes of the Celebrated David Rizzio. Universal Magazine, October 1778.
- Weir, Alison (2008) [2003]. Mary, Queen of Scots and the Murder of Lord Darnley. London: Random House. ISBN 978-0-09-952707-7.
