= James Lauder (musician) =

Scottish musician

James Lauder was a Scottish musician who worked for Mary, Queen of Scots and James VI.

== Career ==
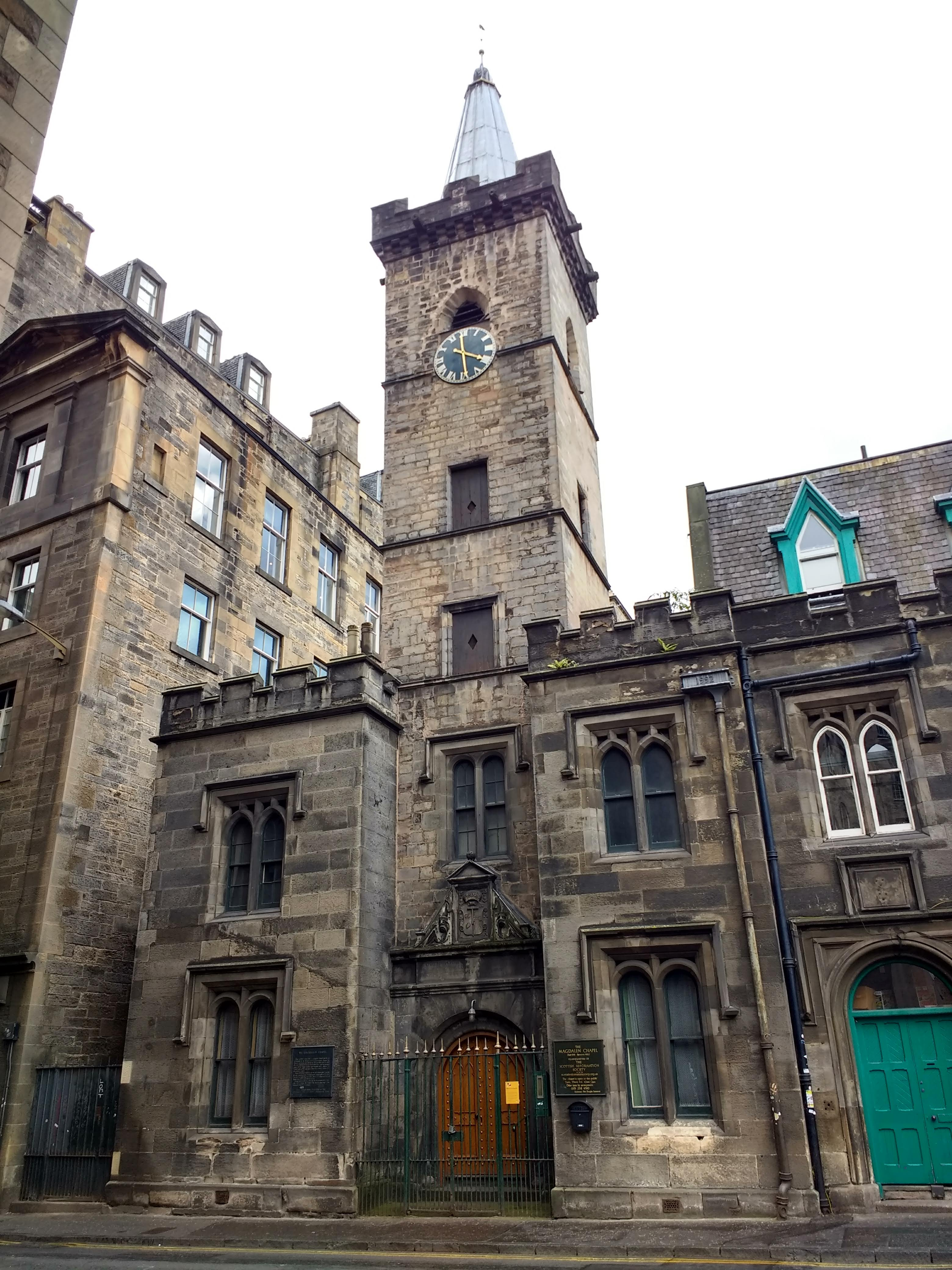
James Lauder's family were early benefactors of Edinburgh's Magdalen Chapel

James Lauder was a member of the Lauder of Bass family, and a relation of Gilbert Lauder, a burgess of Edinburgh, and his wife Isobel MacQuhen or Mauchane. They were benefactors of Edinburgh's Magdalen Chapel, and their son Henry Lauder of St Germains was an advocate to Mary of Guise.

James Lauder was first employed by the burgh council of Edinburgh as a musician at St Giles. In 1552, he was allowed to travel to England and France for a year to further his musical education.

Lauder joined the household of Mary, Queen of Scots in 1562, and was granted a yearly fee of £100 Scots paid in three terms and a pension as a valet of the queen's chamber. John Adesoun, a lute player, and David Rizzio received payments on the same basis. An account of pensions paid in 1564 reads "deliverit to James Lawder, ane of the varlettis of the quenis majesties chalmer for his witsonday terme of lxiiij yeirs [1564] of his pensione and fee the sowme of ane hundreth twentye fyve punds". A household roll of 1566 lists "Jacques", who played the lute. Helen Mennie Shire suggested a payment of £20 to Lauder in November 1562 may have reciprocated a gift of a piece of music to the queen.

Mary granted James Lauder the musician, specified as her valet, two "escheats" as rewards. In November 1565, he was granted the property of David Monypenny who was a rebel at the Chaseabout Raid, and in May 1566, the gift of the property of William Lauder, a son of Robert Lauder of the Bass and Jonet Ker. William Lauder had defaulted on payments due to the Earl of Bothwell from a property at Cleghorn. In August 1566, she appointed a James Lauder, "son of Gilbert Lauder, burgess of Edinburgh", to be a chaplain of the altar of St Nicholas in St Giles after William MacDowall. The position had been held in 1532 by a priest Gilbert Lauder who granted a charter to the merchant Gilbert Lauder and his wife Isobel Mauchane. It is not clear if the chaplaincy was granted to the same person as the valet.

After Mary, Queen of Scots, fled to England in 1568, Lauder joined her household and was listed as a vallet de chambre at Tutbury Castle in 1569. He was described as a groom of the chamber and musician in English lists of the household.

Mary sent him with Alexander Bog (formerly a porter at Holyrood Palace) to Scotland with her letters in January 1570. Although they had passports from Elizabeth I, they were detained by the Earl of Sussex, Lord President of the North, in reaction to the assassination of Regent Moray. They were allowed to travel on to Scotland in April. They brought Mary's gift of a hackney horse for James VI and its graith, the horse harness and saddle, and his first doublet and long hose, and a writing primer, as well as a number of letters for her "faithful subjects". Mary described the gift in her letter to Annabell Murray, Countess of Mar at Stirling Castle. She may have intended that Lauder would become James's music teacher, but wrote that the two bearers of her letter would "vesey" her son to report on his progress. It is not clear if Lauder and Bog were allowed to present Mary's gifts to James VI.

In September 1571, James Lauder carried a letter from Mary's supporters in Edinburgh Castle to an English courier at Cowthally Castle. In March 1576, Mary asked Réné Dolu, a treasurer of her French estates, to pay him 200 livres for his pension.

As a musician in the household of James VI, in 1580 he was sent to London to buy a pair of virginals for James VI. He still expected payment of his pension from Mary.

In August 1584, the French diplomat Albert Fontenay stayed in Lauder's house in Edinburgh. Fontenay described James VI in a letter to Claude Nau and claimed that he disliked and avoided the courtly arts of dance and music.

James Lauder was still a member of the royal household in the 1590s. In 1593, he examined the competency of John Chalmers as player of the virginals.

A collection of Scottish music includes a dance "My Lord of Marche paven set be James Lawder, set 1584". Written for Robert Stewart, Earl of March, according to Claire van Kampen the music has a "melancholic and sombre nature". The poet Alexander Montgomerie made a sonnet for Lauder. The line I wald se mare serves as an anagram for "Iames lawder".

== Family ==
James Lauder was married to Jean Hay (died 1614), they had seven children. He had a son, possibly from another relationship, John Lauder, who was a member of Mary's household in 1571 and in the 1580s at Sheffield Castle and Sheffield Manor Lodge. John played the bass viol and was described as a pantry servant. James Lauder wrote to his son John about payments from Mary and mentioned another court musician William Kinloch. In 1584, James Lauder asked Fontenay to recommend that his son be made a valet of Mary's chamber.
