= Wedding of Mary, Queen of Scots, and Henry Stuart, Lord Darnley =

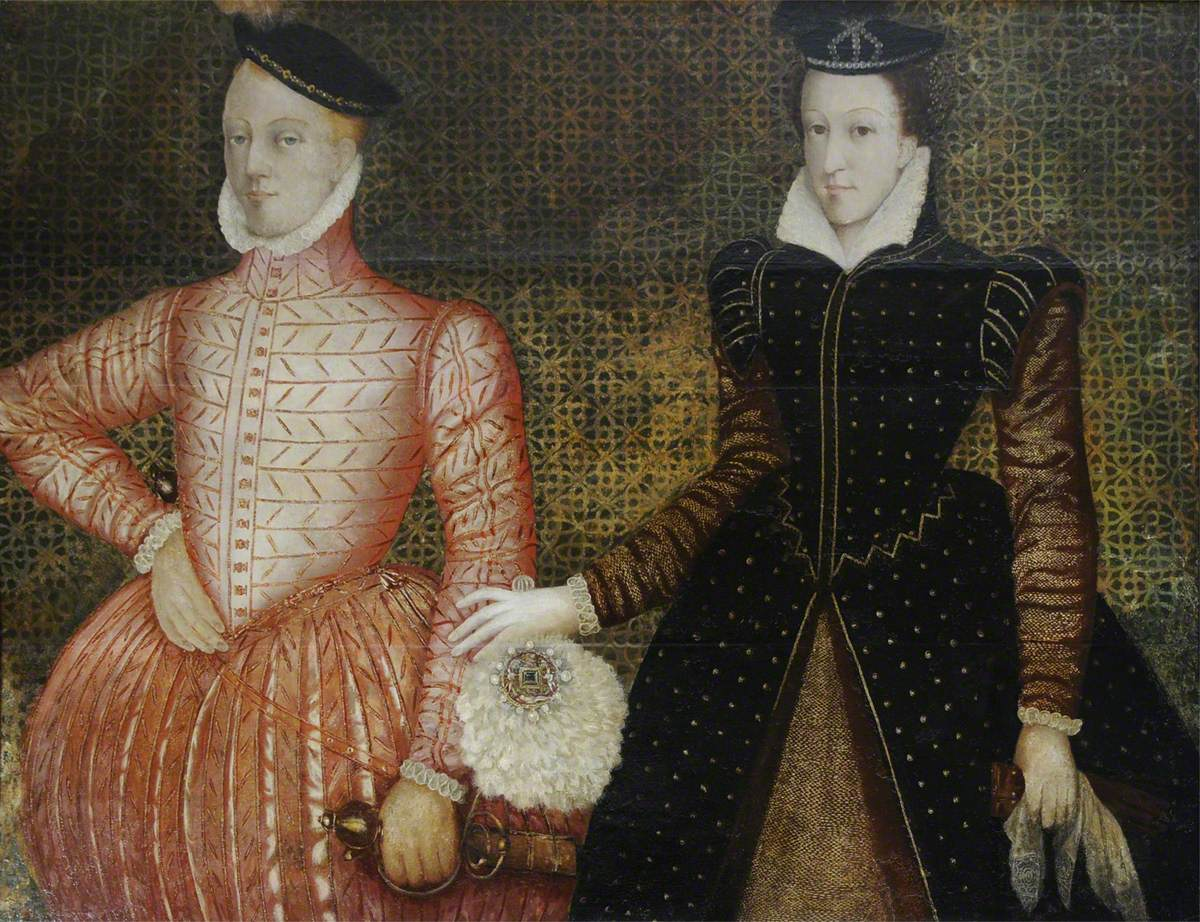
Mary, Queen of Scots, and Henry Stuart, Lord Darnley, double portrait, Hardwick Hall, National Trust.

Mary, Queen of Scots, and Henry Stuart, Lord Darnley, were married at the Palace of Holyroodhouse on 29 July 1565, when she was 22 years old, and he was 19. The wedding took place in the Chapel Royal. The two were first cousins. The marriage lasted less than two years, less than Mary's first marriage to Francis, Dauphin of France. The two would have one son, James I of England.

== Background ==
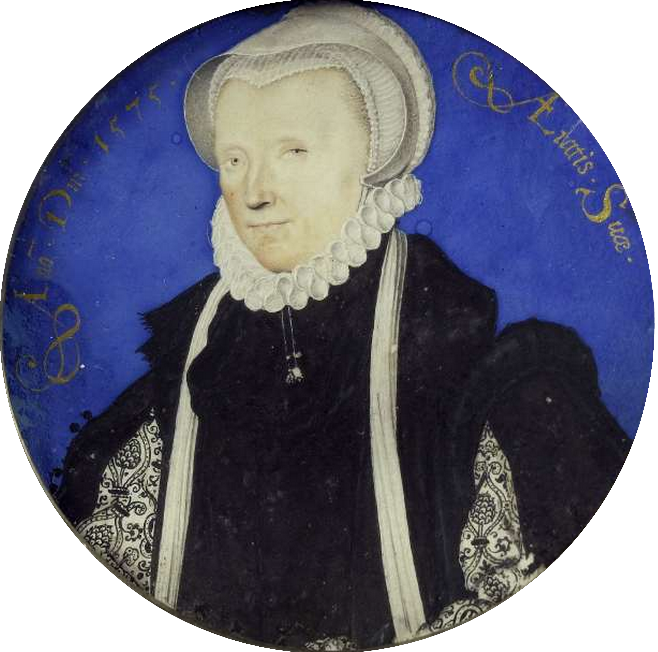
Darnley's mother Margaret Douglas was imprisoned in the Tower of London by order of the Privy Council of England for her son's wedding

Mary, Queen of Scots had married Francis II of France at Notre-Dame de Paris on 24 April 1558, and, after his death, she returned to Scotland to rule in person in September 1561. Henry Stuart, Lord Darnley, who had been brought up in England, was the son of Matthew Stewart, 4th Earl of Lennox and Lady Margaret Douglas, and a grandson of Margaret Tudor.

Darnley's mother was keen to advance a dynastic marriage, and sent her son's tutor Arthur Lallart or Lilliard to meet Mary. Darnley's uncle, the Earl of Sutherland, helped him gain access to Queen Mary. Lallart met her at Stirling Castle on 15 September 1561 before she rode to Kincardine and Perth. Mary conferred with Lallart while walking up and down her chamber, and sat on a coffer to discuss Darnley's qualities and ability. Lallart also discussed the Countess' Scottish lands with Mary, and was accompanied by one of Lennox's falconers. Another servant of the Lennoxes, Thomas Fowler, was also credited with bringing Lord Darnley to Scotland.

Mary, Queen of Scots, considered marrying the Spanish prince, Carlos, Prince of Asturias, known as Don Carlos. Philip II of Spain decided not to allow this match. Lennox was restored to his Scottish estates by Parliament, and by a ceremony and proclamation made at Edinburgh's Mercat Cross by William Stewart of Luthrie. Darnley came to Scotland and met Mary at Wemyss Castle in February 1565.

Darnley was shown increasing favour at court. When he fell ill with measles in April, he was lodged and nursed at Stirling Castle, where he played games, teamed with Mary, against Mary Beaton and the English diplomat Thomas Randolph. In May 1565, Mary ordered the cleaning of the king's lodgings at Holyrood Palace and the construction of a site in Holyrood Park for picnics or banqueting. Mary's French uncle, the Cardinal of Lorraine, criticised Darnley as an amiable fool, literally a young chicken, "un gentil huteaudeau".

Mary sent William Maitland of Lethington to Elizabeth I with news of her marriage plan, and Nicholas Throckmorton was sent to Edinburgh to convey her "miscontentment". Elizabeth I suggested Mary should marry the English courtier Robert Dudley, 1st Earl of Leicester. As it became clear that Mary intended to marry Darnley, Elizabeth regretted allowing him and his father to travel to Scotland, and on 18 June 1565 she requested their return.

On 14 June 1565, Mary and her advisors at Perth composed a protest at Elizabeth's complaint at her marriage plans and her treatment of Lady Margaret Douglas to be delivered by her diplomat and master of requests John Hay, Commendator of Balmerino. Elizabeth sent Lady Margaret Douglas from house arrest at Whitehall to the Tower of London. During her time in the Tower, a servant carved an inscription or graffiti in her lodging that Margaret Douglas was "commytted prysner to thys lodgyng for the marrege of her sonne".

George Buchanan, and a later writer, David Calderwood, described discussions amongst the nobility in Scotland at Stirling about Mary choosing a second husband. Some argued that an ordinary woman may choose a husband, but Mary ought not to choose a King for the whole people of Scotland. Calderwood and Buchanan wrote that witches in England and Scotland had made a prophecy that a marriage before the end of July would reap a great benefit.

=== Rumours of a kidnap ===
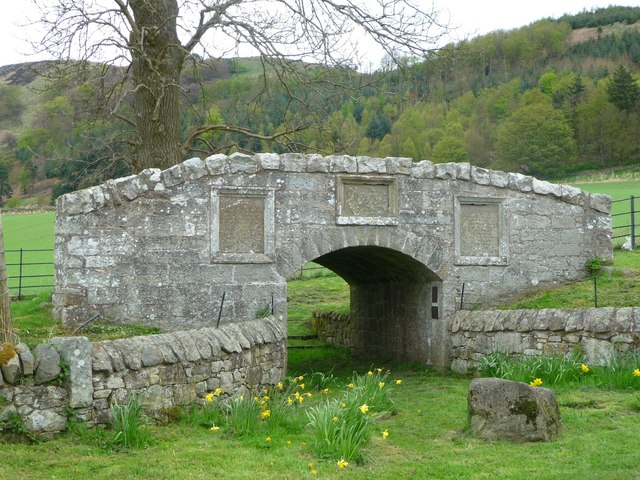
Parenwell Bridge, a 19th-century monument to events in June 1565.

There were rumours of a plot in June 1565 to prevent the marriage. Mary had summoned the nobility to Perth, but many gave excuses and James Stewart, 1st Earl of Moray, did not come.

Mary and Darnley were said to have been at risk of kidnap by the Earls of Argyll and Moray as they travelled from Perth to Edinburgh. Darnley would be taken to Argyll's Castle Campbell. The kidnap would occur during a visit to Callendar House near Falkirk, at the Path of Dron at the Ochils, at Beath (the plot was known as the "Raid of Beath"), or according to Robert Lindsay of Pitscottie the Earl of Rothes would capture them at the "Parrat-Well beside Dowhill" near Kinross.

The English ambassador Thomas Randolph reported to William Cecil that some had mooted the idea of returning Darnley and his father, the Earl of Lennox, to England at Berwick-upon-Tweed. In his next letter, he wrote that Mary had been informed of the kidnap plot while she was at Perth. She passed through Kinross at speed accompanied only by three of her gentlewomen. Moray was at Lochleven Castle with his mother and brother, recovering from an illness. Argyll travelled from Castle Campbell, expecting to meet Mary and have dinner with her, but arriving after she had gone by. The suggestion was that the conspiracy was a rumour spread by the queen's party to discredit Moray and Argyll.

Randolph heard that a quarrel between Moray's servants and the Captain of her guard, James Stewart, could have been escalated at Perth to a conflict in which Moray would be killed. On 15 July 1565, Mary summoned Moray to discuss the rumours or counter-claims, that he and Argyll claimed her supporters at Perth had conspired "in the back gallery of her highness' lodging" to assassinate Moray. Mary and the Privy Council viewed this as a slander. Moray did not appear, and this is regarded as the beginning of his rebellion, the Chaseabout Raid.

In November 1565, in a letter to the French diplomat Paul de Foix, Mary accused Moray of planning to kidnap her between Perth and Edinburgh before her wedding, and conspiring to murder Darnley and Lennox. The rumour resurfaced in 1571 as a criticism of John Knox. A later account of the conspiracy by Adam Blackwood, has the plotters plan to capture the royal couple en route at a church near Loch Leven and taken to Lochleven Castle. Blackwood says the kidnap was delayed by the absence of the Earl of Argyll, and Patrick Lindsay, laird of Dowhill warned the queen about the conspiracy. The incident, although its detail is obscure, is commemorated at Parnwell or Parenwell Bridge, built by William Adam of Blair Adam, three miles from Kinross.

== New titles for Darnley ==
Before the wedding, Darnley was made a knight, Lord of Ardmanoch and Earl of Ross at Stirling Castle on 15 May 1565. An entourage of 15 men were knighted, including Robert Stewart of Strathdon, Robert Drummond of Carnock, James Stewart of Doune, William Murray of Tullibardine, and James Home of Coldenknowes. On 22 July, Darnley was made Duke of Albany in Holyrood Abbey.

The Banns of marriage were read in St Giles on 23 July. Darnley was proclaimed king of Scotland on 28 July.

== Preparations at Holyrood Palace ==
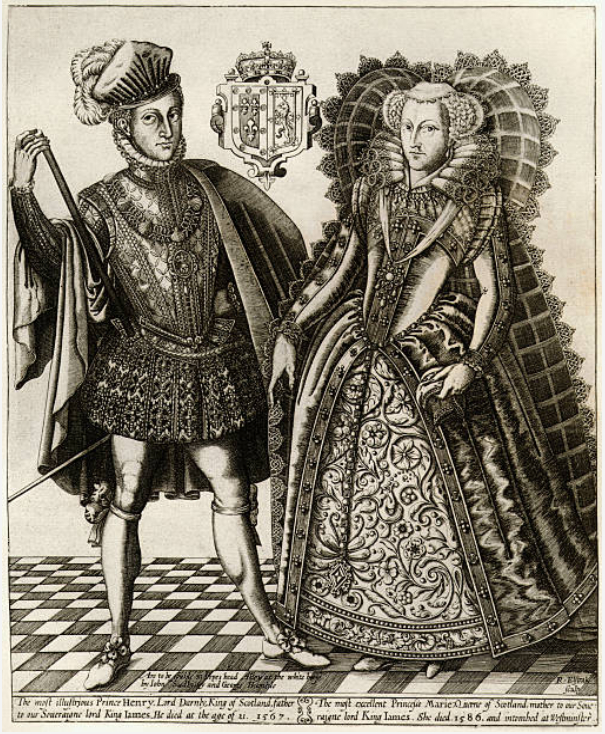
Engraving of Mary and Darnley made in 1603

Mary's wardrobe account mentions some preparations at Holyrood for the wedding. Servais de Condé dressed the chapel with an altar frontal, a corporal in a red velvet case, a red velvet chasuble and stole, and a velvet throw and two red "crammosy" velvet cushions stuffed with feathers for the couple to kneel on. The wedding took place in the chapel of the palace, now demolished and known only by a plan made in 1663, and not in the church of Holyrood Abbey.

Extra seating was provided in the queen's chamber, with two folding stools and three low stools, covered with red "crammosy" velvet. The stools were old and had belonged to Mary's parents. The queen's chamber was almost certainly the surviving bedchamber in the tower built by her father, James V of Scotland. Two sleeveless cloth of gold coats or tabards were used by Darnley's attendants. Some clothes were made for Lord Darnley in July and a bed was made up for his English equerry Anthony Standen.

== A wedding of red and black ==
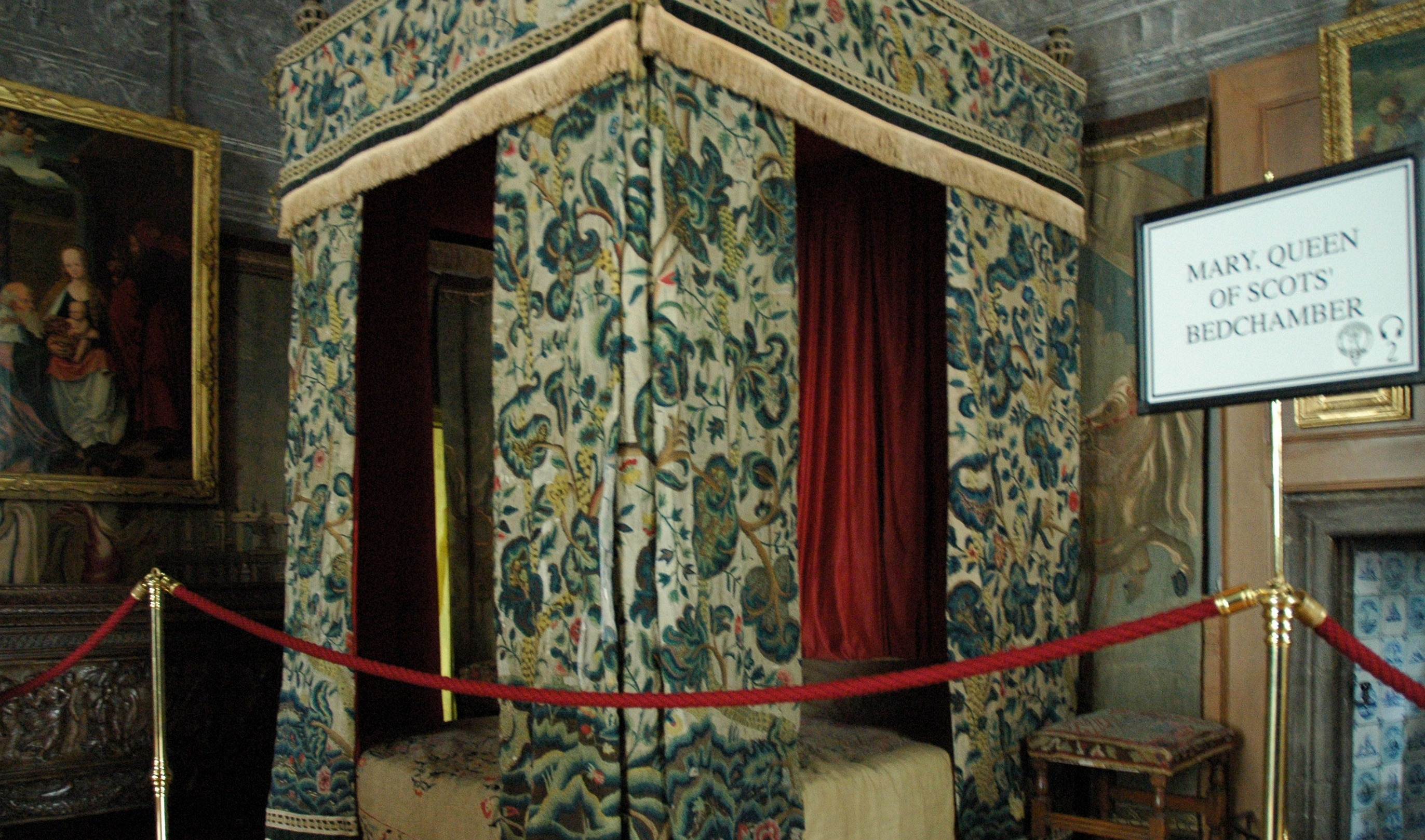
After the wedding, before dinner, Mary's mourning clothes were unpinned by her male sponsors in her chamber at Holyrood Palace, and her ladies dressed her anew.

At night, on the day before the wedding, a proclamation was made in Mary's name that Darnley would "be named and styled King of this our Kingdom". The issue of Darnley's title would cause problems.

The ceremony on Sunday 29 July 1565 was conducted by John Sinclair, Dean of Restalrig. Details of the wedding are known from a report written by the English diplomat Thomas Randolph for the Earl of Leicester. Mary went to the palace chapel early in the morning dressed in black mourning clothes (for her late husband, Francis II), escorted by the Earl of Lennox and the Earl of Atholl. She waited until the same lords brought Darnley to the chapel. The marriage banns were read for the third time. Three rings were put on her finger, the middle ring was set with a rich diamond. This seems to be the "spousing ring" which was "enamelled red". They kneeled for the ceremony, which was led by John Sinclair, Parson of Restalrig.

Afterwards, or later in the day, Darnley went first to the bedchamber. Mary came after him. She changed out of her mourning clothes, and according to Randolph, each of the men took a pin from her mourning gown. Randolph wrote that the mourning clothes were black, not the white deuil blanc seen in Mary's portraits, and he explained that Mary was obliged by the solemnity of this wedding to change out of the mourning clothes for her first husband:

She had on her backe the greate murning gowne of blacke, with the greate wyde murning hood, not unlyke unto that whiche she woore the deulfull daye of the buriall of her husbonde ... there [in her chamber] beinge required according to the solemnitie to off her care, and leave asyde these sorrowful garments, and geve herself to ane pleasanter lyf, after some prettie refusall, more I beleve for maner sake than greef of harte, she suffreth them that stood by, every man that could approve, to tayke owte a pyne, and so being committed unto her ladies, changed her garments.

Her ladies dressed her in other clothes. Pins were again bought for the "Queen's dule" mourning clothes after the death of Darnley. They went to dinner, and trumpets sounded. The married couple threw coins and tokens as largesse to the crowd. They were seated together at the same table in the great hall (which signified equal status). Randolph listed the lords who served the couple at the wedding banquets. Mary's "sewer" or napkin-bearer was the Earl of Atholl, her carver the Earl of Morton, the Earl of Crawford cupbearer. Darnley's sewer was the Earl of Eglinton, the Earl of Cassilis carver, and the Earl of Glencairn cupbearer.

After the dinner there was dancing, then supper, and then more dancing, "and so theie go to bedde". Randolph mentioned a rumour that Mary and Darnley had already slept together and "knewe eache other" before their wedding, but thought the likelihood was "greatly to the contrary".

The gunners in Edinburgh Castle were given £10 Scots to fire salutes on the day. The ceremony was Catholic, but Randolph reported that Darnley did not attend the Mass, and continued afterwards to attend services at St Giles. John Knox wrote that Darnley went to his "pastime" (hunting with a hawk) after the wedding while the queen went to the Mass. He said the dancing and banqueting went on for three or four days.

== Masques and theatre ==
The entertainment included masques written by George Buchanan, known as the Pompa Deorum in Nuptiis Mariae and the Pompae Equestres, which survive as short Latin verses. Introduced by the Muses, a court of classical gods and goddesses heard the complaint of chaste Diana that one of her band of Five Marys had been taken away from her by marriage. Mary will be wed anew.

The Pompae Equestres involved the arrival of teams of exotic visitors, tournament knights, pledging their service to Mary, including actors representing Ethiopian or Libyan knights, who declared that Mary's fame exceeded other monarchs to the same degree as the difference of their colour (Fama tui reges tanto super altior omnes, Quam tuus a nostro dissidet ore color). The teams of Ethiopian knights offered to serve her with their hands and the Northern knights offered their minds. The knights carrying the emblems of wise Pallas Minerva would overcome the knights of rash Cupid. This idea of service to the queen was again performed by blackface actors during the Royal Entry of Anne of Denmark in May 1590, as described by the poet John Burrell.

In another masque, the queen's "Four Marys", Mary Seton, Mary Beaton, Mary Fleming and Mary Livingston, saluted the Goddess of Health, Salus, in favour of Mary's continued well-being, with Buchanan's Ad Salutem in Nuptiis Reginae. The Latin verse with its themes of return and recuperation can be translated:

Kind Goddess, Health, four nymphs their voices raise,
To welcome thy return and sing thy praise,
To beg as supplicants that thou wouldst deign,
To smile benignly on their Queen again,
And make her royal breast thy hallowed shrine,
Where best and worthiest worship may be thine.

Knox and Randolph were not eyewitnesses. Randolph could not attend, because his presence as English ambassador would signal approval. Mary is said to have tried to invite him to the banquet, suggesting he might dance with Mary Beaton. In his letter describing the day, Randolph wrote that "after the marriage followeth commonly cheer and dancing", and that "after dinner they dance awhile", and "some dancing there was, and so they go they bed".

Some of the poetry collected in the Bannatyne Manuscript can be connected with the wedding or the period of courtship. A lawyer, Thomas Craig published a Latin epithalamium.

== Aftermath ==
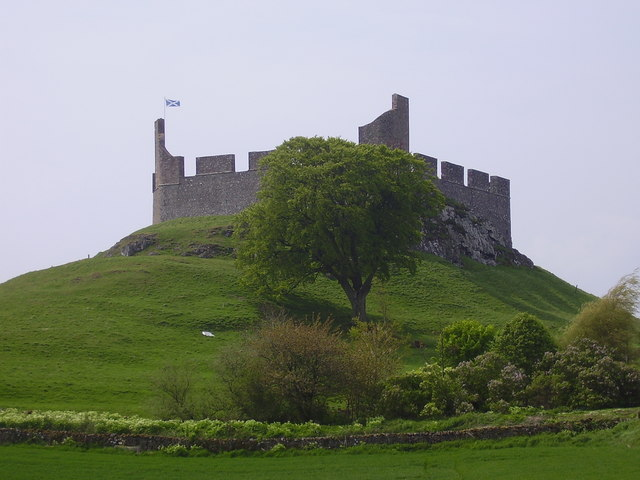
Elizabeth's diplomat John Tamworth was abducted and imprisoned at Hume Castle

Because Mary and Darnley were cousins, they needed a dispensation from the Pope to marry as Catholics. This was not obtained until September. Mary may have wished to have the wedding in July, as soon as possible, believing that the dispensation was in process or a formality, and knowing of increasing opposition to her marriage plans in England and in Scotland. The issue of the dispensation was raised during the interrogation of Thomas Strange alias Hungerford, a Jesuit captured on his way to Hindlip Hall in November 1605.

Elizabeth was not at all pleased by the marriage plans in 1565, and while playing a game of chess she spoke to the French diplomat Paul de Foix of her fury. They discussed Darnley as her pawn. Elizabeth sent a diplomat, John Tamworth or Thomworth, to negotiate with Mary. He was to tell her that she seemed to be guided by "sinister advice". Mary asked him to request that Elizabeth release her mother-in-law Lady Margaret Douglas, Countess of Lennox, from the Tower of London. The unfortunate diplomat was threatened by swordsmen in Edinburgh and then detained at Hume Castle. In London, a French diplomat Nicholas d'Angennes, seigneur de Rambouillet requested the release of Margaret Douglas, joined by a Scottish envoy, Robert Melville.

Mary's half-brother, James Stewart, Earl of Moray, was unhappy at the match, and, before Tamworth arrived in Edinburgh, his allies joined him in an unsuccessful rebellion known as the "Chaseabout Raid". Mary discussed her response to the crisis with a French diplomat Michel de Castelnau, and led her troops to the west of Scotland.

Troubles and contention between Mary and Darnley included his status, in January 1566, it was said "he presseth enrnestlye for the Matrimoniall Croune, which she is loothe hastilye to graunte". Mary sent Robert Melville to Elizabeth in February 1566 to request the release of Margaret Douglas, Countess of Lennox.

== Rizzio and a rumour of a wedding at Stirling Castle ==
An Italian newsletter, written in 1566 for Cosimo I de' Medici, Grand Duke of Tuscany, describes a secret wedding of Mary and Darnley. The Catholic ceremony was supposed to have taken place at Stirling Castle, in the bedchamber of David Rizzio. The newsletter places the marriage in April 1565, when Mary was at Stirling. Randolph mentions that Rizzio actively supported the marriage plan. James Melville of Halhill mentions the Holyrood wedding and wrote that Rizzio was Darnley's "great friend" and had helped forward his marriage plans, "wherein Seigneur Davie was na small instrument".

George Buchanan also described Rizzio gaining Darnley's confidence, and that as their familiarity grew he was admitted to his chamber, bed, and secret confidence. David Calderwood later wrote that Rizzio had "insinuated himself in the favours of Lord Darnley so far, that they would lie some times in one bed together". The rumour of a marriage in April may be related to an event at Stirling described by Thomas Randolph: Mary summoned the Earl of Moray and asked him to sign a band in favour of her marriage to Darnley.

Randolph heard a false story that Mary and Darnley had married in secret on 9 July at Holyrood, and, after the wedding, went to Seton Palace, the home of George Seton, 7th Lord Seton. When Mary returned to Edinburgh, she promenaded on the High Street in disguise with Darnley, Rizzio, old Lady Seton, and others.

== Red wedding ring ==
Mary's son, James VI and I, was born on 19 June 1566. During her pregnancy, Mary made a will and left a diamond ring with red enamel, her spousing ring, to Darnley in the event of her death. Darnley was killed in an explosion on 10 February 1567. Mary married her third husband, James Hepburn, 4th Earl of Bothwell, on 15 May 1567 at Holyrood. In 1571, during the Marian Civil War, her "marriage ring" was used as a token by the political intriguer Archibald Douglas.
