= Chaseabout Raid =

1565 rebellion by James Stewart against Mary Queen of Scots

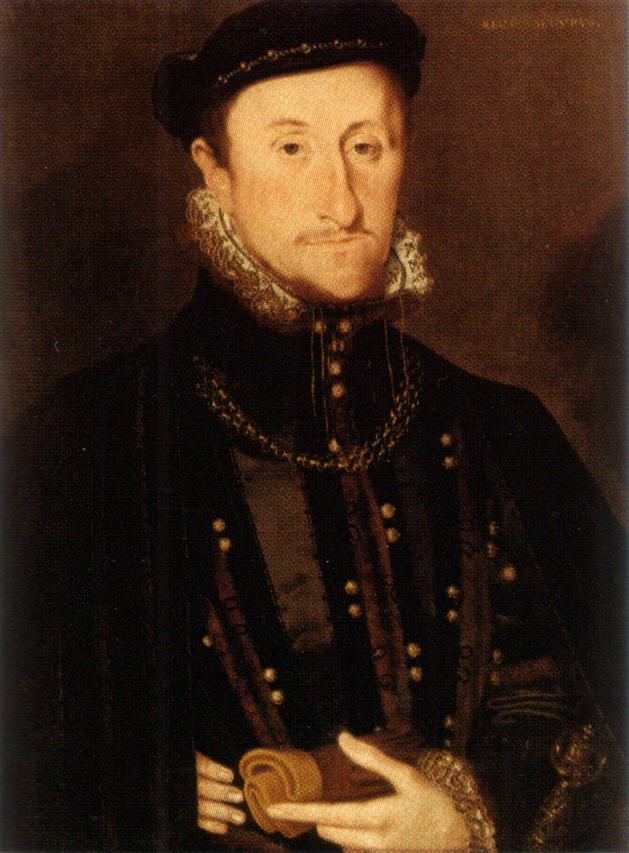
- The 1st Earl of Moray.
Date	1565
Location	Lowlands of Scotland
Result	Government victory

Belligerents
(Kingdom of Scotland) Scottish Government	Protestant rebels

Commanders and leaders
Mary, Queen of Scots	Earl of Moray

Strength
Unknown	Unknown

Casualties and losses
Unknown	Unknown

The Chaseabout Raid was a 1565 rebellion by James Stewart, 1st Earl of Moray, against his half sister, Mary, Queen of Scots, over her marriage to Henry Stuart, Lord Darnley. The rebels also claimed to be acting over other causes including bad governance, and religion in the name of the Scottish Reformation. As the government and rebel forces moved back and forth across Scotland without fighting, the conflict became known as the "chase about raid." Queen Mary's forces were superior and the rebel lords fled to England where Queen Elizabeth censured the leader.

== Background ==
There were fears that Mary's marriage to Darnley signaled a return to Roman Catholicism. Moray is reported to have declared that he aimed at nothing else than "the maintenance of the true religion."

The group of nobles and lairds opposing the wedding now included the Duke of Châtelherault, the Earls of Argyll, Glencairn, and Rothes, and several lairds from Fife and Ayrshire. He had the support of John Knox. There were rumours of a plot to kidnap Mary and Darnley in June as they were travelling near Loch Leven. They would be imprisoned at St Andrews Castle and Castle Campbell. This plot was known as the "Raid of Beath". It was unclear if there was a real plot, or if rumours were spread by the Queen's party to discredit Moray and Argyll.

Moray's faction assembled at Glasgow in July, and Châtelherault and the earls met up at Dunoon Castle in Argyll in August 1565. The English politician William Cecil gave a summary of the causes and situation in a letter:

In the meantime, troubles arise there betwixt her and the Earl of Moray and others being friendly to the common amity of both the realms; whereunto for sundry respects it seemeth convenient for us to have regard. The Duke, the Earls of Argyll, Moray, and Rothes with sundry barons are joined together, not to allow of the mariage otherwise than to have the Religion established by law, but the Queen refuseth in this sort, she will not suffer it to have the force of law, but of permission to every man to live according to his conscience; and herewith she hath retained a great number of Protestants from association openly with the other. She hath sent for the Earl Moray, but the mistrust is so far entered on both sides, that I think it will fall to an evil end, for she hath put the Earl of Moray to the horn (outlawed him) and prohibited all persons to aid him. Nevertheless, the Duke, the Earls of Argyll and Rothes are together with him.

Mary and Darnley were married on 29 July 1565. On 13 August 1565, Mary and Darnley gave orders for the arrest of Moray's servant Nicoll Elphinstone, and on the next day required Moray and William Kirkcaldy of Grange to surrender the Abbot's house at St. Andrews, Ballinbreich Castle, and Hallyards Castle to their officers. Cecil kept his ambassador in Paris Thomas Smith informed of events, and on 1 September 1565 wrote "The Queen of Scotts hath much less number of hearts than her subjects".

== Uprising ==
The rebels gathered in Ayrshire. Both sides needed money to support their troops in the field. Nicolas Elphinstone is said to have obtained £10,000 from England for the rebels, and a French diplomat in London, Paul de Foix, discovered that money was delivered to Robert Melville. An English diplomat, John Tamworth, brought 3,000 or 4,000 crowns which were delivered to the Countess of Moray. Mary tried to pawn some of her jewels in Edinburgh for 2,000 English marks, but no-one would lend this sum. Mary spoke to the rich burgesses of Edinburgh, asking for loans to crush the rebellion. Six leading merchants were imprisoned till they obliged.

Mary discussed her response to the rebellion with Michel de Castelnau, the French ambassador in London, who came to Edinburgh and had audiences with her in the garden of Holyroodhouse. Mary and Darnley wrote to lairds, including Robert Murray of Abercairny, and issued a general letter calling for armed support to come to Edinburgh on 25 August, and declared the heirs of any casualties would inherit without financial penalties in their minorities (as was done before the battle of Flodden and Pinkie). They set out from Holyrood to Linlithgow and Stirling on 26 August 1565, to move to Glasgow and confront the rebel force. Her cannon followed, brought by John Chisholm, who had obtained funds from the Burgh of Edinburgh after Mary promised the town rights over Leith, the neighbouring port town.

The comptroller of the Scottish exchequer, John Wishart of Pitarrow, had sided with the rebellion and was replaced by William Murray of Tullibardine. The Provost of Edinburgh was also removed and Simon Preston of Craigmillar, a friend of Mary put in his place. Mary restored the honours of Lord Gordon as Earl of Huntly to ensure his support. The English diplomat Thomas Randolph claimed thieving and murder were rife, William Murray's lands were raided by Highlanders. Mary was anxious for her crown, and wrote from Glasgow to Philip II of Spain, for help. She sent the letter with an English servant of Darnley, possibly Anthony Standen or his brother.

Thomas Randolph heard, but was sceptical, that Mary herself carried a pistol in her hand near while riding near Hamilton. Only one of one her ladies in waiting followed her. Darnley wore a "gylte corslet", while the rest of the army wore jacks which were usual worn in Scotland. In York, Thomas Gargrave heard that Mary's forces had "500 hagbushes (hand-guns) and certain field pieces: the others hath neither shot nor ordinance, nor any better holds than their dwelling houses".

The rebels left Hamilton, and Mary's force, nearby, turned to follow them and in stormy weather several of her followers were drowned in a flood on the way to Callendar. On 31 August, Moray and his supporters arrived in Edinburgh with 1,000 or 1,200 men. The English diplomat Thomas Randolph doubted that this force could withstand the Queen and King's army, as they lacked "harquebusiers," soldiers with hand-guns. Edinburgh Castle was held for the Queen and began to shoot its cannon at the rebels in the town.

The rebel lords left Edinburgh. Mary came back to Edinburgh from Glasgow in early September and retired to Stirling Castle. Moray and his followers contemplated making for Carlisle in England. She visited Glasgow on 8 September, and a similar declaration was made for the heirs of any casualties among those who fought for her. On 9 September she went to St Andrews securing Castle Campbell and Lochleven Castle on the way. She went on to Dundee and Perth, then back to Glasgow.

Moray's supporters retreated to Dumfries. On 10 September they sent Robert Melville to ask Elizabeth I of England for guns, money, troops, support from Lord Scrope at Carlisle, and naval assistance in the Forth.

In response to the Chaseabout Raid, Mary and Darnley appointed Hucheon Rose of Kilravock keeper of Inverness Castle on 22 September 1565. The Earl of Huntly was made keeper again in October.

The English ship, The Aide captained by Anthony Jenkinson arrived in the Forth on 25 September, but was bombarded by the cannon on Inchkeith and returned to Berwick-upon-Tweed. Jenkynson intended to prevent Lord Seton bringing more munitions for Mary from France. Tents, called "palyeonis" in the Scots language, were sent from Edinburgh to Mary's troops in Nithsdale and Annandale.

Randolph described Mary's arms again on 13 October 1565, writing that she had a "secret or privy defence" for her body (a kind of jack), a "knapescalle" helmet, and a "dagge" pistol at her saddle.

At Rossdhu Castle, on 15 October, Mary's supporter John Colquhoun of Luss issued a proclamation that the people of Dumbarton should prepare to resist the army of the Earl of Argyll at the Hill of Ardmore. The Captain of Dumbarton Castle would be watchful and organise ships in the Clyde to shoot their guns at the Earl's boats in the river. According to George Buchanan, the Queen's cause was aided by John Maxwell, 4th Lord Herries of Terregles who changed sides. Moray failed to gather significant support and the rebellion was easily crushed by Mary, forcing Moray to flee.

This was a victory for Mary, although she had not confronted and defeated the rebels forces. On 19 October, Randolph described her return to Edinburgh, the "Queen is nowe retorned from her paynefull and greate jornaye. She roode farre with great expedition, myche troble of the whole countrie, and found not them whome she soughte, when she cam to her jornies ende".

== Moray in England ==
Most of the rebels including Moray and Châtellerault crossed the border at Carlisle, then made their way to Newcastle upon Tyne, but the Earl of Argyll stayed in Scotland in his western lands. Moray decided to go to London, and got as far as Royston in Hertfordshire, until he received a letter from Elizabeth I of England to stop as he was not invited and a rebel against his own queen. He was then brought to Westminster on 23 October 1565 to explain himself to Elizabeth and the French ambassadors. Mary sent her account of the rebellion and Moray's role to the French ambassador in London, Paul de Foix.

Moray had hoped his pregnant wife Agnes Keith would join him in England, sailing in Charles Wilson's ship. She stayed in St Andrews, and had their eldest daughter, Elizabeth, later Countess of Moray.

It was said that Mary and Darnley's relationship decayed after the Chaseabout Raid, or "Journey of Dumfreis". Darnley became jealous of David Rizzio who had a role in brokering pardons for the rebels, including Moray.

Elizabeth told Moray that "itt were no Prince's part to think well of your doinges, ... and, she wolde putt allso her helping hande too make them to understand the dutye which the subject owght to bear towarddes the Prynce." Moray declared he had not intended anything to the danger of Mary's person.

Moray stayed in England at Newcastle over the winter and returned to Scotland on 10 March 1566. Mary had summoned him for trial, and David Rizzio had just been murdered. Moray was reconciled with Mary and back on the Scottish Privy Council by 29 April 1566.

== Complaints against Mary ==
The rebels at Dumfries justified their cause by listing their complaints against Mary and her rule, which were sent to England in the hope of gaining recognition and support. These included specific details of the finance of the Church of Scotland, and were, in summary;

- Mary and Darnley plan to reinstate the Catholic religion.
- Inadequate and corrupt men were given positions in the Kirk.
- Church lands were sold with permissions from Rome.
- complaints about the process and effects of Mary's marriage.
- the status of Darnley as king.
- Improper diversion of funds from the patrimony of the church, (Thirds of benefices.)
- the deprivation of 42 men by the Sheriff of Ayr as rebels.
- the employment of foreigners at court including the two Italians David Rizzio, Francisco de Busso, and Mr Foular the Englishman. Lord Darnley, now King, is also a foreigner.

== See also ==
- Marian civil war
