= Abbot of Inchcolm =

The Abbot of Inchcolm, or until 1235, the Prior of Inchcolm, was the head of the Augustinian monastic community of Inchcolm (Innse Choluim; Latin Insula Columbae; Lowland Scots: St Comb's Isle).

== List of position holders ==
=== Priors of Inchcolm ===
- Brice (Máel Brigte?), fl. 1162x1178
- Roger, fl. 1163x1178
- Walter (I), x1179-1210
- Michael, 1210-1211
- Simon, 1211-?
- William, ?-1224
- Nigel of Jedburgh, 1224-x1228
- Henry, x1228-1243

=== Abbots of Inchcolm ===
- Henry, promoted to abbot in 1235; resigned in 1243
- Thomas, 1243/4-1268
- William, 1268-1277x
- Brice, fl. 1296
- None of the abbots are known until:
- John Dersy, died 1394
- Laurence, x1399-1417
- Walter Bower, 1417-1449
- John Kers, 1449-1460x5
- Michael Harwar, 1460x5-x1490
- Alexander Scrimgeour, x1490-1491
- Robert de Fontibus, 1491-1492
- Thomas Inglis, 1492-1505
- John Elwand (Elliot), 1505-x1532
- Richard Abercromby, 1532-1543

=== Titular abbots/commendators ===
- James Stewart, 1544-1581;(after 1558 frequently called commendator); died 1590
- Henry Stewart, died 1612

== See also ==
- Bishop of Dunkeld
