= Paul de Foix =

French diplomat and Catholic prelate (1528–1584)

Paul de Foix de Carmain (1528–1584) was a French prelate and diplomat. As ambassador in England he was involved in the relations of Elizabeth I and Mary, Queen of Scots.

== Career ==
He was son of Jean de Foix, comte de Carmain, by his wife Aldonce. He studied Greek and Roman literature at Paris, and jurisprudence at Toulouse, where shortly after finishing his curriculum he delivered a course of lectures on civil law, which gained him great reputation.

At the age of nineteen he was named councillor of the parlement of Paris. He was arrested on suspicion of harbouring Huguenot sympathies, but escaped punishment, and subsequently regained the favour of the French court.

At the end of 1561 he was sent ambassador to England, where he remained four years. He went to Scotland to visit Mary, Queen of Scots in December 1561, and took part in a tournament of "running at the ring" at Leith dressed in exotic costume. He commented on Mary's participation in dance at the Scottish court.

Paul de Foix made a memorandum detailing plans for an interview between Mary and Elizabeth in 1562 which he had discussed with William Maitland of Lethington. His secretary was sent to show Charles IX of France the schedule of events. The interview did not take place. The meeting would have been at Nottingham in September 1562, and Elizabeth would have awaited Mary at the Bishop's Palace at Southwell.

In June 1565, Elizabeth was not pleased at news of plans for the wedding of Mary, Queen of Scots, and Henry, Lord Darnley, and while playing a game of chess she spoke to Paul de Foix of her fury. They discussed Darnley as her pawn. De Foix discovered that Elizabeth had given sums of money to the rebels during the Chaseabout Raid, but was more concerned to avoid any possibility of a war which might involve France.

Mary, Queen of Scots, wrote to Paul de Foix in November 1565, describing the objections the Earl of Moray had to her marriage, and schemes made to prevent it. De Foix kept Charles IX of France informed of developments in Ireland and the Scottish queen's support of Shane O'Neill.

Paul de Foix was then sent to Venice, and returned a short time afterwards to England to negotiate a marriage between Queen Elizabeth and the duke of Anjou. He again fulfilled several important missions during the reign of Henry III of France. In 1577 he was made archbishop of Toulouse, and in 1579 was appointed ambassador to Rome, where he remained till his death.

Les Lettres de Messire de Paul de Foix, archevesque de Toloze et ambassadeur pour le roy aupres du pape Gregoire XIII, au roi Henry III, were published in 1628, but there are some doubts as to their authenticity.

== In fiction ==
In the 1998 film Elizabeth, he was portrayed by Eric Cantona.
