= Thomas Randolph (ambassador) =

English ambassador (1523–1590)

Thomas Randolph (1523–1590) was an English ambassador serving Queen Elizabeth I. Most of his professional life he spent in Scotland at the courts of Mary, Queen of Scots, and her son James VI. While in Scotland, he was embroiled in marriage projects and several upheavals. In 1568–1569, he was sent on a special embassy to Russia, visiting the court of Ivan the Terrible.

Randolph was also a Member of Parliament: for New Romney in 1558, Maidstone 1584, 1586 and 1589, Grantham 1559 and St Ives 1558 and 1572.

== Exile in France ==
Thomas Randolph was born in 1523, the son of Avery Randolph of Badlesmere, Kent and Anne Gainsford (NOT the lady-in-waiting to Anne Boleyn). He entered Christ Church, Oxford at the time of its foundation, and graduated B.A. in October 1545, and B.C.L. in 1548. Shortly afterwards he became a public notary; and in 1549 he was made principal of Broadgates Hall (now Pembroke College), Oxford. He continued there until 1553, when the Protestant persecutions under Queen Mary compelled him to resign and retire to France. Sir James Melville refers to Randolph's indebtedness to him "during his banishment in France"; Randolph seems to have mainly resided in Paris, where he was still living as a scholar in April 1557. It was probably during his stay in Paris that he came under the influence of George Buchanan, to whom, in a letter to Peter Young, tutor of James VI, he refers in very eulogistic terms as his 'master'. Among his fellow-students and intimates in Paris was Sir William Kirkcaldy of Grange.

== In the service of Elizabeth I ==
Soon after the accession of Elizabeth, in 1558, Randolph was acting as an agent of the English government in Germany, but in a few months returned to England; and, probably soon afterwards, bought a farm in Kent—"the house where he was born". Doubtless his acquaintance with the Scottish Protestants in Paris suggested to Elizabeth the employment of Randolph in the task of bringing the Earl of Arran, who had been compelled to flee from France, from Geneva to England.

At this time, Randolph sometimes signed his letters with a Latin phrase "Virtus pro divitiis", and he wrote the phrase in his copy of John Jewel's Apologia ecclesiae Anglicanae (London, 1562), a gift from James Stewart, 1st Earl of Moray. The book is now held by the University of Edinburgh.

=== In Scotland ===
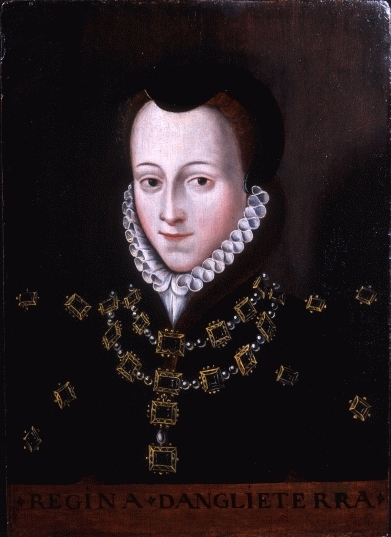
Mary, Queen of Scots, c.1558-1560

Under the name of Barnabie, and using the codename Pamphilus he was also sent in the autumn of 1559 to secretly conduct James Hamilton, 3rd Earl of Arran into Scotland. He left for London on 25 November, but was again sent to Scotland in March 1560, where his representations had considerable influence in encouraging the Protestants against the queen-regent, and in effecting an understanding between them and Elizabeth. The success of his mission suggested his continuance in Scotland as the confidential agent of Elizabeth; but being an ardent Protestant, he was as well a representative of William Cecil, Elizabeth's secretary of state, as of the Queen. Although by no means a match for Maitland of Lethington as a diplomatist, the fact that he possessed the confidence of the Protestant party enabled him to exercise no small influence in Scottish politics. His numerous letters are among the most valuable sources of information for this period; they abound in interesting details regarding the Queen of Scots and her court, and the political plots and social intrigues.

Randolph was hosted in Scotland by the Duke of Châtellerault and his son the Earl of Arran. In February 1561, he wrote to William Cecil that he thinking of finding other lodgings and that he had not received undue gains or gifts from the Hamiltons beyond the customary gold chain. Randolph obtained descriptions of meetings at Craigmillar Castle and Linlithgow Palace, where plans for Mary's return to Scotland were discussed.

At the marriage of Lord James Stewart and Agnes Keith in February 1562, on Shrove Tuesday Mary, Queen of Scots toasted Queen Elizabeth from a gold cup and then presented it to Randolph and talked to him of the "amity" between England and Scotland. Randolph described this incident in a letter to William Cecil and it was widely reported in England. Mary was sent a portrait of Elizabeth, and Randolph verified the likeness. They talked of a possible meeting of queens. Instead of meeting Elizabeth in England, in the autumn of 1562 Randolph accompanied the Queen of Scots, who professed for him a warm friendship, in an expedition to the north of Scotland. This resulted in the defeat and death of George Gordon, 4th Earl of Huntly; and Randolph even took part in the campaign, "being ashamed to sit still where so many were occupied".

In January 1563, Randolph went to Castle Campbell in Clackmannanshire to the wedding of James Stewart, Commendator of Inchcolm and Margaret Campbell. He had hoped to meet James MacConnel at the wedding. He described his entertainment at the Scottish court, "we passed our time in feasts, banqueting, masking, and running at the ring, and such like".

=== Marriage negotiations with Mary, Queen of Scots ===
Randolph described the appearance of Mary's entourage including her four Maries at the opening of Parliament in May 1563, writing "a fairer sight was never seen". He met a servant of the Catholic priest John Black at St Andrews in June 1563. He bribed the servant to show him Black's correspondence and copied it. On 5 June 1563 Elizabeth sent him a license to return to England on his private business.

On 20 April 1563 he was again sent to Scotland with the special aim of entangling the Scottish queen in negotiations for an English marriage. Elizabeth suggested Lord Robert Dudley, her own favourite, as a consort to Mary, whom she thus hoped to neutralise by a marriage to an Englishman. Randolph tried his best to further the project, which was strongly advocated by William Cecil, many of whose instructions to Randolph survive. At first Mary was not enthusiastic about the proposed match, however, when it became clear, that Elizabeth would declare Mary her official heir on condition that she marry Dudley, the proposal was taken very seriously on the Scottish part. In September 1564 Elizabeth bestowed on Dudley the earldom of Leicester to make him more acceptable to Mary. In the beginning of 1565, Mary accepted the proposal.

To the amazement of Randolph, however, Leicester was not to be moved to comply with the proposal:

But a man of that nature I never found any...he whom I go about to make as happy as ever was any, to put him in possession of a kingdom, to make him Prince of a mighty people, to lay in his naked arms a most fair and worthy lady...nothing regardeth the good that shall ensue unto him thereby...but so uncertainly dealeth that I know not where to find him.

Dudley indeed had made it clear to the Scots at the beginning of the affair, that he was not a candidate for Mary's hand, and forthwith had behaved with passive resistance. This Randolph had repeatedly tried to overcome by his letters. Elizabeth herself now had second thoughts regarding declarations concerning the succession. But as Henry Stuart, Lord Darnley became a serious candidate for Mary's marriage, Elizabeth wanted to prevent it. Randolph again received instructions to press for a marriage "with the Earl of Leicester or some other; and if he find it so far passed as it cannot be revoked, then he shall...declare, how much it shall miscontent her Majesty".

Randolph had time to report on a Roman antiquity discovered near Edinburgh at Musselburgh where there was an inscribed altar and a hypocaust, and to court Mary Beaton, one of Mary, Queen of Scots' companions. In April 1565 Beaton and Randolph teamed up to play bowls with the queen and Lord Darnley at Stirling Castle. They won, and Darnley gave Beaton a ring and a brooch with two agates worth fifty crowns. One of Randolph's Scottish contacts, Alexander Clark sent him a letter teasing him about their relationship in a joke using nonsense words; "And as to your mistress Marie Beton, she is both darimpus and sclenbrunit, and you in like manner without contrebaxion or kylteperante, so you are both worth little money."

Randolph, to his utter chagrin, could not prevent the marriage of the queen to Lord Darnley, and after the marriage, he declined to recognise Darnley's authority. Randolph's representations and promises may have contributed to the rebellion of James Stewart, 1st Earl of Moray, known as the Chaseabout Raid. On 16 January 1566 he reported Mary withheld the "Matrimonial crown" from Darnley and was now pregnant:

It is now spoken for certain that she is with child; and, as it is said, she felt it stir in her belly upon new year's day. Some ladies affirm that she hath milk in her breasts; and finding all other tokens to concur belonging to women lately married, assure it for certain that it can be no other.

On 14 February 1566 Randolph wrote to the Earl of Leicester that he was unable and unwilling to commit his opinions on Mary's actions on paper for fear of appearing "malicieus foolyshe and unadvised". In February 1566 he was accused by Mary of having assisted Moray and her rebellious subjects during the Chaseabout Raid with a gift of three thousand crowns, and was required to quit the country within six days. Ultimately he retired to Berwick upon Tweed, and while there he was, after the murder of Riccio, accused by Mary of having written a book against her, called Mr. Randolph's Phantasy.

=== Embassy to Russia and Scotland ===
He was recalled to England about June 1566, and apparently it was shortly after his return that he was appointed "Master of the King's Post," a position that later became postmaster general. On 2 November 1567 he obtained from Robert Constable an assignment of the office of constable or keeper of the Queenborough Castle and steward of the lordship or manor of Middleton and Merden in the county of Kent.

In June 1568, he was sent on a special embassy to Russia in behalf of the English merchants trading in that country; and he succeeded in obtaining from Ivan IV a grant of certain privileges to the merchant adventurers, which led to the formation of the Muscovy Company. He returned from Russia in the autumn of 1569. Following representations made by Regent Moray's agent Nicolas Elphinstone in January 1570 he was sent to Scotland, although uncertain news of the Regent's assassination had reached London. He remained in Scotland for a year. The chronicle known as the Diurnal of Occurrents relates that he attended a meeting of the nobility at Dalkeith Palace in February 1570, where the potential homecoming of Mary, Queen of Scots, was discussed. The Earl of Argyll accused him of sowing discord in Scotland.

=== Again in France and Scotland ===
In October 1573 and April 1576 he went on special embassies to France. He was sent to Scotland in February 1578, but too late to prevent the fall of James Douglas, 4th Earl of Morton. After the imprisonment of Morton in 1580 he returned to Scotland to conduct negotiations on his behalf. At a convention of the estates, held on 20 February 1581, besides presenting a paper declaring the "Intention of the Queen's Majesty and her Offers to the King of Scotland', he, in a speech of two hours" duration, denounced Esme Stewart, created Duke of Lennox by the king, as an agent of Rome. If anything, however, his bold intervention only helped to seal Morton's fate. Having failed to thwart the purposes of Lennox by a public accusation, he now attempted, with Elizabeth's sanction, to concoct a plot for the seizure of him and the young king; but, the plot having been betrayed, he fled to Berwick, after he had narrowly escaped death from a shot fired into the room he occupied in the provost's house at Edinburgh. Randolph's advice from Scotland had a direct effect on English policy, he counselled Elizabeth against the use of military intervention in Scotland against the Lennox government.

=== Scotland in 1586 ===
Randolph was sent on his last mission to Scotland in January 1586, accompanied by Thomas Mills, with instructions for the negotiation of a treaty between the two kingdoms, to which he succeeded in obtaining the signature of James VI despite the efforts of a French diplomat Charles de Prunelé, Baron d'Esneval.

In August 1586 Randolph and the Scottish ambassador in London, Archibald Douglas, sent male deer and huntsmen to serve James VI at the park of Falkland Palace. The huntsmen probably included Cuthbert Rayne. Randolph wrote:

I have sent the Kynge two hunting men, verie good and skillful, with one footman, that can hoop, hollow and crye, that all the trees in Fawkland will quake for fear. Pray the Kynge's Majestie to be mercifull to the poor bucks; but let him spare and look well to himself.

Randolph presented £4,000 to James VI from Elizabeth, the first payment of a regular subsidy. He noted in a memorandum that James VI did not issue receipts for money given to him, and neither had Regents James Douglas, 4th Earl of Morton and James Stewart, 1st Earl of Moray in previous years. He explained that princes and others do not give "bills of their hands" for "danger or reproach unto themselves for receiving of the same".

== Later years ==
Randolph held the joint offices of Chamberlain of the Exchequer and Master of the Post till his death, which took place in his house in St. Peter's Hill, near Thames Street, London, on 8 June 1590, when he was in his sixty-seventh year. He was buried in the church of St. Peter's, Paul's Wharf. Randolph, during his embassies, was kept very short of money, and had frequent difficulty in paying his expenses. Nor, important as had been his services, did he receive any reward beyond the not very remunerative offices above mentioned. The statement of Wood that he was knighted in 1571 is not supported by any evidence. Randolph is supposed to have been the author of the original short Latin Life of George Buchanan, but this must be regarded as at least doubtful. He took a special interest in the progress of Buchanan's History, and offered his aid with money if necessary towards its completion.

Randolph died in 1590.

In July 1593 the Scottish ambassador in London, with Roger Aston, insisted that the deceased diplomat Thomas Randolph had promised in 1586 the sum of £5000 yearly would be paid to James VI as a subsidy or annuity. William Cecil thought this unlikely, and ordered Randolph's papers to be searched for any record of this.

=== Marriages ===
Towards the close of 1571, he married Anne Walsingham, a daughter of Thomas Walsingham of Chislehurst, and a cousin once removed of Francis Walsingham. Before the marriage he received, on 1 October 1571, an assignment from Thomas Walsingham and William Crowner of letters patent of the custody of the manor and hundred of Middleton and Merden, at the rent of 100 pounds per annum, to be paid to his intended wife. In 1572 he obtained the position of Chamberlain of the Exchequer for life.

His old friend the bachelor George Buchanan teased him about his marriage in 1572;

If you had been in your right wit, you being once escaped the tempestous storms and naufrage (shipwreck) of marriage, had never entered again the same dangers, for I cannot take you for a Stoic philosopher, having one head inexpugnable (not to be captured) with the frenetic tortures of jealousy, or a careless heart sceptic that takes cuckoldry as thing indifferent.

The children of Anne Walsingham and Thomas Randolph included:

- John Randolph
- Anne Randolph.

Thomas Randolph married secondly, Ursula Copinger, a daughter of Henry Copinger of Allhallows Hoo, Kent, and Buxhall, Suffolk, and his wife Agnes, a daughter of Thomas Jermyn (died 1552). Their children included:

- Thomas Randolph
- Ambrose Randolph (died 1660)
- Robert Randolph
- Frances Randolph, who married Thomas Fitzgerald, a brother of Gerald FitzGerald, 14th Earl of Kildare. Their son became George FitzGerald, 16th Earl of Kildare.
- Elizabeth Randolph, whose marriage to a cousin Thomas Coppinger was annulled.
- Dorothy Randolph.

Political offices
Preceded by John Mason	Master of the King's Posts; 1566–1590	Succeeded by John Stanhope
