= Richard Douglas (letter writer) =

Scottish landowner, courtier, and letter writer

Richard Douglas (floruit 1560–1600) was a Scottish landowner, courtier, and letter writer.

== Career ==
He was a son of William Douglas of Whittinghame and Elizabeth Lauder.

He wrote letters to his uncle, Mr Archibald Douglas, a diplomat and intriguer who was often in London, with news from Scotland. Some sources state that Richard was the brother of Mr Archibald Douglas, but in his letters to Archibald he calls himself "nephew". In his letters to Archibald Douglas, Richard Douglas disguised some personal names with code-names chosen from classical authors.

His sister Elizabeth Douglas is thought to have been the author "E. D." who composed two sonnets addressed to the poet and secretary of Anne of Denmark, William Fowler. Fowler wrote an epitaph in 1594 for Elizabeth Douglas, who was the wife of an East Lothian laird and diplomat, Samuel Cockburn of Templehall. It has also been suggested that "E. D" was Elizabeth Douglas, Countess of Erroll.

Richard Douglas had been a pledge with Francis Walsingham in London. He wrote to Walsingham in April 1584 asking him for help to redress the losses he and his brother-in-law Samuel Cockburn of Temple Hall had suffered at sea when English pirates took their chests and coffers. They had been in London attached to the embassy of Colonel Willam Stewart. They were reviving their claim because they heard the pirate had been captured, and sent Cockburn's servant John Douglas to Walsingham.

In March 1587 he wrote to his uncle Archibald Douglas describing a meeting with the Secretary, John Maitland of Thirlestane. He had conveyed Archibald's messages according to instructions. In the same month he wrote to his brother, William Douglas of Whittinghame from Whittingehame Tower mentioning a lawsuit.

In August 1587 he came to King James at Inchmurrin and went on with him to Dumbarton and Hamilton, where he discussed Archibald Douglas' letters with the King and Justice Clerk, Lewis Bellenden. He heard news of the recent Scottish diplomatic mission to Denmark. Frederick II had promised his eldest daughter Elisabeth in marriage to another, but would be happy for James VI to marry Anne of Denmark, and might even renegotiate so James VI could marry Elizabeth. There would be a convention of the nobility at Falkland Palace in September to discuss the royal marriage.

He saw the departure of the French diplomat and poet Guillaume de Salluste Du Bartas. The poet left from Dumbarton Castle for La Rochelle laden with presents. James VI hired one of the best ships in Scotland for him, knighted him, and gave him a gold chain, and 2000 gold crowns, and to all his companions money and "a tablett of gold, having in itt his Majesties pourtraict", besides several hackney horses and other presents from the nobility and courtiers.

In January 1589 he wrote to Archibald that the Laird of Wemyss, James Colville of East Wemyss, would be coming to London on the king's business. There would be a tax of £100,000 Scots for the marriage of James VI of Scotland, although it had not been decided if he would marry Anne of Denmark or Catherine de Bourbon sister of Henry IV of France. His mother, Elizabeth Lauder, Lady Whittingehame, sent Archibald a gift of Westland, Loch Fyne, herrings, and would like him to send two crates of glass and lead for windows.

In January 1589 he came to London with messages for Queen Elizabeth from the Earl of Bothwell. Mr Archibald Douglas wrote to Francis Walsingham that Richard Douglas was unwell, and also he wanted Walsingham's advice before Richard went to court to have an audience, because the matters to be discussed were very important.

A letter to one of his brothers of March 1589 mentions that the king had been hunting at Biel near Dunbar. He wrote to Archibald in August 1589 that the king appreciated a gift of dogs sent by Lord Warwick but would prefer a couple of faster hounds. In March 1590 he attended a banquet for the christening of Elizabeth Stewart, daughter of the Earl of Bothwell. He sent Cecil news of disagreements among the Scottish nobles in Denmark, and that James VI had borrowed 10,000 dalers from his mother-in-law, Sophie of Mecklenburg-Güstrow. Sophie's loan or gift was recorded in an account made by John Maitland of Thirlestane.

Richard Douglas enterprised with John Lowe to build a ship in Norway, which required special licences and was completed in 1592.

The English diplomat George Nicholson and the courtier Roger Aston noted he was at Falkland Palace in September 1595, speaking in favour of the Earl of Angus, and for the return of his uncle Mr Archibald Douglas from London.

== Family ==
Richard Douglas married Christian Douglas, daughter of Robert Douglas, Earl of Buchan, and Christina Stewart, 4th Countess of Buchan.
