= Richard Cockburn of Clerkington =

Sir Richard Cockburn of Clerkington, Lord Clerkintoun (1565–1627) was a senior government official in Scotland serving as Lord Privy Seal of Scotland during the reign of James VI.

== Life ==
He was the eldest son and heir of Sir John Cockburn of Clerkington, and Helen Maitland, a daughter of Richard Maitland of Lethington. He was born around 1565 at Clerkington House near Haddington, East Lothian.

In March 1589 he went to London with John Colville, Laird of Easter Wemyss and kissed the hand of Queen Elizabeth. James VI gave them £666 Scots for their expenses. He stayed in the house of Archibald Douglas in London, but wrote to his uncle the Chancellor, John Maitland, that he was not minded to have any dealing with Douglas. Thomas Fowler heard that Francis Walsingham had arranged for him to have a present of a gold chain, but the gift fell through.

Cockburn trained as a lawyer and became a judge. He accompanied James VI of Scotland to Denmark, and gave money to the skipper of the Scottish ships when the king visited the dockyard at Copenhagen on 3 March 1590. Subsequently, he was appointed to a committee to audit the account of money spent by his uncle, John Maitland, on the royal voyage. The funds came from the English subsidy and the dowry of Anne of Denmark.

In February 1591, James VI of Scotland attended the wedding of his sister Isabella to David Crichton of Lugton at Thirlestane Castle, hosted by the uncle of the bride, the Chancellor, John Maitland, where "friendship was confirmed with a carouse". Costume records suggest a masque entertainment may have been planned.

In April 1591, Cockburn was made Secretary of State. In May he took letters relating to shipping to James VI at Falkland Palace, with the news that Queen Elizabeth was sending 40 male deer from Colchester as a present for him.

He was Secretary of State to James VI from April 1591 to 1596. In September 1591 Cockburn was admitted as a Lord of Session. According to the English ambassador Robert Bowes, Cockburn had been "Master of Ceremonies" and this office was transferred to the Master of Work, William Schaw. These appointments followed the death of Lewis Bellenden.

In November 1591, he was elected a Senator of the College of Justice being elected at the same time as Andrew Wemyss, Lord Myrecairnie. In December 1593, Richard Cockburn was appointed to a committee to audit the account of money spent by John Maitland on the royal voyages. The funds in question came from the English subsidy and the dowry of Anne of Denmark.

== Ambassador in 1594 ==
In July 1594 he was sent as ambassador to London to advise on the danger posed by the Catholic Earls in Scotland and to ask for assistance, especially money, James VI hoped for £3,000 sterling at least. He also complained about the entertainment of the poet Henry Lok, an agent of the rebel Earl of Bothwell at the English court, and the residence of the outlawed Master John Colville at Tweedmouth. On 15 September 1594 he was still in London where he met the queen and kissed her hand. He was accompanied by James Bellenden and George Douglas of Longniddry, a servant of Anne of Denmark. He wrote in friendly terms to Sir Robert Cecil, who replied on 17 September 1594.

On 12 November 1594 Robert Cecil gave him a letter from the queen to carry back to James VI. He was given £3,000 or £2,000 for James VI. Elizabeth let it be known that the money should be taken to Scotland, and not spent in London, as had happened to the annuity or subsidy money in previous years. He passed £680 Scots from this sum to the goldsmith and royal financier Thomas Foulis for the king's use. The rest of the money was sent to the Duke of Lennox for the wages of his soldiers in the north of Scotland.

Elizabeth I was inclined to give generously in 1594 after the discovery of a small Flemish ship or barque at Montrose at the end of April, thought to have brought Spanish gold for the Catholic earls, and a second ship came to Aberdeen bringing the Jesuit James Gordon in July. The cost of Cockburn's embassy was met with £1,000 Scots from the Danish dowry, which had been invested with the town council of Haddington.

Cockburn wrote to James Hudson on 22 May 1595 in the "spirit of prophecy" about the fortunes of his uncle the Chancellor of Scotland, John Maitland of Thirlestane and his adversaries. In July, Maitland wrote to the Earl of Essex, about their future "diligent intercourse of intelligence" involving Cockburn and Anthony Bacon. Essex replied that he wrote only with the queen's knowledge, and they would be happy to receive letters from Maitland or Cockburn. Also in July, Cockburn's trip to England to see the queen was mentioned in a letter from James to Elizabeth.

In September 1595 his uncle the Chancellor, John Maitland became mortally ill and could not sleep, despite the efforts of the court physician Martin Schöner. Maitland sent Cockburn to the king with a message to excuse his previous quarrels with the Earl of Mar and the king wrote a kind letter in reply.

== Later career ==
In May 1596 Sir Richard was replaced as Secretary of State by John Lindsay of Balcarres, one of the eight Octavians who were appointed by James in January of that same year as commissioners to reform the financial processes of the Scottish government. On 14 November he returned to the Privy Council the original signed copy of a letter which Elizabeth had written on 2 June 1586, offering annual gifts of money for the king's expenses.

In 1598 Sir Richard regained the office of Keeper of the Privy Seal of Scotland, a position that had been taken over temporarily by John Lindsay. In 1610 he was confirmed as a member in the new Privy Council and at the same time appointed to the Court of High Commission for church affairs. But in February 1626 he was removed from the bench as a result of the resolution by the new king, Charles I, that no noblemen nor officers of the state be simultaneously members of the judiciary.

He died in October 1627 in Haddington.

== Family ==
His sister Marion Cockburn married Thomas Otterburn of Redhall and Auldhame in 1595.

In about 1611, Sir Richard married his distant cousin, Margaret Cockburn, the daughter of Sir William Cockburn of Langton. The Cockburns were an important land-owning family in the Scottish Lowlands since the early part of the 14th century. The marriage brought together the wealthy Langton and politically influential Clerkington branches of that family. Sir Richard and Margaret had a daughter, born in March 1612 in Edinburgh; a son Patrick, born in March 1613 who died in infancy; and a second son Patrick who was born in November 1614. Sir Richard was succeeded as Laird of Clerkington by his son Patrick.

Church records confirm that Sir Richard had at least seven illegitimate children, all born in Edinburgh, with one or more unrecorded women. Jeane was born in April 1599. Anna was born in March 1604. Johne was born in April 1605. Helene was born in December 1606. Richard was born in July 1608. William was born in August 1609. Issobel was born in December 1610. In 1620 Jeane married James Pringle, the 5th Laird of Torwoodlee.
