= Marie Maitland =

Scottish writer

Marie Maitland Lady Haltoun
- Born: c. 1550
- Died: 1596
- Other names: Mary Maitland; Lady Haltoun
- Spouse: Alexander Lauder of Haltoun (m. 1586)
- Parents: Sir Richard Maitland (father); Mariotta/Margaret Cranstoun (mother)

Marie Maitland (c. 1550 – 1596) was a Scottish writer and poet, a member of the Maitland family of Lethington and Thirlestane Castle, and later Lady Haltoun. Her first name is sometimes written as "Mary".

== Early life ==
Marie Maitland was a daughter of Sir Richard Maitland of Lethington and Thirlestane (1496–1586) and Mariotta (or Margaret) Cranstoun (died 1586), the daughter of Sir Thomas Cranstoun of Corsbie, Berwickshire, Scotland.

Marie had three brothers and three sisters. Her eldest brother, William Maitland of Lethington (died 1573), was Secretary to Mary, Queen of Scots. Her second eldest brother was John Maitland, 1st Lord Maitland of Thirlestane (1543-1595), Lord Chancellor of Scotland.

== Maitland manuscripts and poetry ==
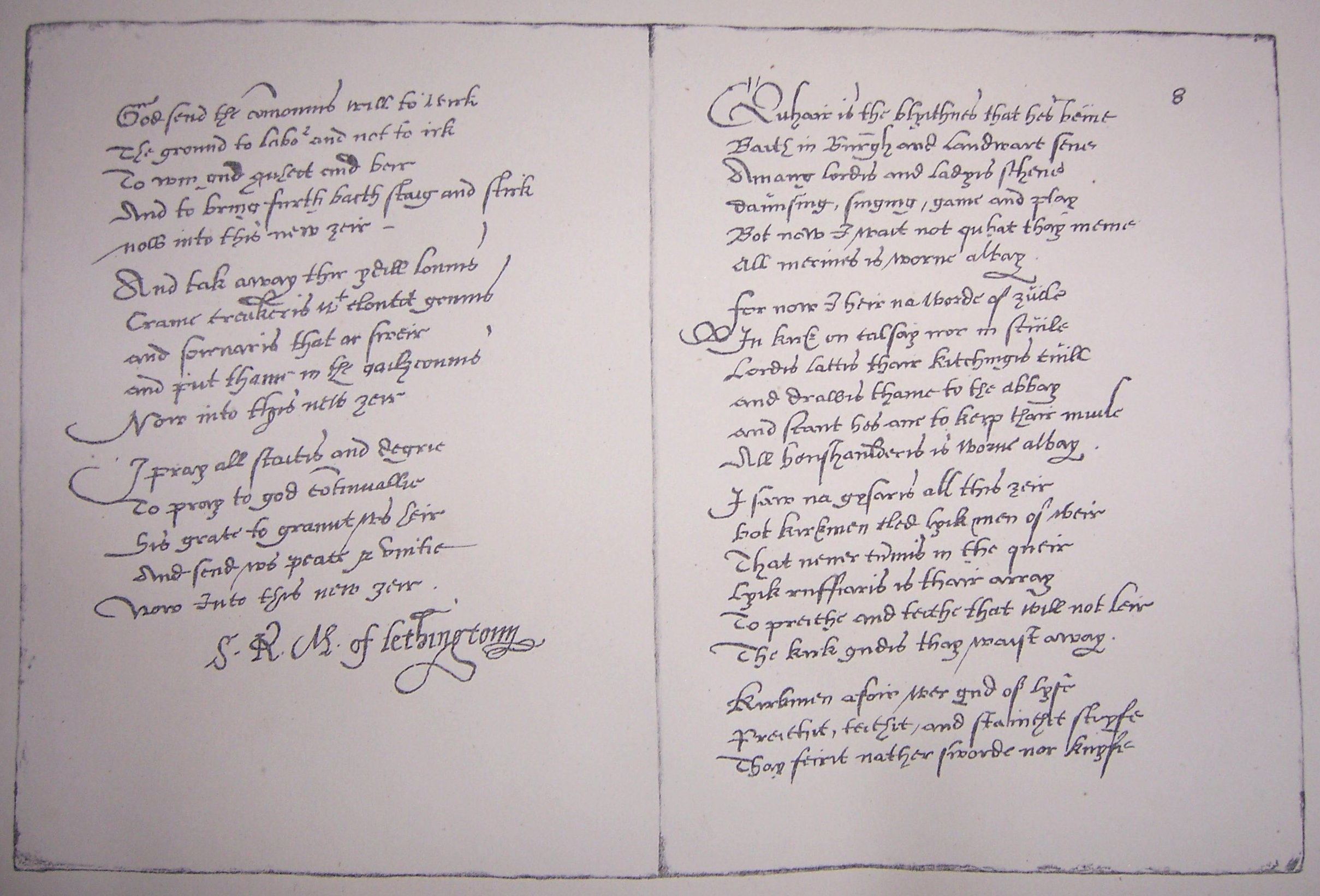
Two pages of the Maitland Quarto Manuscript transcribed by Marie. The original is in the Pepys Library in Cambridge.

Marie recorded and preserved her father's extensive writings as his sight became increasingly poor, eventually resulting in his blindness. The Maitland folio and quarto manuscripts are anthologies of poems compiled and authored by the Maitland family and are important sources for Scots literature of the fifteenth and sixteenth centuries.

The manuscripts are written in Italic and Secretary hands. John Pinkerton, who published many of the poems in 1786, was the first to suggest that Marie Maitland was the scribe. Her name appears twice on the titlepage of the quarto manuscript, written around 1586. Pinkerton suggested that one poem alludes to her work writing the manuscript, in which the author asks for Diana's favours. The text of poem 69 in the Quarto includes her name.

Pinkerton's views were challenged by William Craigie in 1920, who considered that Marie was not the scribe of the Quarto manuscript. Recent scholars accept that Marie wrote most of the text and may have authored some of the verse. Some poems within the Maitland Quarto were composed by Marie Maitland while others name her or are dedicated to her. Several poems seem written in a female voice, or employ imagery and metaphor which indicate female authorship. These lines, in the Scots language, come from the end of Poem 49, which was almost certainly written by Marie.

And thoucht adversitie ws vex
Yit be our freindschip salbe sein
Thair is mair constancie in our sex
Than evir amang men hes bein

And though adversity us vex
Yet by our friendship shall be seen
There is more constancy in our sex
Than ever among men has been.

The Maitland Quarto contains poetry which has been described as explicitly lesbian, penned by Marie, which is among the earliest such poetry in any language in Europe since the time of Sappho herself.

== Lennoxlove and Lethington ==
Amongst the verse in the Maitland manuscripts, Joanna Martin identifies Lethington (No. 68) as one of the earliest examples of the 'country house' genre. The poem describes the old tower at Lethington (Lennoxlove) and its gardens from the viewpoint of an exile.

Lethington Castle, the family home, was confiscated in 1571 during the Marian Civil War following her brother William Maitland's arraignment for treason. Pamela M. King has suggested that, as one of Sir Richard Maitlands's younger children, Marie Maitland could still have been living at Lethington in 1571, and attributes the poem Lethington, to Marie, as her response to that experience.

== Landed property and the Maitland dowry ==
Marie's father allocated money for her dowry. She was then a party to a contract in February 1579 lending money to John Leslie of Balquhain in Aberdeenshire. In return she would receive an income called an "annualrent" from the Leslie lands. Ashley Douglas suggests that this sum lent to John Leslie was her dowry.

Marie was also property owner before her marriage, as the principal "tackswoman" of the teind sheaves of Bolton parish. A tack was a kind of lease, and Marie was entitled to an income from the harvest of farms in the parish. On 30 July 1582, she made over rights to the harvest at Marwyngstoun (now Marvingston) to Richard Cranstoun, who would pay her 10 merks annually for the next 19 years. She also received an income from the estates of Dundas of Dundas Castle as interest for a loan or "annualrent". Marie Maitland wrote and signed receipts for George Dundas, known as "acquittances". She signed some of these receipts at Lethington.

== Family and literary relationships ==
Marie Maitland married Alexander Lauder of Haltoun in June 1586. Alexander Lauder was Sheriff Principal of Edinburgh, and was buried in Holyrood Abbey on 14 November 1627. Marie would not have been known as "Marie Lauder" after her marriage, because women in early modern Scotland did not usually adopt their husband's surnames.

Hatton or Haltoun is an estate near Kirkliston in Ratho parish. Alexander Lauder was a son of William Lauder (died 1596) and Jean Cockburn (died 1600). William Lauder was one of several lairds involved in the murder of David Rizzio, and he hosted the Earl of Bothwell at Hatton on 23 April 1567, the day before he abducted Mary, Queen of Scots. The poet Alexander Scott, who wrote Ane New Yeir Gift to Quene Mary was a connection by marriage of the Lauders.

Jean Cockburn's aunt or great aunt (who was Marie Maitland's niece), Elizabeth Douglas, Lady Temple Hall, seems also to have been a poet, working in the same circle of East Lothian poets, but it has also been suggested that this poetic identity was Elizabeth Douglas, Countess of Erroll.

Alexander Lauder with his younger brother got into trouble in 1596. They threatened Alexander McGill, the Provost of Corstorphine "under colour of friendship" because they wanted him to sign a contract.

Marie Maitland, Lady Haltoun's children included:

- Alexander Lauder younger of Hatton (died 1623), who married Susannah Cunningham, a daughter of the Earl of Glencairn, and sister of the writer Margaret Cunningham.
- Richard Lauder of Hatton (1589-1675), his younger daughter Elizabeth married Charles Maitland, later Earl of Lauderdale.
- Jane Lauder, who married (1) Alexander Hay of Smithfield, (2) Bryce Sempill of Boghauche and Cathcart.
- Helen Lauder (died 1620), who married Thomas Young of Leny, a lawyer.

Marie Maitland died in June 1596. Soon after Marie's death, Alexander Lauder married Annabella Bellenden, a sister of the lawyer, Lewis or Ludovick Bellenden of Auchnoule, and sister-in-law of the courtier Margaret Livingstone, Countess of Orkney. Annabella would be a stepmother for their young children.

George Lauder, a son of Alexander Lauder and Annabella Bellenden, was a soldier. He was a friend of William Drummond of Hawthornden and gained a considerable reputation as a poet.

== Popular culture ==
Historian Ashley Douglas, who described Maitland as a "sixteenth-century Scottish Sappho", was involved in commissioning an imagined modern portrait of Marie Maitland, which is currently on display at the Scottish National Portrait Gallery. Her book, With My Own Hand: The secret life of Marie Maitland, Scotland's sixteenth-century Sappho, draws on a range of primary sources to tell the story of Marie Maitland and her manuscript and its lesbian love poetry.
