= Richard Maitland =

Scottish poet

- Born: 1496
- Died: 1586 (aged 89–90)
- Known for: Senator of the College of Justice

Sir Richard Maitland of Lethington and Thirlestane (1496 – 1 August 1586) was Scottish lawyer, landowner, courtier, and poet.

== Career ==
Maitland was a Senator of the College of Justice, an Ordinary Lord of Session from 1561 until 1584, and notable Scottish poet. He was served heir to his father, Sir William Maitland of Lethington, East Lothian, and Thirlestane, Berwickshire, on 15 October 1515, following his father's death at the Battle of Flodden.

Richard Maitland was said to have refused to assist the English occupying army during the war now known as the Rough Wooing. His grandson, James Maitland, wrote that "most part of the Gentlemen of Lothian, Merse, and Teviotdale did assure, but my grandfather would not assure", even though the English occupied Haddington and Lauder where his lands were.

Maitland's poetry includes his reaction to the Scottish Reformation of 1560. In Quhair is the blyithness that hes beine he describes the reduced celebration of Christmas, including the former customs of guising and hospitality offered by landowners.

He held the political office of Keeper of the Great Seal of Scotland and was also the Keeper of the Privy Seal of Scotland, from 1563 to 1567, and was succeeded in this post by his son John Maitland.

== Marriage and children ==
He married Mariotta (or Margaret) (d. March 1586), daughter of Sir Thomas Cranstoun of Corsbie, in Berwickshire. They had three sons and four daughters, including

- William Maitland of Lethington, Secretary of State to Mary, Queen of Scots, and
- Sir John Maitland of Thirlestane, Lord Chancellor of Scotland;
- Thomas Maitland (died 1572), poet and supporter of Mary, Queen of Scots.
- Isabella Maitland, who married Sir James Heriot of Traboun
- Marie Maitland (d. January 1596), who married Alexander Lauder of Haltoun (d. 1627).
- Elizabeth Maitland, who married William Douglas of Whittinghame.
- Helen Maitland, who married John Cockburn of Clerkington in 1560, and was the mother of Richard Cockburn of Clerkington.

== The Maitland Manuscripts ==
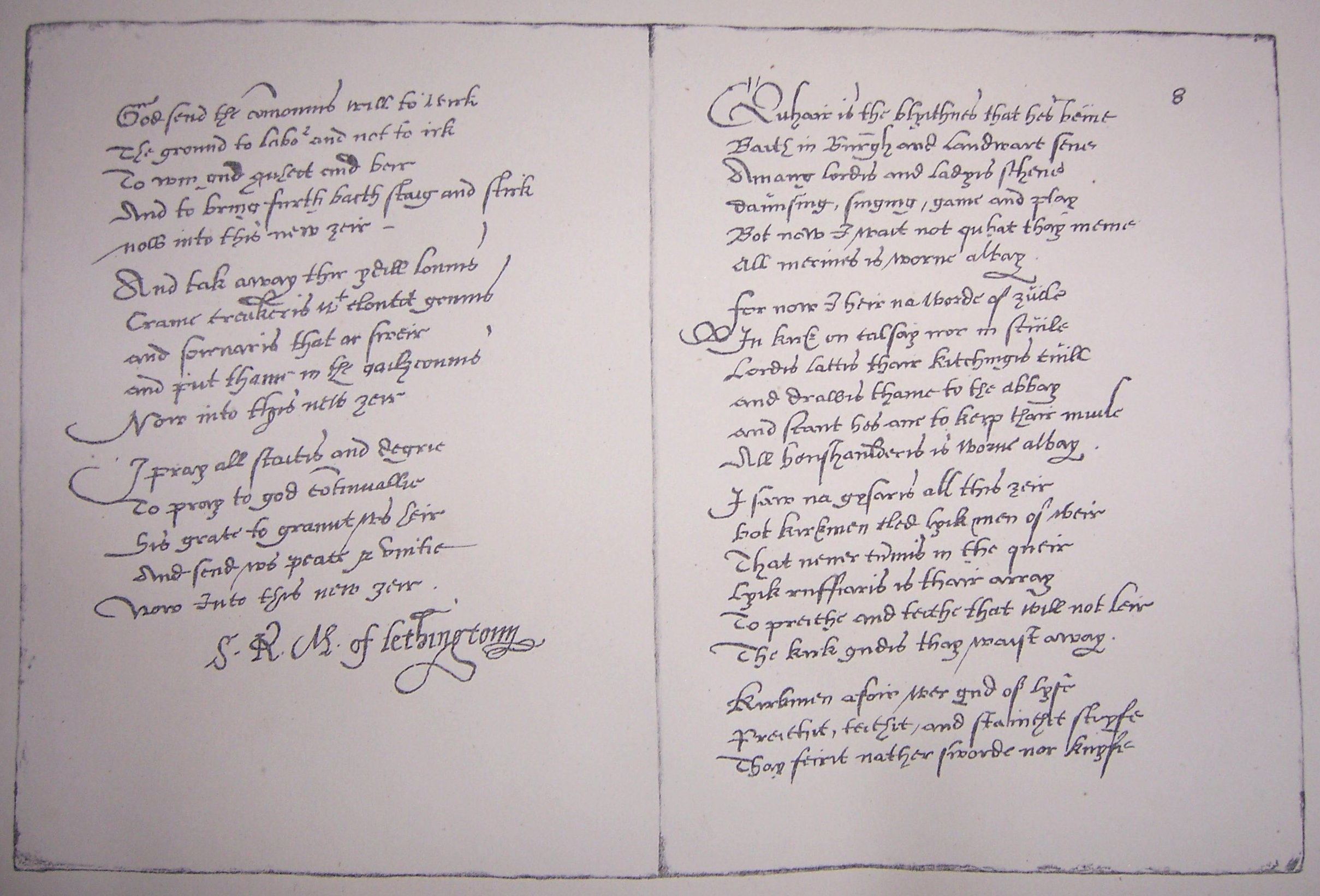
Pages from The Maitland Quarto Manuscript held by the Pepys Library. Maitland's signature is prominent.

Two of Maitland's manuscript works survive, known as the Maitland Folio and Maitland Quarto; both are compilations of the Scots literature of his era. They are held by the Pepys Library.

The manuscripts preserve many of the works of the great makars and a large number of anonymous pieces. The manuscripts also record many of Maitland's own compositions. Maitland's daughter Marie transcribed his poems as well as her brother John Maitland's and others.

Maitland's poems, especially in the Maitland Quarto (MQ), lament division in Scotland during the Marian Civil War (1569–1573), and seem to lay blame on English interventions.

== Relations ==
Maitland is the 12th great-grandfather of prominent Canadian sculptor and poet Christian Cardell Corbet.

== Other sources ==
- Miscellanea Genealogica et Heraldica, edited by Joseph Jackson Howard, vol. 2, London, 1876, p. 206, where his date of death is given as 1 August 1586.
- The Genealogy of the House and Surname of Setoun, by Richard Maitland of Lethington, March 1561, with the Chronicle of the House of Setoun compiled in metre (prose) by John Kamington alias Peter Manye, (Edinburgh, 1830).
- The Register of the Privy Council of Scotland, Second Series, edited by P. Hume Brown, Edinburgh, 1900, vol. 2, 1627–1628, p. 117.
- Maitland, Richard, The History of the House of Seytoun to 1559 by Sir Richard Maitland of Lethington continued by Alexander Viscount Kingston, (Maitland Club, 1829)
- "A Biographical Dictionary of Eminent Scotsmen: Hamilton, William-M'Gavin" By Robert Chambers, Thomas Thomson

Political offices
Unknown	Keeper of the Great Seal of Scotland unknown – unknown	Unknown
Preceded by Alexander Seton, 1st Lord Fyvie	Keeper of the Privy Seal of Scotland; 1563–1567	Succeeded by John Maitland
