= Samuel Cockburn of Templehall =

Samuel Cockburn of Templehall and Vogrie (died 1614) was a Scottish landowner, diplomat, and Sheriff-principal of Edinburgh.

He was a son of John Cockburn of Ormiston and Alison Sandilands (died 1584), a daughter of Sir John Sandilands of Calder.

Temple Hall was located on the banks of the Kinchie burn in the parish of Ormiston in East Lothian.

Cockburn went to England as ambassador with William Stewart and John Colville in 1583. He sent some household goods and clothing from London in a ship of Prestonpans but it was captured by pirates near Great Yarmouth.

Cockburn married the poet Elizabeth Douglas, a sister of Richard Douglas, and daughter of William Douglas of Whittinghame. She is thought to have been the author "E. D." who composed two sonnets addressed to the poet and secretary of Anne of Denmark, William Fowler. Elizabeth Douglas died on 19 March 1593. Fowler wrote an epitaph in 1594 for her, a "funeral sonnet" which was printed by Robert Waldegrave. It has also been suggested that the author "E. D" was Elizabeth Douglas, Countess of Erroll.

Cockburn and Elizabeth Douglas bought the lands of Vogrie from John Lumsden of Blanerne in 1590. The transaction included the assent of members of the wider Lumsden family, and was witnessed by the merchant Clement Cor father-in-law of Robert Lumsden of Ardrie.

In a letter of June 1596, Cockburn reported to Archibald Douglas that James Douglas of Spott was quarreling with Richard Douglas and James Douglas. Cockburn promised to negotiate with Sir George Home on behalf of the Douglas family interests.

His son Francis became laird of Templehall, and William became laird of Vogrie. A third son, John Cockburn, lived at Blackfriars in London.

Samuel Cockburn died in 1614.
