= Wilhelm von der Wense =

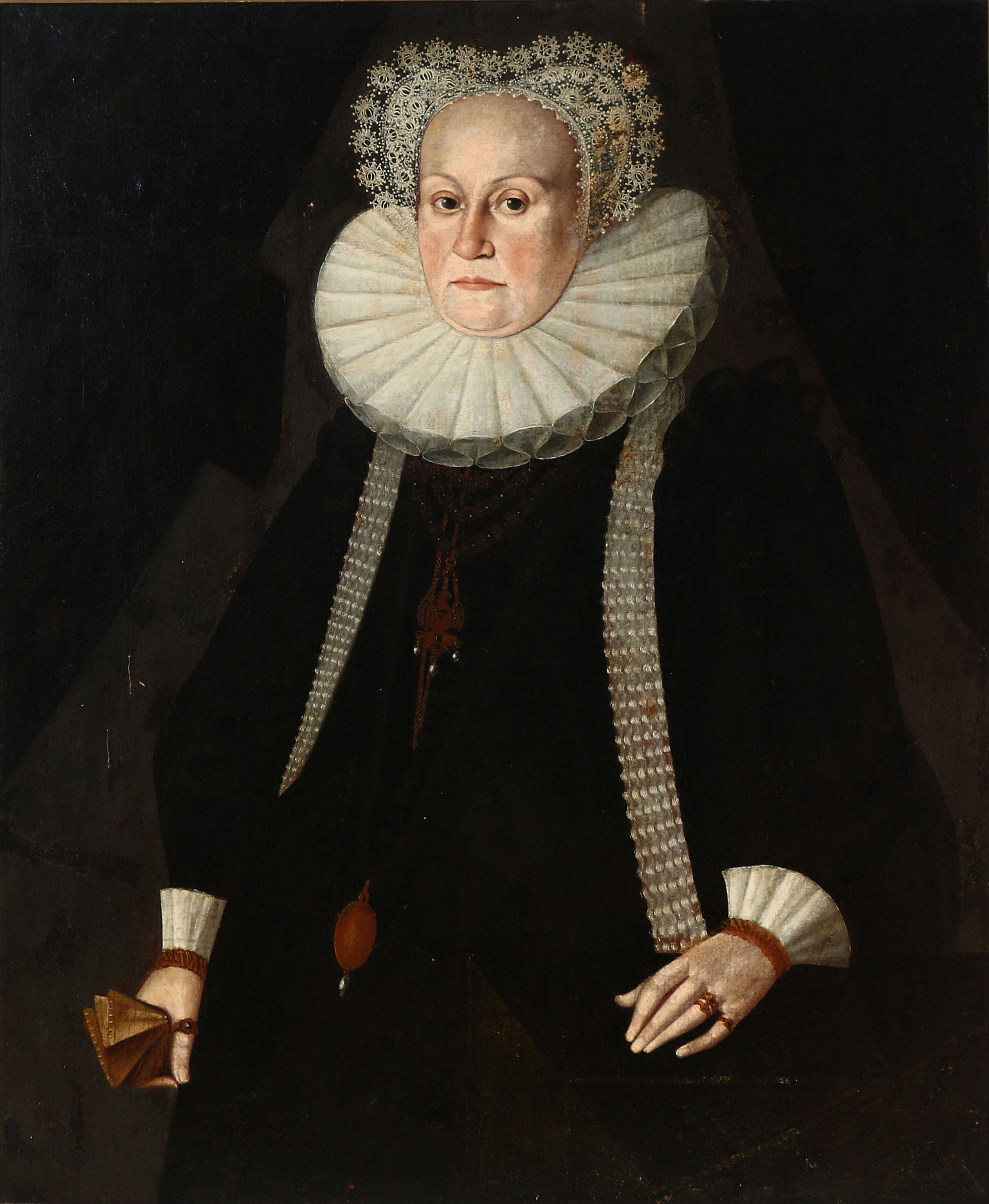
Sophie of Mecklenburg-Güstrow

Wilhelm von der Wense (floruit 1580-1610) was a German-speaking courtier and Danish diplomat serving Sophie of Mecklenburg-Güstrow.

== Career ==
Wilhelm von der Wense was a servant of Sophie of Mecklenburg-Güstrow, wife of Frederick II of Denmark. His name is sometimes written as "William Van der Vaus".

In 1587 he came to London with letters for the Earl of Leicester from Frederick II.

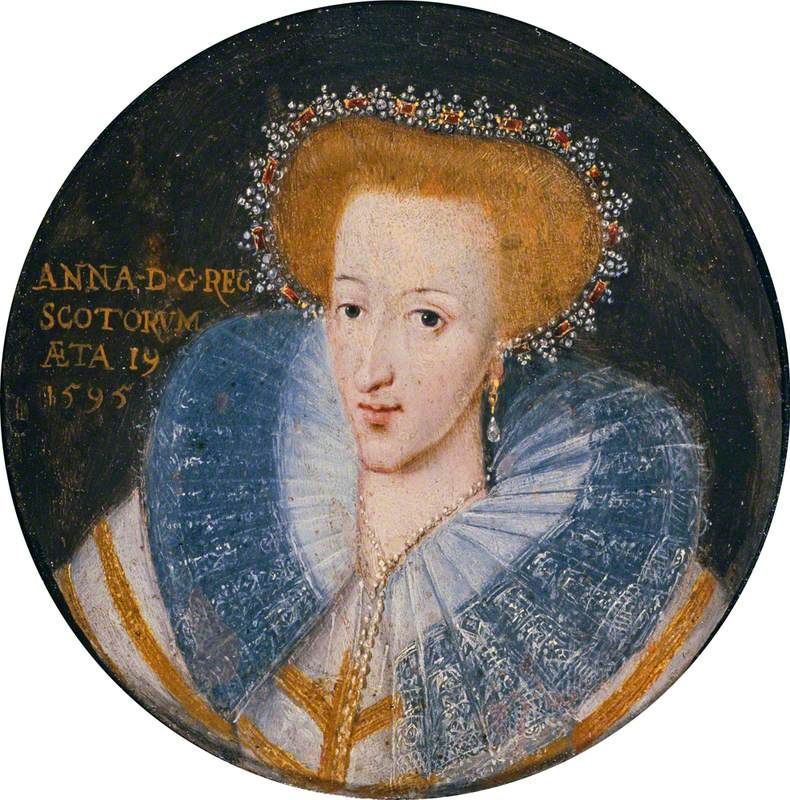
Anne of Denmark, studio of Adrian Vanson

In 1589 he became master of household to Sophie's daughter, Anne of Denmark, the bride of James VI of Scotland. He came to Scotland with Anne of Denmark in May 1590 to ensure her well-being while she was learning the Scots language.

He left his post in Scotland in October 1590, first travelling to the English court as a diplomat. James VI gave him instructions to discuss a Protestant league in Europe with his Anne of Denmark's relations. Colonel William Stewart wrote to William Cecil about this mission. Wense travelled to England with Gotthard, Count of Starhemberg (1563-1624).

On his return to Denmark, he reported to Sophie of Mecklenburg-Güstrow on the situation of her daughter in Scotland. Sophie wrote from Koldinghus on 23 November 1590, and again on 1 July 1591 from Kronborg to the Scottish chancellor, John Maitland of Thirlestane, thanking him for his foresight and the care he had taken in making arrangements and provisions for the queen's household.

Wilhelm von der Wense, like other German and Danish nobles, signed several autograph books.

== Name variants ==
His name appears in several versions in Scottish records, including "William Vanderwant" or "Vandervantt".
