= Assured Scots =

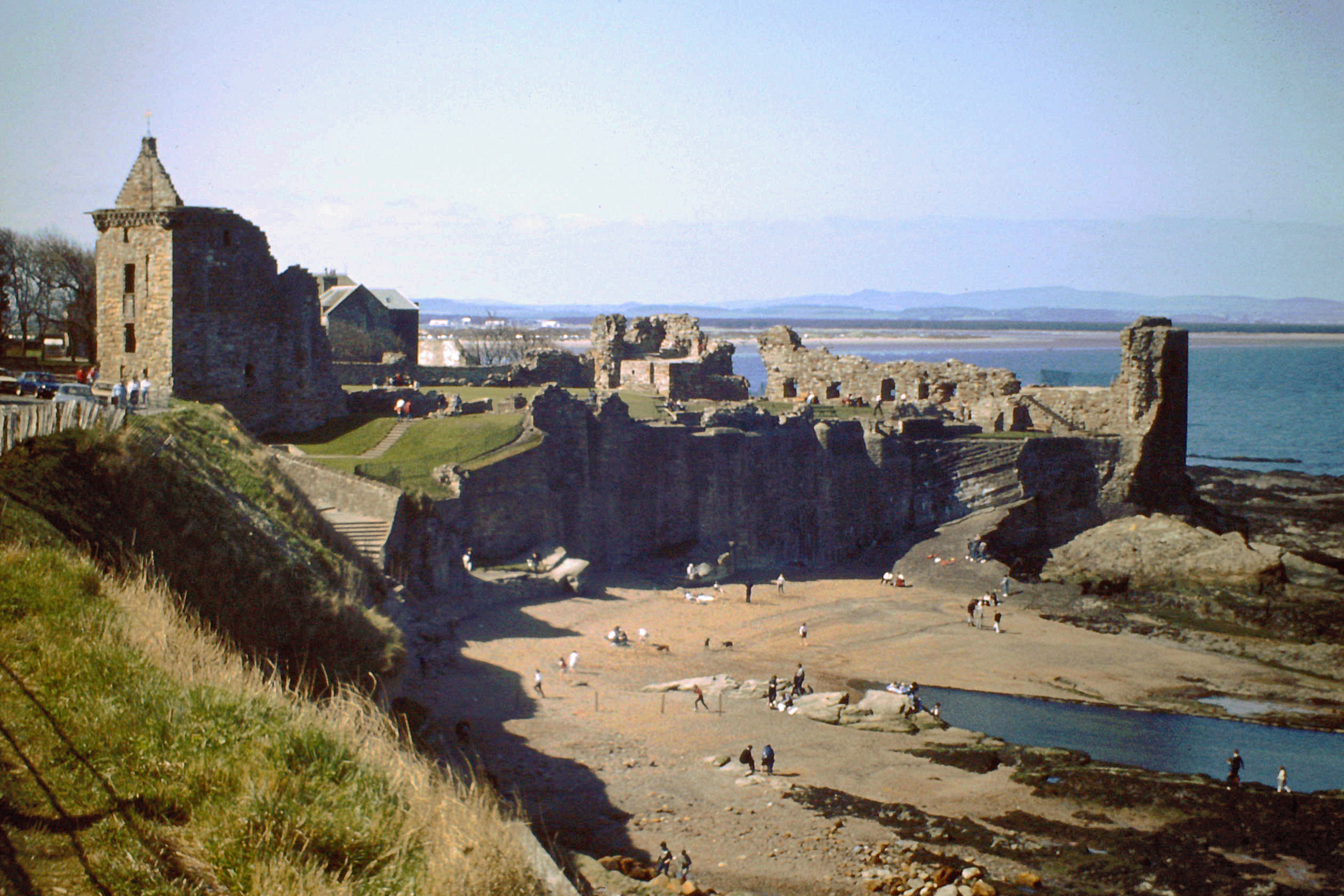
Henry Balnaves drafted a bond for assured Scots during the siege of St Andrews Castle.

Assured Scots were Scottish people who pledged to support English plans for Mary, Queen of Scots to marry Edward VI of England during the war of the Rough Wooing between 1543 and 1550. They took "assurances" and some received English pension money. Their motivations varied, and included favouring amity with England and their support for Protestant faith while Scotland was a Catholic country.

== Prequel ==
In October 1542, a Scottish army was defeated at battle of Solway Moss near Longtown and Sandysike in England. A number of Scottish noblemen and lairds were captured. These gave assurances to Henry VIII, and many were released on licence and sent a substitute family member as a pledge or hostage into captivity in England, after undertaking to support English policy. In March 1544, Henry VIII sent a herald to demand the return to English captivity of a number of these Scottish nobles who were not acting in accord with his wishes.

== Assured Scots ==
James V of Scotland died in December 1542, and he was succeeded by his baby daughter Mary. Scotland was ruled by Regent Arran. Henry VIII asked his border wardens to start taking assurances from Scots to be "taken as our friends" who would further the marriage between Edward and Mary early in 1543. Soon after, the marriage plan was accepted by Arran's government under the Treaty of Greenwich. When this fell through, Henry VIII sent an army to burn Edinburgh in May 1544. This war has become known as the "Rough Wooing". The English border warden William Eure took "assurances" from Scottish borderers in June 1544. Assured Scots undertook to support and supply English garrisons in Scotland.

Scots near Langholm were compelled to assure by an English garrison. Some Scottish lairds made oaths to support England after the battle of Pinkie in 1547. Assured Scots at Lauder helped or facilitated the English to build and supply forts at the site of Thirlestane Castle and at Roxburghe. Some Scots took part in raids and wore an English red cross. Admiral Clinton wrote that the presence of the English fort at Broughty Castle would cause more people in the Dundee and Tay area to "shortly come in" and be assured.

James Maitland wrote of his grandfather, Richard Maitland of Lethington, "most part of the Gentlemen of Lothian, Merse, and Teviotdale did assure, but my grandfather would not assure". An English commander, Thomas Holcroft wrote of the "King's Pale" in Scotland, anticipating that Edward VI would receive feudal rents from the occupied area of Southern Scotland, extending from Dunglass to Berwick, and Lauder to Dryburgh. Landowners would be replaced by a Scottish "assured man" or an English landlord who would "answer the king's majesty for the rents of the same".

The names of around 950 assured Scots can be identified. Most lived in areas affected by the war, near the borders or Dundee, where Broughty Castle held an English garrison. Notable assured Scots who were active during the war include; Ninian Cockburn; his older brother John Cockburn of Ormiston; Alexander Crichton of Brunstane; Michael and Henry Durham; Elizabeth Lamb, Prioress of St Bathans; Hugh Douglas of Longniddry; the Armstrongs of Mangerton; George Turnbull of Bedrule; James Douglas of Cavers; and others.

Some assured Scots changed their minds and asked the Arran government for a pardon as the war progressed, and a remission of charges of treason was offered to assured Scots who came forward. English observers felt that the assured Scots were not value for money, especially as French troops were able to manoeuvre in East Lothian and maintain the siege of Haddington without much hindrance. After a defeat at Haddington, Thomas Fisher, an English officer, wrote:

How had it been possible for such a power as the French and Almains [Germans] were, not under 3,000 or above as is reported, to come in the night time through our Assured Men's towns from Musselburgh to Haddington? and never a one of them should hear either of them coming or passing, as they say they did not, or I as think, they would not, although in my judgement a good part of them knew full well of the intended enterprise; and if they did hear, or were privy thereunto, why had they not let it be known by some means to the captain of Haddington?

William Lauder, a burgess of Lauder, was beheaded in July 1549 for supplying and helping the English garrison at Lauder, and carrying messages for the commander Hugh Willoughby. As the war came to end, only a few assured Scots were punished, some were forced into exile, but several were allowed to pay fines (compositions) for their remissions. Around 193 townspeople in Dundee were ordered to pay fines in March 1553 for working with the English and with Henry Durham, and for activities related to the siege of St Andrews Castle.

== Protestant reformers and assurance ==
One Scottish religious reformer Henry Balnaves, drafted a form of an assurance bond in December 1546, which began:

God, the author and finisher of peace, beholding the long discord between the realms, has in our days appointed opportunity for union of the two in one empire by the blessed sacrament of matrimony between young Prince Edward of England and our Sovereign Lady Mary Queen of Scotland; and by consent of the Parliament of this realm, at their suit made by certain ambassadors sent to the said invincible Prince Henry, etc., an honorable treaty of peace and contract of marriage was confirmed under the Great Seal of the realm, but afterwards broken by the Governor and evil council, specially the Cardinal sometime of Saint Andrews

While some of the assured Scots were closely associated with Protestant reform, a majority were motivated by profit and the need to survive in the presence of an enemy.
