= William Douglas of Whittingehame =

Scottish judge, died 1595

William Douglas of Whittingehame (c. 1540 – 17 December 1595) was a Senator of the College of Justice at Edinburgh, and a Royal conspirator.

== Family ==
William Douglas was the eldest son and heir of William Douglas of Whittingehame (died bef. 24 August 1557) and his spouse Elizabeth (d. after 24 August 1557), daughter of Sir Robert Lauder of The Bass (d.1517/18) by his spouse, Elizabeth Lawson.

The Douglases of Whittingehame near Haddington, East Lothian, had held the estate from before the 1500s.

== Career ==
He obtained, following the Scottish Reformation, on 17 August 1560 a charter of the ecclesiastical lands at Whittingehame from Claud Hamilton, then Dean of Dunbar. This grant included "8 husbandlands (208 acres) and four 'terras' cottages in the 'villa' of Whittinghame". He joined the Lords of the Congregation and seems to have been frequently employed by the General Assembly of the Church of Scotland in their communications with Mary, Queen of Scots and the Privy Council of Scotland.

It is said that the plot to murder Mary's husband, Lord Darnley, was discussed at length in the grounds of Whittinghame Castle early in 1566. The Privy Council cited William Douglas of Whittinghame, brother to Master Archibald Douglas, Parson of Douglas, as one of the conspirators in the murder of David Rizzio, for which he was pardoned on 24 December 1566. In 1567 he joined the Association for the Preservation of James VI.

Whittingehame prospered under Regent Morton. Prior to 20 October 1575 he was appointed an Ordinary Lord in the College of Justice. On 9 January 1579 he and his brother Archibald were excused attendance at court due to Archibald's illness, which was thought to be so serious that his brother should not leave him.

After the fall of Regent Morton in March 1581, Whittingehame was threatened with torture by the boot, a device to crush the victim's leg, as were other servants of the Earl of Angus and Morton including George Auchinleck. The inquiry was intended to find Morton guilty of the murder of Lord Darnley. Whittingehame offered to implicate others, provided he gained a remission for himself. The English ambassador Thomas Randolph was deeply disappointed with Whittingehame's compliance with the new regime, and disavowal of the letters he had recently brought from England which painted Esmé Stewart in a bad light. Whittingehame proclaimed the letters forgeries made his brother Archibald. The confessions of Whittingehame and his colleagues led to the execution of Morton.

On 26 August 1582 he was cited in the Privy Council as one of the 'Ruthven Raiders'.

He resigned his position at the College of Justice prior to 1 August 1590, on which day his son and heir Archibald was presented to it by King James VI, although these positions were not hereditary.

== Diplomat ==
Lord Herries's Historical Memoirs mentions that William Douglas was sent in 1564 to Denmark and discussed a levy paid by Scottish merchants visiting Gdansk. Material given on behalf of his grandson, the Field Marshal Robert Douglas, Count of Skenninge, to the Swedish genealogical authorities, mention that this William, laird of Whittinghame, was sometime (perhaps around 1590) during the reign of James VI of Scotland, a Scots envoy to king Christian IV of Denmark and Norway (whose sister James VI married) (ref: Elgenstierna).

== Marriage ==
William Douglas married in 1566 Elizabeth (d. after 6 August 1608 when she was described as his 'relict'), daughter of Sir Richard Maitland of Lethington by his spouse Mariotta, daughter of Sir Thomas Cranstoun of Corsbie. They had six sons and two daughters. Of them:

- Sir Archibald Douglas of Whittinghame, Senator of the College of Justice, who married in 1597, Helen Lumsden, and died between 1630 – 1642 with no issue. He settled Whittingehame upon his niece Isobel's husband, Sir Arthur Douglas, a grandson of William Douglas, 6th Earl of Morton.
- Patrick Douglas of Standingstone, East Lothian (witnessed a Sasine to "his brother german" Archibald on 7 May 1596), whose son, Field Marshal Robert Douglas, Count of Skenninge, friherre (baron) of Skalby, Sweden, was a commander in later stages of Thirty Years War. Patrick was maternal grandfather to Sir Robert Lauder of Beilmouth.
- James Douglas, described in November 1648 as a secretary to King James. He donated books to the University of Edinburgh, including two that had belonged to John Craig.
- Richard Douglas of Newgrange, East Lothian, and Brockholes, Berwickshire (alive 7 May 1596, when he witnessed a Sasine to "his brother german", Archibald).
- Sir William Douglas of Stoneypath, near Garvald (d. between 1628 and 1642), whose son-in-law Sir Arthur Douglas, Knt., was eventual heir of Whittingehame.
- Margaret Douglas married Robert Sinclair of Longformacus.
- Elizabeth Douglas (d. 1594), who married Samuel Cockburn of Templehall. She is thought to have been the author "E. D." who composed two sonnets addressed to the poet and secretary of Anne of Denmark, William Fowler. Fowler wrote an epitaph in 1594 for her. It has also been suggested that "E. D" was Elizabeth Douglas, Countess of Erroll.
- John Douglas, Minister of Canonbie, 1606.
