= Richard Brooke (Norton) =

English landowner and navy officer

Richard Brooke or Broke (died 1569) was an English landowner and navy officer.

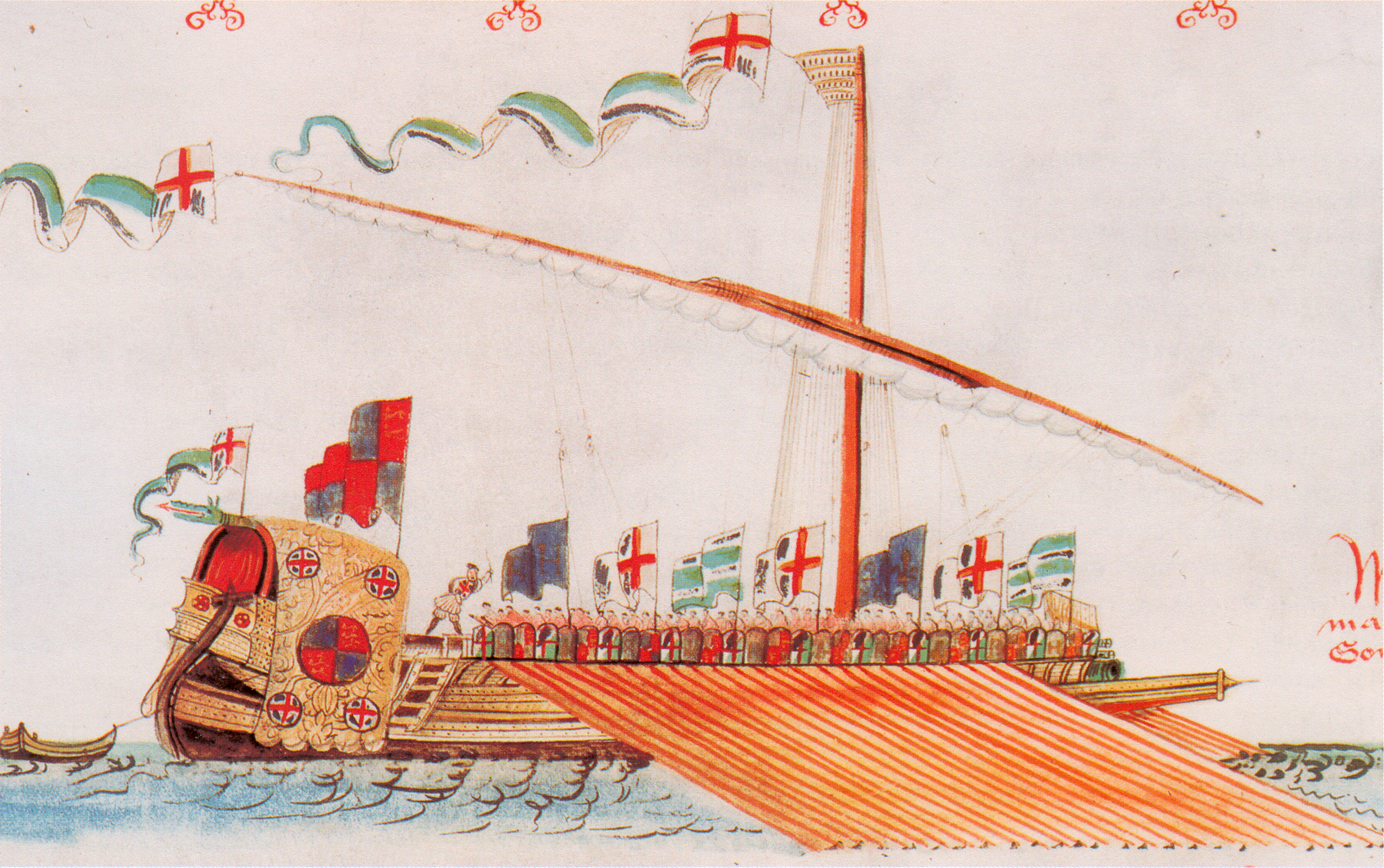
Richard Brooke was captain of the Galley Subtle (depicted in the Anthony Roll), he captured Inchgarvie in 1544 and bombarded the field of Pinkie.

== Early life ==
Richard Brooke was the younger son of Thomas Brooke of Leighton in Nantwich Hundred and Elizabeth, a daughter of Hugh Starkey of Oulton. Starkey was a Gentleman Usher to Henry VIII.

== Knights of Malta ==
Brooke became a soldier and was admitted as a Knight of Malta in 1531. Hugh Starkey's son Oliver Starkey was also a Knight of Malta. Brooke became Commander of the Mount St. John Preceptory in North Yorkshire. After the suppression of the Order in England by Henry VIII circa 1542, Brooke was relieved of his religious vows and held the office of Vice-Admiral of England, a jurisdiction on the Cheshire coast.

== Scotland and the Galley Subtle ==
In May 1544, during the war now known as the Rough Wooing, Brooke served in Lord Hertford's army in Scotland which sacked and burnt Edinburgh. Brooke captured and destroyed the fortress on the island of Inchgarvie in the Galley Subtle on 6 May 1544.

In September 1547 an English navy commanded by Lord Clinton comprising 34 warships with 26 support vessels sailed to Scotland. The Galley Subtle, captained by Richard Brooke, bombarded the Scottish army at the battle of Pinkie. William Patten included the ship in one of his plans of the battlefield, depicted in the woodcut with its oars visible, close to Musselburgh.

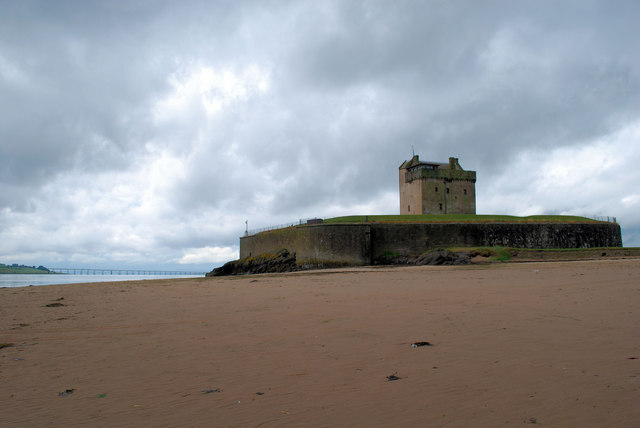
Broughty Castle

The galley was used because it could be rowed near the shore to fire its ordnance. The galley crew included condemned prisoners from London jails whose sentences were commuted to sea service. The guns of the ships in English fleet were recorded in an inventory. The Galley Subtle carried two brass demi-cannons, two brass Flanders demi-culverins, breech-loading iron double basses and single basses. The ship was also called the Rose or Red Galley.

After Pinkie, on 15 September Broke and the Galley Subtle rowed up the River Forth to Blackness Castle. After an exchange of fire he captured the Mary Willoughby, the Anthony of Newcastle and the Bosse, and burnt other ships. Next, an "assured Scot" Michael Durham and the English commander Andrew Dudley sailed in the galley from Leith to Broughty Castle and fired three shots at the castle. The castle surrendered to Dudley as pre-arranged.

== Manor of Norton ==
Richard Brooke bought the manor of Norton, near Runcorn, Cheshire from Henry VIII in 1545 following the dissolution of the monasteries. The manor included the former monastery of Norton Priory and the settlements of Norton, Stockham, Acton Grange and Aston Grange in Cheshire, and Cuerdley in Lancashire.

== Later life ==
Following the dissolution of the monasteries, the abbey of Norton Priory was made inhospitable. Having bought the property, it seems that Brooke did not have the resources necessary to build an expensive house and therefore he modified the west range of the abbey as his residence, while the cloister became a rubbish dump. The remaining buildings and the church were demolished and sold for building stone.

Following the accession of Queen Mary to the throne in 1553, Brooke assisted Reginald Pole in the re-establishment of the Order of St John in England. Brooke was Sheriff of Cheshire in 1563. He was succeeded at Norton Priory by his eldest son, Thomas.

== Family ==
He married Christian, daughter of John Carew of Haccombe in Devon. The genealogy of the family is variously reported. Their children or grandchildren included.

- Thomas Brooke of Norton (died 1622), who married (1) Anne, daughter of Henry Tuchet, 10th Baron Audley, (2) Elizabeth (died 1604), daughter of William Marbury, (3) Eleanor Gerrard
- Mary Brooke, who married Richard Brereton
- Elizabeth Brooke, who married (1) Lancelot Bartlett, (2) Cynwrig Eyton of Eyton, Denbigshire
- Christian Brooke, who married Richard Grosvenor of Eaton and was the mother of Sir Richard Grosvenor, 1st Baronet, the ancestor of the Dukes of Westminster.
- Martha Brooke, who married Hugh Starkey of More

After the death of Richard Brooke in 1569, his widow married Ralph Done of Flaxyards.
