= Michael Durham =

Scottish courtier and physician

Michael Durham was a Scottish courtier and physician to King James V. His family was from Grange at Monifieth near Dundee.

== Death of a king ==
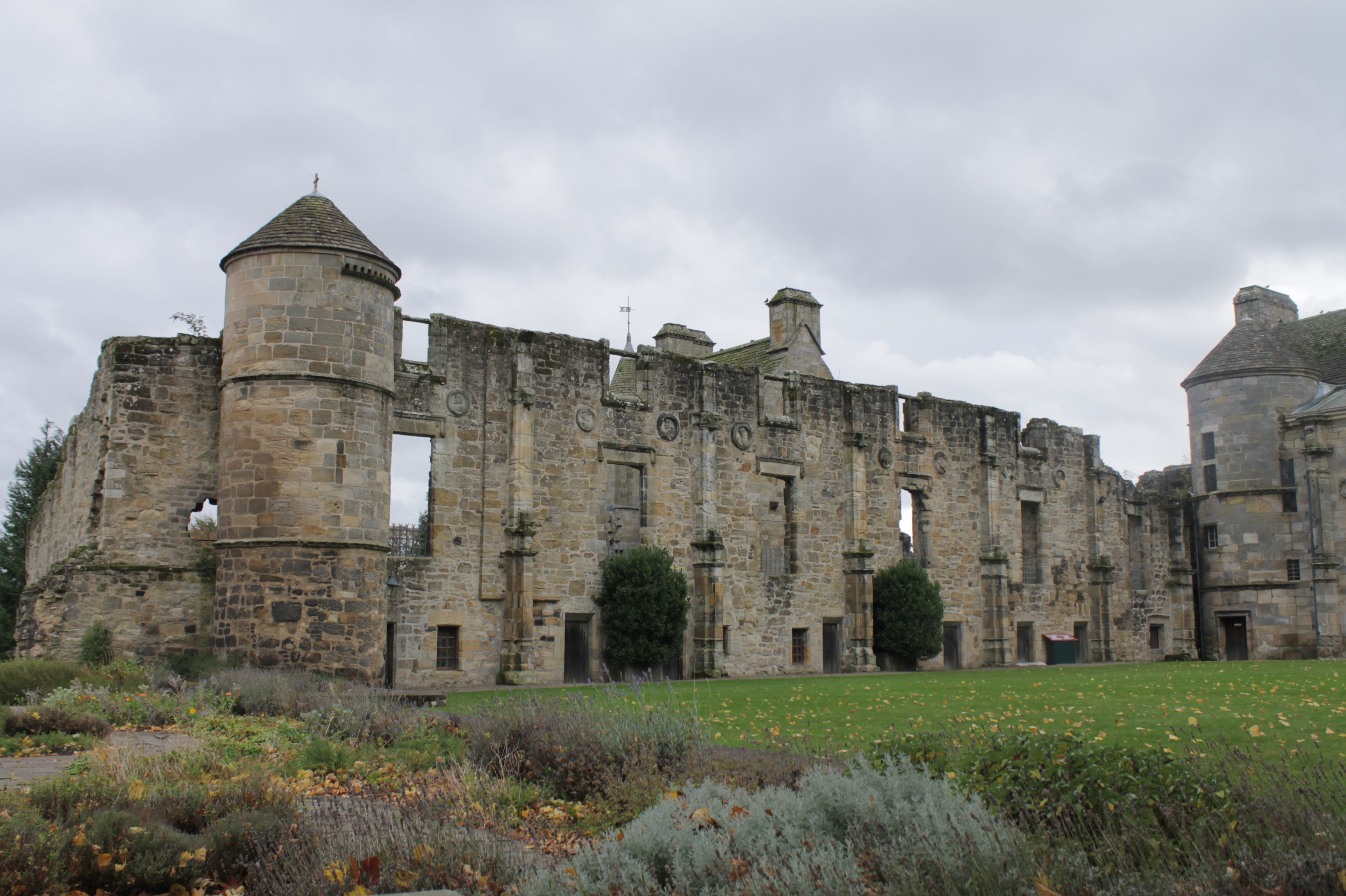
Falkland Palace

Durham took his first degree at the University of St Andrews. He was given a salary of £100 Scots as the royal physician or "doctour in medicyne". He attended James V at Falkland Palace during his final illness in December 1542. He was a witness to the king's will, a legal instrument made at Falkland appointing tutors for Mary, Queen of Scots. The document was declared invalid.

Regent Arran paid Durham's expenses of £200 Scots for his medical work, and gave him a gown furred with Scottish "martrick" or marten fur from the royal wardrobe. At first, according to John Knox, the counsel of Durham and other Protestants was welcomed at the Regent's court. Soon, however, these courtiers were removed.

René-Aubert Vertot, an 18th-century editor of the letters of Antoine de Noailles, mentions that suspicion fell on Durham for poisoning James V. There were rumours that the king's demise was hastened by poison or the wrong medicine. Modern historians believe James died of natural causes. A rumour of poisoning was current days after the death, reaching English authorities. John Lesley wrote that James V was "vexit by some unkindly medicine". A translator of Lesley's Latin History wrote that the common people thought "the king sooner died through medicine, than otherwise he would have done". Raphael Holinshed and David Calderwood wrote of reports that James V was "disquieted by some unkindlie medicine".

== War ==
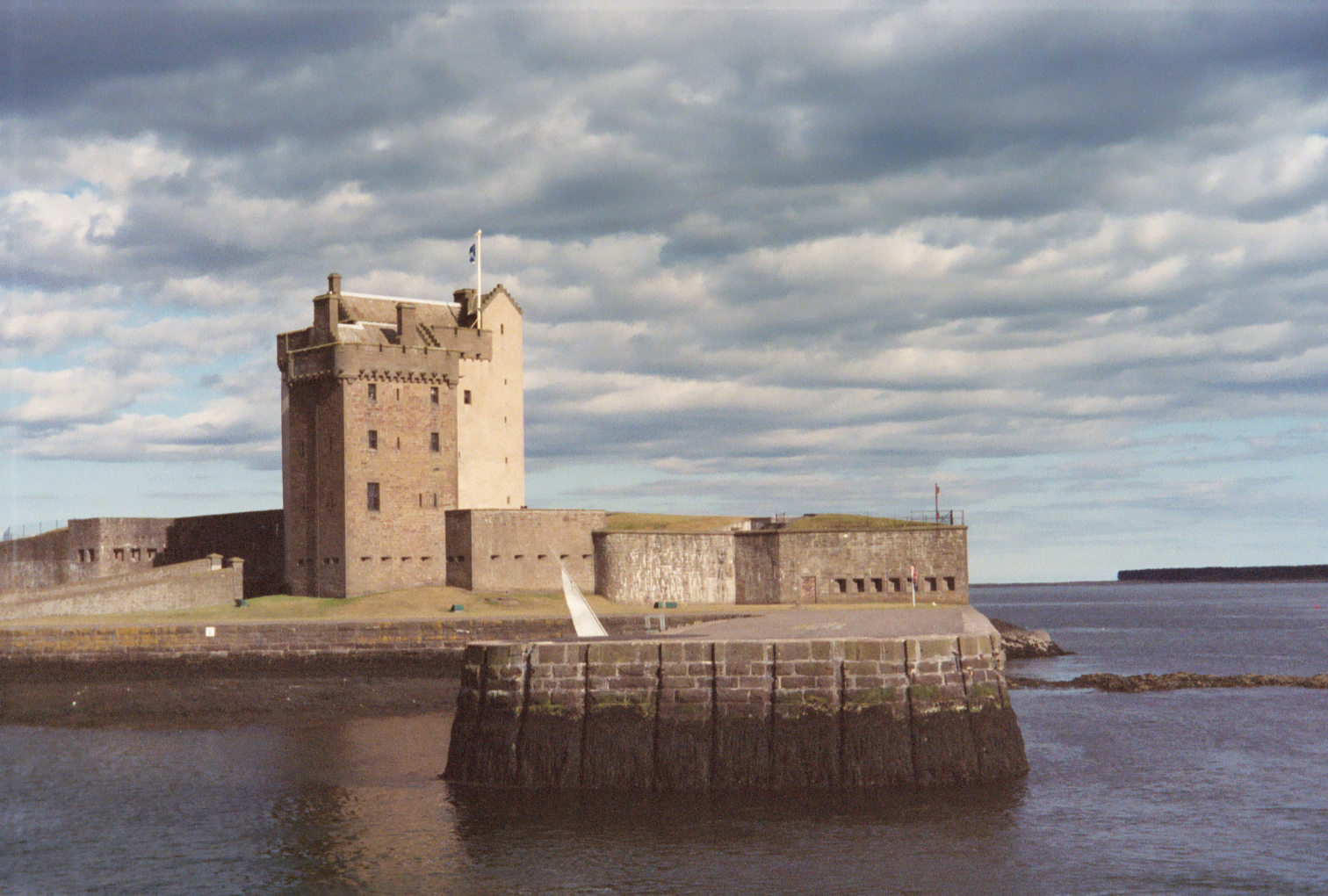
The Durham brothers were present at the surrender of Broughty Castle in September 1547

Michael Durham and his brother Henry Durham were Protestants who sided with England during the war now known as the Rough Wooing. Henry Durham was involved in an attack on the Franciscan and Dominican Friaries in Dundee in August 1543, during a short period when Regent Arran adopted a Protestant outlook. These months are known as Arran's "Godly Fit".

In August 1546, Regent Arran had Michael Durham imprisoned for a time in Edinburgh Castle. Durham then went to London. The Scottish diplomat Adam Otterburn was surprised that he had been released and allowed to travel.

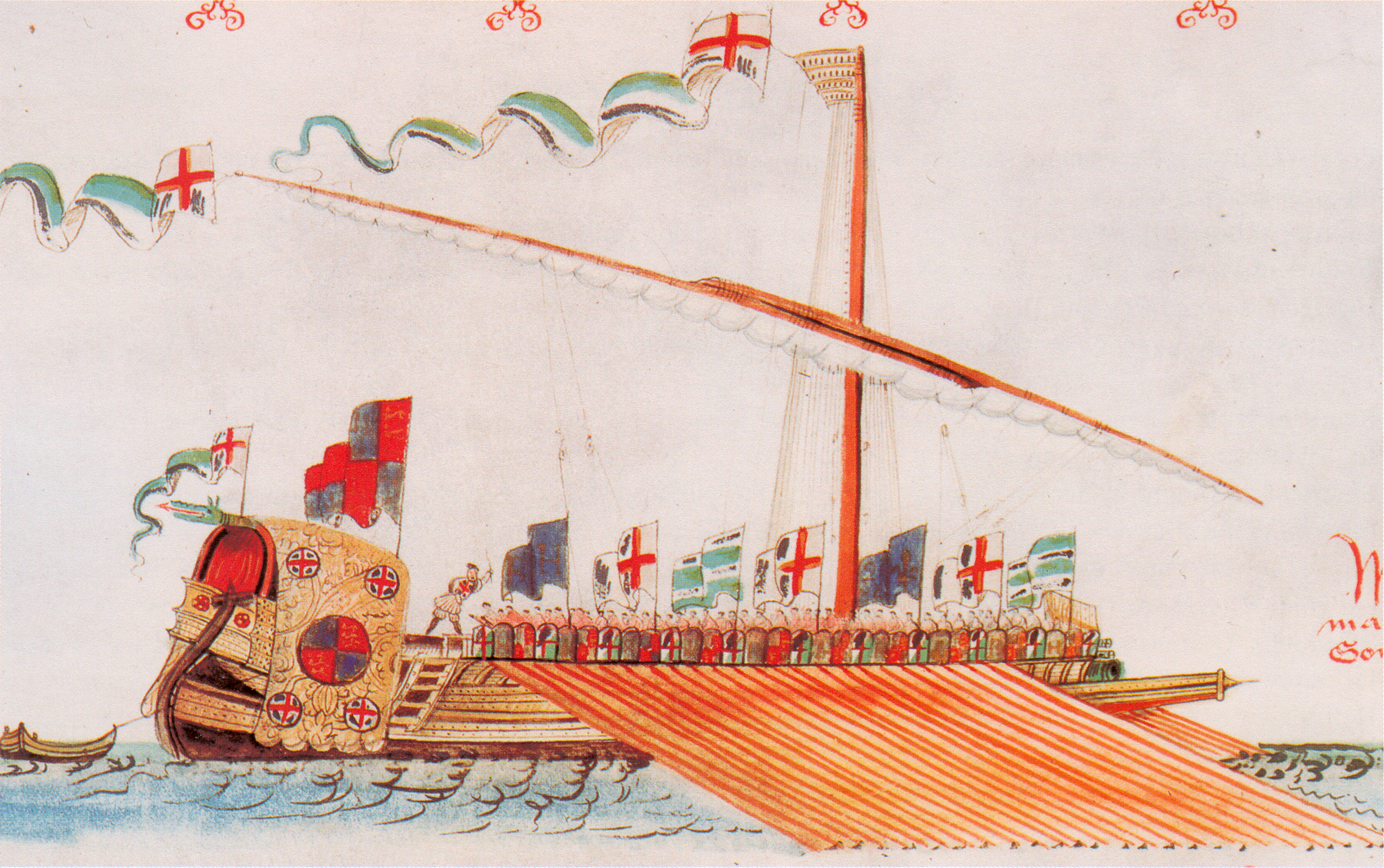
The Galley Subtle depicted in the Anthony Roll

After the battle of Pinkie in September 1547, Michael Durham accompanied the English commander Andrew Dudley from Leith to Broughty Castle. They sailed in the Galley Suttill or Subtle with Richard Brooke and fired three shots at the castle. Henry Durham, who was a retainer of Lord Gray, and Captain of Broughty, surrendered the castle to Dudley. The galley was used because it could be rowed near the shore to fire its ordnance.

Ralph Sadler gave Doctor Durham a reward of £10. Henry and Michael Durham, as "assured Scots", were given an English pension of £50 and trading privileges. The head of the family, William Durham of Grange, was later given a pardon or remission for helping the English at Broughty Castle and the nearby fort at "Brakehill".

== London ==
Michael Durham returned to London. He received a pension from the English exchequer, granted by Edward VI of England. He became a friend of the French ambassador Antoine de Noailles, aiding him with intelligence and in diplomatic matters. Durham carried or forwarded some of Noailles's letters to Henri Cleutin in Scotland. Noailles tried to rehabilitate Durham with Mary of Guise, the widow of James V who ruled Scotland from 1554 to 1560.

An "assize" concerning Doctor Durham was held in Edinburgh in October 1555. In March 1557, the English diplomat Nicholas Wotton described Durham as a spy for France and Mary of Guise, receiving a pension from her of 300 crowns.
