= George Douglas of Longniddry =

George Douglas of Longniddry (floruit 1580 – 1610) was a Scottish landowner and courtier.

== Family background ==
He was the son of Francis Douglas of Borg and Elizabeth Fairlie. His father's tutor was John Knox, and he joined Knox in St Andrews Castle in 1547.

The lands of this branch of the Douglas family were at Longniddry in East Lothian. Hugh or Huw Douglas of Longniddry, his uncle, became a supporter of pro-English policy during the war of the Rough Wooing, although his support for the English occupation of Scotland was doubted. When the English army came to Longniddry before the battle of Pinkie in September 1547, the Duke of Somerset heard that Hugh's pregnant wife was in the house. He ordered her to be protected from looters, although William Patten said some of the soldiers from the north of England ignored the order. In November 1547 Hugh Douglas wrote to the Duke of Somerset offering support. When Somerset captured Hailes Castle in February 1548 he made Hugh Douglas its keeper. Their castle at Longniddry was probably demolished on the orders of the governor, Regent Arran. In August 1548 Hugh Douglas was reconciled with Arran, and Arran slighted Hailes by removing the yetts so the English could not garrison the place.

In 1564 Lord Seton and William Maitland of Lethington disputed the affairs of Francis Douglas of Longniddry. Seton hurt Longniddry. The Earl of Morton sided with Lethington and the Laird of Longniddry. Francis's kinsman, George Douglas, was involved in the murder of David Rizzio in March 1566.

== Servant of Anne of Denmark ==
George Douglas was in Denmark with James VI in 1590. He became a servant of Anne of Denmark, wife of James VI.

In July 1594 he was sent to England with Richard Cockburn of Clerkington and James Bellenden to ask Queen Elizabeth for sudsidy money. He returned to Edinburgh on 19 August and told the English ambassador Robert Bowes that he had seen wagons with presents for the baptism of Prince Henry at Berwick-upon-Tweed. James VI sent to him meet the Earl of Sussex on the road and request that he would hurry up.

In September 1594 he was a captain of horsemen in the army sent to the north of Scotland against the rebel earls. He carried a letter from Anne of Denmark, who was ill at Linlithgow Palace, to the king at Stirling Castle in July 1595.

When Anne of Denmark came to Stirling Castle in May 1603 to collect Prince Henry and was refused, she sent George Douglas as her messenger to King James in London. King James read the letter and heard George Douglas's report of the incident, and he sent the Duke of Lennox to Stirling.
