= Archibald Douglas, Parson of Douglas =

Scottish judge and diplomat

Archibald Douglas, Parson of Douglas, (b. before 1540 – d. 1603) was also Parson of Glasgow, a Senator of the College of Justice, Ambassador to Queen Elizabeth I of England, and a notorious intriguer.

== Career ==
As a clergyman and Master of Arts, he was known as Mr Archibald Douglas throughout his career. He was Parson of Douglas, Lanarkshire, prior to 15 January 1561/2 when he was awarded the income of the Third of the Benefices for that parish. He was appointed to the College of Justice on 13 November 1565 as an Extraordinary Lord in place of Adam Bothwell, Bishop of Orkney.

=== Reign of Mary Queen of Scots ===
Accused with his brother, William Douglas of Whittingehame, of involvement in the conspiracy to murder David Riccio, he was obliged to retire to France for some time. But the husband of Mary, Queen of Scots, Henry Stuart, Lord Darnley, secured his return to Scotland, where Douglas then successfully negotiated the pardons of the other conspirators, gazetted on 25 December 1566.

He then entered into the intrigues of James Hepburn, 4th Earl of Bothwell for the assassination of Darnley, and acted as the agent between them and the Earl of Morton. According to the on-the-scaffold confession of his servant Thomas Binning, he was actually present at Kirk o' Field on the night of the murder (9/10 February 1567). In the confusion of the hour Douglas lost his shoes, which he had removed, which were found in the morning and known to be his. No pursuit was however, at that time, instituted against him. Later Morton said that Archibald and his brother Robert had helped find the Casket Letters. When George Dalgleish was threatened with torture he asked to speak to Archibald, and showed Robert where he had hidden the letters.

On 2 June 1568, he was raised to a Lord Ordinary in the College of Justice in place of John Leslie, Bishop of Ross. Archibald was often sent as a messenger to England. He caused concern in January 1569 at Allerton when he let slip that he already knew that Mary was going to be transferred from Bolton Castle to Tutbury Castle, which was meant to be secret.

In September 1570 Regent Lennox sent him to the Earl of Sussex, Governor of Berwick upon Tweed to congratulate him on his victory over the Border friends of Mary, Queen of Scots, and to negotiate support for the Regent's authority. Shortly afterwards he obtained the Parsonage of Glasgow, but with some difficulty as the Kirk at first felt him to be unqualified. In January 1572, however, the requisite sanction was obtained, and he received the Thirds of Benefices for Newlands, Glasgow thereafter.

=== Siege of Edinburgh Castle ===
In April 1572 he was arrested following the discovery that he was assisting the party of Mary, Queen of Scots and Sir William Kirkcaldy of Grange who held Edinburgh Castle, by bringing money sent from the Duke of Alba from the Spanish Netherlands. A number of letters in cipher were taken with him.

He was accused of conspiring for the death of the Earl of Morton. The Marshall of Berwick and diplomat Sir William Drury, and his wife, Lady Thame, regretted his arrest because he had plotted with Douglas to kidnap George, Lord Seton, who was negotiating for Mary with the Duke of Alba, and their plan, which included Douglas carrying coded letters from the castle, did not take effect. He was warded (held under house arrest) at Stirling Castle, (another source says Lochleven Castle).

Ten years after these events, the English diplomat Thomas Randolph wrote to Francis Walsingham to certify that Drury had found Mr Archibald a "fit instrument" to secretly negotiate with Grange, William Maitland of Lethington, Melville, and others, especially to persuade them to surrender the castle. This, said Randolph, resulted in his imprisonment at Dumbarton Castle. Drury and Archibald were involved in the sale of Mary's jewels for cash and loans raised against them. Grange's accounts regarding Mary's jewels survived the siege. Douglas, for a time, kept Mary's wedding ring.

=== London ===
He appears to have lived, if not in prison, at least in privacy, during the Regency of Morton. On 11 November 1578 he was restored to his former place on the bench, following a request letter from King James VI to that effect. On 31 October 1580, however, he was denounced to the Privy Council of Scotland as guilty of Darnley's murder, and orders were given for his arrest. But having been forewarned by his kinsman George Douglas of Longniddry, he fled from his wife's tower-house at Morham to England. Queen Elizabeth first agreed to have him returned upon the guarantee of "unsuspect judges and other persons on the assise", but this guarantee could not be given so he remained for the time being in England.

On 28 November 1581, he was forfeited by Act of Parliament for the murder of Lord Darnley, which, they argued, was proved by his flight to England, and the evidence of his servant Thomas Binning, who had, in June 1581, already been executed for the same crime.

In May 1583 he spoke with Francis Walsingham. William Fowler wrote to Walsingham that although Douglas had denied that knew how to write letters in cipher code, he was "well practised in the that art". Mary, Queen of Scots, suspected Douglas, and warned the French ambassador Michel de Castelnau.

Owing to the influence of his friend, the Master of Gray, he returned on a safe-conduct to Scotland, arriving in Edinburgh on 15 April 1586. His (nominal) trial took place on 26 May. He was acquitted. There was great uproar.

=== Diplomacy in London and the Babington Plot ===
As the Babington Plot concerning Mary, Queen of Scots, was revealed, James VI sent Douglas to Elizabeth as a confidential messenger in July 1586. Douglas was to discuss the question of James's claim to the English throne with the Earl of Leicester, and ask for advice about his marriage plans. Mary's secretaries, Claude Nau, Gilbert Curle, and Jérôme Pasquier were arrested in September. The Master of Gray asked Douglas to tell Elizabeth that King James was pleased to hear of the discovery of the plot. He would not mind if her "knavish" servants were hanged, but would not consent to his mother's execution.

Douglas was appointed by James VI his personal Ambassador to Elizabeth, a post he took up in September. He wrote to King James with the new that Mary would be put on trial. Elizabeth, he wrote, had told him she would do justice against the mother, but "do nothing else but advance the son".

He assisted the Master of Gray, William Keith, and Sir Sir Robert Melville to move Elizabeth towards clemency for Mary Queen of Scots. John Mowbray, Laird of Barnbougle, wrote to Douglas encouraging him, saying that otherwise James would revenge his mother's death by waging war.

On 27 January 1587, Douglas sold a plain gold ring with a large table diamond and a brooch with a cross of five diamonds encircled with 21 smaller diamonds to John Cottesford, a London goldsmith for £410.

Archibald Douglas mentions meeting Queen Elizabeth at Theobalds and her promise to sustain him financially. He was at length dismissed from his post as ambassador, being succeeded by Sir Robert Melville.

=== Later years and death ===
A Mr. Archibald Douglas, Archdeacon of Glasgow (in that post prior to November 1596), is mentioned in the Privy Council Registers on 28 October 1598, and again on 4 December 1599, but it is not known if this is the same person.

In January 1601 his sister, Jean Douglas, Lady Saltcoats, wrote to him for fine London cloth for gowns for her daughters, who were of age to married.

In 1601 Douglas wrote a letter to his cousin Richard Douglas which included two anecdotes about rings, designed to discredit his political rivals. The goldsmith and financier Thomas Foulis had selected a ring from a goldsmith in London for Douglas to present as the king's gift to Anthony Bacon, a secretary of the Earl of Essex. Bacon later tried to pawn the ring with the same London goldsmith, who said it was worth only half the amount that Foulis had allowed for in the royal accounts. Both the king and Bacon were cheated. In 1583 James VI had given Francis Walsingham a ring but Walsingham later discovered the stone was a worthless counterfeit. Douglas gave the ring to Roger Aston to return it to Scotland but he claimed it was stolen from him. Aston was "a small friend" to Douglas after this episode.

According to John Chamberlain, Archibald Douglas died in March 1603. "Mr Archibald Douglas" was buried at St Dionis Backchurch on 5 March 1603.

== Family ==
Archibald Douglas married, about 1578, (as her third husband) Jane (d. before August 1599), daughter of Patrick Hepburn, 3rd Earl of Bothwell.
