= John Maitland, 1st Lord Maitland of Thirlestane =

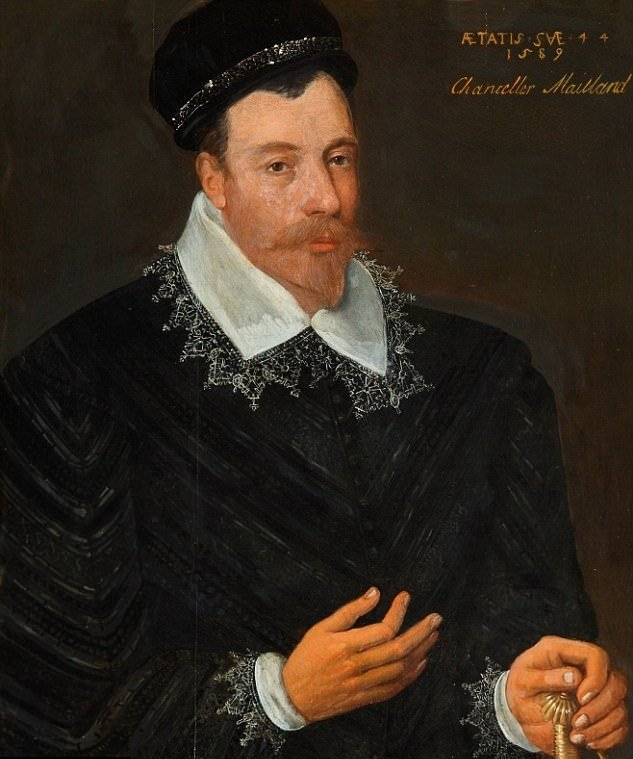
Sir John Maitland, attributed to Adrian Vanson

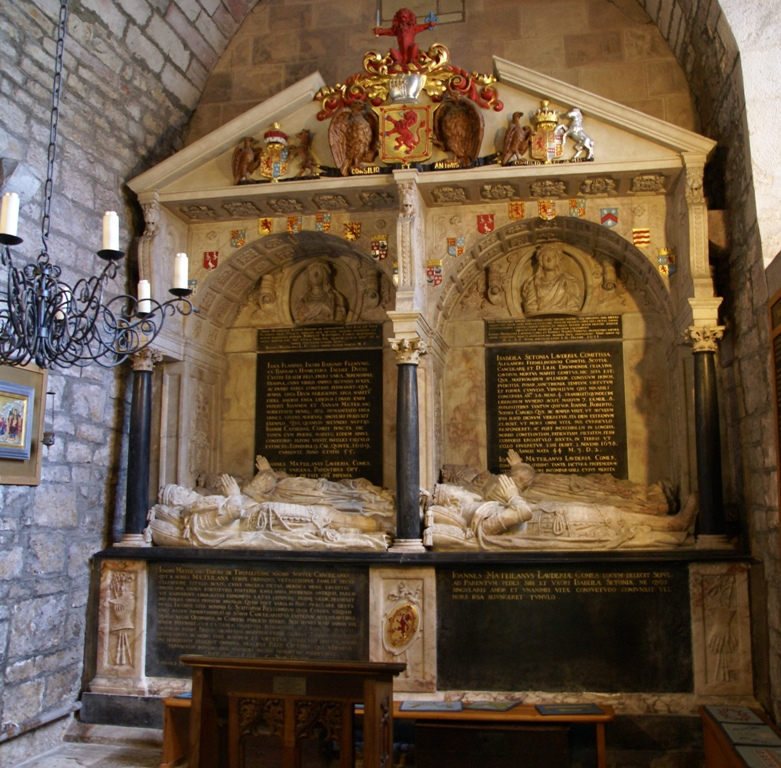
The Maitland tomb, St Mary's Church, Haddington

John Maitland, 1st Lord Maitland of Thirlestane (1537 – 3 October 1595), of Lethington, Knight (1581), was Lord Chancellor of Scotland.

== Life ==
He was the second son of Sir Richard Maitland of Thirlestane, Berwickshire, and Lethington, Haddingtonshire, who settled the lands of Thirlestane upon him, and thereafter sent him abroad for his education.

Through the influence of his brother, William Maitland, upon John Maitland's return, he received the offer of the position of Commendator of Kelso Abbey, which he shortly afterwards exchanged with Francis Stewart, later Earl of Bothwell, for the Priory of Coldingham. This transaction was ratified by Mary, Queen of Scots on 20 April 1567.

Upon the death of his father, he was appointed Keeper of the Privy Seal of Scotland, on 20 April 1567. He also supported Regent Moray and sat in his parliaments in December 1567 and August 1568. On 2 June 1568, he was created a Senator of the College of Justice as an Ordinary Lord on the spiritual side. He retained the rich endowment of Coldingham until 1570.

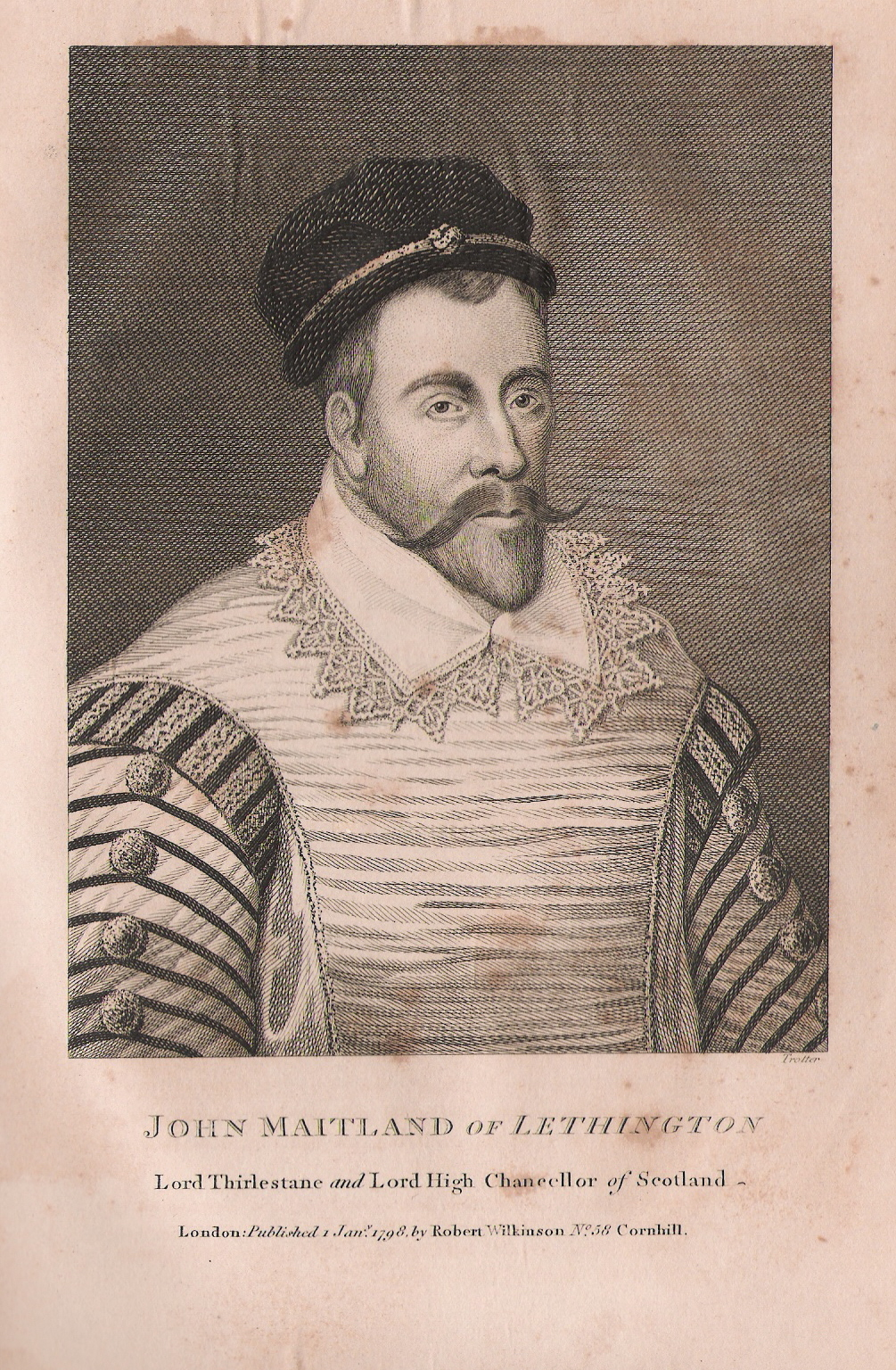
Lord Thirlestane

Following the Regent Moray's assassination, Maitland joined the Lords who met on the Queen's behalf at Linlithgow and shared in the dangers of the civil war which ensued. At the end of 1570, he was denounced a rebel by the King's party with his brothers William and Thomas, and they were all forfeited in the parliament which met in the Canongate, the so-called 'cropped parliament'.

John Maitland was deprived of all his offices and benefices and thereafter took refuge in Edinburgh Castle. Upon its surrender on 29 May 1573, he was sent as a prisoner to Tantallon Castle in Haddingtonshire. After nine months' confinement there, he was removed to Hugh, Lord Somerville's house of Cowthallie, under house arrest with bail at £10,000 Scots. In 1574/5 a Letter of Rehabilitation in his favour, as "Commendator of Coldingham", passed the Great Seal. After the former courtier Francisco de Busso died in 1576, his property in Gray's Close in Edinburgh was transferred to John Maitland.

On 26 April 1581, Maitland was reappointed Keeper of the Privy Seal of Scotland and returned to the Bench. He was shortly afterwards made a Privy Counsellor and, upon the dismissal of Robert Pitcairn, Abbot of Dunfermline, appointed Secretary of Scotland on 18 May 1584. In the parliament which met on the 22nd of that month, his doom of forfeiture was reduced, and he was restored to all the honours, heritages, and offices he had formerly possessed.

On 1 May 1585, plague came to Edinburgh and the king and councillors, including Maitland, went to Dirleton Castle, where their host James Stewart, Earl of Arran entertained them with a sumptuous banquet and a Robin Hood play.

Maitland was appointed Vice-Chancellor on 31 May 1586, and was also appointed Lord Chancellor of Scotland that year following the Earl of Arran's disgrace. The following year saw him granted the barony of Stobo.

In 1589, a powerful combination headed by the Earls of Huntly, Errol, and Bothwell was formed against Maitland. The intention was to meet at Quarryholes, between Leith and Edinburgh, to march in a body to Holyroodhouse, make themselves master of the King's person, and put the Chancellor to death. The King and Maitland were not, however, at Holyroodhouse and the plot failed. Several other plots were formed against him shortly afterwards, but they were all defeated.

== Maitland and Anne of Denmark ==
Maitland at first preferred that James VI marry Catherine of Bourbon. In June 1589, Edinburgh merchants protested against the possibility of James VI marrying Catherine, making "unreverent speeches" about her. They saw economic advantages arising from a Danish marriage. A Danish princess would bring James a larger dowry, as Navarre was now impoverished by war with the Catholic league. James was anxious to avoid taking sides in the French conflict. According to an English observer, Thomas Fowler, Peter Young and William Stewart told James that Catherine was "old and crooked". James was persuaded and Maitland agreed.

Maitland accompanied James VI on his voyage to Norway and Denmark, and was involved in financing and accounting for this journey. He was allowed £3,000 Scots for his own expenses in Denmark, but seems to have been left out of pocket by £17,824. According to Thomas Fowler, Maitland paid for fitting out of one ship of 126 tons and half the cost of another. Lavish provisions and banqueting stuff betrayed the king's secret intention to sail to meet Anne of Denmark. Accounts of Maitland's expenses include the preparation of a ship, the James Royall of Ayr, hired from Robert Jameson, which was equipped with cannon by John Chisholm, painted, and supplied with new banners and red taffeta was stitched on the sails. Carpenters made new storage spaces for the food mentioned by Fowler. There were barrels of English beer and wine from the cellars at Holyrood Palace. A boatman James Lun spent eight days loading the ship and then put the king and his company aboard.

In Oslo, on 27 November, some of the ladies in waiting to Anne of Denmark asked him to join with Jens Nilssøn, Bishop of Oslo to intercede with James VI for the pardon of David Cunningham of Robertland. He had been welcomed at the Danish court after fleeing Scotland in the aftermath of the murder of the Earl of Eglinton in 1586. Maitland and the Danish ladies in waiting had an audience with the king in the Old Bishop's Palace and the laird of Robertland was pardoned.

On 15 December, James VI asked him to give the Danish counsellor Steno Brahe, brother of the astronomer Tycho Brahe, and the young king's lieutenant "Apill Gudlingstarre" or Axel Gyldenstierne gifts of silver plate from his cupboard, and Maitland was to keep the rest. The silver had been a gift to James VI from Queen Elizabeth, supplied by the London goldsmith Richard Martin. James VI ordered Maitland to give jewels to Christian IV and his mother Sophie of Mecklenburg and other royals. These gifts included four great table diamonds and two great rubies set in gold rings which the master of the royal wardrobe William Keith of Delny had brought to Denmark.

Shortly after his return to Scotland, on 18 May 1590, Maitland was made a Lord of Parliament with the title Lord Maitland of Thirlestane. He received £3,000 Scots from King James towards his expenses in Denmark. Anne of Denmark's mother Sophie of Mecklenburg-Güstrow had asked him to set up her daughter's household in Scotland and advise on matters of "honour and benefit." He consulted with Anne at Dunfermline Palace in July 1590 to ask her to appoint a household of ladies and gentlewomen to be about her.

James VI came to Thirlestane Castle on 15 February 1591 to celebrate the marriage of his niece to the laird of Lugton. Sir Robert Ker of Cessford had married his niece Margaret Maitland, and he was able to help Maitland into the favour of Anne of Denmark. Sophie of Mecklenburg sent Maitland a letter of thanks in June 1591, after hearing good reports from Wilhelm von der Wense. James had asked him to resolve issues over pay in the royal households in April 1591 after kitchen staff deserted their posts, and discussed the subject of paying two departing members of the queen's household with either money or livery clothes, and he reminded Maitland of promises he had made to Sophie, writing "Suppose we be not wealthy, let us be proud poor bodies".

A cousin of James VI, Francis Stewart, 5th Earl of Bothwell, was implicated in the North Berwick Witch Trials on 15 April 1591 by the confession of Richie Graham. Anne of Denmark disapproved of the pursuit of the rebel Earl, and blamed Maitland for seeking the "wrack of the king's blood".

Another quarrel grew over her dowry lands. Anne of Denmark believed she was the rightful owner of Musselburgh and Inveresk, lands belonging to Maitland, which were properties of Abbey of Dunfermline south of the River Forth. These lands were transferred to her after a Danish ambassador Dr Paulus Knibbius made representations to Maitland in 1592. She came to resent Maitland's powers and in January 1593 appealed for help against him and his wife, Jean Fleming, who she believed had slandered her and accused her of being complicit with the Earl of Bothwell. In 1594, James VI appealed to her brother Christian IV of Denmark to ask her to take Maitland into her favour again.

In February 1595, his relationship with the queen seems to have improved, and the courtier Roger Aston reported that he had made friends with the queen's council of advisors, men who had previously been his "unfriends". The queen's council included Alexander Seton, Walter Stewart of Blantyre, James Elphinstone and Thomas Hamilton.

In July 1595, Maitland wrote to the Earl of Essex, about their future "diligent intercourse of intelligence" involving the Scottish diplomat Richard Cockburn of Clerkington and Essex's secretary Anthony Bacon. Essex replied that he wrote only with the queen's knowledge, and they would be happy to receive letters from Maitland or Cockburn.

== Death and legacy ==
John Maitland died on 3 October 1595 at Thirlestane Castle, after a month's illness attended by the physician Dr Martin Schöner and the minister Robert Bruce. He was buried in a side chapel on the north side of St. Mary's, Haddington, where a splendid monument, with an epitaph, composed by King James VI, was erected to his memory.

Sir John Scot of Scotstarvet, writing in the seventeenth century, had this to say of the 1st Lord Maitland:

"Mr John Maitland, second brother to Secretary Maitland, after he had studied the laws in France, was preferred to be a Lord of Session by the said Earl of Arran's means, and thereafter became Chancellor. He was one of the Octavians [a name given to eight persons who managed affairs under king James VI], and was created Lord Thirlestane, and was an excellent Latin poet, as his verses inserted in Deliciae poetarum scotorum testify; and King James had such a respect to him, that he made the epitaph engraven on his tomb. Yet the conquest he made of the barony of Liddington [Lethington] from his brother's son, James Maitland, was not thought lawful nor conscientious."

A portrait of John Maitland by Adrian Vanson at Ham House was valued at £2 in 1683. Examination by Caroline Rae in 2016 showed that it was painted over an image of Mary, Queen of Scots.

== Family ==
He was the brother of William Maitland of Lethington, Scottish Secretary of State, and Marie Maitland, considered a scribe of the Maitland Folio and Quarto.

John Maitland married Jean Fleming, daughter of James, 4th Lord Fleming and Barbara Hamilton. The marriage contract was dated 16 January 1582-83, and it probably took place several months after that, likely in Edinburgh, as marriages between two prominent families like these took a time to plan and orchestrate. Their children included:

- Anne (1589–1609) who married Robert Seton, 2nd Earl of Winton (but had no issue)
- John Maitland, 1st Earl of Lauderdale

Peerage of Scotland
New creation	Lord Maitland of Thirlestane; 1590–1595	Succeeded by John Maitland
Political offices
Preceded by Richard Maitland	Keeper of the Privy Seal of Scotland; 1567–1571	Succeeded by George Buchanan
Preceded by George Buchanan	Keeper of the Privy Seal of Scotland; 1581–1583	Succeeded by Walter Stewart
Preceded by Earl of Arran	Lord Chancellor of Scotland; 1586–1595	Succeeded by 3rd Earl of Montrose
Academic offices
Preceded by Patrick Adamson; Archbishop of St Andrews	Chancellor of the University of St Andrews; 1592–1595	Succeeded by John Lindsay of Balcarres, Lord Menmuir
