= Lennoxlove House =

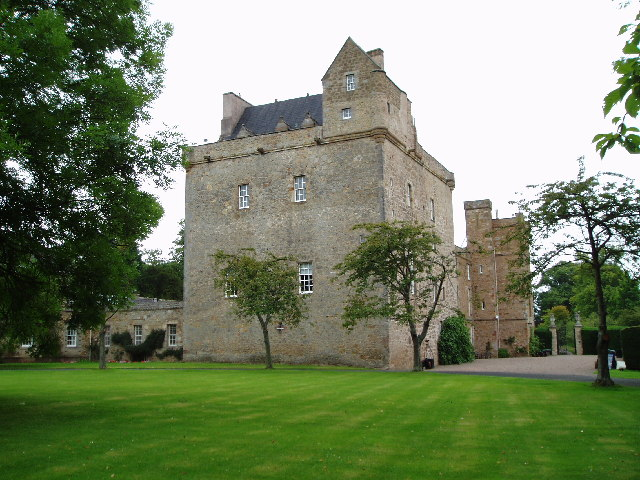
- Lennoxlove, with the original tower house of Lethington in the foreground

- Location in East Lothian
- 55.9389°N 2.7778°W

Listed Building – Category A
- Official name: Lennoxlove House or Lethington
- Designated: 5 February 1971
- Reference no.: LB10814

Inventory of Gardens and Designed Landscapes in Scotland
- Official name: Lennoxlove (Lethington)
- Criteria: Historical and architectural
- Designated: 30 June 1987
- Reference no.: GDL00259

Lennoxlove House is a historic house set in woodlands half a mile south of Haddington in East Lothian, Scotland. The house comprises a 15th-century tower, originally known as Lethington Castle, and has been extended several times, principally in the 17th, 19th and 20th centuries. The house is protected as a category A listed building, and is described by Historic Scotland as "one of Scotland's most ancient and notable houses." The wooded estate is included on the Inventory of Gardens and Designed Landscapes in Scotland, the national listing of significant gardens.

It is now the seat of the Duke of Hamilton and Brandon.

== History ==
The lands of Lethington were acquired by Robert Maitland of Thirlestane in 1345. The Maitland family constructed the earliest part of the building, the L-plan tower house at the south-west of the building. During the war known as the "Rough Wooing", Mary of Guise stayed at Lethington in 1548 when she came to see Haddington with Piero Strozzi, and Regent Arran stayed at Lethington in July 1548. The following year it was burned by the English troops who were then occupying Haddington.

Prominent members of the Maitland family included the poet Richard Maitland (1496–1586), his son William Maitland of Lethington (1525–1573), Secretary of State to Mary, Queen of Scots, and his son James Maitland of Lethington (b.1568). It was then acquired by his uncle, John Maitland, 1st Lord Maitland of Thirlestane (1537–1595), it was said in an underhanded manner. Sir John Scot of Scotstarvet, writing in the seventeenth century, commented thus: "Yet the conquest he made of the barony of Liddington [Lethington] from his brother's son, James Maitland, was not thought lawful nor conscientious." James Maitland had become a Catholic and was obliged to leave Scotland. James VI of Scotland visited John Maitland, who was Chancellor of Scotland, at Lethington on 28 April 1593 to persuade him to return to court.

In 1674, Lennoxlove is said to have been the first Scottish estate to practice "enclosure", dividing the ground into evenly sized rectangular fields.

The coach house was built around 1676, to designs by Sir William Bruce. Lethington remained in the Maitland family until after the death of John Maitland, 1st Duke of Lauderdale (1616–1682) who was born there. Rooms were furnished for his second wife, Elizabeth Maitland, Duchess of Lauderdale. In 1674, her silk lined bedchamber included Indian satin curtains, an Indian screen, and an Indian cabinet. A closet room had a couch with Indian taffeta curtains.

=== Lennoxlove ===
The property was purchased by the trustees of Frances Teresa Stuart, Duchess of Richmond and Lennox following her death in 1702 for the benefit of her "neare and deare kinsman the said Walter Stuart". Walter Stuart was the eldest son of Alexander, 5th Lord Blantyre, the first cousin, twice removed, of the duchess, and was to become the 6th Lord Blantyre on the death of his father in 1704. The Duchess had stipulated that the property be called "Lennox's Love to Blantyre", this was subsequently shortened to Lennoxlove. It remained in the ownership of the Blantyre-Stewarts for almost two centuries. When the 12th Lord Blantyre died in 1900 without male heirs, the property passed into the ownership of his daughter, Ellen Stewart, and her husband Sir David Baird, 3rd Baronet of Newbyth, Prestonkirk. Their younger son, Major William Baird, commissioned the architect Sir Robert Lorimer to oversee extensive refurbishment of the house in 1912.

Lennoxlove is now the seat of the Dukes of Hamilton, having been purchased by the 14th Duke in 1946. It is open to the public during the summer, accommodates corporate events and weddings, and can be rented privately by groups.

== Lennoxlove Book Festival ==
This festival was started in November 2009, and it is being continued in November 2010.

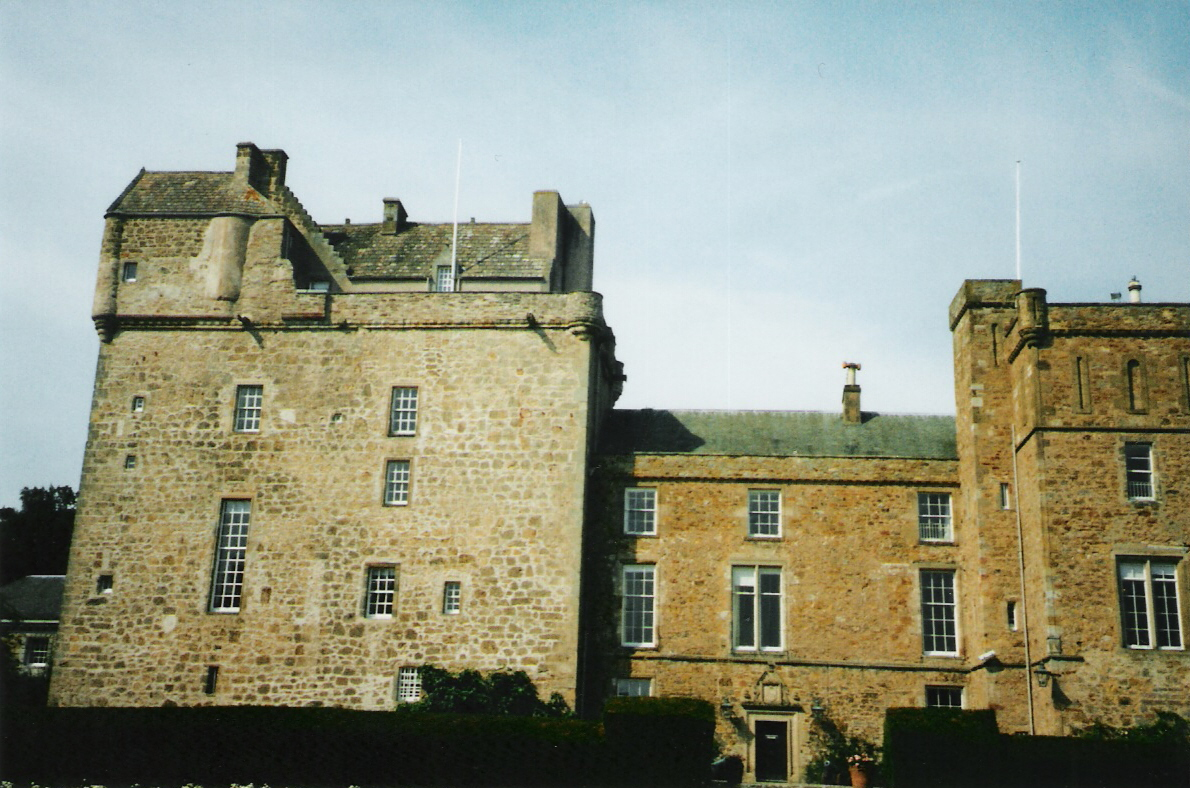
South façade of Lennoxlove House

== Art collection ==
Lennoxlove is home to one of Scotland's most important collections of portraits, including works by Anthony van Dyck, Canaletto, Sir Peter Lely, Sir Godfrey Kneller, Sir Henry Raeburn, and others. It also houses important pieces of furniture, porcelain and other fine artefacts, many of which came from the now demolished Hamilton Palace in Lanarkshire. The collections include the Boulle cabinet given to the Duchess by King Charles II and a silver jewellery box that belonged to Mary, Queen of Scots, that purportedly held the Casket letters showing her complicity in the murder of Lord Darnley, together with her death mask. There is also the map and compass carried by Rudolf Hess, Adolf Hitler's deputy, who flew to Scotland in 1941 on a mission to involve the 14th Duke of Hamilton in helping negotiate peace between Britain and Nazi Germany.

The very rare and important 17-piece Lennoxlove toilet service in silver-gilt can now be seen in the National Museum of Scotland in Edinburgh. It was discovered in its custom travelling-case in a tower room of the house shortly after it changed hands in 1900. It was made in Paris, almost certainly for Frances Teresa Stuart, Duchess of Richmond and Lennox (1647-1702). The pieces come from a number of different makers and years, and the service was assembled around 1672.

== In literature ==
Pamela M. King has attributed the poem Lethington (No. 68 in the 'Maitland Quarto') to Marie Maitland (c.1550 - 1596). She suggests that, as one of Sir Richard's younger children, Marie could still have been living at Lethington Castle, the family home, when it was confiscated in 1571 following her brother William's arraignment for treason, and that the poem is a response to that experience. Joanna Martin has identified Lethington as being one of the earliest of the 'country house' genre of poems.

Marie's brother Thomas Maitland wrote a poem in Latin in praise of Lethington, Domus Ledintona, published in Delitiae Poetarum Scotorum (1637).
