= Corsbie Castle =

16th-century tower house in Scotland

Coordinates: 55.6865°N 2.6257°W

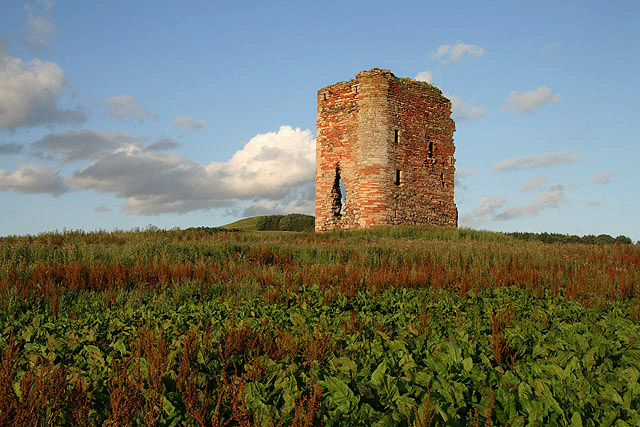
Corsbie Castle

Corsbie Castle is a ruined 16th-century tower house, about 2.5 miles (4.0 km) west of Gordon, Scottish Borders, Scotland, and north of the Eden Water. It was also known as Corsbie Tower. It has been designated as a scheduled monument.

== History ==
The surviving monument represents the remains of a 16th-century tower house, which property belonged to the Cranstons until the middle of the 17th century.

== Structure ==
The castle formerly had five storeys, and a vaulted basement. It is constructed on a raised piece of ground, and is surrounded by a bog on all sides, the only access being by way of a causeway from the north. The castle was oblong, about 40 feet (12 m) by 27 feet (8.2 m); the average thickness of the walls is 6 feet (1.8 m). Only the walls to the south and east remain; they rise to 50 feet (15 m). Its rounded angles are constructed of dressed ashlar, while the rest of the masonry is of coursed rubble. There are remains of the earthworks, comprising the inner and outer banks of a medial ditch; these are best preserved towards the south west of the structure.

== See also ==
- Castles in Great Britain and Ireland
- List of castles in Scotland
- Scheduled monuments in the Scottish Borders
