= Thirlestane Castle =

Castle in Scottish Borders

Coordinates: 55°43′21″N 2°44′37″W

Designations

Inventory of Gardens and Designed Landscapes in Scotland
- Official name: Thirlestane Castle
- Designated: 1 July 1987
- Reference no.: GDL00371

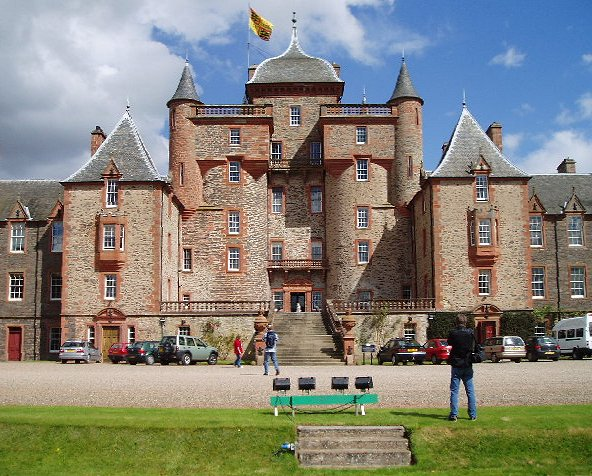
Thirlestane Castle

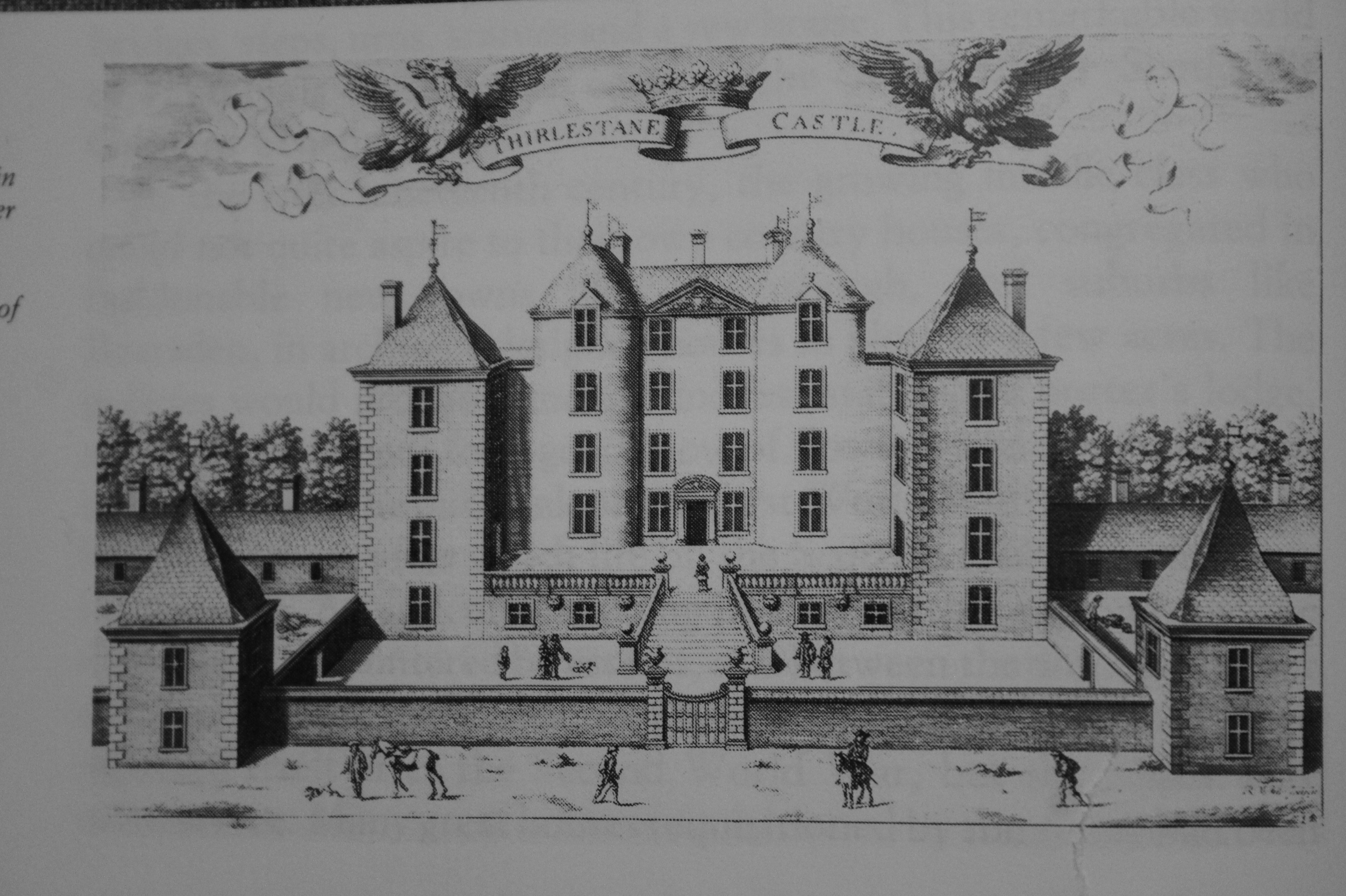
Thirlestane Castle c.1690 by Cpt John Slezer

Thirlestane Castle is a castle set in extensive parklands near Lauder in the Borders of Scotland. The site is aptly named Castle Hill, as it stands upon raised ground. However, the raised land is within Lauderdale, the valley of the Leader Water. The land has been in the ownership of the Maitland family since 1587, and Thirlestane served as the seat of the Earls of Lauderdale. The castle was substantially extended in the 1670s by the first and only Duke of Lauderdale. Further additions were made in the 19th century. The castle is now cared for by a charitable trust, and is open to the public.

== History of the castle ==
Before the 13th century, a large fort or castle was built on Castle Hill near the Leader Water. It was the site of the ancient church of Lauder, where in 1482, James III's favourites, including the architect Robert Cochrane, were dragged by envious nobles led by Archibald Douglas, 5th Earl of Angus and hanged from the (earlier) Lauder Bridge. The sites of the ancient kirk and the bridge from which Cochrane and his colleagues met their demise, are now within the immediate policies of Thirlestane Castle, the church some 60 yards from the west front, and the bridge some quarter-mile to the north-east.

This castle passed to Robert Lauder of that Ilk, who gave it in dowry to his daughter Alison and her husband George Wedderhede in 1532. This couple, and their son, were all murdered in feuds, Alison in 1547. Presumably the lands reverted to her parents, her mother being Alison Cranstoun. They both died in the second half of 1567 leaving only young grandchildren as heirs.

During the war with England known as the 'Rough Wooings' the site of the present castle was occupied by a large English artillery fort and garrison. Following the design by Thomas Pettit, Surveyor of Calais, the fort was begun on 5 April 1548 by Sir Robert Bowes and was estimated to cost £296 and take four weeks to complete. Hugh Willoughby was its captain. The villagers of Lauderdale and further afield were summoned to demolish the fort and help transport the remaining artillery to Hume Castle in June 1550.

The Cranstouns sold Castle Hill on 27 January 1587 to Sir John Maitland (d. 1595). By the 22 March 1587, Maitland was "busily occupied with his masons at the building of his house in the Fort of Lauder."

=== The Maitland family ===
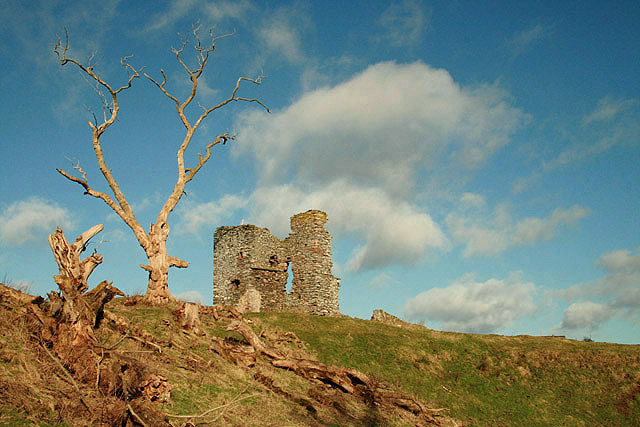
Maitland's original peel tower (Old Thirlestane Castle

The Maitlands came to Britain from Normandy with William the Conqueror in 1066, originally settling in Northumberland. They gained power and influence as a result of military service but largely due to their contributions to law and the arts in the 16th century. William Maitland of Lethington, was Secretary to Mary, Queen of Scots, his younger brother was Sir John Maitland, Secretary of Scotland, who acquired Thirlestane in 1587. In the same year he built a large square keep or tower house upon the foundations and walls of the original fort. In 1590, Sir John was appointed Lord Chancellor of Scotland, and was ennobled as Lord Maitland of Thirlestane. This new house near Lauder was to replace the Maitland's original but now decaying (Old) Thirlestane Castle, a peel tower situated a mile or so to the south-east, the ruins of which are still extant near the hamlet of Thirlestane.

James VI of Scotland visited several times. He came in February 1591 to celebrate the wedding of John Maitland's niece to the Laird of Lugton. He stayed again in October 1593. After John Maitland's death on 3 October 1595, his widow Jean Fleming married the Earl of Cassilis and on 22 February 1599 Fleming and Cassilis hosted James VI at the castle.

Lord Maitland's son John Maitland was created the 1st Earl of Lauderdale in 1624. His son was John Maitland, Duke of Lauderdale (1616–1682), one of the most important Scottish figures of the late 17th century, being appointed Secretary of State for Scotland in 1660, a position carrying unrivalled power and influence. He employed the architect Sir William Bruce to transform the castle into a residence suitable for conducting the affairs of state. Between 1670 and 1676 the substantial alterations included the addition of the two front towers and the grand staircase, in addition to extensive internal modifications creating lavish staterooms with magnificent plasterwork ceilings. Lauderdale had Bruce retain much of the castle's earlier fabric giving it an external aura of antiquity, while the interiors met the highest fashion in seventeenth century planning and furnishing. This allowed Lauderdale to revere the antiquity of his family residence at the same time as living in high contemporary fashion. After the Duke of Lauderdale's death, his widow Elizabeth Maitland, Duchess of Lauderdale, explained in a letter how much he had preferred Thirlestane to Lethington Castle, and thought it better to settle his family there rather than in Lothian. He had even thought of being buried in Lauder Kirk.

By the 19th century, in more peaceful times, the castle took on the role of a Scottish country mansion for the Earls of Lauderdale. In 1840 the Edinburgh architects David Bryce and William Burn were engaged to design extensions to the castle. Their additions consist of two large wings flanking the central keep and a south wing, constructed around a central courtyard, housing new kitchens, pantries, laundries and servants' quarters.

During World War Two the castle was home to St. Hilary's, a girls' school evacuated from Edinburgh. The 15th Earl and Countess of Lauderdale lived in the north wing of the castle, while the school used the rest. The dorms were on the upper floors, while the main rooms were classrooms. The great dining room was used as the school dining room and assembly hall. St. Hilary's remained at Thirlestane until the end of 1944 when they returned to Edinburgh.

== The castle today ==
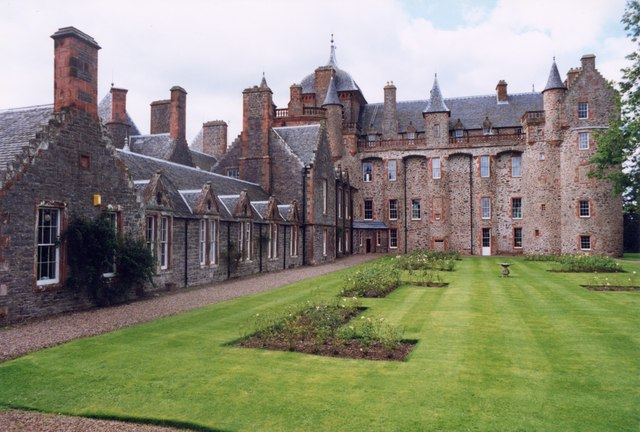
Thirlestane Castle gardens.

Captain Gerald Maitland-Carew inherited the castle in 1972 from his maternal grandmother, Ethel, Countess of Lauderdale, wife of the 15th Earl. At this time, the castle was in a serious state of disrepair, requiring extensive renovation. In 1984 the castle was given to a charitable trust established to ensure its preservation, and major repairs were carried out, assisted by financial grants awarded by the Historic Buildings Council and the National Heritage Memorial Fund.

In addition to the grounds, the castle itself and its interiors, Thirlestane is noted for fine collections of paintings, furniture, porcelain and an historic toy collection.

In June 2021, planning permission was granted to Lauderdale Estates to construct holiday lodges in the castle grounds.

== See also ==
- List of places in the Scottish Borders
