= Whittingehame Tower =

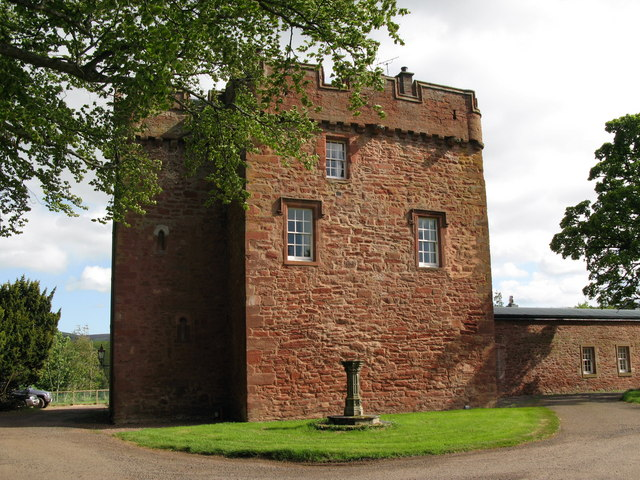
- Interactive map of the Whittingehame Tower area

General information
- Location: East Lothian, East Linton, Scotland
- Coordinates: 55°57′02″N 2°38′18″W

Whittingehame Tower, or Whittingehame Castle, is a fifteenth-century tower house about 2.5 miles (4.0 km) south of East Linton, on the west bank of Whittinghame Water in East Lothian, Scotland.

== History and structure ==
Whittingehame Tower was built on lands belonging to the Cospatrick Earls of March. In the 14th century the lands were acquired by the Douglases. During the reign of Mary, Queen of Scots, they were held by James Douglas, 4th Earl of Morton. The property subsequently passed through the hands of the Setons, Hays and Balfours of Balbirnie, who occupy the castle still. Arthur Balfour, Prime Minister from 1902 to 1905, belonged to this family.

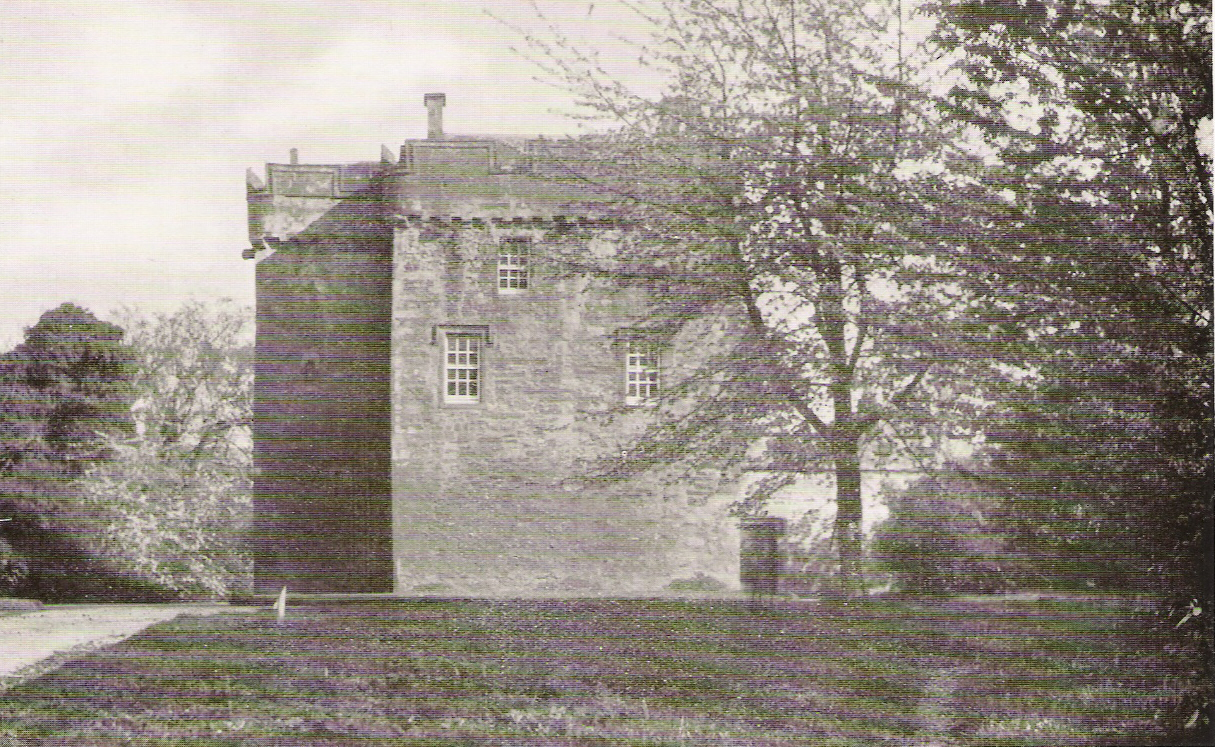
Whittinghame Tower in the 1920s

Whittingehame Tower is an altered L-plan keep, comprising a rectangular main block and small stair-wing. It has a parapet which is corbelled out, with rounded corners. There is a cap-house, which was used as a dovecote in the 1930s. There is a vaulted basement. The hall, on the first floor, is panelled; its ceiling is finely plastered. The entrance is by the stair-wing. Some of the windows have been enlarged. The hall now houses a collection of documents and old prints. The tower is a category A listed building, the highest level of protection for a historic building in Scotland.

Until the early 20th-century there was a raised terrace close to the tower reached by steps, overlooking the famous Whittinghame yew tree. This was probably a garden feature built by James Douglas, 4th Earl of Morton who is known to have constructed gardens at Aberdour Castle and Lochleven Castle or one of his successors. The platform has sometimes been interpreted as a defensive feature for deploying artillery.

== Morton at Whittinghame ==
According to Regent Morton's "Confession", in January 1567 Morton, the Earl of Bothwell, the future husband of Mary, Queen of Scots, and William Maitland of Lethington, the queen's secretary, were entertained at Whittinghame by the owner, Archibald Douglas. Maitland was the laird of Whittingehame's brother-in-law.

It is said that they conferred together in the shelter of a yew tree in the grounds to plot the murder of Henry Stewart, Lord Darnley, Queen Mary's unpopular and increasingly estranged husband. Morton, just returned from exile in England after the murder of David Rizzio, was unenthusiastic, and requested the queen's direct guidance. Despite the queen's reluctance to give the matter her sanction, the plot put together at Whittingehame was put into effect in due course.

Mary's half-brother, the Earl of Moray, was received at Whittingehame by Morton and Lethington about 18 months later, and they concurred with his expression of horror at the murder of Darnley. Bothwell was by then an outlaw. Moray certainly stayed at Whittingehame on 12 August 1567.

== Gum tree ==
The first cider gum (Eucalyptus gunnii) in Great Britain is said to have been planted in the grounds of the castle in 1853, and to have survived for over one hundred years.
