= William Maitland of Lethington =

Scottish politician (1525–1573)

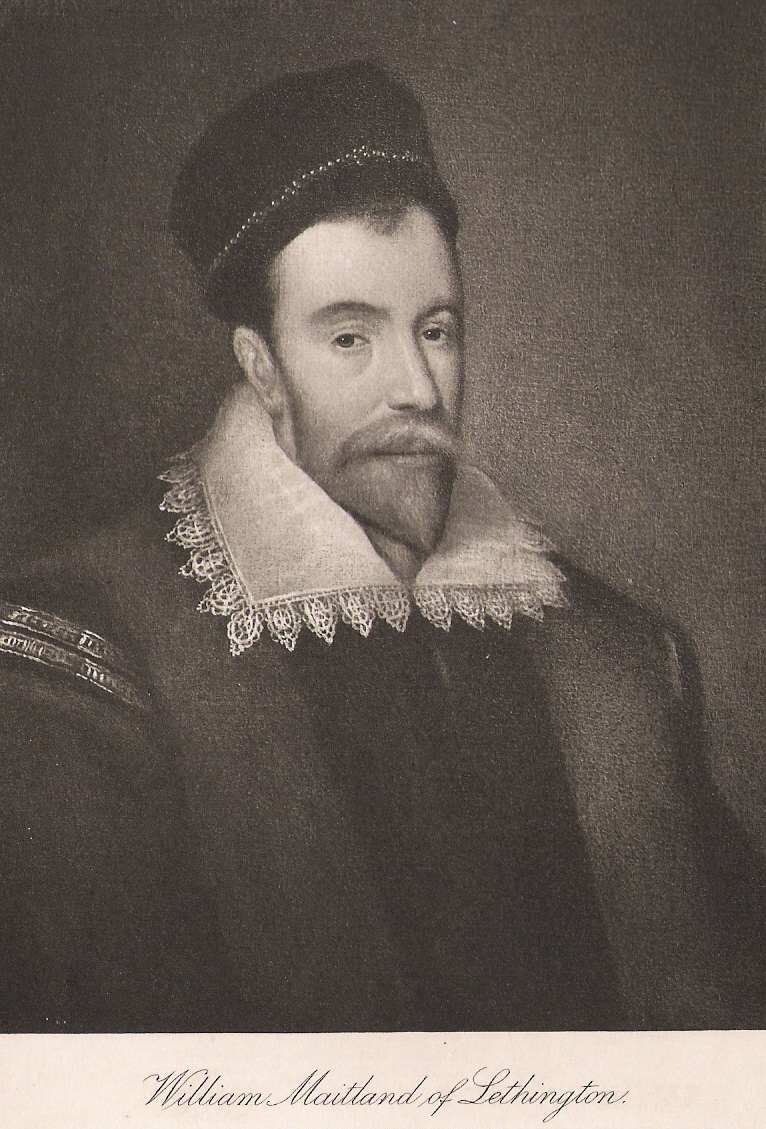
William Maitland of Lethington

William Maitland of Lethington (1525 – 9 June 1573) was a Scottish politician and reformer, and the eldest son of poet Richard Maitland.

== Life ==
He was educated at the University of St Andrews.

William was the renowned "Secretary Lethington" to Mary, Queen of Scots. As her Secretary of State from 1558, he played a prominent part in the various movements of his time, but did not gain the confidence of any party. He adhered to the party of James Stewart, 1st Earl of Moray, illegitimate half-brother of the Queen, against the extreme measures of John Knox, and generally held his own against the preachers. His knowledge of foreign, and especially of English, politics and his general ability were assets of the highest value.

The lords sent Maitland to England to ask for assistance from Elizabeth, and his constant aim throughout his political career was to bring about a union between the two crowns. He was the guest of Ralph Sadler at Sutton House. He proved a highly astute ambassador at Elizabeth's court. He was involved in the conspiracy to murder David Rizzio (the private secretary and rumoured lover of Queen Mary) by her king consort Henry Stuart, Lord Darnley and his supporters, and was obliged to leave the court, but he managed to regain the Queen's favour. After Mary was captured by her enemies at the battle of Carberry Hill, on 25 July 1567 Maitland came to see the English ambassador in Edinburgh, Nicholas Throckmorton. As instructed by Elizabeth, Throckmorton asked Maitland if the plan was to restore Mary to the throne. If so, Elizabeth promised to help prosecute Darnley's murder and preserve Prince James. Throckmorton recorded Maitland's personal answer, which outlined that English interference was not welcome at this time and might even be counterproductive, and that Throckmorton would not be allowed to see Mary:

Being in place to knowe more than you can knowe, I saye unto yowe ..., in case you doe on the Quenes majesties behalf your mestris, presse this company to enlarge the Quene my soveraigne, and to suffer you to goe unto her (at Lochleven Castle), or doe use any thretnynge speache in those matters, the rather to compasse them (rather than achieve them), I assure you, you wyll put the Quene my soveraigne in greate jeopardye of her lyffe: and therefore there is none other waye for the present to do her good but to give place and use mildness.

When Mary fled to the Kingdom of England in 1568 Maitland joined with the new government, but acted in her interest and formed a party to restore her to power. He was one of the Scots who met Elizabeth's representatives at York in 1568; here he showed a desire to exculpate Mary and to marry her to the duke of Norfolk, a course of action probably dictated by a desire to avoid all revelations about the Darnley murder. Maitland followed Regent Moray in his march against Mary's supporters and wrote to John Wood from Hoddom on 22 June 1568.

He was arrested in 1569 for his part in the crime. During the Marian Civil War, Maitland was one of the targets of the satire The Dialogue of the Twa Wyfeis, written in support of the King's party, and George Buchanan's Chameleon alluded to a capacity to change his colours. In 1573 Sir William Kirkcaldy of Grange, noted for his military talents and the forthright adherent of Mary, Queen of Scots, arranged for Maitland to be moved to Edinburgh Castle, and held the castle for Mary's party, along with his brother, Sir James, as a result of which Maitland's trial was postponed.

The Regent called on the military assistance of Queen Elizabeth I of England, who dispatched Sir William Drury from Berwick-upon-Tweed with a formidable train of artillery to assist in reducing the castle. Kirkcaldy resisted with firmness worthy of his high military reputation, until the walls were breached and shattered, his provisions expended, the wells choked with ruins and inaccessible, and the artillery silenced. He surrendered to Sir William Drury in May 1573 on a general promise of favourable terms; but in this, the English commander had undertaken more than he could make good.

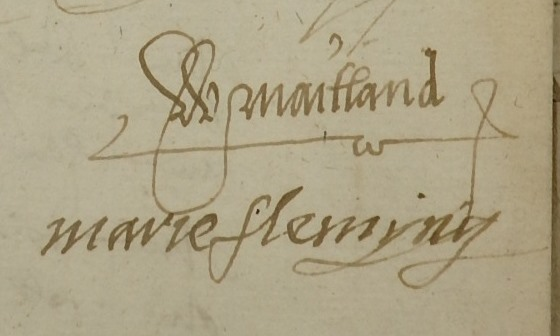
Signatures of Mary Fleming and William Maitland, National Records of Scotland

By Elizabeth's orders, Sir William Drury saw himself obliged to surrender his prisoners to Regent Morton, and the gallant Kirkcaldy and his brother were executed at the Market Cross in Edinburgh. Maitland of Lethington, already ill, was moved to a cell in the newly completed Leith Tolbooth, for his own protection, where the following month he either died "in the Roman fashion" by taking his own life, through poison on 9 July 1573, rather than face the humiliation of public execution. His body apparently lay unmoved for a considerable time, and was partially consumed by rats.

== Family ==
On 6 January 1567, Maitland married the much younger Mary Fleming, one of the "Four Marys" who accompanied Mary, Queen of Scots, to France in 1548 as her principal attendants. Jamie Reid-Baxter has suggested that the Scots Renaissance comedy Philotus, about a lecherous octogenarian seeking marriage to a teenage girl, may first have been performed during the Maitland-Fleming wedding celebrations in Stirling.

Their son, James Maitland of Lethington (born 1568), wrote a history of the early years of Mary, Queen of Scots. William Maitland's daughter, Margaret, married Robert Ker, 1st Earl of Roxburghe.

William Maitland was the brother of John Maitland, 1st Lord Maitland of Thirlestane, Lord Chancellor of Scotland, and Marie Maitland, considered a scribe of the Maitland Folio and Quarto.

== Sources ==
- Burke, Messrs., John and John Bernard, The Extinct & Dormant Baronetcies of England, Ireland, and Scotland, 2nd edition, London, 1841, p. 629.
- Cant, R.G., The University of St Andrews: A Short History, Scottish Academic Press, 1970
- Russell, E., Maitland of Lethington, London, 1912.
- Scot, Sir John, of Scotstarvet, Director of Chancery, The Staggering State of the Scots Statesmen, from 1550 to 1650, Edinburgh, 1754, pps: 54 – 57.
