= George Wishart of Drymme =

Scottish landowner, lawyer and financial administrator

George Wishart of Drymme was a Scottish landowner, lawyer, and a financial administrator for Mary, Queen of Scots.

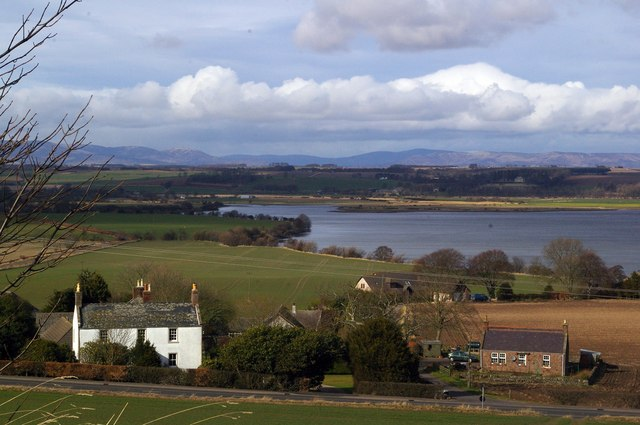
View across the Montrose Basin from Maryton to the lands formerly called "Drymme"

== Family background ==
George Wishart was a kinsman of John Wishart of Pitarrow. His lands may have been at "Drynne", "Drymmie" or Drymme, also known as "Drum", in Maryton parish near Montrose in Angus, Scotland.

=== Sub-collector of the Thirds of Benefices ===
In March 1562 John Wishart of Pitarrow became the comptroller of the exchequer and "collector-general of teinds", the collector of the tax for church incomes calculated on the value of farms and incomes. John Wishart gave his kinsman George Wishart a job as a sub-collector of these royal incomes. An account made by George Wishart of the crown income (charge) and the expenditure (discharge) in 1564/5 is held by the National Records of Scotland, and has been published as a historical source by the Scottish History Society. From the teinds, the "thirds of benefices" contributed to the expenses of the household of Mary, Queen of Scots.

Another member of the family, John Wishart's older brother, Alexander Wishart of Cairnbeg in Fordoun, was involved as collector of the thirds of Coupar Angus Abbey, and chamberlain of Badenoch. George Wishart collected a few payments from his regional neighbours, including Walter Wood of Balbegno north of Brechin for lands at Fettercairn, and from Ninian Guthrie of Kingennie near Dundee, as Sheriff of Angus.

Similar material in Wishart's account, especially regarding payments for the Royal Guard (and their travelling mattresses), Captain Anstruther, and the fortress island of Inchkeith, appears in other manuscript accounts. Wishart also accounted some money that was "neither of the property nor yet of the collectory", including payments from William Fowler (father of the poet William Fowler), who was a treasurer of Mary's French revenues.

The historian Gordon Donaldson highlighted payments by Wishart to household officers, including David Rizzio, who appears as "David Rischo, Italiane", and payments to the Kirk minister John Knox, as part of his stipend and also sums of money given to two of his servants, Margaret Fowlis and John Reid. Another payment for Knox was given to Robert Watson, a merchant in Edinburgh. The musician and valet of the queen's chamber James Lauder was paid £125 Scots towards his pension and fee.

John Wishart of Pitarrow supported the Earl of Moray during the Chaseabout Raid and lost his job. No more is heard of George Wishart at the exchequer. The date of his death is unknown.

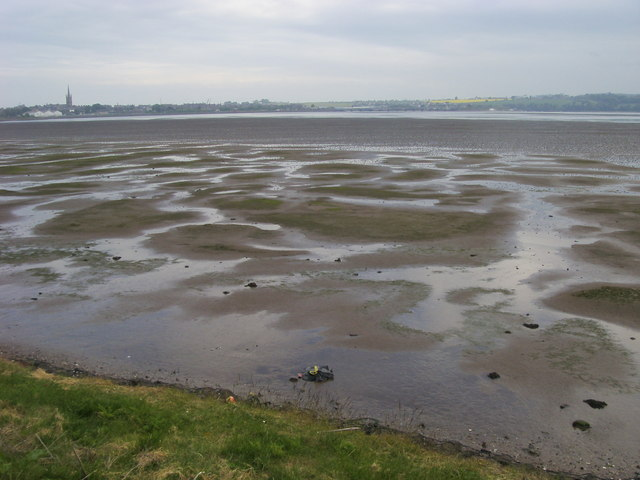
View towards Montrose from Dun

== Marriage and children ==
Something is known of George Wishart's family. He married Elizabeth Guthrie (d. 1583), the widow of James Mylne of Dundee. She was a grandmother of a more well-known Dundee merchant David Wedderburn. Their daughter Eufame Wishart married Archibald Campbell of Clavers. Elizabeth Guthrie left a will which mentions the farmstock at Drymme with the plough oxen, work horses, and the sheep they grazed beside the Montrose Basin.

His son, also George Wishart, succeeded him as Laird of Drynnie or Drymme, before June 1605. He married Elizabeth Erskine, a daughter of Robert Erskine (d. 1590) from the nearby House of Dun, and a granddaughter of the Reformer, John Erskine of Dun. In 1609 George Wishart of Drymme and his son George, the feuar of Drymme, owed 2000 merks to a London-based tailor, Andrew Balfour.
