= William MacDowall =

British architect

William MacDowall or McDougall (died 1580) was a Scottish priest and Master of Works to Mary, Queen of Scots, her mother Mary of Guise, and James VI of Scotland. MacDowall worked with gardeners to improve the grounds of Holyrood Palace. The title 'sir' was used in Scotland by a priest without a master's degree. The name appears variously as McDowgall, McDougall, McDowall etc., in printed records, he signed accounts MAKDOUELL.

== Career ==
William MacDowall was first employed by John Scrimgeour of Myres in 1535, managing the stone quarry during construction work at Holyroodhouse. During the war known as the "Rough Wooing", he was involved in the fabrication of arms at Edinburgh Castle. Later, MacDowall worked on the building of fortifications against the English for Mary of Guise, during her regency (1554–1556), and collecting taxes to fund these defensive works.

In 1558, MacDowall worked on repairs to the forewall of Edinburgh Castle and the parapet of David's Tower, and the Palace of Holyroodhouse. From August to October 1558 he was busy directing works on the Island of Inchkeith, including the construction of a munition house, to complete an artillery fortress designed by the Italian military engineer and architect Lorenzo Pomarelli. When royal artillery was stationed at Hume Castle in 1558, MacDowall collected 60 Swedish pine boards to make rafts or boats to carry materials on the Tweed.

In 1550, he was chaplain to the Deacon of Guild, and as reward for his labours on the common buildings of the town, his relation John MacDowall was made a member of the guild without charge. As master of work for Edinburgh burgh council, MacDowall measured quantities and made contracts with masons, including works at Newhaven. For St. Giles he procured timber for roofing the Consistory in 1555 and wainscot in 1557 for the seating of Our Lady's Aisle. In 1557, he made a contract with building lime producers in Cousland to supply lime for Edinburgh's town walls.

In November 1554, Mary of Guise appointed him chaplain of the altar of Saint Michael in the chapel in Holyrood Palace. After the death of Mary of Guise he remained in Edinburgh Castle and was charged with neglecting his duties as a warden and Master of St. Pauls Work. He was allowed the use of a little house in St Paul's Work. After the reformation of 1560, MacDowall was excluded from the town works, which recommenced with the conversion of a part of St Giles Kirk into a new Tollbooth.

=== Reign of Mary, Queen of Scots ===
Although MacDowall was not again employed by the town, he worked for Mary, Queen of Scots, and repaired a pair of organs at Holroodhouse. He visited the island of Inchkeith with Captain Robert Anstruther on 12 September 1561 to direct repairs to the fortress. In November 1561, with David Rowan, an expert gunner from Edinburgh castle, he surveyed the fortifications at Dunbar Castle.

In 1563, MacDowall received a fee payment of £66 with William Lawson, who was a custodian of Holyrood Palace and keeper of the Queen's coals. MacDowall was paid for works to refurbish the gardens of Holyroodhouse in September 1564. An acouunt for the work (which does not survive) was signed by an Italian courtier Francisco de Busso. At that time William Brown was the gardener of the south palace garden, and John Morrison keeper of the north garden. William Brown repaired a pond and renewed hedges and boundary dykes at Holyrood with MacDowall.

MacDowall was working at Stirling Castle in October 1566, on an archery range at Holyroodhouse in February 1567, and other projects at Linlithgow Palace and Edinburgh Castle. Works continued in Edinburgh from August 1567 to February 1568, and with repairs at Blackness Castle to December. As master of work he surveyed the work of craftsmen appointed by the crown to look after the palaces; such as William Robertson, the slater, and Steven Loch, glass-wright, both appointed by Mary, Queen of Scots 28 April 1562.

=== Reign of James VI ===
In September 1570 he began work at Stirling Castle, and the Edinburgh mint at Holyrood, and the stables there in March 1573. In April 1574 he began supervising the construction of the iconic half moon battery at Edinburgh Castle. His yearly salary was by now £150 Scots. As master of work for Regent Morton, he worked on the inner gate of Edinburgh Castle in 1577, built a gallery at Stirling Castle, and another gallery at Holyroodhouse, which was painted by Walter Binning. Building timber for Stirling Castle was shipped from Leith in July 1578.

In October 1579 he completed works in preparation for the ceremonial entry of James VI into Edinburgh. In November he prepared a sand arena or tournament course for "running at the ring" at Holyroodhouse for the young king. By this time, his successor Robert Drummond of Carnock had already been appointed. At the end of December 1579, MacDowall delivered the foundation deeds of St. Paul's hospital to the burgh council. He died soon after. On 10 February 1580, burgh officials distributed money amongst the poor of St. Paul's Hospital from a box found in his possession, and the town council appointed his successor at St. Paul's Hospital on 3 June 1580.

== Church appointments ==
The historian Gordon Donaldson noted MacDowall as an example of a pluralist since in addition to wages and fees for his royal building work, as a priest MacDowall not only gained by royal patronage the incomes from several altars and churches but also exemption from paying dues back to the crown. MacDowall gained the vicarage of the parish of Leswalt in Whithorn diocese on 1 January 1559. After William's death, in March 1580, his vicarages of Leswalt and Inch, were given to Richard Waus, a natural son of Patrick Vans of Barnbarroch. Drummany (Dalmeny) was given to its Minister, George Lundy, after James, son of James Stewart of Craigiehall, was found inadequate to be appointed Reader.

== Bannatyne's Memoriall Buik ==
George Bannatyne (1545–1608), an Edinburgh merchant who made a collection of Scottish poetry, compiled a family "Memoriall Buik" in which he recorded the names of the godparents of his siblings. The list includes William (1557), and another priest sir Robert Danielstoun or Denniston, Parson of Dysart (1551) whose brother served as a master of work, and keeper of Linlithgow Palace.

Preceded by John Scrimgeour of Myres	Master of Work to the Crown of Scotland; 1555–1579	Succeeded by Robert Drummond of Carnock
