= John Scrimgeour of Myres =

John Scrimgeour of Myres Castle near Falkland, Fife was Master of Work for royal buildings for James V and Mary, Queen of Scots, and Precentor of the Scottish Chapel Royal.

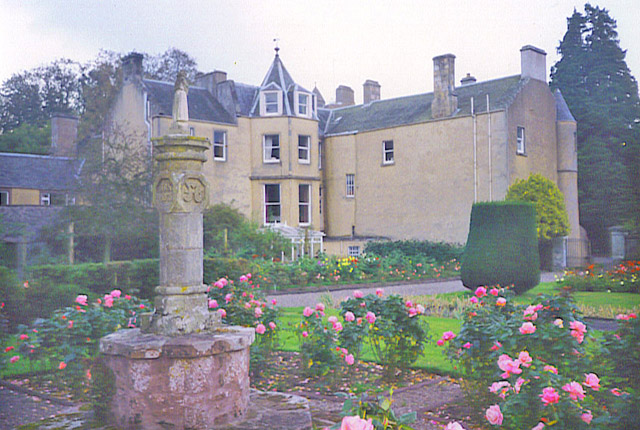
Myres Castle is near to Falkland Palace

== Career ==
He and his father held their lands by right of an hereditary office as sergeant-of-arms or macer to the King of Scotland. John Scrimgeour kept the building accounts for most of the works of James V from 1529, especially for Falkland Palace and Holyroodhouse, and most of these accounts survive. As well as supervising building work and contracts, Scrimgeour was also involved in collecting taxes, mostly from church lands, which James V had allocated to the works.

From a tax on church lands granted to James V for his expenses in France, from October 1536 to September 1538, Scrimgeour received £4996-7s-10d Scots.

Scrimgeour was briefly eclipsed between 1538 and 1540 when Sir James Hamilton of Finnart was appointed Principal Master of Work with higher authority, and again in the first years of the regency of James Hamilton, 2nd Earl of Arran who employed a kinsman, John Hamilton of Milnburn. During the war of the Rough Wooing, in October 1545 Scrimgeour became the treasurer of a force of 1000 border horseman, administering a tax of £18,000 raised for their wages. He was to spend three months in the Merse and Teviotdale attending the musters of this defence force.

A case was brought against Scrimgeour in the Stewartry Court of Fife, held in Falkland Palace on 9 February 1548, when William Bonair of Rossy disputed his rights to the lands of Glasstullo.

In September 1553 he spent £2333-6s-8d on Arran's building works. Subsequently he was employed by Mary of Guise and her daughter, Mary, Queen of Scots. He seems to have died in the year 1563. He was succeeded by sir William MacDowall, who had long been a clerk in the works.

== Manuscript ==
The National Library of Scotland has a volume of heraldic writings which belonged to John Scrimgeour, including a bestiary. The text of The Deidis of Armorie also includes advice for heraldic officers, including the Captains of castles and towns, who were instructed to keep certain and sure watch both day and night for fear of the return of plague.

== Marriage ==
Scrimgeour was married to Helen Little or Littil. Their children included a son, William.

Scrimgeour and Littil owned a tenement in Edinburgh from which they paid an annualrent to the altar of St Laurence in St Giles' Kirk.

== Works ==
Scrimgeour supervised the construction of timber 'lists', barriers, and a stand for a tournament at St Andrews in May and June 1538. This was in preparation for the formal reception of Mary of Guise, the second wife of James V. A series of building accounts for the Royal Palaces of James V written by Scrimgeour for audit purposes between 1529 and 1541 survive in the National Archives of Scotland. These were published in full in 1957, and record projects at Holyroodhouse, Stirling Castle, Edinburgh Castle, Falkland Palace, Linlithgow Palace, and other lesser works.

A letter from John Scrimgeour to Mary of Guise of uncertain date reveals that she took an interest in the details of building works. She had asked him to inspect her lodging in Edinburgh (perhaps at Castlehill at the top of the Royal Mile) with glaziers and slaters. The building was found to require attention. Scrimgeour hired a slater to fix the roof, a glazier, and other craftsmen. He had also sent lead to Falkland Palace to mend the roof, after the winter frosts had passed. He intended to inspect Falkland Palace and spent 8 days there. He asked her to issue a proclamation ordering carters to carry stones and bring timber from Leven or Levenmouth. His son would remain in Edinburgh and supervise work on her lodging.

Preceded by James Hamilton of Finnart	Master of Work to the Crown of Scotland; 1529–1563	Succeeded by (1) William MacDowall (2) Robert Drummond of Carnock
