= Teind =

Type of a medieval donation in Scotland

In Scotland a teind (Scottish Gaelic: deachamh) was a tithe derived from the produce of the land for the maintenance of the clergy.

It is also an old lowland term for a tribute due to be paid by the fairies to the devil every seven years. Found in the story of Tam Lin as well as in the ballad of Thomas the Rhymer.

Teind is a Scots word for tithe, meaning a tenth part.

== Scottish Reformation and the Thirds of Benefices ==
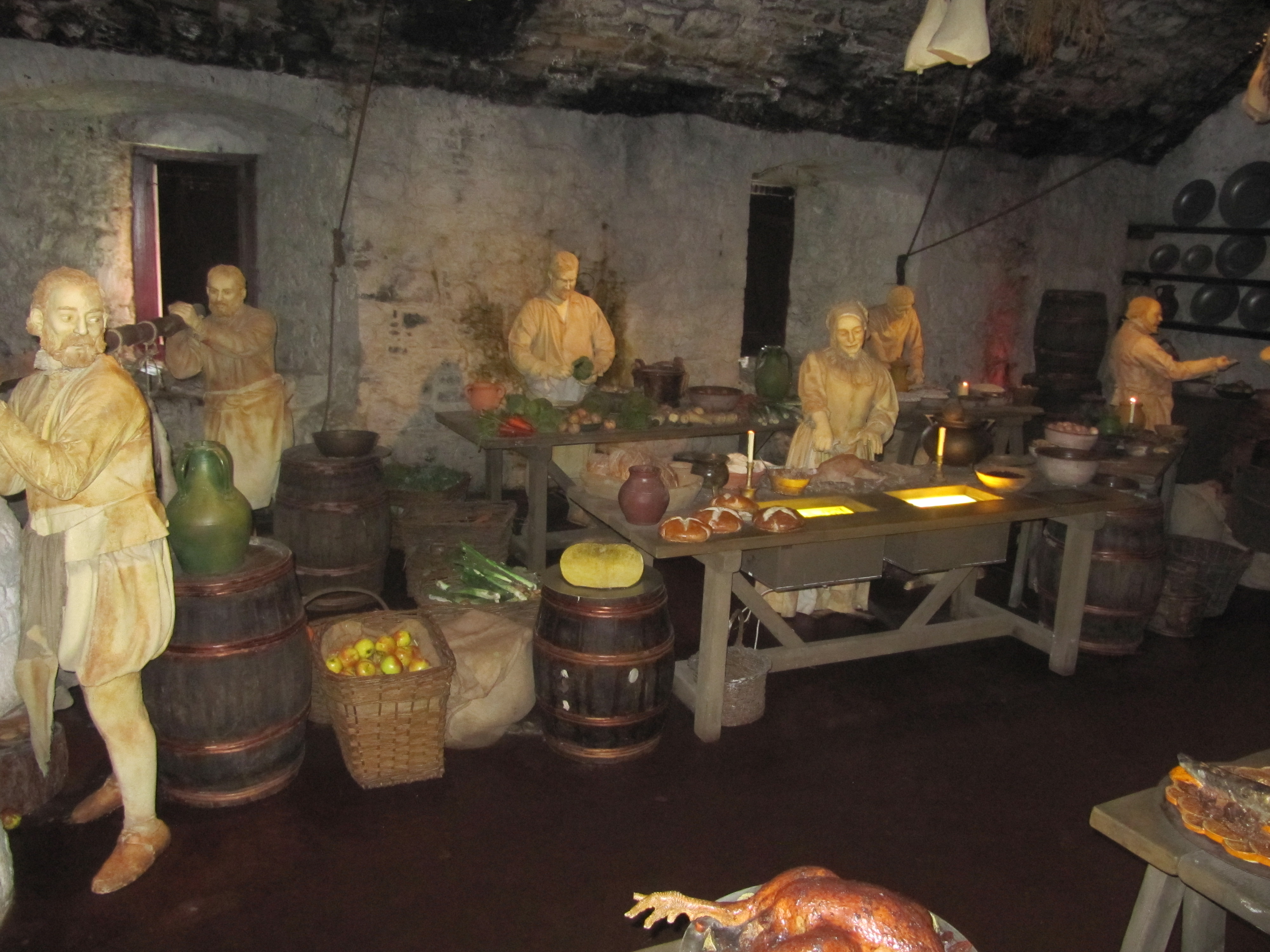
The royal kitchen display at Stirling Castle

Teinds had been used to support the living expenses of clergy. The tenth part of the produce of a parish was set aside for the provision of church services, although the revenue was in many places appropriated to a religious instutution or a major benefice.

On 15 February 1562 the Privy Council of Scotland regulated the collection of a third of the teinds for the stipends of ministers of the reformed church and the expenses of the royal household. A survey was made of rentals and revenues received by clergy. The resulting "Books of Assumption" is a record of the wealth of the church of Scotland at the Reformation and reveals the names of many secular or laymen owners who then owned former ecclesiastic properties. The detailed record also reveals the variety of agricultural produce, fishing, and coal or lime produced on the lands.

On 1 March 1562 John Wishart of Pitarrow was appointed comptroller and collector-general of teinds. A "Collectory" was established to manage the Thirds of Benefices. In this capacity, Wishart became paymaster of the reformed clergy, many of whom resented the scantiness of their stipends. According to John Knox, the saying was current, "The good laird of Pittarro was ane earnest professour of Christ; but the mekle Devill receave the comptrollar". Wishart appointed a kinsman George Wishart of Drymme as a sub-collector of Thirds of Benefices from Forfar and Kincardine, and his account includes payments made by Mary, Queen of Scots, to Knox and his servants, and to David Rizzio.

Extracts from the accounts of the Thirds of Benefices, the records of Collectory between 1561 and 1572 were published by Gordon Donaldson. Much of the money or produce collected went towards the expenses of the royal household and guard. In 1563, John Knox complained that "the gaird and the effairis of the kytcheing wer so gryping that the mynisteris stipendis could nocht be payit". The accounts record wine, beef and mutton, and cheese bought for the royal household. Coal from Wallyford in East Lothian was sent to the Palace of Holyroodhouse for Mary, Queen of Scots, and some was shipped to Aberdeen when she visited.

== Collectors of the Thirds ==
- 1562: John Wishart of Pitarrow, (also Comptroller of Scotland).
- 1565: William Murray of Tullibardine.
- Adam Erskine of Cambuskenneth.
- 1574: Robert Boyd, 5th Lord Boyd.

== See also ==
- Court of Teinds
- Queen of the Fairies
- Elphame
