= Guard and archers of Mary, Queen of Scots =

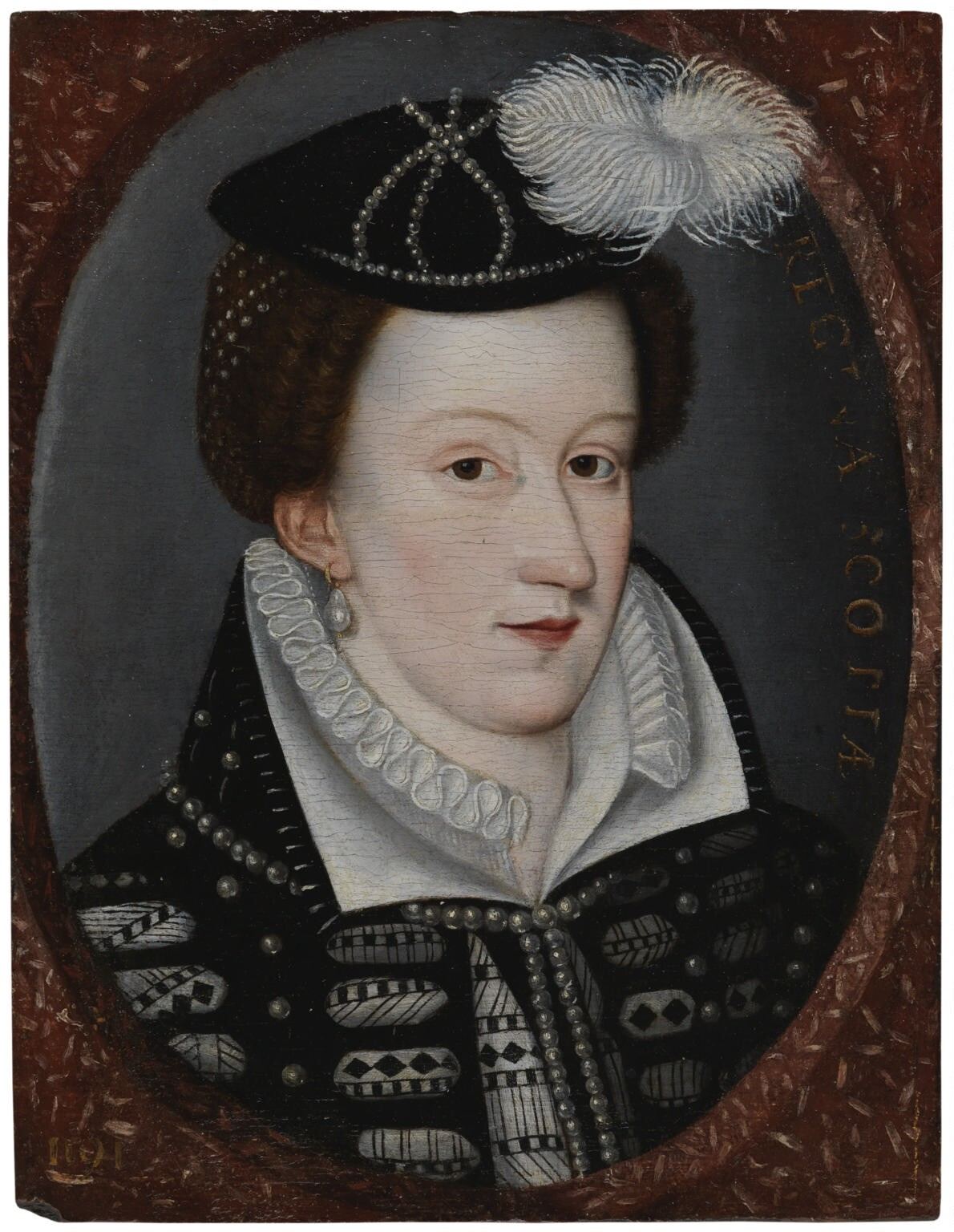
Mary, Queen of Scots, formed a guard of archers for her personal safety.

Mary, Queen of Scots established a royal guard with archers in 1562. This force travelled with her during her progresses in Scotland. The personnel were Scottish and French.

== Formation ==
James Savoy, a French trumpeter, and other soldiers were given wages for service before the "listing of the guard" in 1562. Savoy's equipment included a red taffeta banderole. Savoy was a military trumpeter and shawmer in Scottish royal service since January 1549.

The number of the guard was "complete and erect" on 1 April 1562. The wages of the whole contingent would amount to £9,000 Scots yearly.

George Buchanan claimed the guard was a force of foreign mercenaries, though French soldiers were in a minority. Lord Herries, in his Historical Memoirs, claims that Mary's brother Lord James publicly objected to the guard as a forerunner of tyranny. Buchanan asserts that David Rizzio was wary of the loyalty of the Scottish guards to the Scottish nobility and tried to have more foreign "soldiers of fortune" employed, such as Germans or Italians. A number of Frenchmen can be identified in the records.

The guard was funded in part from the Thirds of Benefices, money which might otherwise have funded church ministers. John Knox complained that in 1563 "the gaird and the effairis of the kytcheing wer so gryping that the mynisteris stipendis could nocht be payit". Some funds were received from William Fowler (father of the poet William Fowler), who was a treasurer of the Queen's French revenue.

Buchanan and Knox both suggest that Mary's motivation for establishing a guard include an incident in November 1561 while at Holyrood Palace, when she became frightened "as if horsemen had been in the close, and the Palace been enclosed about". Knox thought her fears of kidnap this occasion may have been caused by "hir awin womanlie fantasye" or a rumour spread by courtiers. Buchanan proposed the fictive incident or rumour was concocted by Mary with John Stewart, Commendator of Coldingham in order to forward the establishment of a palace guard.

In Buchanan's version, the rumour was that James Hamilton, 3rd Earl of Arran planned to abduct Mary and take her to his castle (Kinneil House), fourteen miles from Edinburgh. Arran had fought for the Scottish Reformation, and when Mary arrived in Scotland he commanded a guard of men at arms for Edinburgh burgh council.

== Personnel ==
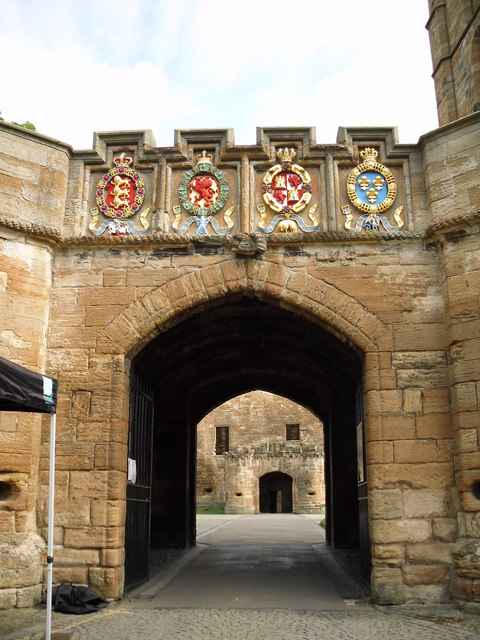
Andrew Ferrier, an archer of guard, was appointed keeper of Linlithgow Palace

James Stewart of Cardonald was the overall captain and commander of the guard, supported by a lieutenant Alexander Stewart and an ensign Robert Stewart. Alan Stewart was "fourrier" or quartermaster of the guard, and Aulay McAulay was clerk of the watch. Robert Anstruther was captain of the garrison on the island of Inchkeith. Andrew Ferrier, a French archer based at Linlithgow, became keeper of Linlithgow Palace.

The names of 75 guards and archers were recorded in the accounts of the Thirds of Benefices. Several received rewards as grants made under the privy seal. Captain Jean Belloc alias Delamis, a French archer, appears in the records of the Canongate Kirk Session, for having a child with Jonet Leddell (who claimed they were to be married) and baptising the child by Catholic ceremony in the chapel of Holyroodhouse. Charles La Brosse was a witness or "gossip" at the christening, and was both an archer and an embroiderer to the Queen. Jonet Leddell said she "held house" with Belloc, suggesting he did not live in a barrack within the palace.

The guard was entrusted with keeping James Hamilton, 3rd Earl of Arran at Edinburgh Castle in 1562. In that year, Mary made a progress to the north. Captain Huw Lauder, promoted from Corporal, was paid £400 Scots in October to raise a company of 100 musketeers or "hagbutters". The accounts mention the straw-filled canvas palliasses used by the soldiers. Five palliases were made by Pierre Martin from the poor quality canvas used to wrap Mary's furnishings for transport.

Nine archers who formed her guard at Aberdeen were paid £100 Scots. A servant messenger was paid £10 for bringing £1000 to Aberdeen for the quarterly payment to the guard. At Inverness, Mary made her famous remark about the life of a soldier, according to Thomas Randolph, she repented nothing but "that she was not a man to lie all night in the fields, or to walk on the causeway, with a jack and knapscall [helmet], a Glasgow buckler, and broad sword". These were presumably arms carried by her foot soldiers and guards.

Royal guards led by a son of Captain James Stewart in an attempt to blockade or besiege Findlater Castle were ambushed in the night and had to surrender their weapons to John Gordon alias Ogilvie.

Soon after this event, and before the battle of Corrichie, the royal accounts mention the movement of a sum of money to Aberdeen, £1,213 Scots destined for paying the guard and defraying the Queen's expenses:

for thre men and ane boy and ane horse expenssis for careing and convoying owt of Murray to Abirdene in the troublous tyme immediatlie befoir the feild of Correchie, quhilk [which] wes bestowit on the garde and in our soverane ladeis house.

According to some accounts of the battle, the Earl of Huntly was captured at Corrichie by Andro Rippeth, a member of the Queen's guard. The Earl died shortly afterwards.

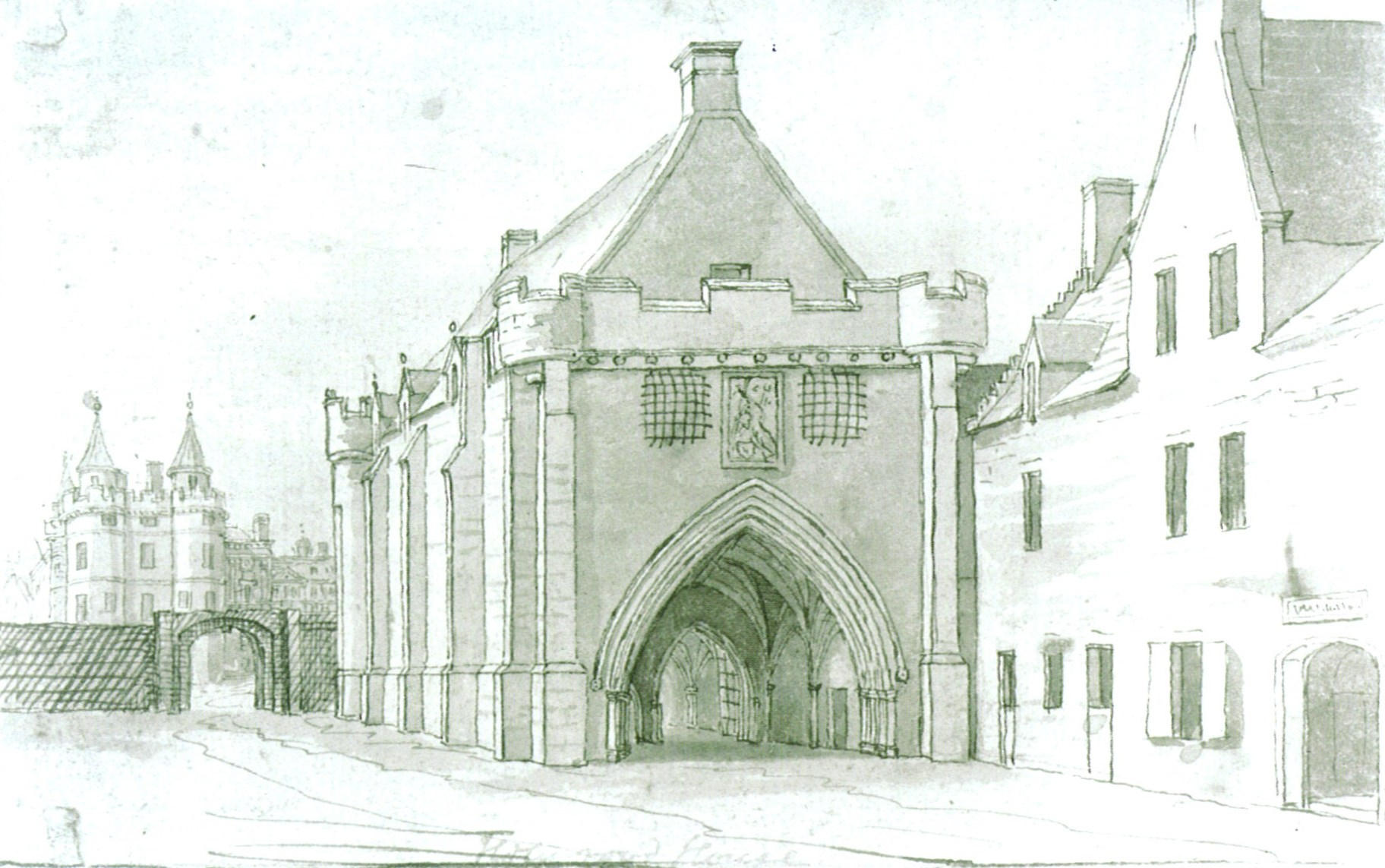
The archers and guard were intended to maintain security at Holyrood Palace

The quartermaster Allan Stewart was given £2,250 Scots for pay in the first quarter of 1564. Part payments for the quarter of April, May, and June 1564 were made to the archers Andrew Ferrier in Linlithgow, Robert Douglas, Charles de la Bros, Captain Gibson, and Bellok. Mary made another progress in 1564, and Allan Stewart was paid for their "removals" and palliasses "during the tyme of the quenis grace passing fra Edinburgh to Atholl to the huntis to Inverness and throuch the north cuntrie and to hir grace cumming agane to Edinburgh".

In January 1565, several members of the Hume family fought with the guard on Edinburgh's High Street, injuring James Stewart of Cardonald. The privy council ordered Jasper, Patrick, and Alexander Hume to enter themselves in ward in Stirling Castle.

Mary now had a detachment of foot soldiers. Alexander Stewart was one of Mary's "four captains of war", the other captains of the footmen were James Cullen, Robert Lauder, and Hew or Hugh Lauder. Hugh Lauder had been promoted from Corporal. According to the English diplomat Thomas Randolph, Robert Lauder of the guard had raised 300 men in July 1565. Randolph wrote that Robert Lauder had struck a kirk minister (Robert Pont), and Hew Lauder had killed a man at Dunbar. Darnley was in charge of the musters. Captain James Stewart had a quarrel with a servant of the Earl of Moray named Grant, and it was said their feud might be an occasion to harm Moray at Perth.

During the Chaseabout Raid, the straw palliasses or mattresses were changed every time Mary and Lord Darnley changed camp or every fifteen days. Mary wrote to her supporters, including Robert Murray of Abercairny, to send as many fighting men as possible, with rations for 20 days, and "palzeonis to ly on the fieldis". The "palzeonis" were tents, and the exchequer rolls include a payment for tents taken to Nithsdale and Annandale during the Chaseabout Raid. Edinburgh burgh council paid £1,000 Scots to Captain Robert Lauder for the wages of his "men of weir" for August 1565. In return Edinburgh did not have to raise a force against the rebels, but was ordered to have a strong night watch.

John Gibson of the guard obtained a licence for lead mining. Robert Stewart, an archer, was imprisoned or threatened with detention at Threave Castle in March 1566 for profiting from piracy.

=== Murder of David Rizzio ===
The role of the guard at Holyroodhouse when David Rizzio was murdered on 9 March 1566 is unclear and most contemporary reports and letters do not mention them. They were either overwhelmed, or surrendered at the command of John Stewart of Traquair who was said to be complicit with the rebels. According to Lord Herries's Historie of the reigne of Marie Queen of Scots, the Laird of Traquair was not present, being "privy to the design", and the guard was also "out of the way". However, Traquair is also said to have accompanied Arthur Erskine of Blackgrange during Mary's ride to Dunbar Castle as captain of the Guard. Mary wrote that while the rebel lords held the palace, her "familiar servitors and guard" were debarred from her service.

== The footmen ==
On 27 March 1566, Thomas Randolph and the Earl of Bedford wrote an account of Rizzio's death mentioning that "besides her Guard, she hath 300 soldiers in wages which are paid by the Town", a burden on the town of Edinburgh. Thomas Merrilees provided Captain Stewart with a quantity of "lint" on 29 November 1566 either to be matches for guns for the footmen or in connection with fireworks at the baptism of James VI. Captain James Cullen was made "searcher of the Inglismen" in July 1566, a kind of customs officer for cross-border market traders. He was said to be a follower of the Earl of Bothwell. The footmen were the "waged men of war" mentioned in the first band of the Confederate Lords made on 16 June 1567.

From July 1566, the soldiers' wages were paid monthly to Captains Robert and Hugh Lauder, Alexander Stewart and James Cullen, for wages of the footmen, the "four captains of footmen of war". In February 1567, Mary was at Seton Palace and the gates were guarded by Captain Cullen, who was said by William Drury to have the greatest credit with the queen.

According to the Book of Articles, John Stewart of Traquair as a senior captain of the guard attended Mary's bedchamber at Holyroodhouse on the night of the murder of Lord Darnley. Mary bought James Savoy a new banner in April 1567 and he subsequently served as a trumpeter at the coronation of James VI, at the siege of Dunbar Castle in September 1567, and at the opening of Parliament in July 1578.

== Battles of Carberry Hill and Langside ==
Mary went to open Parliament in April 1567 escorted by her guard armed with firearms rather than accepting the "ancient custom" of a guard provided by the bailies of Edinburgh. According to William Drury, soldiers in the hall at Edinburgh Castle were mutinous and demanded payment. Bothwell argued with one soldier and there was nearly a fight. They were promised 400 crowns, two crowns to each man. At the battle of Carberry Hill, Mary and Bothwell had 200 soldiers armed with hagbut firearms commanded by Alexander Stewart and Hew Lauder of the guard, or as David Calderwood says, by Captain Anstruther, the Captain of Inchkeith.

John Stewart of Cardonald signed the band made at Hamilton in support of Mary after her escape from Lochleven. Captain Anstruther was captured and made prisoner at the battle of Langside. Alexander Stewart, the captain of the footmen, was killed. Other captains and "wagers" (professional soldiers) who fought for Mary at Langside include Peter Bairdy, John Mayne, Captain Patrick Fleming, Captain David Melville (a brother of William Kirkcaldy of Grange), Captain David Wemyss, Captain James Moffat, and Captains Alexander and John Coutts.

Robert Lauder fought for Mary at Langside, and was forfeited by Parliament as a supporter of the Hamiltons in August 1568. Afterwards, he carried letters for Mary between England, Scotland, France. Regent Moray's secretary John Wood wrote that Lauder was, apart from his support for the deposed Queen, in his "other qualities a very reasonable gentleman". Lauder was rehabilitated in Scotland at the end of Morton's regency.

Jacques Guillaume, who had been a soldier for Mary since at least 1561, stayed in Scotland and worked for the Regents.

== Under James VI ==
James's French favourite, Esmé Stewart, 1st Duke of Lennox, was made Captain of the King's Guard in March 1581, with powers to raise 30 men and appoint a lieutenant. In June 1581, the number serving at any time was limited to 30 allowing the other 30 guards leave to attend their other business. A larger royal guard was established for James VI in October 1582 by the Gowrie Regime. Colonel William Stewart was ordered to instruct his men not to take part in private quarrels or feuds in Edinburgh or other places where the King resided.

The guard came to be funded by payments made to James by Elizabeth I. In 1588, rival courtiers including the Master of Glamis, Alexander Lindsay, and the Earl of Huntly competed for the position of Captain of the Guard. John Carmichael was Captain of the Guard in the 1590s.

== See also ==
- Scottish Guards (France)
- Scots Guards
- Royal Company of Archers
