= Montrose Basin =

River estuary and nature reserve in Angus, Scotland

Coordinates: 56.70818°N 2.50305°W

Designations

Ramsar Wetland
- Official name: Montrose Basin
- Designated: 3 February 1995
- Reference no.: 716

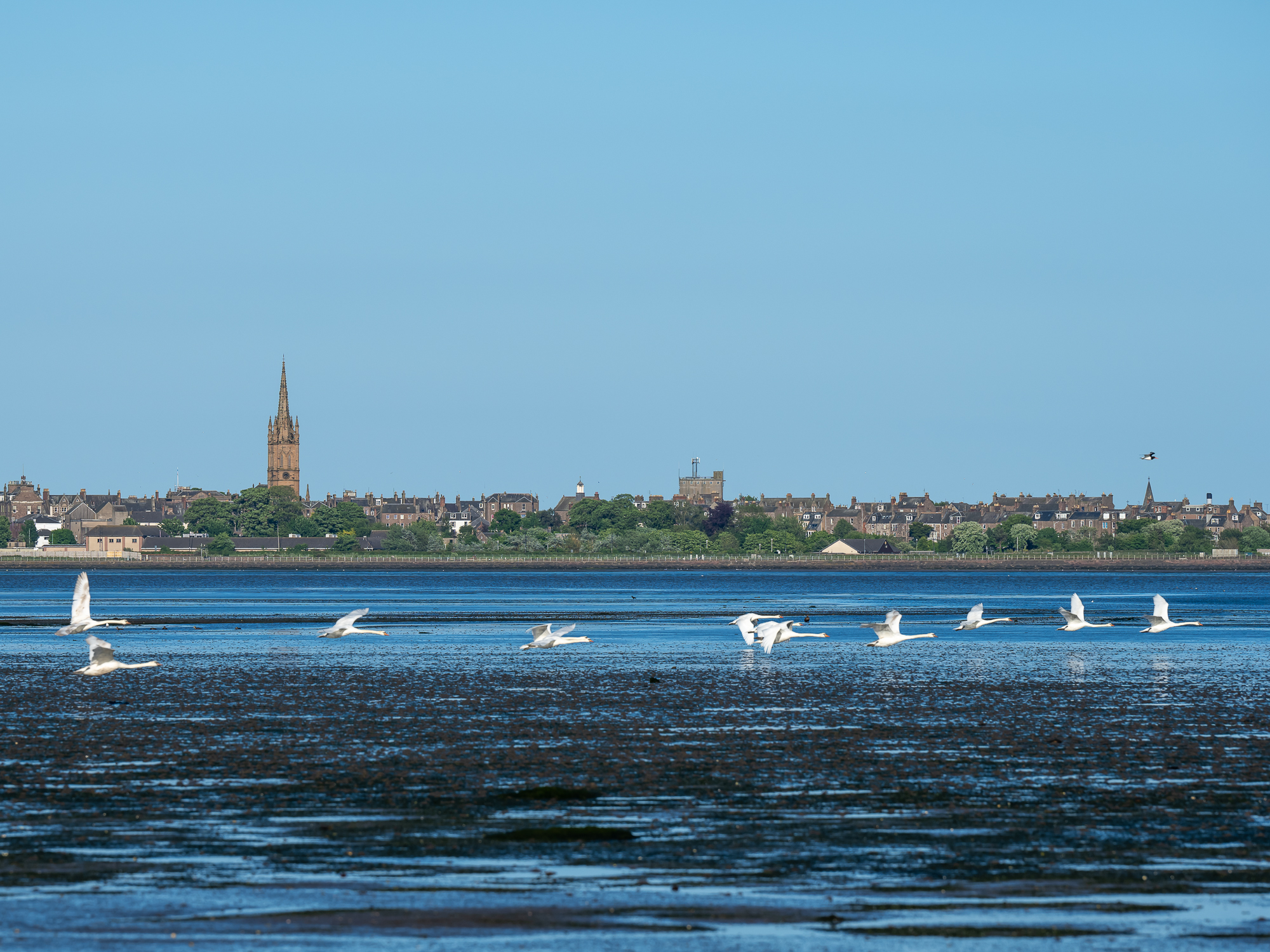
Montrose Basin, Angus, Scotland

Montrose Basin is a nearly circular tidal basin which makes up part of the estuary of the River South Esk and which sits just inland of the town of Montrose in Angus on the east coast of Scotland. The basin is protected by a number of designations; it is managed by the Scottish Wildlife Trust as a Wildlife Reserve, as well as being designated as a Local Nature Reserve, Site of Special Scientific Interest, a Special Protection Area and a Ramsar Site.

== Habitat ==
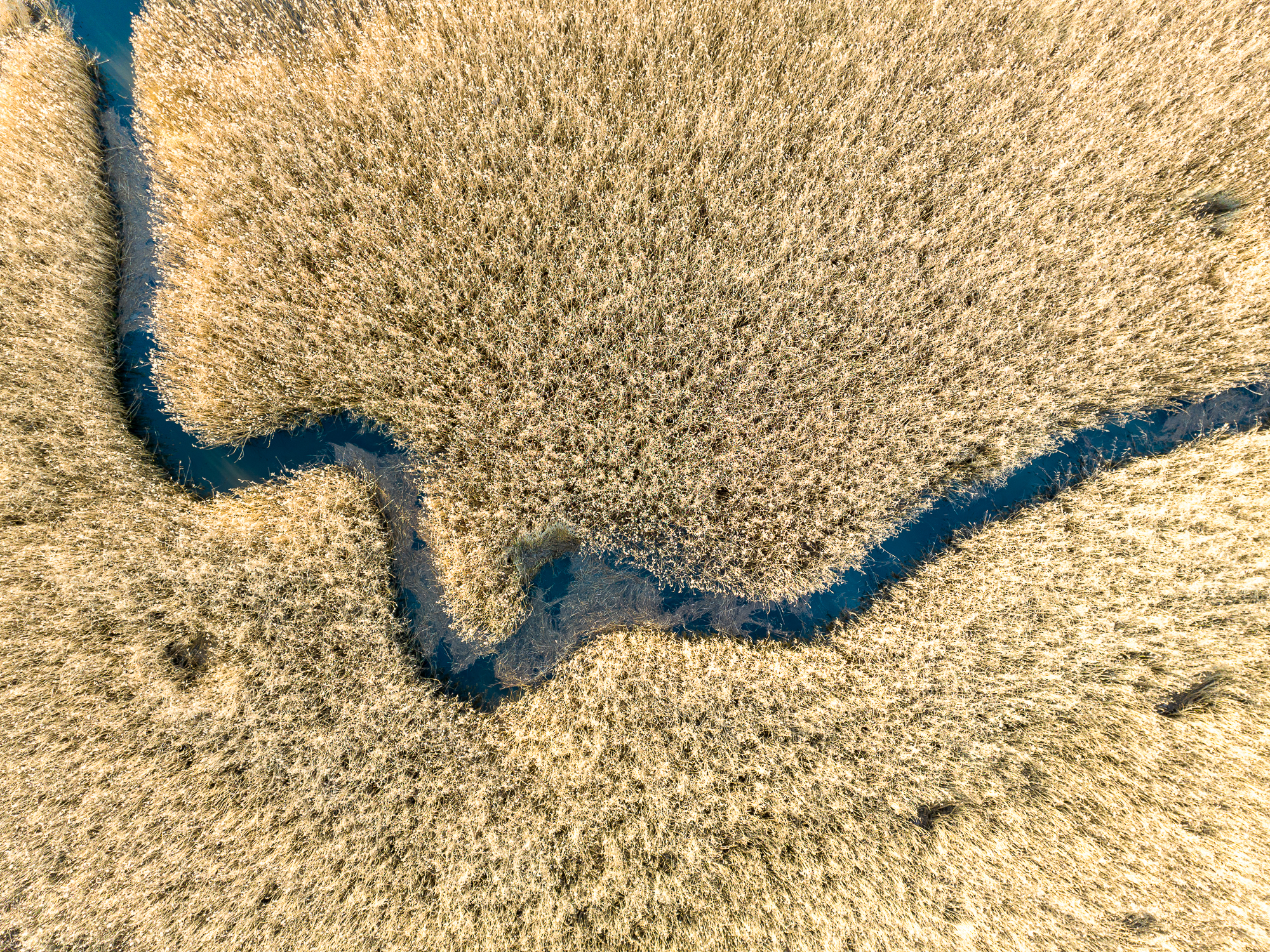
The usual swamp area, Montrose Basin, Angus, Scotland

The enclosed tidal basin has a variety of habitats within it from exposed tidal mudflats to saltmarsh, reedbed and fen and its surroundings of arable farmland and pasture. The section of the basin at Maryton is an important site for the study of the sea level fluctuations following the end of the last glaciation. The SPA includes the small, eutrophic freshwater loch called Dun's Dish. The basin contains the largest area of saltmarsh in Angus.

== Wildlife ==
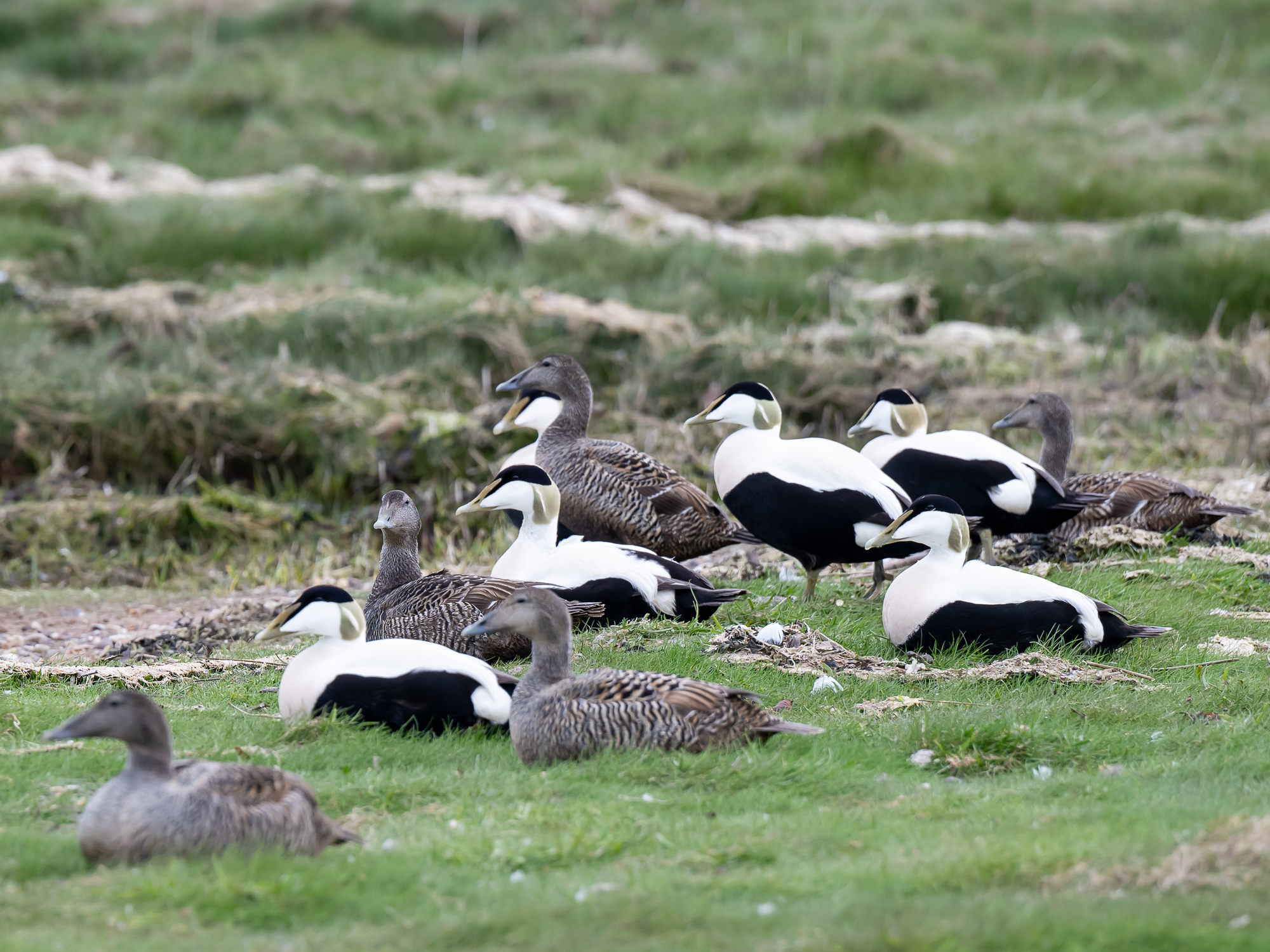
Common Eiders, Montrose Basin, Angus, Scotland

The extensive mudflats are home to large populations of invertebrates, especially annelid worms, the snail Hydrobia and the amphipod Corophium. There are also beds of mussels Mytilus edulis. The flora includes beds consisting of three species of eel grass, Zostera, and algae. The mudflats support numbers of waders and wildfowl including Eurasian oystercatcher, common redshank, red knot, mute swan, Eurasian wigeon and common eider. Large flocks of pink-footed goose and greylag goose use the basin to roost in and feed in the surrounding farmland. As well as wintering eiders the basin supports a large breeding population. In all 213 species of bird have been recorded on the basin, most being winter visitors or passage migrants and just over 50 species are thought to breed.

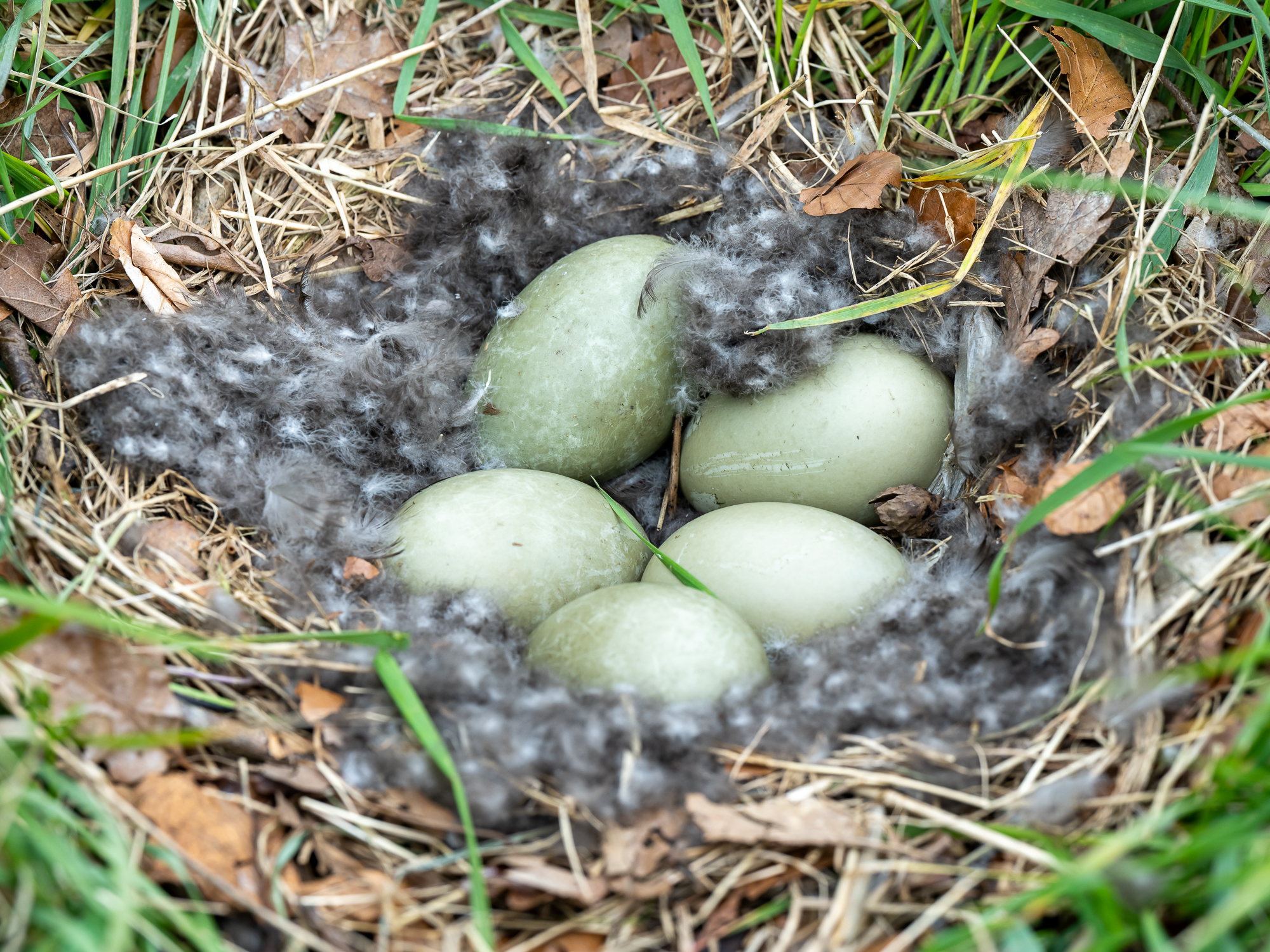
Common Eider nest, Montrose Basin, Angus, Scotland

A visitor centre was opened on the south side of the basin at Rossie Braes by the Scottish Wildlife Trust in 1995.

== History ==
The Montrose Basin Heritage Society was formed in 1999 to bring together information about the basin, including its history and archaeology. The oldest evidence for humans in the area dating back as far as over 3,000 BCE, this being the linear monument, known as the cursus, which runs from Powis to Old Montrose.

The Basin has been exploited for its seafood, especially the Atlantic salmon but commercial fisheries for this species ended in 2018; and mussel cultivation gave it the largest mussel beds in the country during the 19th and early 20th centuries.

The Montrose Basin was hit by a tsunami in 6,100 BCE, generated by the massive underwater Storegga Slide, in Norway. It was 70 feet (21 m) high when it hit the basin, with the waters travelling inland as far as Forfar.

== See also ==
- House of Dun
- George Wishart of Drymme
- Tsunamis affecting the British Isles
