= Robert Anstruther (soldier) =

Scottish soldier

Robert Anstruther (died 1583) was a Scottish soldier in the service of Mary of Guise and Mary, Queen of Scots, and was Captain of Inchkeith. He was an ensign of the Gardes Écossaises.

== Career ==
Robert Anstruther was probably a son of John Anstruther of Anstruther in Fife and his second wife, Elizabeth Spens. James Anstruther of that Ilk was his nephew.

He wrote a letter to Mary of Guise regarding the service of two soldiers and a recommended promotion. The letter is not dated, but probably was written during her Regency between 1554 and 1560.

In July 1561 Mary, Queen of Scots, who was at Méru near Beauvais and north of the Château de Saint-Germain-en-Laye, gave orders that Anstruther should receive Dunbar Castle from its French keeper, Corbeyran de Cardaillac Sarlabous, with its cannon and ammunition according to an inventory made by Robert Hamilton of Briggis. He was also to take command of the fortress on the Island of Inchkeith from Captain Lussaignet. The letters were made by Secretary Raulet (d. 1574), whose wife was later Mary's servant.

Anstruther travelled from Mary's household at Méru to Edinburgh, bringing his commission to be captain of Inchkeith and Dunbar Castle. He arrived on 14 August 1561, also bringing the news from the French court that Mary, Queen of Scots was returning to Scotland after 13 years in France.

== Inchkeith and Dumbarton ==
Anstruther went to Inchkeith on 12 September 1561 to repair the fortress on the island, which had been constructed for Mary of Guise in 1555. He brought the Master of Work William MacDowall and craftsmen and gunners including David Rowan, the metal-workers Adam Hamilton and John Biccarton, and the glazier Steven Loch who provided a window for Anstruther's chamber. Workmen were equipped with spades, picks and mattocks, and chisels to unspike the cannon left on the island. His lieutenant was John Beaton of Balfour (Beaton married Robert's sister Agnes Anstruther). Two senior soldiers were on double pay, and three boatmen were retained to serve the island, Captain Lumsden, and Thomas and Alexander Northgate. There was a prisoner on Inchkeith, George Laidlaw.

In April 1562, Anstruther was made captain of Dumbarton Castle, after Duke of Chatelherault was forced to resign the keepership due to the actions of his son James Hamilton, 3rd Earl of Arran. He travelled to Dumbarton from St Andrews and was installed by the Marchmont Herald, Adam McCulloch. He employed five watch men at Dumbarton.

Payments to Robert Anstruther for garrisoning Inchkeith in 1564 mention his lieutenant and two soldiers on double pay. Inchkeith usually had a garrison of forty soldiers. It was provisioned and reinforced with extra artillery in 1565 and 1566. Surplus provisions were returned to Tantallon and to Leith but failed to find buyers. One of the Leith sea captains who made trips to Leith for Robert Anstruther was John Downie. In 1580 Downie brought plague to Edinburgh from Denmark in his ship the William and his crew was quarantined on the islands of Inchcolm and Inchkeith. His son John Downie, who was also a skipper in Leith, presented James VI of Scotland with a porcupine.

== Battle of Carberry ==
Robert Anstruther rode with John Beaton (a cousin of John Beaton of Balfour) to join Mary, Queen of Scots, and Bothwell at Dunbar Castle before the battle of Carberry Hill. His report (translated into French) is an important source for these events. David Calderwood wrote that Captain Anstruther commanded 200 musketeers of the royal guard for Mary and Bothwell at Carberry, although some writers say Alexander Stewart and Hew Lauder led these troops.

== Later life ==
Anstruther continued at Inchkeith under Regent Moray and received wages for soldiers there in June 1568 including Bartraham Companye, William Lowriestoun, Julian Rowan, David Scraling, George Lafont, John Carruthers, and Archie Blackwood.

In January 1568 Regent Moray authorised the demolition of the fort and granted Anstruther the use and sale of salvaged materials from the accommodation including slates, roof timbers, doors, windows, iron yetts, and storage girnels. In February 1568 Moray granted him lands and the castle at Ormiston in Eckford and "Goven's lands" at Maxton in Roxburghshire, which had been forfeited by James Ormiston for treason for his involvement in the murder of Lord Darnley.

An entry in the register of burials at Anstruther gives his date of death as 20 November 1583, and describes him as an "enseinzie to the Scottis Garde in France".
