= Inchkeith =

Island in Scotland

Innse Coit (Gaelic)

Location
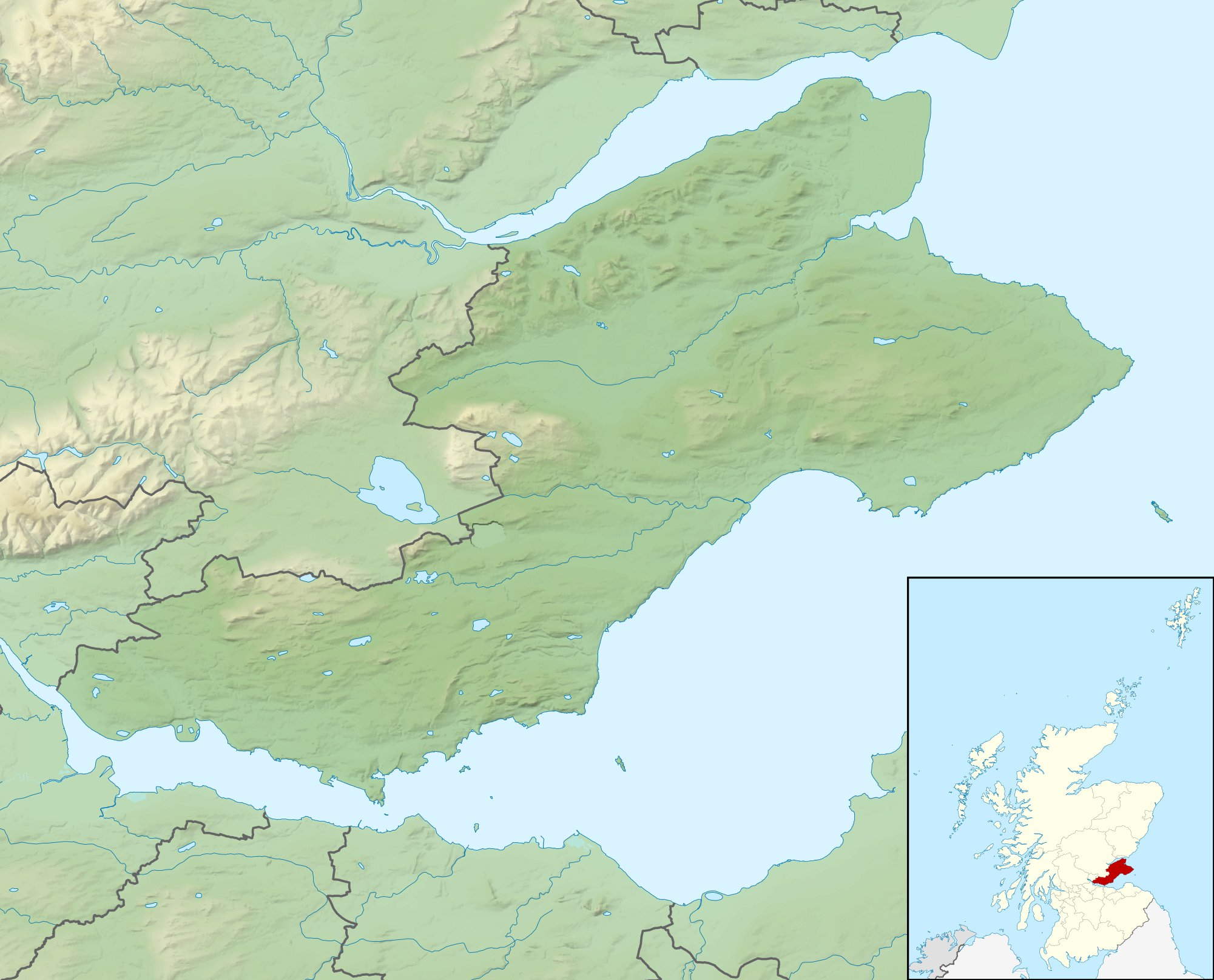
- Inchkeith shown within the Firth of Forth
- OS grid reference: NT293826
- Coordinates: 56.033333°N 3.135°W

Name
- Name meaning: wooded island or Coeddi's island

Physical geography
- Island group: Islands of the Forth
- Area: 22.9 hectares (57 acres)
- Highest elevation: 60 m (200 ft)

Administration
- Council area: Fife
- Country: Scotland
- Sovereign state: United Kingdom

Demographics
- Population: 0

Inchkeith Lighthouse
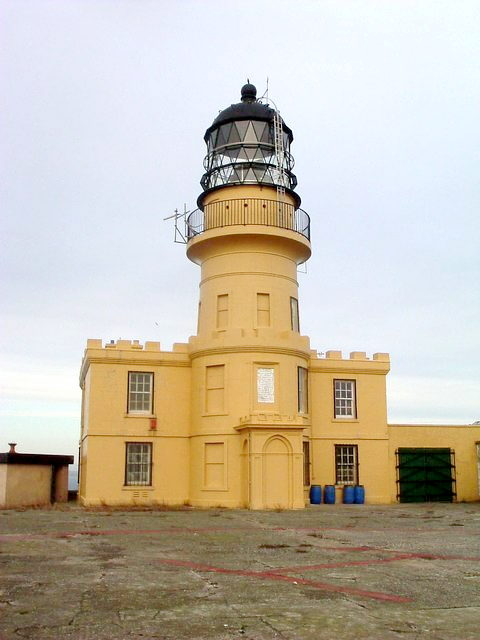
- Inchkeith Lighthouse
- Location: Inchkeith; Fife; Scotland; United Kingdom
- Coordinates: 56.033232°N 3.136643°W
- Constructed: 1804
- Construction: stone tower
- Automated: 1986
- Height: 19 metres (62 ft)
- Shape: cylindrical tower with balcony and lantern attached to a 2-storey keeper's house
- Markings: Ochre tower and building, black lantern
- Operator: Forth Ports PLC
- Fog signal: Org. 2 blasts of 3.5s. every 90s. Replaced in 1958 4 blasts of 1.5s. every 60 s. Decommissioned c. 2004

Light
- Focal height: 67 metres (220 ft)
- Light source: diesel engines
- Intensity: 269,280 candela ?
- Range: 14 nautical miles [26 km]
- Characteristic: Fl W 15s 67m 14M Inchkeith dome [Fl. 0.4s-14.6s]

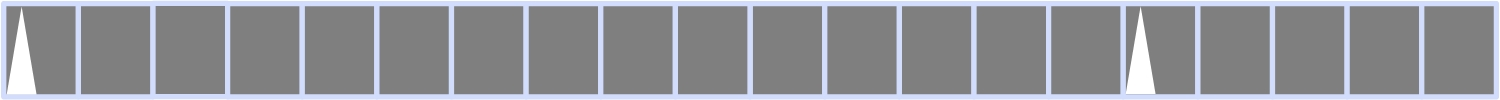

Inchkeith (from the Scottish Gaelic: Innis Cheith) is an island in the Firth of Forth, Scotland, administratively part of the Fife council area.

Inchkeith has had a colourful history as a result of its proximity to Edinburgh, its strategic location for use as a home for Inchkeith Lighthouse, and for military purposes defending the Firth of Forth from attack from shipping and more recently protecting the upstream Forth Bridge and Rosyth Dockyard. Inchkeith has, by some accounts, been inhabited (intermittently) for almost 1,800 years.

== Geography, geology and climate ==
The island lies in the midst of the Firth of Forth, midway between Kirkcaldy to the north and Leith to the south. Due to the undulation of the Fife coast it lies substantially closer to Fife rather than Midlothian, the closest settlement being Kinghorn to the north, with Burntisland to the north-west being only slightly more distant.

Although most of the island is of volcanic origin, the island's geology is surprisingly varied. As well as the igneous rock, there are also some sections of sandstone, shale, coal and limestone. The shale contains a great number of fossils. There are several springs on the island.

The island has the lowest average rainfall in Scotland at 550 millimetres (21.7 in) annually.

The island has an abundance of springs, as noted by James Grant. James Boswell noted two wells on the island during his visit, and speculated as to the former existence of a third within the Castle.

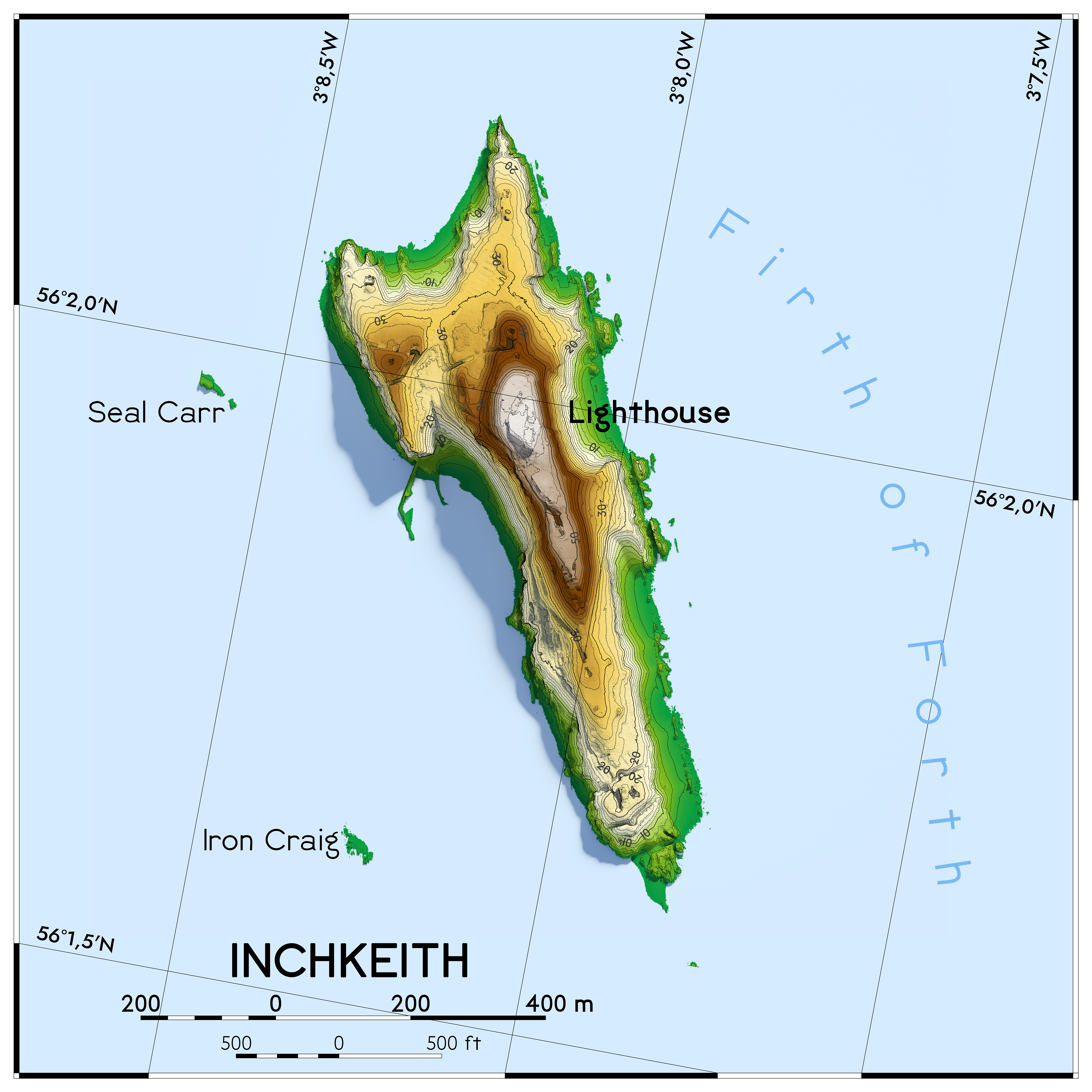
Topographic map of Inchkeith

== History ==
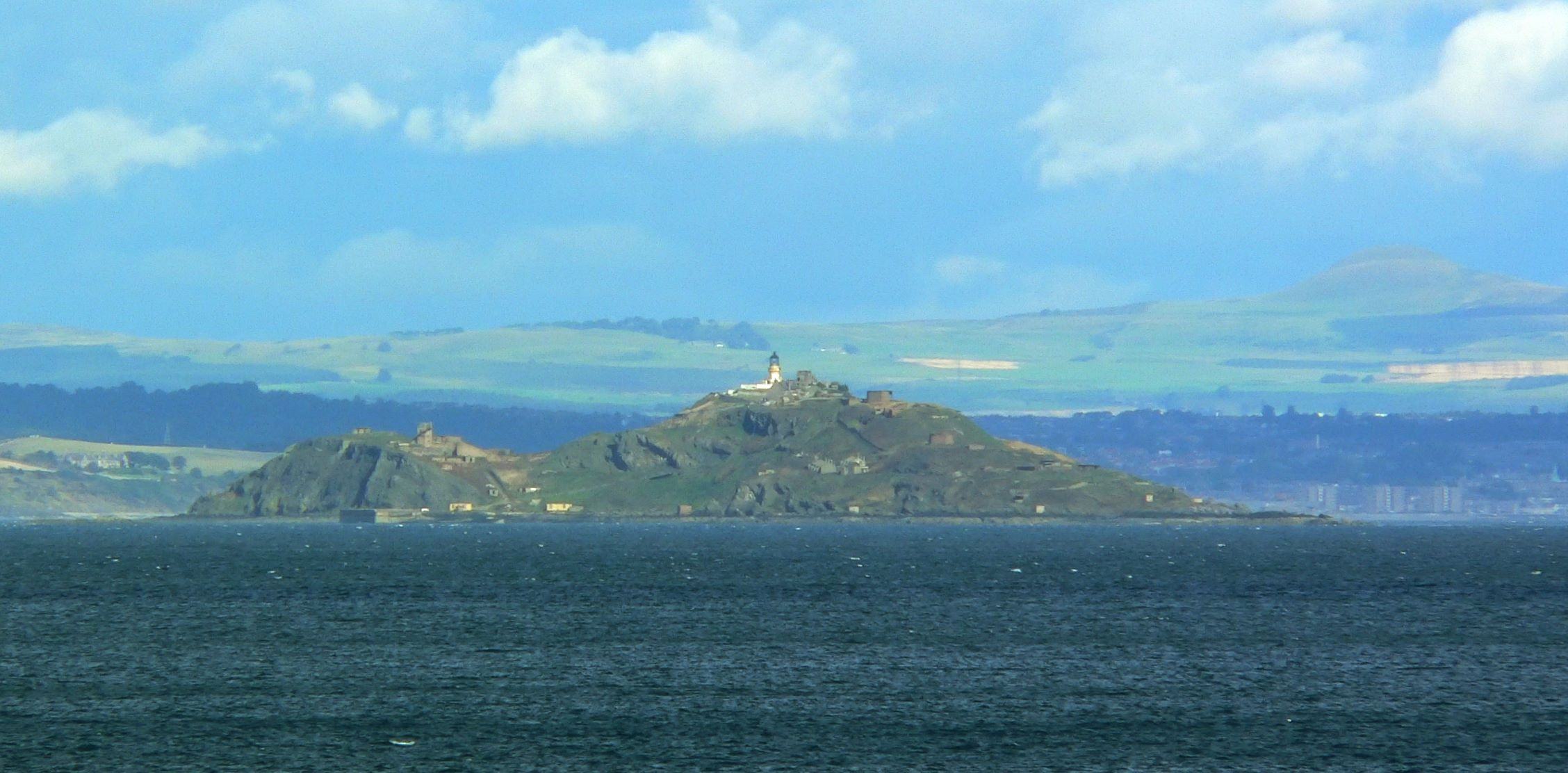
Inchkeith from Portobello, Edinburgh

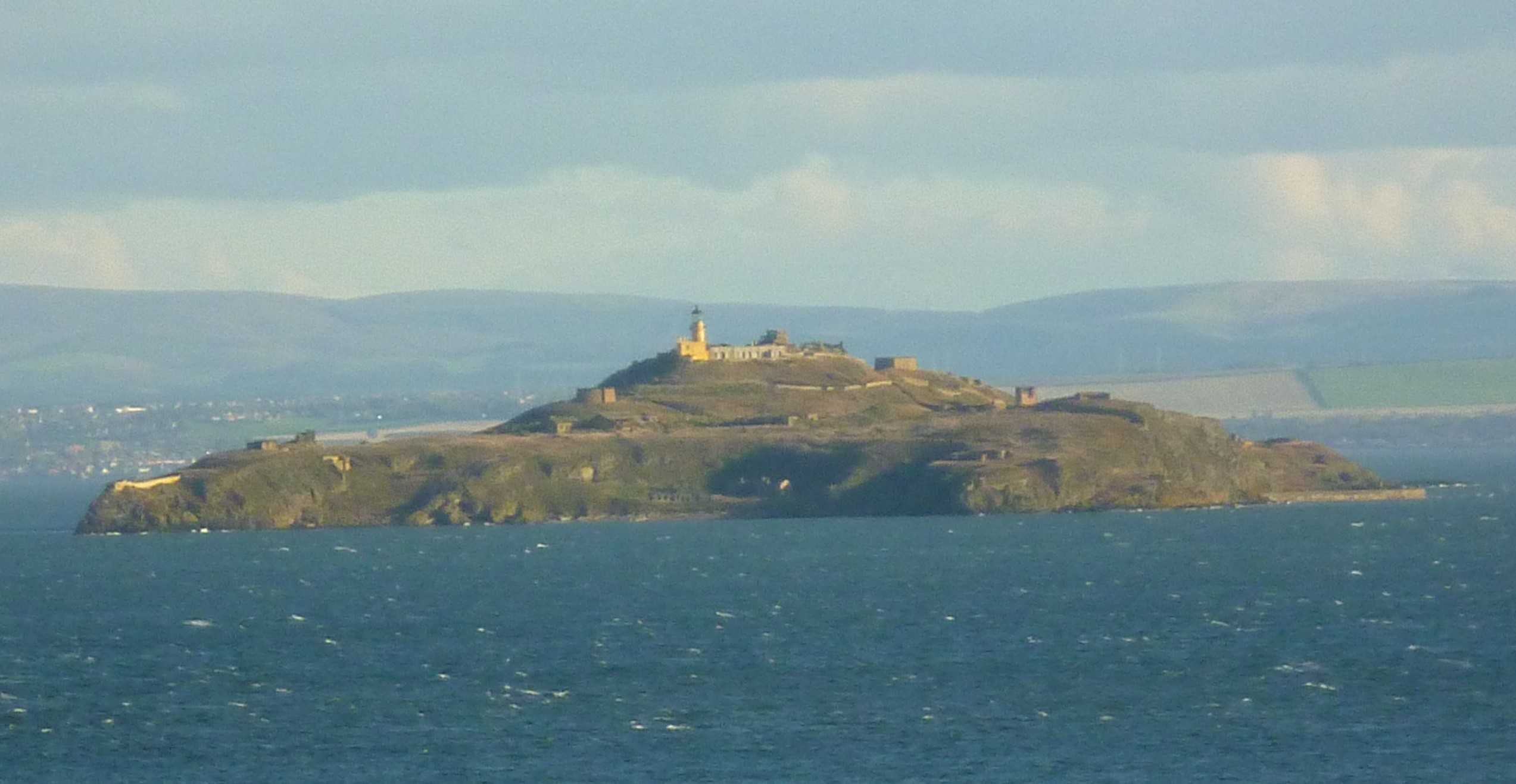
Inchkeith from Kinghorn, Fife

=== Etymology ===
The name "Inchkeith" may derive from the medieval Scottish Gaelic Innse Coit, meaning "wooded island". The latter element coit, in Old Welsh coet, is from the Proto-Celtic *cēto-, "wood". The late 9th century Sanas Cormaic, authored by Cormac mac Cuilennáin, suggests that the word had disappeared from the Gaelic of Ireland by that period, becoming coill; he states "coit coill isin chombric", that is, "coit is Welsh for wood", and explains that the Irish place-name Sailchoit is partly derived from Welsh. Although Scottish Gaelic was closer to Brythonic than Irish was, the Life of St Serf (written before 1180) calls the island Insula Keð, suggesting the possibility that the specific element in Inchkeith was not comprehensible to that hagiography's anonymous author or translator; if we could be sure that the author was Scottish, rather than an English or French incomer, this could be taken to mean that the word was probably not comprehensible even in Fife Gaelic in the 12th century. Since Gaelic had all but disappeared as a language spoken natively in southern Fife by the mid-14th century, there is no continuous Gaelic tradition for the name, but the modern form is Innis Cheith.

Such a rocky and exposed island can however never have supported many trees so it would be reasonable that the derivation may be otherwise. Early associations between Saint Adomnán and the island may indicate that the second element is derived from the name of his contemporary and associate Coeddi (or Céti), bishop of Iona.

=== Earliest history ===
Almost nothing is known about the early history of Inchkeith, and there is no certain reference to the island until the 12th century. In the days when people were compelled to cross the Firth of Forth by boat as opposed to bridge, the island was a great deal less isolated, and on the ferry routes between Leith/Lothian and Fife. Like nearby Inchcolm and the Isle of May, Inchkeith was attacked repeatedly by English raiders in the 14th century. This was the period when the Scottish Wars of Independence were in full swing, and decisive battles were being fought in the Lothians and in the Stirling/Bannockburn region, and so the island was effectively in the route of any supply or raiding vessels.

It is unknown who owned Inchkeith from the 8th century onward, but it is known that it was the property of the Crown until granted to Lord Glamis.

=== Inchkeith as quarantine ===
In 1497, the island was (along with Inchgarvie, a few miles away) used as an isolated refuge for victims of 'grandgore' (also spelled 'glandgore'), an old Scots name for 'syphilis', in Edinburgh. The 'grandgor' was recognised in the 1497 Minutes of the Town Council of Edinborough (Phil. Trans. XLII. 421) "This contagious sickness callit the Grandgor.". The Grandgore Act was passed in September 1497, causing Inchkeith, as well as other islands in the Firth, such as Inchgarvie, to be made a place of "Compulsory Retirement" for people suffering from this disease. They were told to board a ship at Leith and once there, "to remain till God provide for their health". It is probable that they all died.

In 1589, history repeated itself and the island was used to quarantine the passengers of a plague-ridden ship. More plague sufferers came here from the mainland in 1609. In 1799, Russian sailors who died of an infectious disease were buried here.

=== James IV's linguistic experiment ===
During the reign of James IV of Scotland, Inchkeith was allegedly the site of a language deprivation experiment. Robert Lyndsay of Pitscottie wrote in a chronicle that in 1493, James IV directed that a mute woman and two infants be transported to the island, to ascertain which language the infants would grow up to speak isolated from the rest of the world. This speech, in contemporary theory, would be the "original" language, or the "language of God". Pitscottie's version of the story was:

Scots original

And also the king gart tak ane dum woman and pat hir in Inchekeytht and gaif hir tua young bairnes in companie witht hir, and gart furnische them of all necessar thingis pertening to thair nourischment that is to say, meit, drink, fyre and candell, claithis, with all uther kynd of necessaris quhilk (is) requyrit to man or woman, desyrand the effect heirof to come to knaw quhat langage (or, "leid") thir bairnes wald speik quhene they cam to lauchfull aige. Some sayis they spak goode hebrew bot as to myself I knaw not bot be the authoris reherse.

Translation:
English translation

The king ordered a mute woman to be put on Inchkeith and gave her two young children in company with her, and provided them with everything they would need for their nourishment, food, drink, fire and candle, clothes, and all other kinds of necessities needed by man or woman. He was desirous to discover what language the children would speak when they came of proper age. Some say they spoke good Hebrew, but I myself know no more than my sources say.

However, there are no contemporary sources or documents describing such an experiment, and modern historians consider the story implausible. James IV took a boat from Leith to the island on 20 June 1502 and went on to Kinghorn.

=== Rough Wooing, Reformation, and the 17th century ===
In the 16th century, the island was the subject of fighting during the war of the Rough Wooing. A fort on the island was damaged by an English force in May 1544. The English commander Duke of Somerset garrisoned the island in 1547 after the Battle of Pinkie Cleugh. His force of marines was ordered to reinforce the island, so they built a large square fort, with corner towers, on the site of the present day lighthouse. A French soldier, Jean de Beaugué, described how the building works were visible from Leith in June 1548. De Beaugué wrote that four companies of English soldiers and a company of Italians were ordered to help the English workmen, who were "pioneers" not soldiers.

The English admiral Edward Fiennes de Clinton anchored his fleet at Inchkeith in August 1548. His task was to prevent sea traffic in the Forth and the security of the English at the siege of Haddington. Clinton reported destroying 38 ships on 9 August 1548. French galleys lay off Burntisland. His duty in the Forth prevented him coming to aid John Luttrell at Broughty Castle.

The garrison was ejected by a combined Franco-Scottish force under General D’Essé (André de Montalembert, Sieur de Essé) on 19 or 29 June 1549. Jean de Beaugué describes Monsieur de le Chapelle's injury while leading his German troops against the Italians and English who made a stand on the summit of the hill. On the following day, Mary of Guise, the regent, visited the island, to see the "three and four hundred of her dead foes still unburied". Since 29 June was Fête Dieu in France, she renamed the island "L’Île de Dieu". The soldiers also nicknamed it "L’Île des Chevaux" (The island of horses). Neither name stuck. Seven English banners captured on the island were sent to Henri II of France. On 17 July 1549, he gave the soldiers who brought the banners lifetime pensions. On 22 June Regent Arran's Privy Council ordered that all the towns and burghs on both sides of the Forth should contribute a workforce of 400 men to strengthen the fortifications, and pay their wages of two shillings for 16 days.

After the end of the war of the Rough Wooing, the island was occupied by the French, under Mary of Guise, during her period as the Regent of Scotland between 1554 and 1560. The old English fortifications were further strengthened by the Scots and French, who under D’Essé built a larger and stronger fort. The works may have been directed by the Italian architect and military engineer Lorenzo Pomarelli. Accounts for this rebuilding written in French survive with the names of the Scottish craftsmen and women who worked there in 1555. The French-born gunner and carpenter Andrew Mansioun supervised a team of twenty three horses on the island. Further construction work in 1558 was supervised by the master of work, William MacDowall.

During the siege of Leith, the English commander Grey of Wilton obtained a description of the fortress as it stood on 17 April 1560. The wall and rampart was 30 feet thick, being 14 feet of stone behind 16 feet of earth. There were 140 French soldiers with 70 women, boys and labourers. As the English admiral William Wynter was trying to blockade the island and cut off supplies, the garrison was eating oysters and periwinkles gathered at low water and fish caught with angling rods. Grey of Wilton thought he could capture the island with 600 men and 10 cannons but was worried that he could not guarantee to support the force on the island once landed if he was attacked elsewhere. After the peace of the Treaty of Edinburgh in September 1560, the English diplomat Thomas Randolph noted that Captain Lucinet and his French garrison remained on Inchkeith, but there were now more women than men, and Edinburgh was called the island "l'Isle des Femmes."

In July 1561, Mary, Queen of Scots made Robert Anstruther captain of the island, in succession to the French Captain Lussaignet. Anstruther was in charge of a garrison of soldiers keeping watch including men with firearms known as "hagbuttaris" from a Scottish form of the word arquebus or haakbus.

Mary inspected the garrison, and a stone from the original gateway with "MR" (i.e. Maria Regina) and the date still exists, built into a wall below the lighthouse. The guns were used during the rebellion against Mary called the Chaseabout Raid. Lord Darnley was sent to inspect the armaments in August 1565. The English ship, The Aide captained by Anthony Jenkinson arrived in the Forth on 25 September 1565, and was bombarded by the cannon on Inchkeith. Jenkynson had intended to blockade Leith to prevent Lord Seton bringing more munitions for Mary from France. The cannon were repaired in Edinburgh Castle by David Rowan, "master melter" of the artillery, who was paid for cleaning out the rusty touch holes in February 1566.

The fort itself was demolished, or ordered to be "raisit" (razed) in 1567, after Mary was deposed. Her opponents were anti-French and did not take too kindly to a French garrison so near the capital. The Captain of the garrison, Robert Anstruther, was rewarded with all the ironwork timber and slates to be salvaged, and ownership of the island was given to John Lyon, 8th Lord Glamis. The remaining buildings were later used as a prison.

Sir John Scott of Scotstarvit bought the island in 1649, and it was later owned by the Buccleuch family, forming part of the property of the Barony of Royston, near Granton.

During the Wars of the Three Kingdoms, the island was again taken by the English, and fortified.

=== 18th century ===
In the late 18th century, James Boswell's The Journal of a Tour to the Hebrides with Samuel Johnson (published in 1785) mentions Inchkeith, upon which Boswell and Dr. Johnson alighted, noting that the now-uninhabited island had a profusion of "luxuriant thistles and nettles", a "strongly built" fort, and "sixteen head of [grazing] black cattle". The fort visited appears to have been built in 1564.

Usually the cynic, Johnson admired the island and said, "I’d have this island; I’d build a house... A rich man of an hospitable turn here, would have many visitors from Edinburgh."

=== 19th century and World War I ===
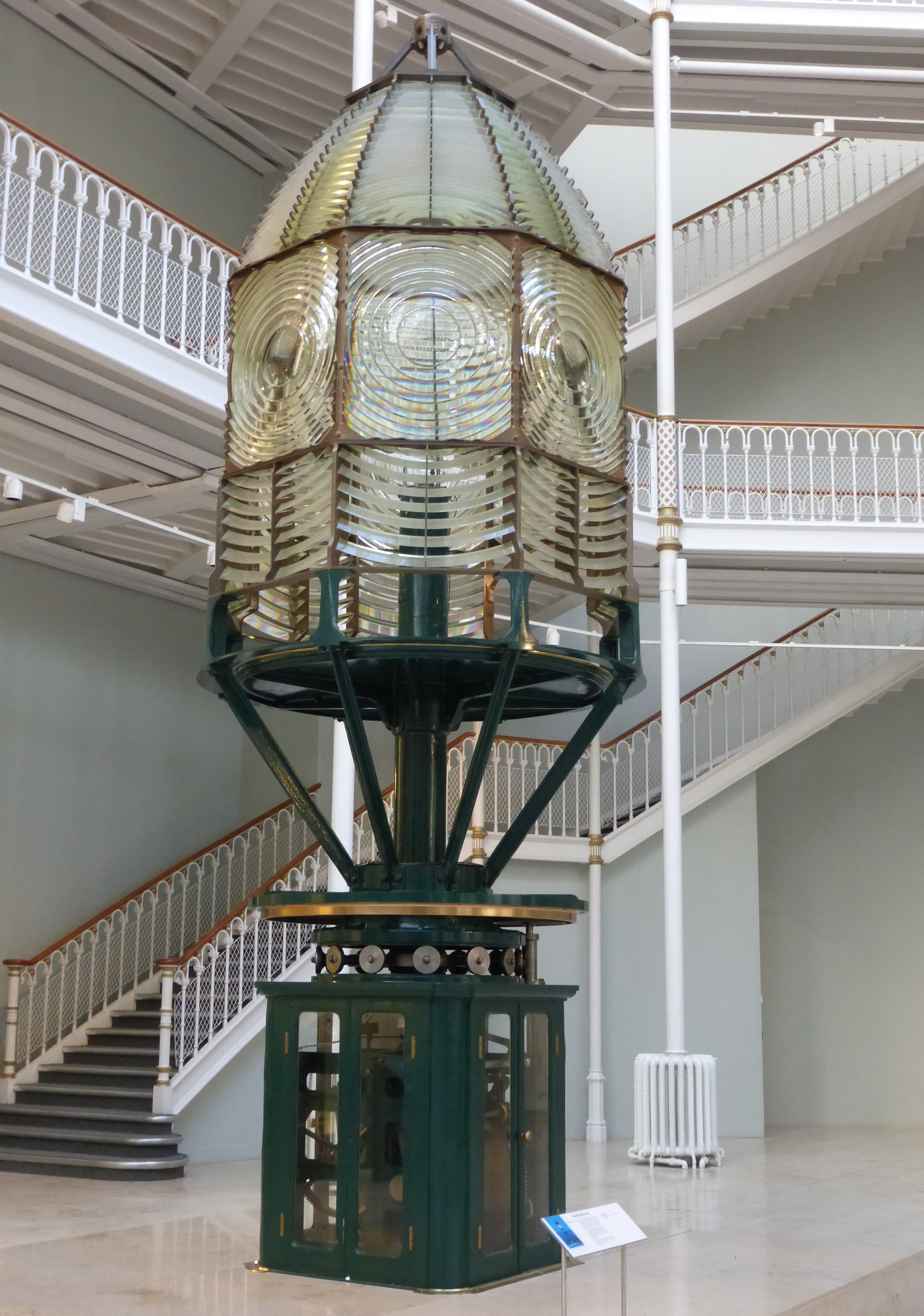
Dioptic lens designed by David A Stevenson for the Inchkeith Lighthouse. It was in use from 1889 until automation was introduced in 1985, now on display at the National Museum of Scotland.

In 1803, construction was begun of Inchkeith Lighthouse, designed and built by Thomas Smith and Robert Stevenson. The lighthouse, standing 67 metres high, was first operational by 1804, and is now listed as a building of architectural and historic significance.

Inchkeith, unlike some of the other islands, was not fortified in the Napoleonic Wars but, with Kinghorn, was the site of the first modern defences, manned from 1881 until 1956. A memorial on the island notes the role of Lord Herbert of Lea in advocating the fortification of the island. In 1878, the Royal Engineers built batteries on the three corners of the island, designed as separate fortresses.

Construction upon the island's "South Fort" began in spring of 1878, being completed in 1880. Construction on the West and East forts began in summer of 1878, being completed in 1880 and 1881 respectively. These forts were armed with four 10" rifled muzzle loader guns, with two in the South Fort and one each in the east and west. In 1891, the East and West guns were replaced with two 6" BL (breech loading) disappearing guns. A 9.2" Mk I gun, also on a disappearing mounting, was installed in 1893, in the southern part of the island.

A controlled minefield was controlled from Inchkeith, and the 'test room' for the Submarine Miners was created in an artificial cave, closed off by a granite wall, on the north side of the island. This was later used as a Small Arms Ammunition store.

In 1899, Inchkeith had a Compressed Air Foghorn installed, providing two 3.5-second blasts every 90 seconds during fog. This would remain in place until replaced after the second world war.

From the 1890s until the early 1905, the fort at Inchkeith underwent a sequence of gun improvements and replacements. In 1893-95 two 4.7" MK1 quick-firing guns were installed. (These had been removed from Fort Paull on the north bank of the Humber (which was disarmed, being deemed to be too close to Hull)). In 1898 the two 10" rifled muzzle loaders in the south fort were dismounted, to be replaced by two 6" Mk VII guns. The two 4.7" guns were replaced by 9.2" BL Mk X guns. By 1905 the armament of the island comprised: 1 x 9.2" Mk I gun on a disappearing mounting; 2 x 9.2" Mk X guns on Central Pedestal mountings; 2 x 6-inch Mk VII guns at the north fort (replacing a single Mk VI 6" on a disappearing mounting); 2 x 6" Mk VII guns in the southern fort. 1906-7 all the 6" guns were removed, leaving only three 9.2" guns in place. By 1911 the shore was being covered in Barbed wire and by the end of the First World War a series of pillboxes had been built on the beaches round the island. By the end of the First World War the island was armed with three 9.2" Mk X guns and six 6" Mk VII guns.

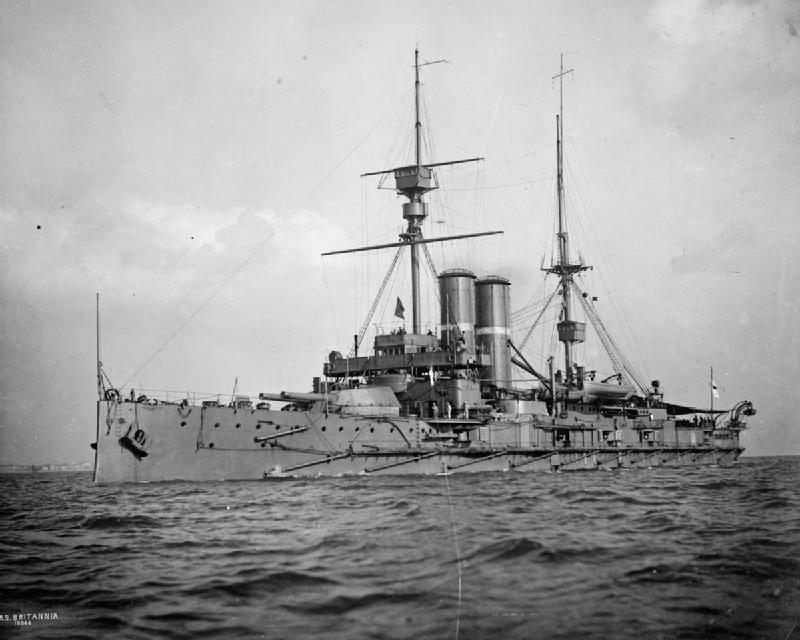
HMS Britannia

During World War I, the Royal Navy battleship HMS Britannia, at the time a part of the 3rd Battle Squadron in the Grand Fleet, ran aground at Inchkeith on 26 January 1915, suffering considerable bottom damage. She was refloated after 36 hours and was repaired and refitted at Devonport Dockyard.

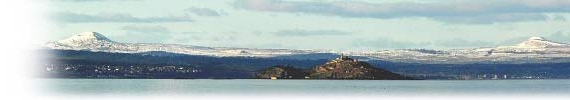
View of a snow-covered Fife, with Inchkeith in the foreground, from Portobello

=== The Second World War ===
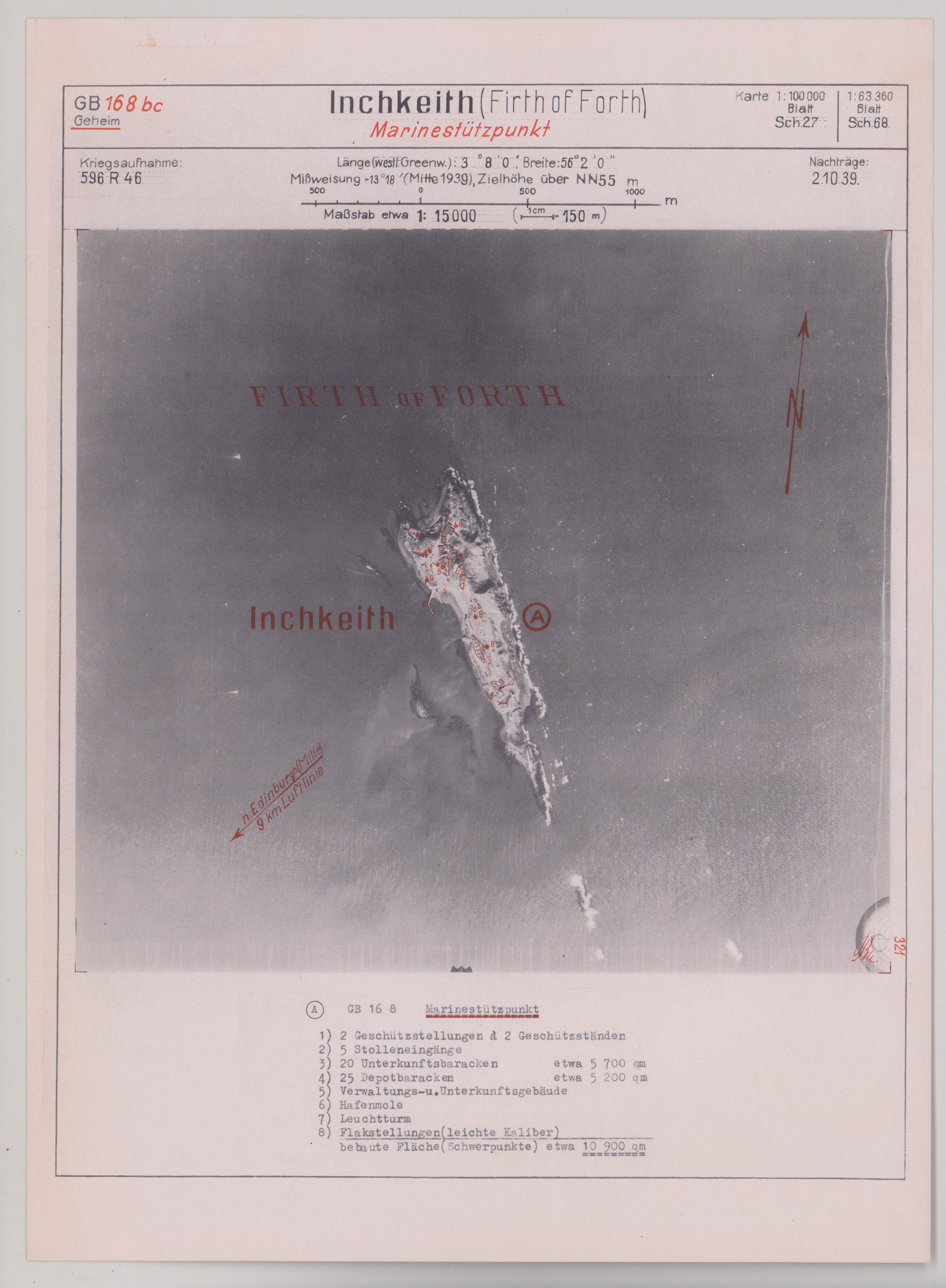
Inchkeith on a target dossier of the German Luftwaffe, 1939

Between the wars the fort and its guns were maintained. In 1937 several Lewis guns were supplied, for anti-aircraft defence, and a pair of 12 Pdr QF guns, which were for drill and practice. In 1938, following the Munich Crisis, the island was further mobilised, and had more Nissen huts installed, presumably for equipment and personnel. On 21 February 1940 a sand-filled dummy shell had to be fired across the bows of the Naval trawler 'Peter Carey', to stop it straying into a mined area; the shell ricocheted off the water and ended up bursting into a tenement flat at 118 Salamander Street in Leith. Fortunately no-one was injured.

Inchkeith was the HQ of the Outer Defences of the Firth of Forth in both wars, in conjunction with batteries at Kinghorn, on the north shore, and Leith on the southern. The defences were designed to protect Edinburgh and the naval anchorage from distant bombardment (the Rosyth Dockyard was out of range), and also to deal with ships attempting to force their way into the naval anchorage beyond the defences, and towards the Forth Rail Bridge and the Rosyth Dockyard. In both wars there were anti-boat and anti-submarine booms across the river at this point, and in the Second World War, there were Induction loops and controlled minefields controlled from Inchkeith.

In the Second World War new batteries were established further east at Elie and Dirleton but Inchkeith remained fully armed.

In May 1940, the island was issued with 40 "Board of Trade, Rocket Flares, Red", for alerting in the event that an invasion was attempted (or spotted).

The gun strength of the island in the Second World War was the same as at the end of the First World War: one "Major Full Time Battery" of two 6" guns covering the North side of the island, two 6" guns covering the South side and the water between the island and Leith, a further two 6" guns in the West Fort, and three 9.2" guns, the purpose of which to tackle any enemy warships standing off to bombard the naval anchorage or the city of Edinburgh. The island was armed for a time with 3" anti-aircraft guns to deal with German aeroplanes dropping magnetic mines. These were replaced by Bren and Bofors guns. The garrison of the island was over 1100 at its peak in the Second World War, with dozens of buildings, emplacements, fire control centres, and Nissen huts, many of which remain in varying states of repair.

==== Operation Fortitude North ====
Operations Fortitude North and Fortitude South were related to a wider deception plan called Operation Bodyguard. Operation Bodyguard was the overall Allied strategic deception plan in Europe for 1944, carried out as part of the build-up to the Invasion of Normandy. The major objective of this plan was to lead the Germans to believe that the invasion of northwestern Europe would come later than was actually planned, and to threaten attacks at other locations than the true objective, including the Pas de Calais, the Balkans, southern France, Norway, and Soviet attacks in Bulgaria and northern Norway.

Operation Fortitude North's fictional British Fourth Army were based in Edinburgh, and spoof radio traffic and Double agents were used as means to disseminate the misinformation. On 3 March 1944, members of a "Special RS (Royal Signals) Unit" from the British Fourth Army landed on Inchkeith, with a detachment of 22 men and 4 officers, with two radio vans. At the beginning of April, a further 40 men arrived, and proceeded to stage mock attacks of the Inchkeith defences via the cliffs, until their departure in September.

The aim of this ruse, unknown to the participants, was to make German High Command believe that a raid in Norway or elsewhere was being planned. Although Operation Fortitude was a great success, Inchkeith appears not to have been overflown by German Reconnaissance planes until 7 October. Examination of the footage taken in 1945 appeared to indicate that the plane flew too high to ascertain anything meaningful.

=== Post-war era to present day ===
Post-war, defences were dismantled commencing late 1945. By early January 1946, only a small number of troops with a "nucleus" of coastal guns remained, and finally in 1956/7, all military use of the island ceased, and ownership passed over to the Northern Lighthouse Board, who performed a variety of renovations on the island from the early 1960s onwards.

The island, like Cramond Island, was previously worked as a farm. It is now abandoned, and unkempt.

In 1958, an experimental foghorn was installed, replacing the previous 19th century system. A diaphone system providing 4 blasts of 1.5 seconds once every minute was installed on Inchcolm, operated by radio telephone from Inchkeith. This was replaced with an electrically operated system controlled by an automatic fog detector in 1986.

In 1971 the lighthouse and associated buildings became Category B listed buildings, and in 1976 the island and its fortifications became a scheduled monument.

In 1986 the lighthouse was automated, allowing it to be remotely managed by a telephone connection. The Northern Lighthouse Board removed the permanent lightkeepers, and sold the island to businessman Tom Farmer (founder of Kwik-Fit). Farmer himself lived in Barnton in Edinburgh. The current lighthouse is powered by nickel-cadmium batteries, "charged on a time cycle of three times per week by one of two (12.5 KVA) markon alternators with TS3 Lister diesel engines."

In 2017, the British Army used Inchkeith during a nighttime exercise involving Chinook helicopters.

== See also ==
- List of islands of Scotland
- List of lighthouses in Scotland
- List of Northern Lighthouse Board lighthouses

== Sources ==
- Grant, James (1890). Old and New Edinburgh. Cassell & Co, London, Paris, New York.
- Samuel, Lewis (1846). A Topographical Dictionary of Scotland. Lewis.
- UKFC. "UK Fortifications Club - Fort of the Quarter - Inchkeith". UK Fortifications Club (UKFC). Archived from the original on 2 September 2006.
- "Scottish History - Renaissance and Reformation - Historical Oddities". BBC.
- Haswell-Smith, Hamish (2004). The Scottish Islands. Edinburgh: Canongate. ISBN 978-1-84195-454-7.
