= Bashkir =

Bashkir may refer to:

- Bashkirs, an ethnic group in Russia, primarily living in Bashkortostan and neighboring countries
- Bashkir language, a Turkic language spoken by the Bashkirs
- A citizen of Bashkortostan
- The American Bashkir Curly, a curly-coated American horse breed
- The Bashkir horse, a horse breed from Bashkortostan in the Russian Federation
- Stefan Bashkir, a character in Eoin Colfer's novel The Supernaturalist
- The V'ornn name for their merchant class, in Eric Van Lustbader's Pearl Saga
- Bashkirs (painting), an 1814 painting by William Allan

== See also ==
- Bashkir State University
- Bashkiria (disambiguation)
