= Frontier Guards (painting) =

Painting by William Allan

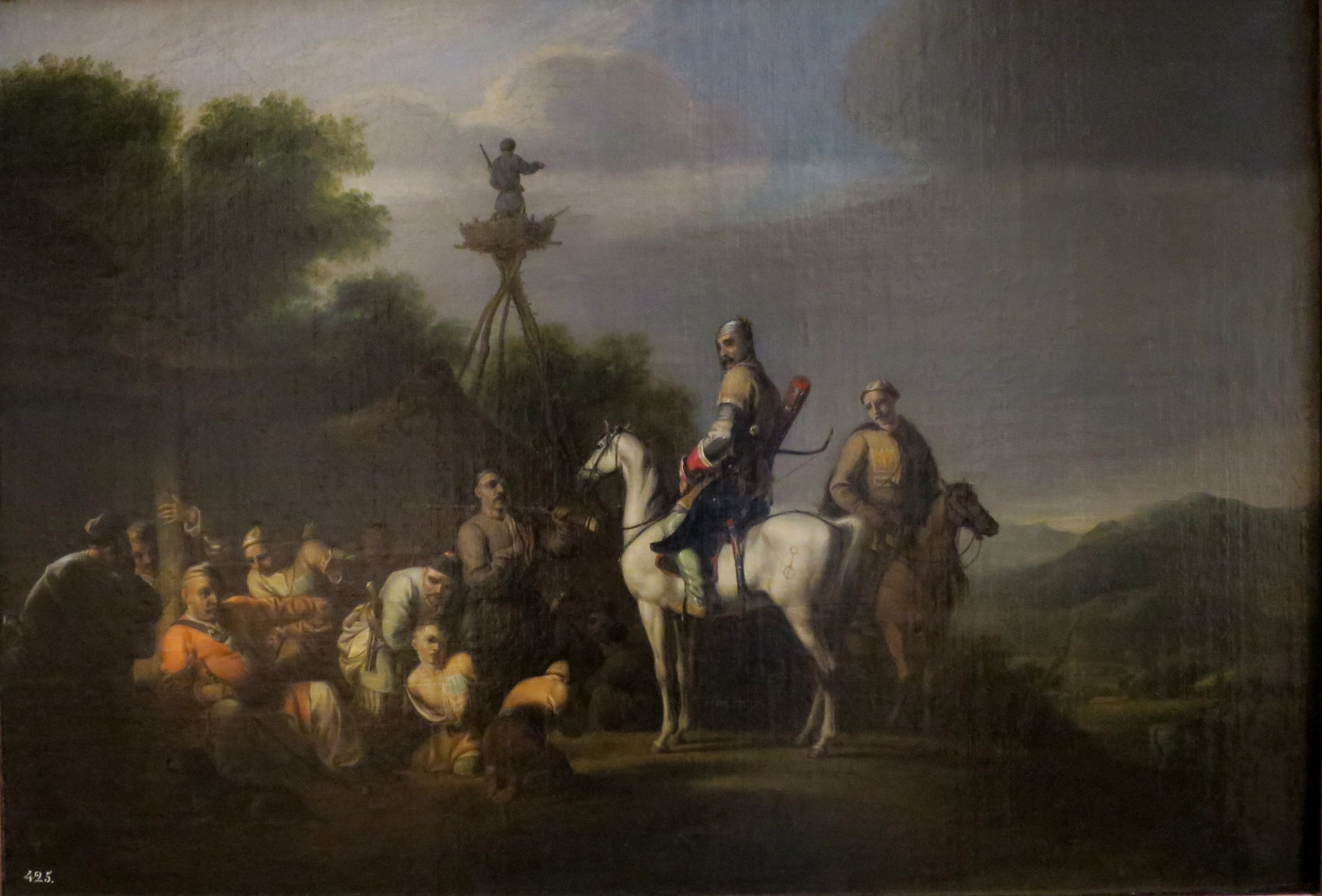
- Artist: William Allan
- Year: c. 1814
- Medium: oil on canvas
- Dimensions: 43 cm × 63 cm (17 in × 25 in)
- Location: Hermitage Museum, Saint Petersburg

The Frontier Guards, also known as The Circassian Prince Selling Two Boys or The Picket of the Muslim Squadron, is an oil on canvas painting by the Scottish artist William Allan, from c. 1814. It is held at the Hermitage, in Saint Petersburg.

== History and description ==
The most likely dating for this work, like its companion piece, Bashkirs, is 1814, in Edinburgh, a reminiscence of Allan's travels through the Caucasus and the Caspian Lowland in 1809-1810.

Unlike the aforementioned painting, here the artist gave a very free interpretation to the characters' costumes and weapons, combining them with details characteristic of Central Asian peoples, like the Caucasians and the Turks. Only one character can be identified with some precision: the man on the white horse, who closely resembles a Circassian.

In 1815, Allan held an exhibition of his works in London, completed upon his return from Russia; here, the current painting was first presented to the public. It then returned to the artist's studio in Edinburgh, where in December 1816, Grand Duke Nikolai Pavlovich, the future Emperor Nicholas I of Russia, visited him, while traveling in Great Britain, and admired the painting. The Scottish press describes the visit and the positive impression caused by the work of Allan: "Having studied the collection of weapons and costumes of the various peoples inhabiting the Russian Empire, he praised the artist for his painstaking work in collecting so many useful materials necessary to correctly depict the manners, habits, and appearance of his compatriots. Grand Duke Nicholas showed considerable taste and meticulousness in choosing several things from among the sketches and paintings. He expressed a wish to see the artist again if he ever had the opportunity to visit Russia again."

At the occasion, the Grand Duke bought three paintings from Allan: Border Guard (the current), Bashkirs, both now at the Hermitage, and Aslan Girey and Alkaziya Crossing the Kuban River, now in the Dagestan Museum of Fine Arts, in Makhachkala.

== Provenance ==
Upon arrival in Russia, the painting was kept in the Anichkov Palace, in Nicholas I's private study. In 1920, the painting was transferred to the Hermitage Museum; in 1929, as part of the sale of part of the Hermitage collections, it was intended to be exported abroad, but in 1931 it was returned to the museum and once again put on permanent display under the finally established title Frontier Guards. It is currently exhibited in the Winter Palace in Hall 301.
