= Henry Stuart, Lord Darnley =

King consort of Scotland from 1565 to 1567

Henry Stuart
- Duke of Albany, Earl of Ross; Lord Darnley
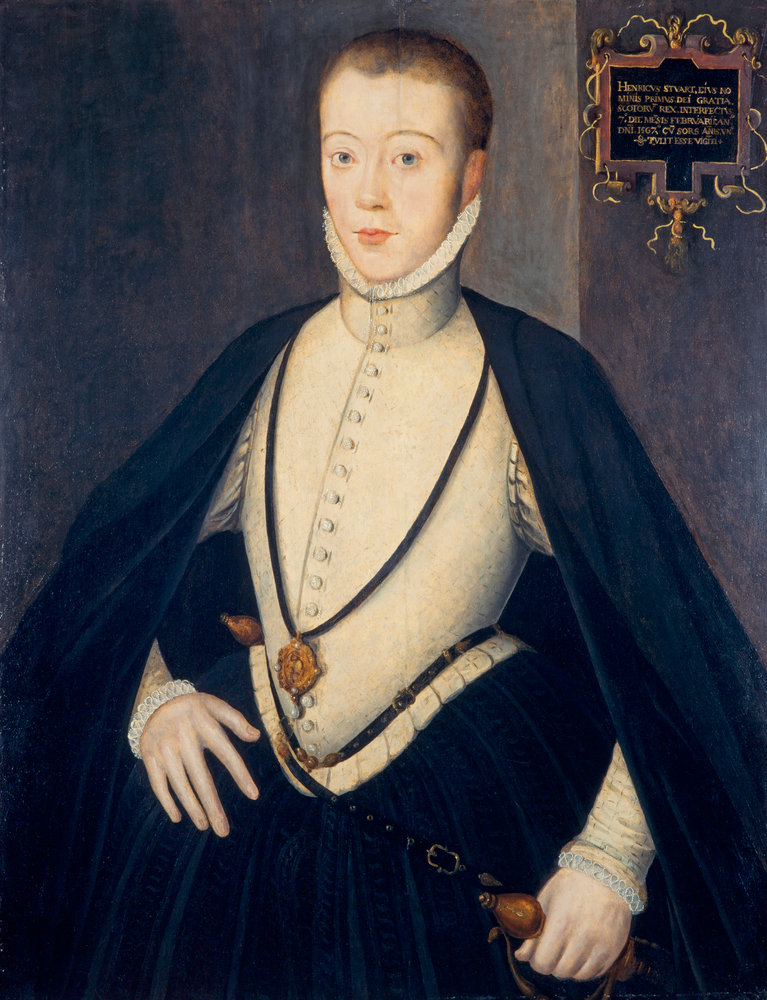
- Lord Darnley in his late teens, by an unknown artist. National Galleries of Scotland.

King consort of Scotland
- Tenure: 29 July 1565 – 10 February 1567
- Born: 1546; Temple Newsam, Yorkshire, England
- Died: 10 February 1567 (aged 20); Kirk o' Field, Edinburgh, Scotland
- Burial: 14 February 1567; Holyrood Abbey
- Spouse: Mary, Queen of Scots (m. 1565)
- Issue: James VI and I
- House: Stuart
- Father: Matthew Stewart, 4th Earl of Lennox
- Mother: Lady Margaret Douglas

Henry Stuart, Lord Darnley (1546 – 10 February 1567) was King of Scotland as the second husband of Mary, Queen of Scots, from 29 July 1565 until his murder. Darnley had one child with Mary, James VI of Scotland and I of England. Less than a year after the birth of his son, Darnley was murdered at Kirk o' Field in 1567. Many contemporary narratives describing his life and death refer to him as simply Lord Darnley, his title as heir apparent to the Earldom of Lennox.

== Origins ==
He was the second, but eldest surviving, son of Matthew Stewart, 4th Earl of Lennox and his wife Lady Margaret Douglas, which supported his claim to the English succession. Darnley's maternal grandparents were Archibald Douglas, 6th Earl of Angus, and Queen Margaret Tudor, daughter of King Henry VII of England and widow of King James IV of Scotland.

== Early life ==
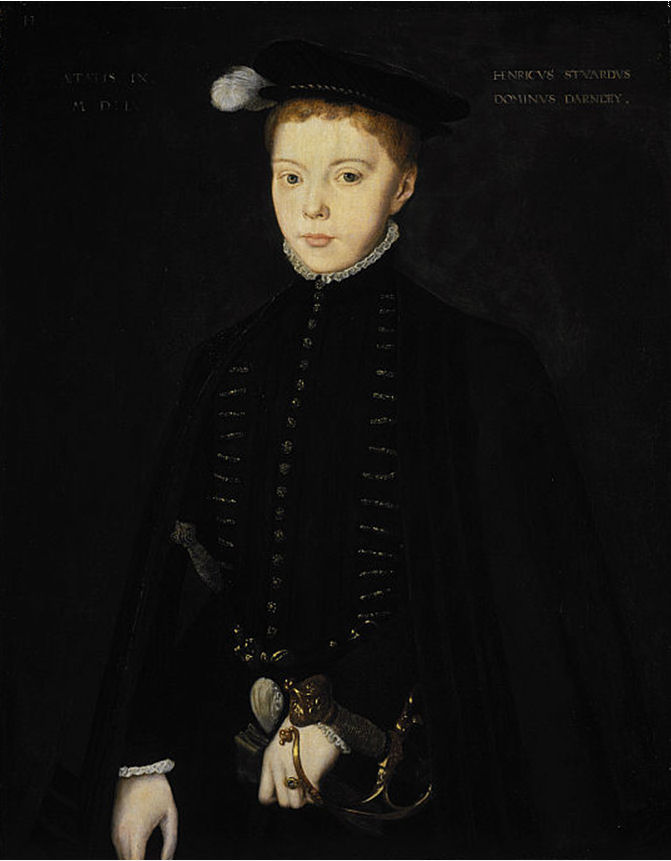
Lord Darnley aged about nine, by Hans Eworth. Scottish National Portrait Gallery, Edinburgh.

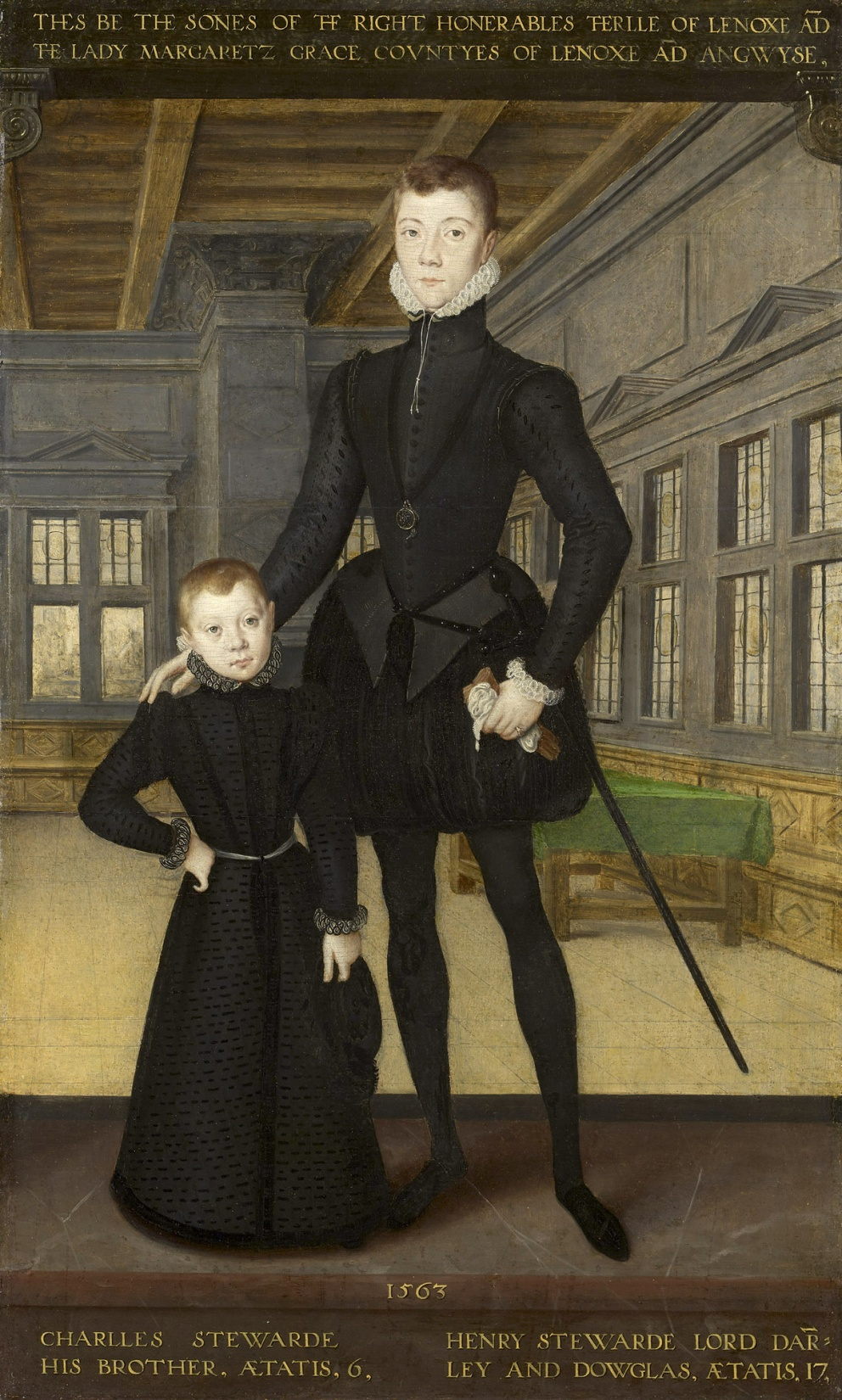
An oil on panel painting from 1563 by Hans Eworth of Henry Stuart, Lord Darnley, and his brother Charles Stuart in a grand interior based on a print by Hans Vredeman de Vries in Scenographiae, sive, Perspectivae.

Henry Stuart, Lord Darnley was born at Temple Newsam, Leeds, in the West Riding of Yorkshire, England, in 1546. Henry was initially believed to be born on 5 December 1545, but more recent research suggests he was born in 1546, as his mother had given birth in late February 1545. In a letter from March 1566, his age was given as nineteen.

In 1545, his father, Matthew Stewart, 4th Earl of Lennox, was found guilty of treason in Scotland for siding with the English in the War of the Rough Wooing, in opposing Mary of Guise and Regent Arran. The family's Scottish estates were forfeited and his father went into exile in England for 22 years, returning to Scotland in 1564. The Countess of Lennox Margaret Douglas, his mother, had left Scotland in 1528.

The Scottish scholar John Elder was among his tutors. Elder advocated Anglo-Scottish union through the marriage of Mary, Queen of Scots, and Edward, Prince of Wales. His advice to Henry VIII in 1543, was termed the Advice of a Redshank. Another schoolmaster to the young heir was Arthur Lallart, who would later be interrogated in London for having gone to Scotland in 1562.

Henry was considered strong, athletic, skilled in horsemanship and weaponry, and passionate about hunting and hawking. His youthful character is captured somewhat in a letter of March 1554 to Mary I of England from Temple Newsam, where he writes about making a map, the Utopia Nova, and his wish that "every haire in my heade for to be a wourthy souldiour". In Scotland, he was delighted with an English Water Spaniel, a gift from the courtier James Melville of Halhill.

== Succession crisis ==
There was a political dilemma in England arising from the dynastic ambition of the Lennoxes. Darnley's father Matthew Stewart, 4th Earl of Lennox, was third in line to the Scottish throne, and his wife Margaret Douglas, Countess of Lennox, was a niece of Henry VIII, making her a potential successor to the English throne if Elizabeth should die. As Roman Catholics, they posed a threat to English Protestants. Although Elizabeth was bright, witty, and well-educated for her position, as a woman she had to prove herself. As she was a Protestant, many Roman Catholics would have liked to see the Catholic Mary, Queen of Scots, take the throne. They regarded Elizabeth as illegitimate, her parents' marriage not having been recognised by the Catholic Church. As a male descended from Henry VII, Darnley was also a contender for the English throne—these interrelationships made for complex intrigues, spying, strategising, and manoeuvering for power at the various courts.

When Henry II of France died in July 1559, Lennox's brother John, 5th Sieur d'Aubigny, was elevated in the French court as a relative of the new French queen, Mary, already Queen of Scots. Aubigny arranged for Darnley to be dispatched to the French court to congratulate Mary and Francis II of France on Francis's accession and seek restoration for Lennox. Mary did not restore Lennox to his Scottish earldom. Still, she did give 1,000 crowns to Darnley and invited him to her coronation. Lennox planned to appeal directly to the Queen of Scots via her ambassador, over the heads of Elizabeth and the Guise. The mission of Lennox's agent, one Nesbit, appears to have been a desperate one; not only was Lennox willing to hand over Darnley and his brother Charles as hostages for his restoration, but he supplied pedigrees of Darnley, indicating his right to the inheritance of England and Scotland and the houses of Hamilton and Douglas. Aubigny was also later accused of supporting Mary's title to the throne of England and hinting that even his nephew had a stronger claim than Elizabeth.

Lennox set Nesbit to watch Mary, Darnley, and Darnley's tutor, John Elder. In 1559 Nicholas Throckmorton, the English ambassador in Paris, warned Elizabeth that Elder was "as dangerous for the matters of England as any he knew." Lord Paget in March 1560, wrote of the 'well founded' fear that Catholics would raise Darnley to the throne on Elizabeth's death.

Francis Yaxley was a Catholic spy discovered in 1562 whose activities led to the arrest of the Lennox family. He had been a Clerk of the Signet and from 1549 was employed by William Cecil travelling in France. Yaxley was employed by the Countess of Lennox. He placed Mabel Fortescue and other ladies as servants in the Lennox household at Settrington in November 1560. His interrogation at the Tower of London in February 1562 revealed that he had obtained intelligence about the English Court from the Spanish ambassador, and the ambassador had entrusted him and Hugh Allen with messages and tokens for the Lennoxes and Darnley. Yaxley admitted that his missions were intended to arrange the marriage of the Queen of Scots with Darnley, that Darnley's religion guaranteed him greater success in his suit than the Earl of Arran, and that the countess had many friends in the north. Although the Lennox threat never died out, Elizabeth did not convict the family of treason in 1562 after their arrest, nor did she encourage efforts to annul the countess's claim to her throne. Perhaps Elizabeth feared that these investigations could also be directed at herself, or her inaction was intended to ensure the monarchy's survival by not reducing the number of potential heirs. The Lennox family was released in February 1563. Within a few months, Darnley and his mother were conspicuous by their presence at Court and the favour they received there, although Elizabeth would not accommodate the earl at Court.

Sarah Macauley notes three outcomes of the court's decision in the Lennox trial:

"Their elevation at Court was, as it turned out in 1563, a useful complication in the succession issue. First, it presented a public statement that the preferences of Parliament (the claim of Catherine Grey in the succession crisis) could not dictate her own policy. Secondly, favouring the Lennoxes could serve as some kind of appeasement of the English Roman Catholics, who, like the Spanish ambassador, might foresee Elizabeth naming Darnley as her successor ... Such speculation would also distract them from favouring the more alarming claim of the Queen of Scots ... Thirdly, and most significantly, the elevation of the Lennoxes presented an obstacle between the Queen of Scots and the English throne. Thus was Darnley's uniquely 'British' inheritance put to use at last ... The subsequent release of Darnley into Scotland and the restoration of his father at the Scottish Court were part of this policy: the political disaster of the Darnley marriage as yet unforeseen."

In September 1564, the Scottish Parliament restored Matthew Stewart's rights and titles as Earl of Lennox, and listened to a lengthy speech from the Queen's secretary William Maitland, who offered;

"[I]t may be affirmid Scotland in na manis age that presentlie levis wes in gritter tranquillitie." (It may be affirmed Scotland in no man's age that presently lives was in greater tranquility.)

== Marriage to Mary, Queen of Scots ==
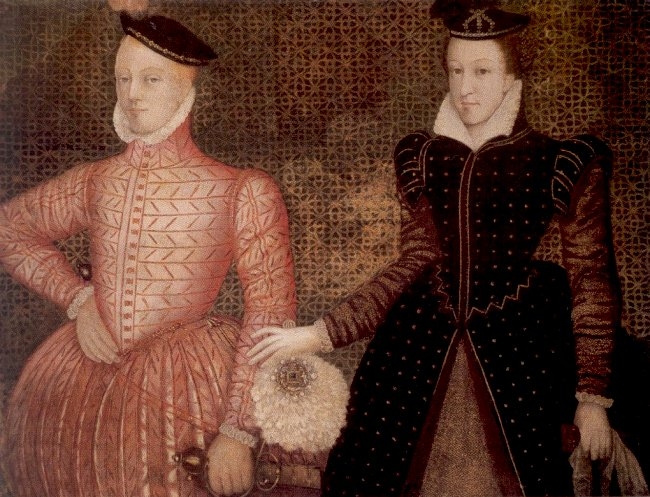
Darnley and Mary, Queen of Scots (painting c. 1565, now at Hardwick Hall in Derbyshire).

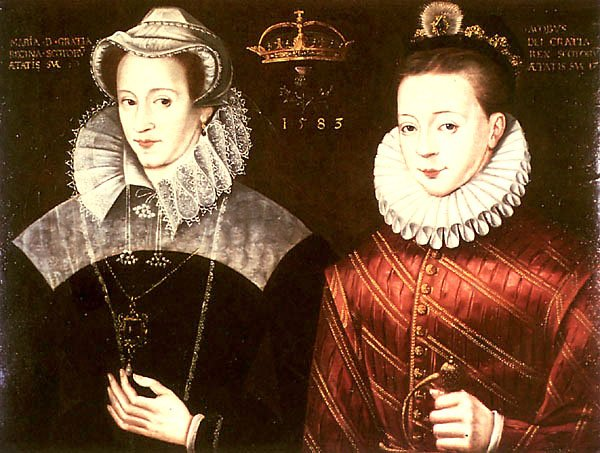
James VI and I (right) depicted aged 17 beside his mother Mary (left), 1583. In reality, they were separated when he was still a baby.

On 3 February 1565, Darnley left London; by 12 February, he was in Edinburgh. On 17 February, he presented himself to Mary at Wemyss Castle in Fife. Mary and Darnley had known each other since 1560, when his parents sent him to France to present themselves to Mary and offer their respects and condolences on the death of her first husband, Francis II. James Melville of Halhill reported that "Her Majesty took well with him, and said that he was the lustiest and best proportioned long man that she had seen." Mary immediately fell in love with the “long lad” as she initially called Darnley. —Elizabeth I mentioned in one of her writings that he was over six feet tall or about 1.80 m—. After a brief visit to his father at Dunkeld, Darnley returned with Mary and the court to Holyrood on 24 February. The next day, he heard John Knox preach, and he danced a galliard with Mary at night. He was constantly in Mary's company from then on.

Darnley was his wife's half-first cousin through two different marriages of their grandmother, Margaret Tudor, putting Mary and Darnley high in the line of succession for the English throne. Darnley was also a descendant of a daughter of James II of Scotland, and so also in line for the throne of Scotland.

As a preliminary to the marriage, Darnley was made a knight, Lord of Ardmanoch and Earl of Ross at Stirling Castle on 15 May 1565. An entourage of 15 men were made knights, including one of Mary's half brothers, Robert Stewart of Strathdon, Robert Drummond of Carnock, James Stewart of Doune Castle, and William Murray of Tullibardine. In England, a concerned Privy council debated the perils of the intended marriage on 4 June. One of their resolutions was to relax the displeasure shown to Lady Catherine Grey, another rival to Mary Stuart for the English throne and at that time with better rights to the throne than the Scottish monarch. Mary sent William Maitland of Lethington to London to inform Elizabeth of her marriage plan, and Nicholas Throckmorton was sent to Edinburgh to convey her "miscontentment". Elizabeth suggested that one of her favorite courtiers, Robert Dudley, 1st Earl of Leicester should marry Mary, but Leicester, whose distinguished reputation at the Elizabethan court had been tarnished by the death, under suspicious circumstances, of his first wife, Amy Robsart, in September 1560, refused to marry Mary, and instead worked in the interest of Darnley. As it became clear that Mary intended to marry Darnley, Elizabeth regretted allowing him and his father to travel to Scotland, and on 18 June she requested their return.

On 22 July, Darnley was made Duke of Albany in Holyrood Abbey, and the banns of marriage were called in the parish of Canongate. A proclamation was made at the Cross of Edinburgh on 28 July 1565 that government would be in the joint names of the king and queen of Scots, thus making Darnley king and giving him equality with and precedence over Mary. This was confirmed in the circulation of a silver ryal in the names of Henry and Mary.

On 29 July 1565, the marriage took place by Roman Catholic rites in Mary's private chapel at Holyrood, but Darnley (whose religious beliefs were unfixed – he was raised as a Catholic, but was later influenced by Protestantism) refused to accompany Mary to the nuptial Mass after the wedding. The English diplomat Thomas Randolph reported that Darnley did not attend the Mass but continued to attend services at St. Giles afterwards. John Knox wrote that Darnley went to his pastime (hunting with a Hawk) after the wedding while Mary went to the Mass. He said the dancing and banqueting went on for three or four days. Because the couple were first cousins, a papal dispensation was needed for the marriage, which was initially celebrated without the dispensation because the Holy See delayed issuing it. Rome issued the dispensation on September 25, thus validating the marriage between Mary and Darnley.

The marriage enraged Elizabeth because she considered Darnley, who was born and raised in England, to be her subject and had married without her permission. The marriage also posed a serious threat to Elizabeth because both Darnley and Mary had claims to the English throne as descendants of Henry VII, the first monarch of the reigning House of Tudor, and the English Catholics considered Mary to be the rightful heir to the throne, rather than Elizabeth who was Protestant. Furthermore, any son they might have would be a clear claimant to the throne of England.

In response to Henry's marriage, Elizabeth sent a diplomat John Tamworth to present her grievances to Mary. When Mary did not provide a suitable response, Elizabeth raged against Darnley's family, ordering the imprisonment of her first cousin and Darnley's mother, Lady Margaret, in the Tower of London. Margaret remained imprisoned in the Tower until she was freed shortly after her son's murder.

The marriage between Mary and the son of Scotland's premier Catholic nobleman alarmed the Protestant nobility, precipitating the Queen's half-brother, James Stewart, 1st Earl of Moray, along with the earls of Argyll, Glencairn, and Rothes to take up arms against Mary. Protestant noblemen were worried that the marriage would mean Scotland would take a turn towards Catholicism. The rebellion, known as the Chaseabout Raid, was soon defeated by the royal forces, and Moray was forced to escape to England, where he sought Elizabeth's asylum.

== Estrangement ==
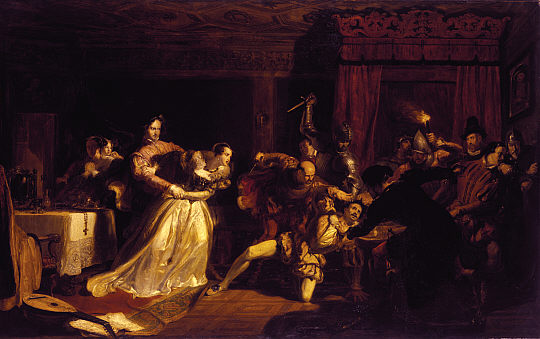
The Murder of David Rizzio by William Allan, 1833

Soon after Mary married Darnley, she became aware of his vain, arrogant, and unreliable qualities, which threatened the state's well-being. Darnley was unpopular with the other nobles and had a violent streak, aggravated by his drinking. Mary refused to grant Darnley the Crown Matrimonial, which would have made him the successor to the throne if she died childless. By August 1565, less than a month after the marriage, William Cecil heard that Darnley's insolence had driven Lennox from the Scottish court. On 28 August 1565, a pair of diplomatic letters were sent from the Scottish court to the King of Denmark, one signed by Mary, the other by Darnley. This seems to have been an effort to confirm his royal status. Mary soon became pregnant.

As a token of friendship, Charles IX of France sent an ambassador, Nicolas d'Angennes, seigneur de Rambouillet, to invest Darnley in the Order of Saint Michael in February 1566. Mary, Darnley, and her private secretary David Rizzio, took part in a costly masque with seven other dancers in rich attire to welcome Rambouillet and celebrate Darnley's investiture. His costume for the ceremony in the chapel of Holyroodhouse, of satin guarded with black velvet and satin, sewn with aglets of gold, was given to a French herald as a perquisite.

David Rizzio was stabbed 57 times on 9 March 1566 by Darnley and his confederates, Protestant Scottish nobles, in the presence of the queen, who was six months pregnant. According to English diplomats Thomas Randolph and the Earl of Bedford, the murder of Rizzio (who was rumoured to be the father of Mary's unborn child) was part of Darnley's bid to force Mary to cede the Crown Matrimonial. Darnley also bargained with his allies to advance his claim to the Crown Matrimonial in the Parliament of Scotland in return for restoring their lands and titles.

When the Spanish Ambassador in Paris heard this news, the headlines were that Darnley "had murdered his wife, admitted the exiled heretics, and seized the kingdom." However, on 20 March, Darnley posted a declaration denying all knowledge of or complicity in the Rizzio murder. Mary no longer trusted her husband, and he was disgraced by the kingdom. On 27 March, the Earl of Morton and Lord Ruthven, who were both present at Rizzio's murder and had fled to England, wrote to Cecil claiming that Darnley had initiated the murder plot and recruited them, because of his "heich quarrel" and "deadly hatred" of Rizzio. In May 1566, Darnley wrote to Catherine de' Medici to thank her for letters brought by Michel de Castelnau, taking the opportunity to insist he was innocent of the "horrible crime".

== Birth of son ==
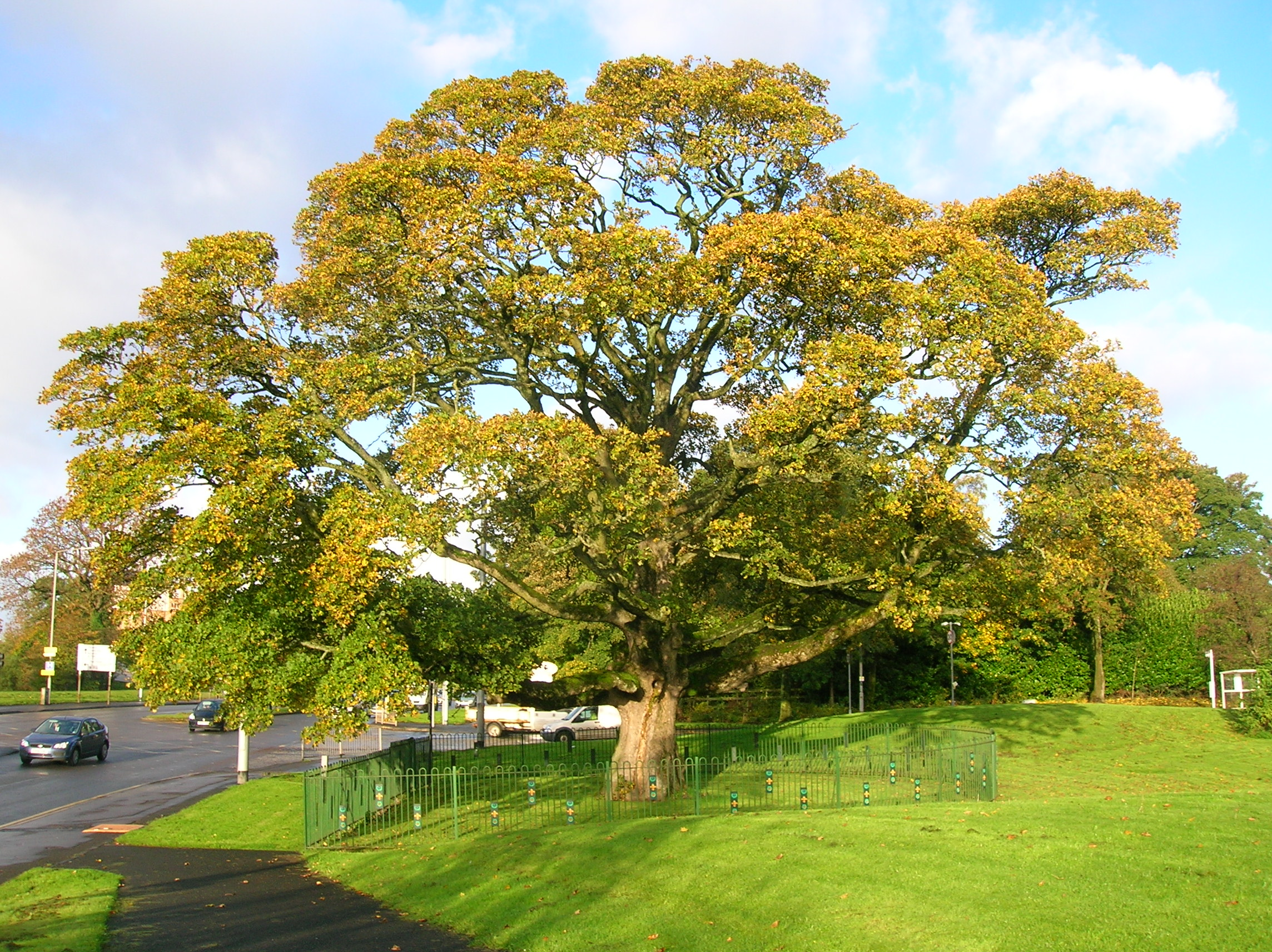
Mary is said to have nursed the smallpox-stricken Darnley under this sycamore tree at home at Darnley, now a suburb of Glasgow.

Mary and Darnley's son James (the future King James VI of Scotland and I of England) was born on 19 June 1566 at Edinburgh Castle.

Following the birth of James, the succession was more secure, but Darnley and Mary's marriage continued to struggle, despite a hunting trip together to Cramalt Tower in the Ettrick Forest in August 1566. Darnley alienated many who would otherwise have been his supporters through his erratic behaviour. His insistence that he be awarded the Crown Matrimonial was still a source of marital frustration.

Their son was baptised Charles James on 17 December 1566 in a Catholic ceremony held at Stirling Castle. His godparents were Charles IX of France, Elizabeth I of England and Emmanuel Philibert, Duke of Savoy. Mary refused to let the Archbishop of St Andrews, whom she referred to as "a pocky priest", spit in the child's mouth, as was then the custom. In the entertainment, devised by Frenchman Bastian Pagez, men danced dressed as satyrs and sporting tails; the English guests took offence, thinking the satyrs "done against them". The French ambassador described how Darnley was lodged in the castle but stayed in his rooms, and sensing he was out of favour, the ambassador refused to meet with him.

== Death ==
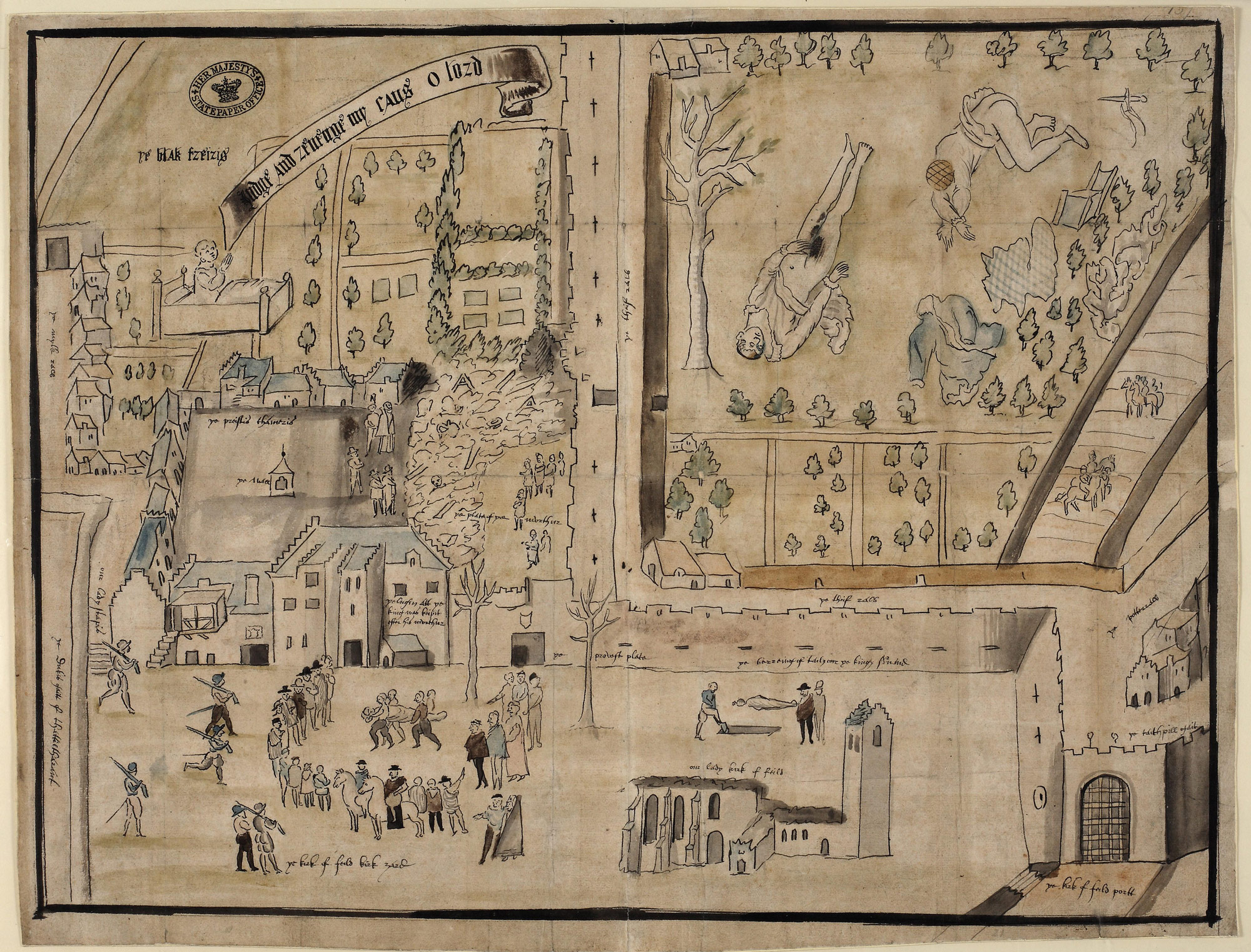
1567 drawing of Kirk o' Field after the murder of Darnley, drawn for William Cecil shortly after the murder.

Darnley was murdered eight months after James's birth. On the night of 9/10 February 1567, his body and that of his valet were discovered in the orchard of Kirk o' Field, in Edinburgh, where they had been staying. During the weeks leading up to his death, Darnley was recovering from a bout of smallpox (or, it has been speculated, syphilis). He was described as having deformed pocks upon his face and body. He stayed with his family in Glasgow until Mary brought him to recuperate at Old Provost's lodging at Kirk o' Field, a two-storey house within the church quadrangle, a short walk from Holyrood, to incorporate him into the court again. Darnley stayed at Kirk o' Field while Mary attended the wedding of Bastian Pagez, one of her closest servants, at Holyrood.

Around 2:00 a.m. on the night of 9/10 February 1567, while Mary was away, two explosions rocked the foundation of Kirk o' Field. These explosions were later attributed to two barrels of gunpowder that had been placed in the small room under Darnley's sleeping quarters. Darnley's body and the body of his valet, William Taylor, were found outside, surrounded by a cloak, a dagger, a chair, and a coat. Darnley was dressed only in his nightshirt, suggesting he had hurriedly fled from his bedchamber. Darnley was smothered. There were no visible marks of strangulation or violence on the body. A post-mortem revealed internal injuries thought to have been caused by the explosion. John Knox claimed that the surgeons who examined the body were lying and that Darnley had been strangled, but all the sources agreed there were no marks on the body and there was no reason for the surgeons to lie as Darnley was murdered either way.

== Aftermath ==
Suspicion quickly fell on James Hepburn, 4th Earl of Bothwell, and his supporters, notably Archibald Douglas, Parson of Douglas, whose shoes were found at the scene, and on Mary herself. Bothwell had long been suspected of having designs on the throne, and his close relationship with the queen gave rise to rumours they were sexually intimate. This was viewed as a motive for Bothwell to have Darnley murdered, with help from some of the nobility and seemingly with royal approval. Mary had been looking at options for removing Darnley and had discussed ideas at Craigmillar Castle in November 1566, though her ideas were for divorce. The problem was the risk of making her son illegitimate.

Soon after Darnley's death, Bothwell and Mary left Edinburgh together. There are two points of view about the circumstances: in the first, Bothwell kidnapped the queen, took her to Dunbar Castle, and raped her. In the second, Mary was a willing participant in the kidnapping, and the story of rape was a fabrication, so her honour and reputation were not ruined by her marriage to a man widely suspected of murder. Mary later miscarried twins by Bothwell while a prisoner at Lochleven Castle.

A soldier under the pay of Bothwell, Captain William Blackadder of the Clan Blackadder, was one of the first non-participants to happen upon the scene and, for that reason, was treated as a suspect. He was convicted and executed by being hanged, drawn and quartered before each of his limbs was nailed to the gates of a different Scottish town.

Bothwell was put on trial in Edinburgh and found not guilty. Suspicions that Mary colluded with conspirators in her husband's death or that she took no action to prevent his death led to the loss of her supporters and the loss of the Scottish crown. Bothwell escaped to Shetland and Norway. Her enemies captured Mary at the battle of Carberry Hill. In 1568, Mary's involvement in the murder was discussed in England in conferences at York and Westminster, which ended with no definitive findings. The Casket letters were produced as evidence against her, alleged to have been written by Mary; they seemed to indicate her support for the killing. The letters were purportedly found by James Douglas, 4th Earl of Morton, in Edinburgh, in a silver box engraved with an "F" (for Francis II), along with other documents, including the Mary-Bothwell marriage certificate. Before Morton's execution in 1581, he admitted knowing the murder plot, and that Bothwell and Archibald Douglas were "chief actors" in Darnley's murder.

Mary fled to England but was kept in captivity there until she was implicated in the Babington Plot against Elizabeth, after which she was convicted of treason and executed.

== Burial and missing remains ==
Darnley was buried in the Royal Vault at Holyrood Abbey in 1567 alongside the bodies of several royals: King James II, Arthur, Duke of Rothesay, Madeleine of Valois, James, Duke of Rothesay, Arthur, Duke of Albany and King James V. In 1668, the vault was opened by mobs, and sometime later (between 1776 and 1778), the vault was raided, and the skull of Lord Darnley was stolen.

In 1928, a paper was published by Karl Pearson, detailing his vast research into the skull of Lord Darnley. In his paper, Pearson discussed the possibility of Darnley's skull residing in the Royal College of Surgeons' museum. In 2016, at the request of the University of Edinburgh, research was undertaken to identify whether a skull once held in the university's collection (until destroyed in the Blitz) could be Darnley's stolen remains. The Royal College of Surgeons' skull and detailed pictures and measurements from 1928 of the destroyed Edinburgh skull were examined and compared to portraits of Darnley by Emma Price at the University of Dundee. The conclusion was that the Edinburgh skull could not be Darnley's, but the Royal College of Surgeons' one was a good match. A historical facial reconstruction was then produced.

== Sexuality ==
Darnley's sexuality has been subject to debate. While at the Court of Elizabeth I, he was described as "a great cock chick", and Thomas Randolph (Elizabeth I's ambassador to Scotland) in a later despatch wrote that Darnley and Rizzio "would lie sometimes in one bed together". A sexual relationship between Darnley and Rizzio was depicted in both the 1971 film Mary, Queen of Scots and the 2018 film Mary Queen of Scots.

== Honours ==
- February 1565: Order of Saint Michael, awarded by King Charles IX of France.

== Poetry and the Bannatyne Manuscript ==
Darnley was the author of 'Darnley's Ballet', 'Gife langour makis men licht', and potentially 'Quhair luve is kendlit confortless' [attribution uncertain] printed in the Bannatyne Manuscript (1570 ca.).

== Bibliography ==
- Darnley: A Life of Henry Stuart, Lord Darnley, Consort of Mary Queen of Scots by Caroline Bingham
- Fraser, Antonia (1994) [1969]. Mary Queen of Scots. London: Weidenfeld and Nicolson. ISBN 978-0-297-17773-9.
- Macauley, Sarah, 'Lennox Crisis', in Northern History vol.41.2 (2004) subscription or ATHENS login required.
- Greig, Elaine Finnie (2004). "Stewart, Henry, duke of Albany [Lord Darnley] (1545/6–1567)". Oxford Dictionary of National Biography. Vol. 1. Oxford University Press. doi:10.1093/ref:odnb/26473. (subscription, Wikipedia Library access or UK public library membership required)
- Guy, John (2004). "My Heart Is My Own": The Life of Mary Queen of Scots. London: Fourth Estate. ISBN 978-1-84115-753-5.
- Ives, Eric (12 October 2009). Lady Jane Grey: A Tudor Mystery. Malden, Mass: Wiley-Blackwell. ISBN 978-1-4051-9413-6.
- Weir, Alison (2008) [2003]. Mary, Queen of Scots and the Murder of Lord Darnley. London: Random House. ISBN 978-0-09-952707-7.
- Wormald, Jenny (1988). Mary, Queen of Scots. London: George Philip. ISBN 978-0-540-01131-5.

Scottish royalty
Vacant Title last held by Francis II of France	King consort of Scots; 1565–1567	Vacant Title next held by James Hepburn, Duke of Orkney as consort
Peerage of Scotland
New creation	Duke of Albany; 4th creation Earl of Ross; 3rd creation 1565–1567	Succeeded by James Stuart
