= The Orphan (painting) =

1834 painting by William Allan

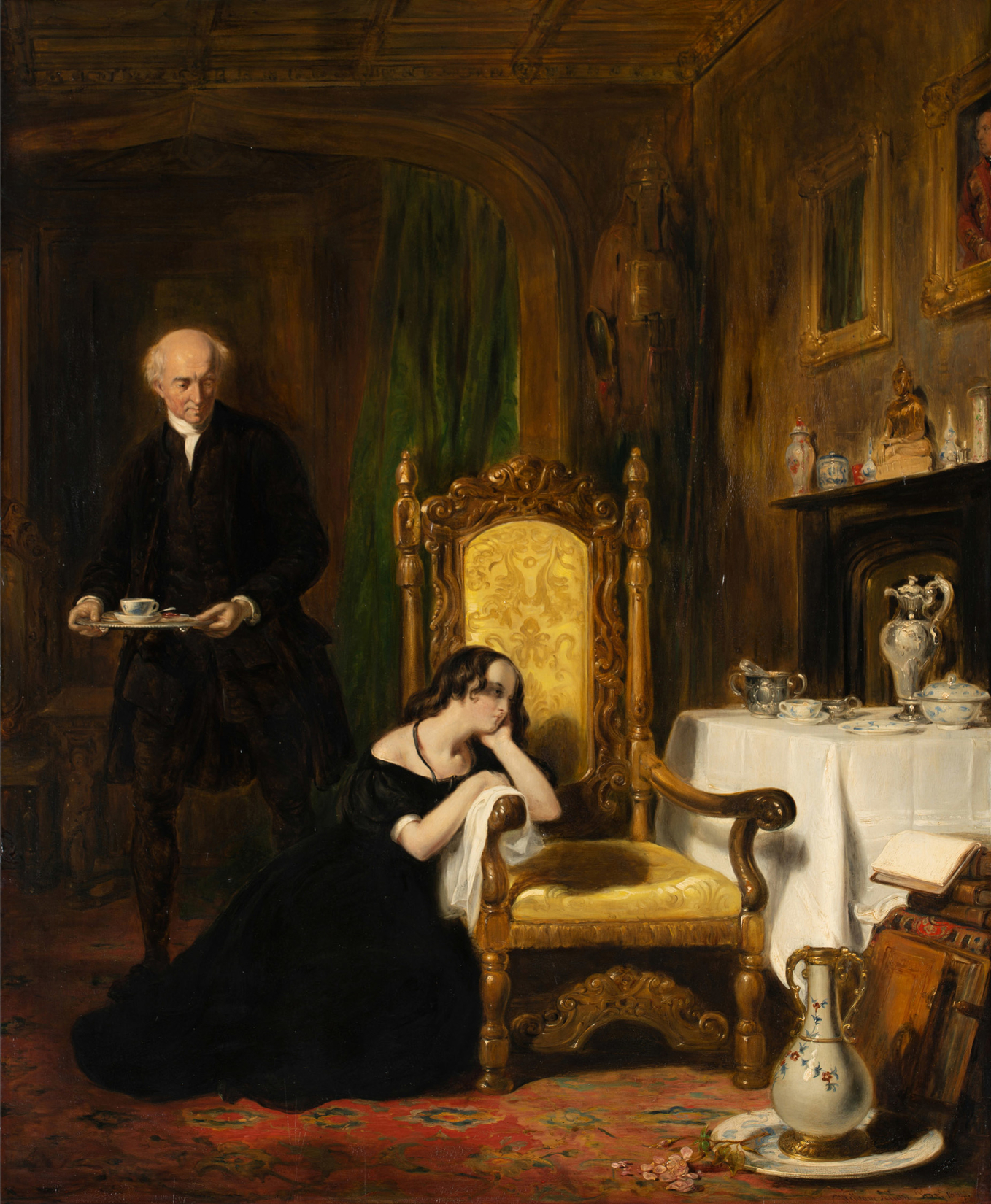
- Artist: William Allan
- Year: 1834
- Type: Oil on panel, genre painting
- Dimensions: 85.7 cm × 72.4 cm (33.7 in × 28.5 in)
- Location: Royal Collection

The Orphan is an oil on panel painting by the Scottish artist William Allan, from 1834. It is held at the Royal Collection. Allan produced it as a lament for the loss of his friend and supporter, the writer Sir Walter Scott, who had died in 1832.

== History and description ==
The scene takes place at the dining room of Abbotsford, the country house in southern Scotland. Scott's daughter Anne, dressed in black, leans mournfully against the writer's empty carved oak chair, with a thoughtful expression. An older man, meanwhile, arrives bringing a tray with a cup of tea.

When Allan had been struggling as an artist, Scott and David Wilkie had suggested he switch to painting scenes from Scottish history leading to his success. Allan also acted as the illustrator for Scott's Waverley novels.

It was exhibited at the Royal Academy's Summer Exhibition of 1834 and was likely acquired by William IV or his wife Queen Adelaide soon afterwards. In 1841 it was hanging in the Picture Gallery of Buckingham Palace. It remains in the Royal Collection.

== Bibliography ==
- Bury, Stephen (ed.) Benezit Dictionary of British Graphic Artists and Illustrators, Volume 1. OUP, 2012.
- Clarke, Deborah & Remington, Vanessa. Scottish Artists 1750–1900: From Caledonia to the Continent. Royal Collection Trust, 2015.
