= The Battle of Waterloo (Allan) =

Painting by William Allan

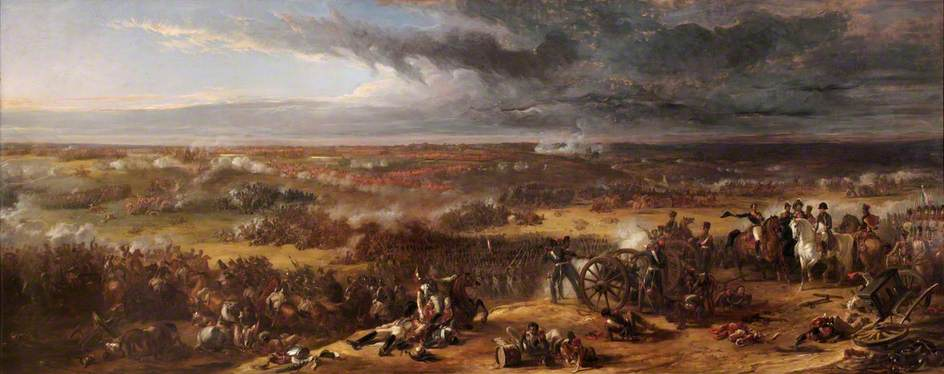
- Artist: William Allan
- Year: 1843
- Medium: Oil on panel
- Dimensions: 118 cm × 310 cm (46 in × 120 in)
- Location: Apsley House, London

The Battle of Waterloo is a painting of 1843 by the British artist William Allan.

== History and description ==
It depicts a panoramic view of the Battle of Waterloo at the climatic moment of the fighting. An attack of the massed ranks of the imperial Guard led in person by Marshal Ney launched towards the Allied infantry on the ridge under the overall command of the Duke of Wellington, is being assaulted by Maitland's Brigade of Guards and another brigade under Frederick Adam. Wellington is shown with his staff by a Royal Artillery battery, ordering a general advance of the Allied Army.

Allan had travelled extensively producing genre scenes from Russia and the Ottoman Empire, before building his reputation on history paintings, particularly scenes of Scottish history. The painting was displayed at the Royal Academy Exhibition of 1843 at the National Gallery in London. The picture was purchased by the Duke of Wellington for his London residence Apsley House, where it remains today.

== Bibliography ==
- Carlisle, Janice. Picturing Reform in Victorian Britain. Cambridge University Press, 2012.
- Clarke, Deborah & Remington, Vanessa. Scottish Artists 1750–1900: From Caledonia to the Continent. Royal Collection Trust, 2015.
- Jervis, Simon & Tomlin, Maurice. Apsley House, Wellington Museum. Victoria and Albert Museum, 1997.
- Muir, Rory. Wellington: Waterloo and the Fortunes of Peace 1814–1852. Yale University Press, 2015.
