= The Murder of David Rizzio =

1833 painting by William Allan

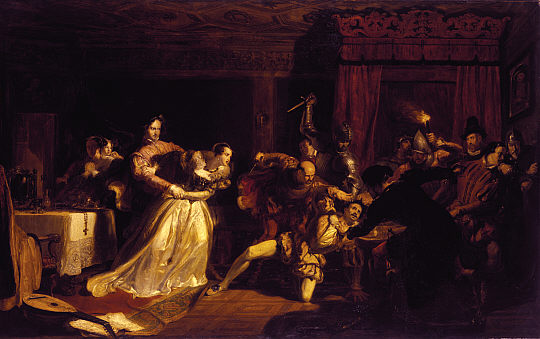
- Artist: William Allan
- Year: 1833
- Type: Oil on canvas, history painting
- Dimensions: 102.5 cm × 163.6 cm (40.4 in × 64.4 in)
- Location: Scottish National Gallery; Edinburgh

The Murder of David Rizzio is an 1833 history painting by the Scottish artist William Allan. It portrays the 1566 assassination of the Italian courtier David Rizzio at Holyrood Palace during the reign of Mary, Queen of Scots. On the left side of the canvas Mary is shown being restrained by her husband Lord Darnley. The artist took great care to be historically accurate in his depictions of the various figures portrayed in the scene. It was exhibited at the Royal Academy's Summer Exhibition at Somerset House in London where it was major success. Today it is in the collection of the Scottish National Gallery, having been acquired in 1927.

== Bibliography ==
- Morrison, John. Painting the Nation: Identity and Nationalism in Scottish Painting, 1800-1920. Edinburgh University Press, 2003.
- Robson, Walter. Access to History: Crown, Parliament and People 1500-1750. Oxford University Press 1992.
- Tromans, Nicholas. David Wilkie: The People's Painter. Edinburgh University Press, 2007.
