= The Signing of the National Covenant in Greyfriars Kirkyard =

Oil painting by William Allan

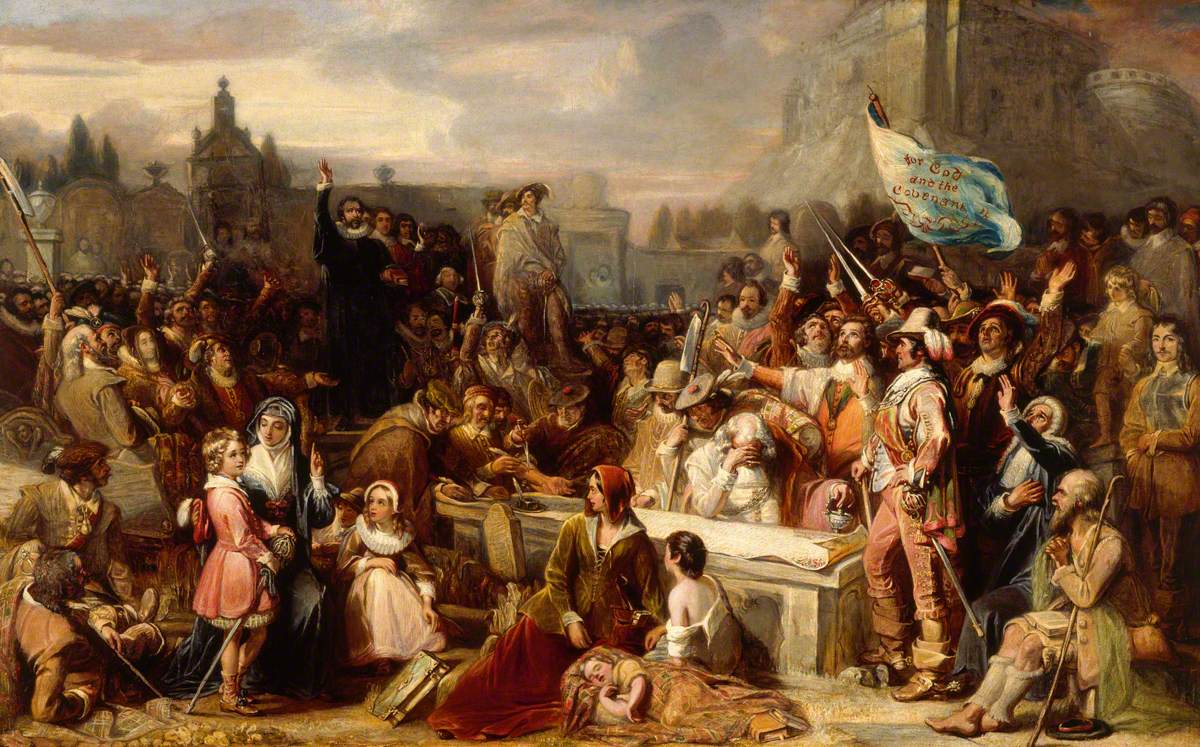
- Artist: Sir William Allan
- Year: 1838
- Medium: Oil on canvas
- Dimensions: 81.5 x 130.2 cm
- Location: City Art Centre, Edinburgh

The Signing of the National Covenant in Greyfriars Kirkyard is an oil painting by William Allan. It was painted in 1838 when he was the President of the Royal Scottish Academy and Master of the Trustee's Academy. It was bought from the Friends of the Kirk of Greyfriars in 1991 with Jean F. Watson Bequest Fund and the grant-in-aid from the National Fund for Acquisitions.

== Background ==
The Scottish nobility and clergy sign the National Covenant in 1638, defying King Charles I of England of the Stuart Dynasty. The Scottish Kirks fiercely resented the King's interference in their religious matters as a result of the King's adoption of the Book of Common Prayer and Bishops into Government. They signed this petition in support of their rights and sense of national identity, acknowledging only God as the head of the Kirk. Thousands of Scots from all around the nation signed this agreement, which proposed a free Scottish Parliament and a free General Assembly. It opposed King Charles I's and William Laud's efforts to unite the disparate churches of England and Scotland by requiring the Scottish church to follow English liturgical customs and church administration. The National Covenant was distributed to churches all over the nation, and within a short period of time, over 300,000 Scots had signed it.

== Description ==
This oil painting depicts the crucial point in the Scottish history of Signing the National Covenant in Greyfriars Kirkyard, Edinburgh. The painting is set in Greyfriars Kirkyard with Edinburgh Castle and the city in the backdrop. This painting is now on display in City Art Centre, Edinburgh.
