= Bashkiria =

Bashkiria may refer to:

- Republic of Bashkortostan, a federal subject of Russia
- Bashkir Autonomous Soviet Socialist Republic (1919–1992), an administrative division of the Russian SFSR, Soviet Union
- Bashkiria (brachiopod), a genus of Brachiopoda; see List of brachiopod genera
- Badzhgard or Bashkiria, a historical and geographical area in Volga and Ural
- Bashkiria (1917–1919), an autonomous and de facto independent state which existed during the Russian Civil War

== See also ==
- Bashkir (disambiguation)
