= The Pearl Saga =

Incomplete series of novels by Eric Van Lustbader

- First editions (UK)
- Author: Eric Van Lustbader
- Cover artist: Keith Parkinson
- Language: English
- Genre: Science fiction
- Publisher: Tor Books (US); HarperCollins (UK)
- Published: 2001-2004
- Media type: Print (hardcover)

The Pearl Saga is an incomplete series of science fiction / fantasy novels by Eric Van Lustbader. The series centers on Kundala, a planet conquered by the V'ornn, a race of aristocratic, militaristic humanoids; themselves ruled by the Gyrgon, a cabal of mysterious androgynous technomages. The main character is Riane, a prophesied redeemer known as the Dar Sala-at, born at both ends of the cosmos.

== Characters ==
- Annon Ashera - outcast V'ornn
- Riane - amnesiac girl
- Lady Giyan - lover of Annon's father
- Miina - creator Goddess
- Thigpen - a Rappa, a talking, six-limbed creature
- Eleana - woman loved by both Annon and Riane
- Kurgan, V'ornn rapist of Eleana, sire of her child
- Marethyn Stogggul, Kurgan's defiant sister, an artist who joins the Kundalan resistance
- Sornnn SaTrryn, chief trader and Marethyn's lover
- Krystren, a Sarakkon woman from the mysterious southern continent
- Rekkk Hacilar, former Pack-Commander, now Transcended (part Gyrgon)
- Nith Sahor, renegade Gyrgon
- Minnum, curator of the Museum of False Memory

== Kundala ==
Kundala is a planet with five moons and nine seas.

=== Five Sacred Dragons ===
The five dragons created Kundala under the direction of the Goddess Miia.

- Eshir - air / Forgiveness
- Gom - earth / Renewal
- Yig - fire / Power
- Seelin - water / Transformation
- Paow - wood / Vision

=== Daemons ===
The daemons constructed and shaped Kundala. When they finished, they did not want to leave and were banished to the Abyss, a sorcerous void.

- Pyphoros
- Horolaggia
- Myggorra
- Sepseriis
- Tzelos

== Cultures ==
=== Kundalan ===
Kundalan culture is based roughly around the worship of the Great Goddess Miina, creator of Kundala. Kundalan society was once patriarchal, but is currently matriarchal. Worship is conducted in Abbeys, by the Ramahan. Kundalans practice at least two different kinds of sorcery, Osoru and Kyofu.

They speak one common language, with two older languages - the Old Tongue and Venca, the language of sorcery - being less common. The Venca language has 777 letters, ten times that of the Old Tongue.

=== V'ornn ===
The V'ornn are a nomadic, space-faring race, ostensibly searching for a new homeworld. V'ornn culture is centered on castes. They do not (currently) worship anything. The Mesagggun previously worshiped the War God Enlil, now dead.

The Greater Castes

- Bashkir - Merchants
- Gyorgan - Technomages
- Genomatekks - Physicians

The Lesser Castes

- Khagggun - Warriors
- Mesagggun - Engineers
- Tuskugggun - Females (as artists, musicians, artificers, prostitutes(Looorm) )
- Deirus - Physicians (morticians and psychotherapists)

The V'ornn lack hair entirely and have pale yellow skin. V'ornns view all other species as soulless animals. Despite different origins, they can interbreed with Kundalans.

=== Druuge ===
A nomadic people that live in the Great Voorg, a desert. They speak Venca. Some aspects of Druuge cosmology parallels V'ornn mythology.

=== Sarakkon ===
Inhabitants of the radioactive Southern Continent. They worship an androgynous being, Abrasea.

=== Centophennni ===
The only race to have stood against the V'ornn, the one thing they fear. They inflicted a punishing defeat upon the V'ornn fleet at Hellespennn 250 years previously, in revenge for the V'ornn invasion of their world 300 years before that. Their weapons use a Goron particle beam.

== Items ==
The novels revolve around these items and the quest to find them.

- Ring of Five Dragons - Ring carved from red jade. Enables the opening of The Storehouse Door.
- The Pearl - Item formed during the creation of Kundala.
- The Veil of a Thousand Tears - Transformed outer shell of The Pearl.
- Nine Banestones

== Bibliography ==
#	Title	Author	Publisher	Date	Genre	Length	Alt. Title
1	The Ring of Five Dragons	Eric Van Lustbader	Voyager Books/Tor Books	2001	Science fiction	616 pp (first edition)	None
The Kundalans have long suffered under the rule of the V'ornns. The psyche of a fleeing V'ornn and a mysterious amnesiac girl named Riane are united to form the Dar Sala-at. Only her finding of the Ring of Five Dragons can avert a countdown to planetary doom.
2	The Veil of a Thousand Tears	Eric Van Lustbader	Voyager Books	2002	Science fiction/fantasy	630 pp (first edition)	None
Disaster has been averted by Riane's finding of the anachronistic Ring of Five Dragons, but the spell that created the Dar Sala-at also breached the Abyss, releasing the daemons imprisoned there aeons ago by the Goddess Miina, after they finished building Kundala. Only The Veil of a Thousand Tears can banish them.
3	The Cage of Nine Banestones	Eric Van Lustbader	Voyager Books	2003	Science fiction/fantasy	629 pp (first edition)	US title: Mistress of the Pearl
A group of evil sorcerers called Sauromicians seek to bind a dragon.

== Incompleteness ==
Van Lustbader has stated that, due to the popularity of the Bourne series, The Pearl Saga was put on hold. He says the series is expected to run to six or seven novels.
