= William Allan (painter) =

Scottish artist (1782–1850)

Sir William Allan
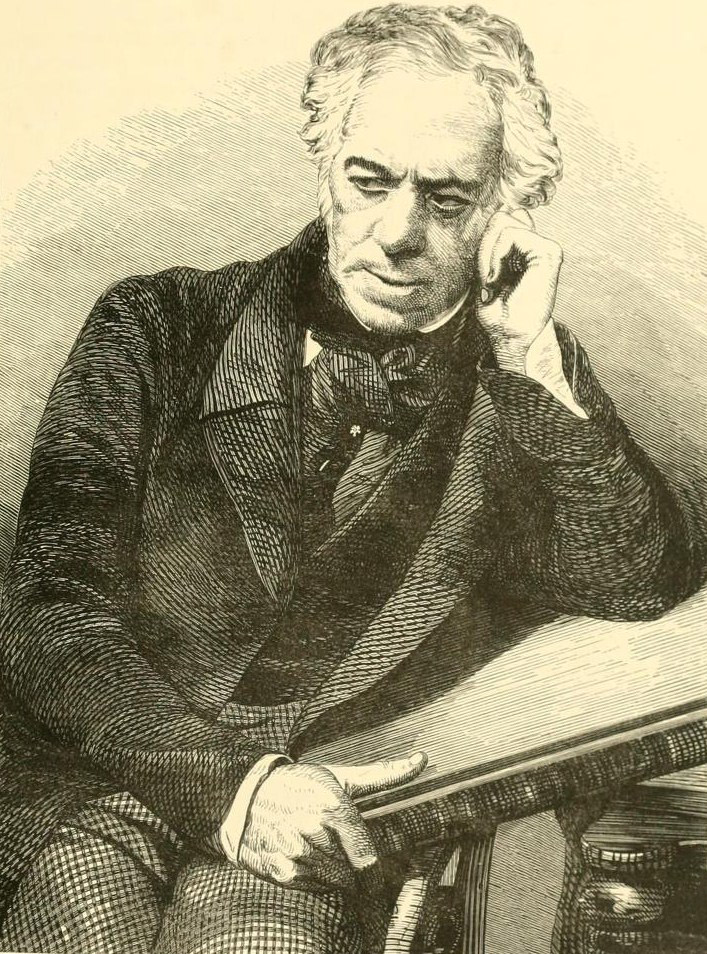
- Born: 1782; Edinburgh, Scotland
- Died: 23 February 1850 (aged 67–68); Edinburgh, Scotland
- Known for: Painting

Sir William Allan RA (1782 – 23 February 1850) was a Scottish historical painter known for his scenes of Russian life. He became president of the Royal Scottish Academy and was made a Royal Academician.

== Life and work ==
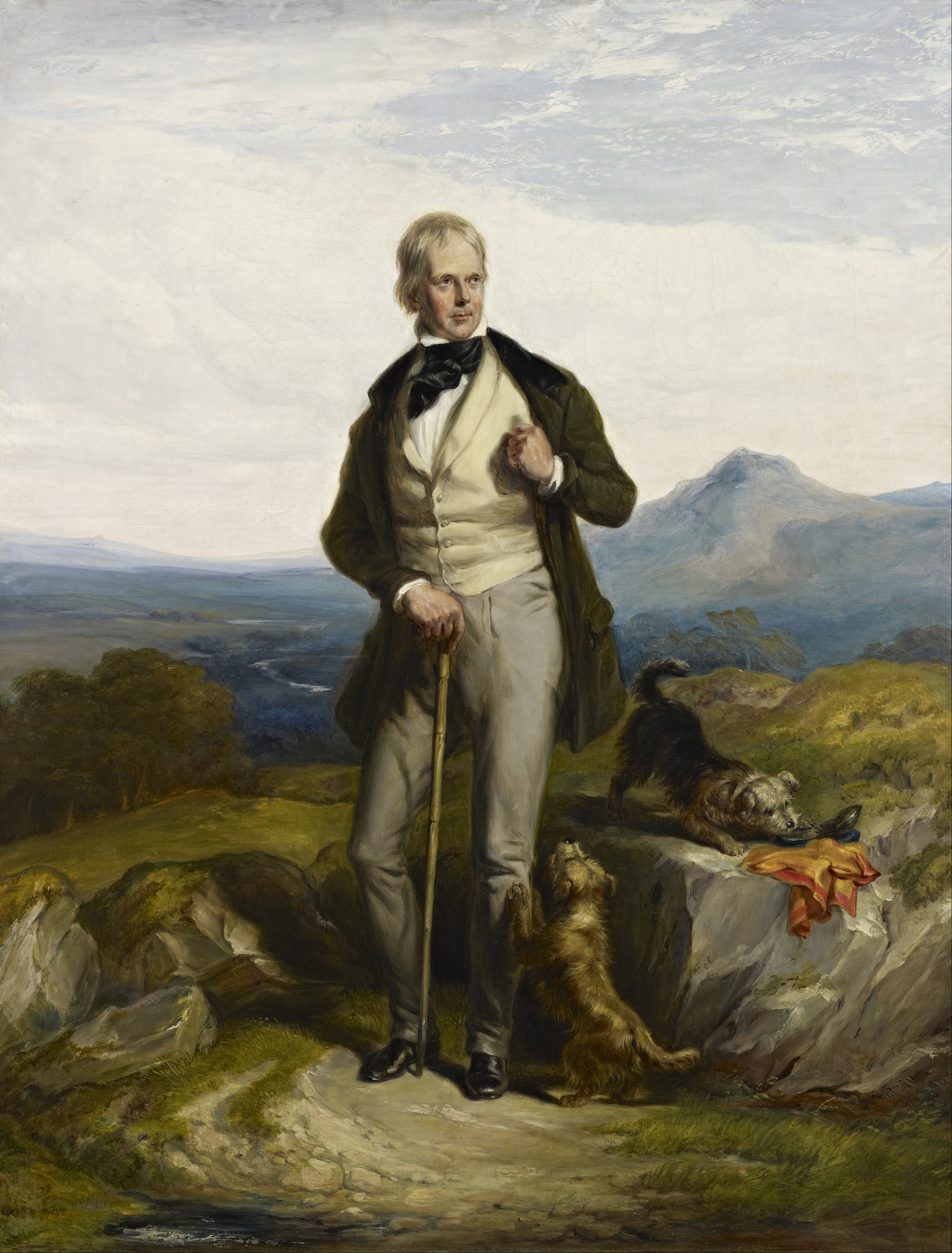
Sir Walter Scott, novelist and poet – painted by Sir William Allan

Allan was born in Edinburgh, the son of William Allan Snr., macer, an officer of the Court of Session. He was educated at the High School, Edinburgh, under William Nicol (1744?-1797), the companion of Robert Burns. Showing an aptitude for art, he was apprenticed to a coach-painter, and studied under John Graham at the Trustees' Academy, with David Wilkie, John Burnet, and Alexander George Fraser. Here Allan and Wilkie were placed at the same table, studied the same designs, and contracted a lifelong friendship.

After a few years he came to London, and entered the schools of the Royal Academy. His first exhibited picture was a Gipsy Boy with an Ass (1803), in the style of John Opie.

Not finding success in London, in 1805 he travelled, by ship, to Russia, but was wrecked at Memel, where he raised funds for the remaining journey by painting portraits of the Dutch consul and others. He then proceeded overland to St. Petersburg, passing through a great portion of the Russian army on its way to Austerlitz. At the Russian capital he found friends, including Sir Alexander Crichton, physician to the imperial family. Having learned Russian, he travelled in the interior of the country, and spent several years in Ukraine, making excursions to Turkey, Tartary, and elsewhere, studying the culture of Cossacks, Circassians, and Tartars, and collecting arms and armour. In 1809 his picture Russian Peasants keeping their Holiday was exhibited at the Royal Academy.

His wish to return home in 1812 had to be postponed due to the French invasion of Russia, many of the horrors of which he witnessed first-hand.

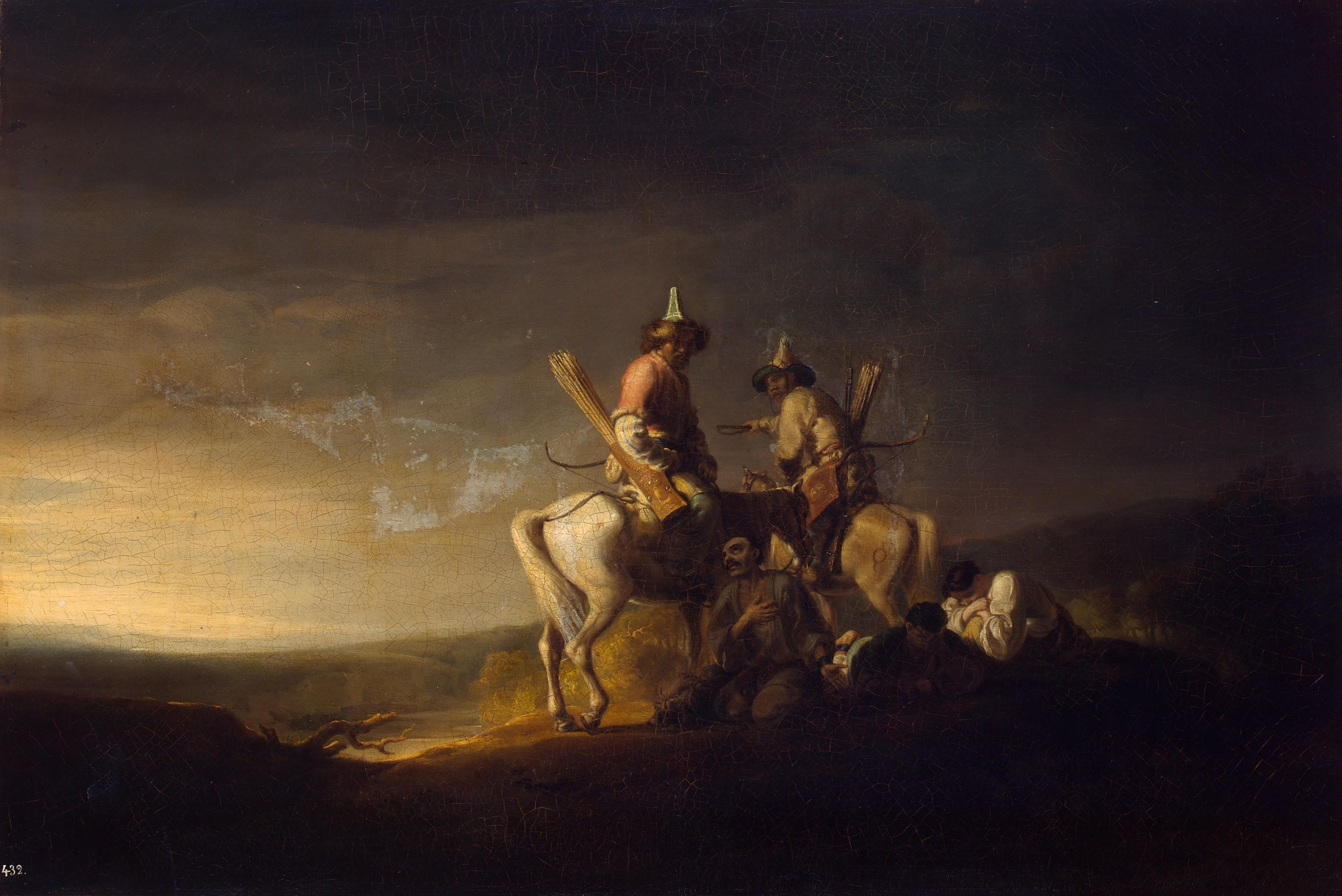
Bashkirs (1814, Hermitage)

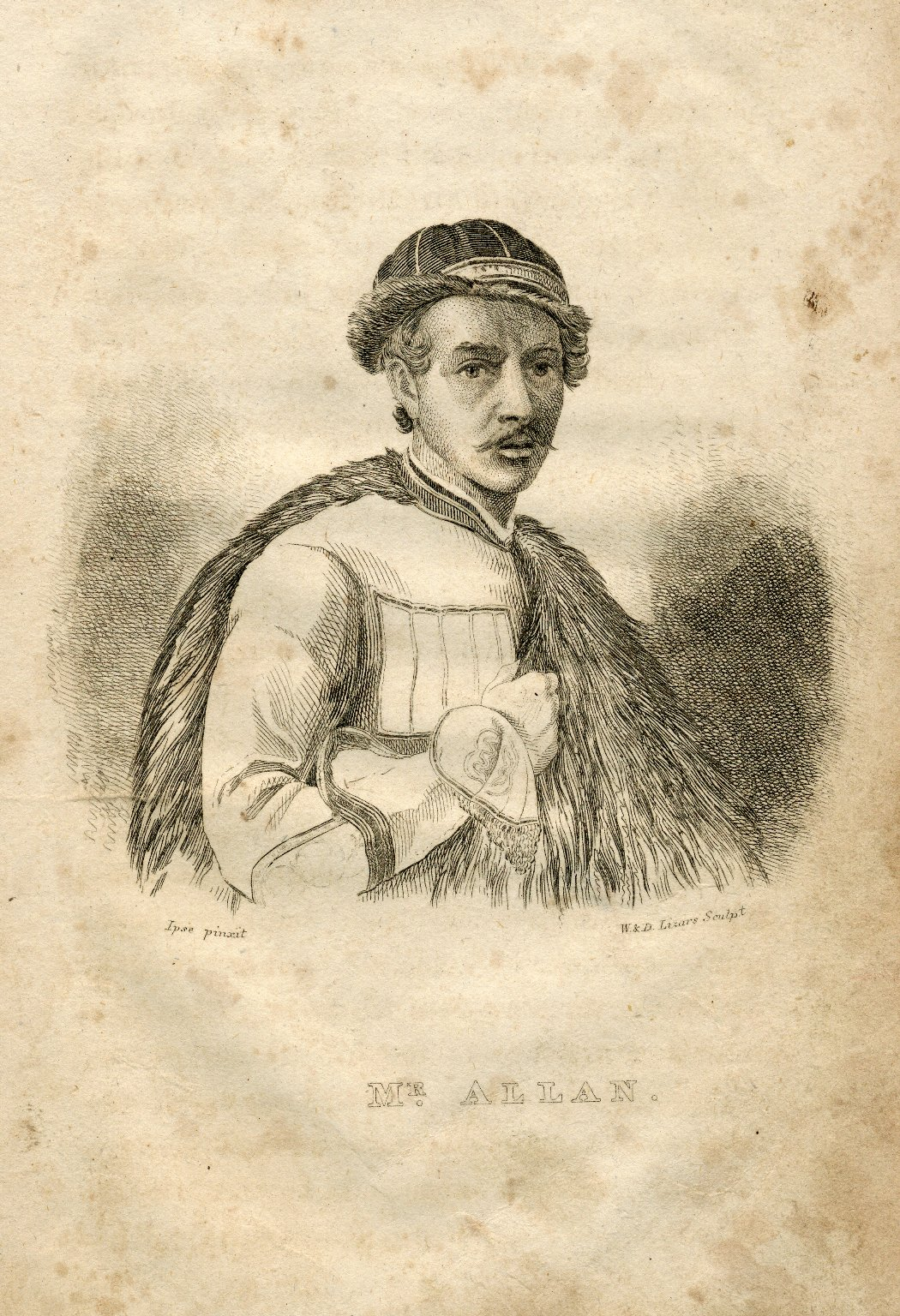
Self-portrait of Sir William Allan steel-engraved by W.H. Lizars. 1819.

Allan was able to return to Edinburgh in 1814, and, in 1815, his picture Circassian Captives attracted notice at the Royal Academy, though it did not find a purchaser. However, Sir Walter Scott, John Wilson (1785–1854) and his brother James (1795–1856), John Lockhart, and others, raised a lottery for it, with 100 subscribers at £10 10s. each, and the picture was won by Francis Wemyss-Charteris, 9th Earl of Wemyss. Allan remained in Edinburgh, and though his pictures (including Tartar Robbers dividing their Spoil) did not find purchasers amongst his countrymen, some of them were bought by the Grand Duke Nicholas when he visited Edinburgh, which resulted in a turn of fortune for the artist. Allan afterwards painted some scenes from Scottish history suggested by the novels of Sir Walter Scott, such as Death of Archbishop Sharpe and Knox admonishing Mary Queen of Scots (exhibited in 1823 and engraved by John Burnet). Also of note were Mary Queen of Scots signing her Abdication (1824) and Death of the Regent Murray (exhibited 1825), which was purchased by the Duke of Bedford for 800 guineas, and gained the artist his election as an associate of the Royal Academy.

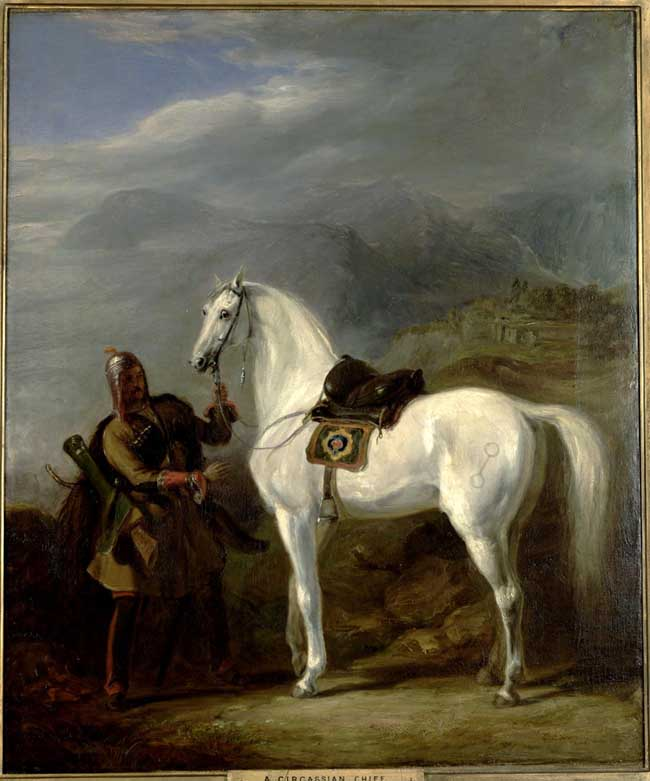
Circassian Chief (1843)

In 1826 Allan was appointed master of the Trustees' School, Edinburgh, an office which he held until a few years before his death. Soon afterwards his health gave way, and he was threatened with blindness. To recuperate he went to Rome, and, after spending a winter there, proceeded to Naples, Constantinople, Asia Minor, and Greece. In 1826 he exhibited Auld Robin Gray and in 1829 Prophet Jonah. In 1830 he returned to Edinburgh, restored to health. His picture Slave Market, Constantinople was purchased by Alexander Hill, the publisher, and Byron in a Fisherman's Hut after swimming the Hellespont (exhibited 1831) by R. Nasmyth, who also bought Allan's portraits of Burns and Sir Walter Scott, which were engraved by John Burnet.

In 1832 Allan was living at 8 Scotland Street in Edinburgh's New Town.

In 1834 he visited Spain and Morocco, and in the same year he produced The Orphan, which represented Scott's daughter Anne seated near the chair of her deceased father. In 1835 he was elected a Royal Academician, and in 1838, on the death of Sir George Watson, was made president of the Royal Scottish Academy. In 1841 he went to St. Petersburg, and in the same year succeeded Wilkie as limner to the queen in Scotland, an office which was, as usual, followed (in 1842) by a knighthood.

Sir William's later years were occupied with battle-pieces. In 1843 he exhibited Battle of Waterloo from the English side, which was purchased by the Duke of Wellington. The next year he went again to St. Petersburg, where he painted, for the Czar, Peter the Great teaching his Subjects the Art of Shipbuilding, which was later exhibited in London. The last large work which he finished was a second view of the battle of Waterloo, this time from the French side. It was exhibited at Westminster Hall in 1846, in competition for the decorations of the Houses of Parliament, but was unsuccessful. He visited Germany and France in 1847.

In his final years Sir William lived at 72 Great King Street, a substantial Georgian townhouse over five storeys, in Edinburgh's Second New Town. He died of Bronchitis at his Edinburgh home on 23 February 1850.

At the time of his death Sir William was engaged on a large picture of the Battle of Bannockburn.

He is buried in Dean Cemetery in Edinburgh against the north wall of the original cemetery backing onto the late Victorian extension.

== Works ==
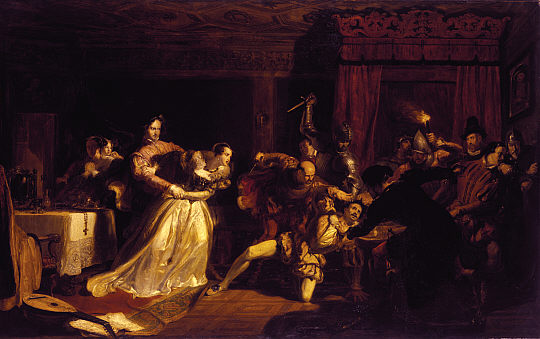
The Murder of David Rizzio (1833) depicts the killing of Queen Mary's secretary David Rizzio in her presence, an event which took place at Holyroodhouse in 1566.

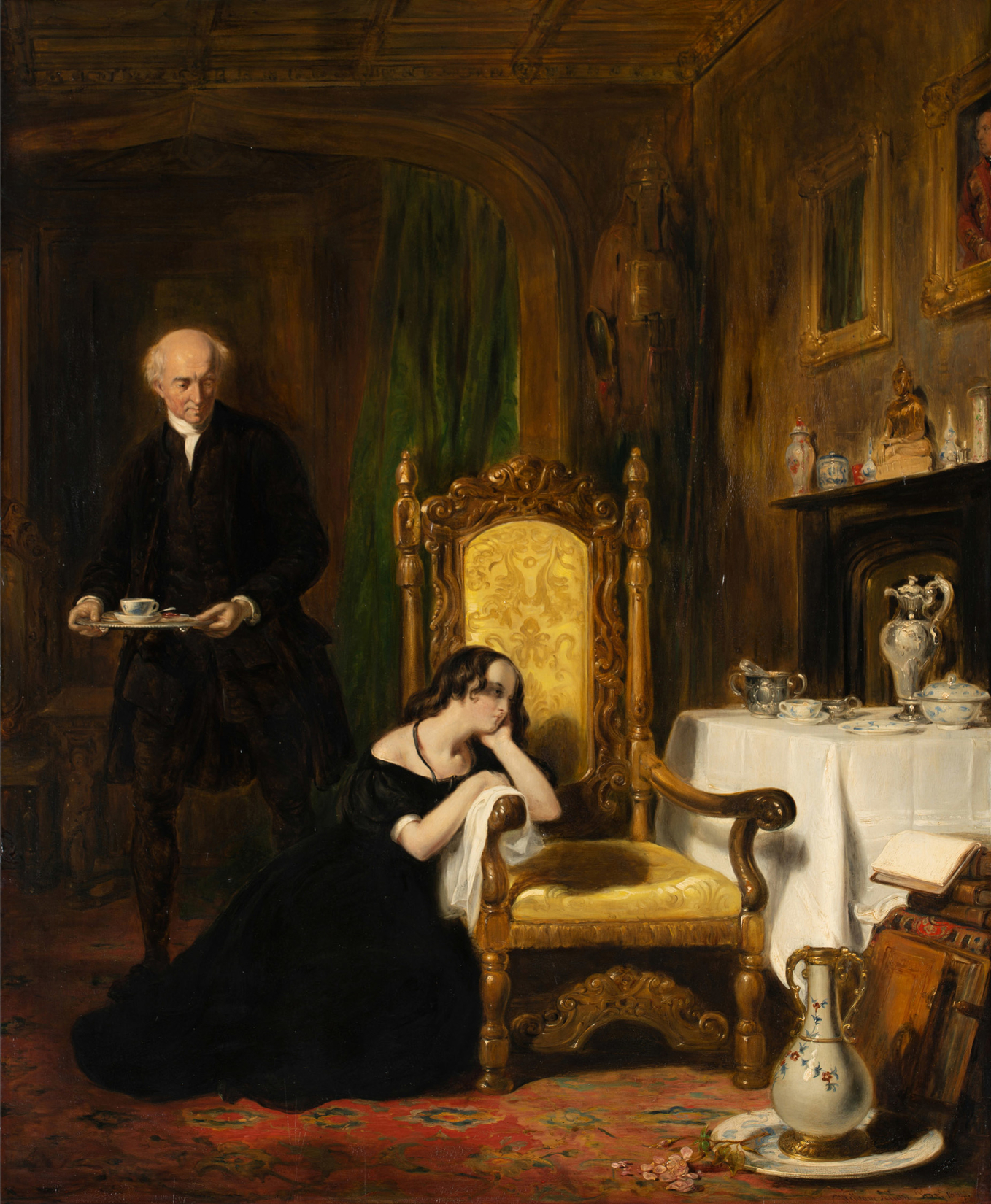
The Orphan, 1834

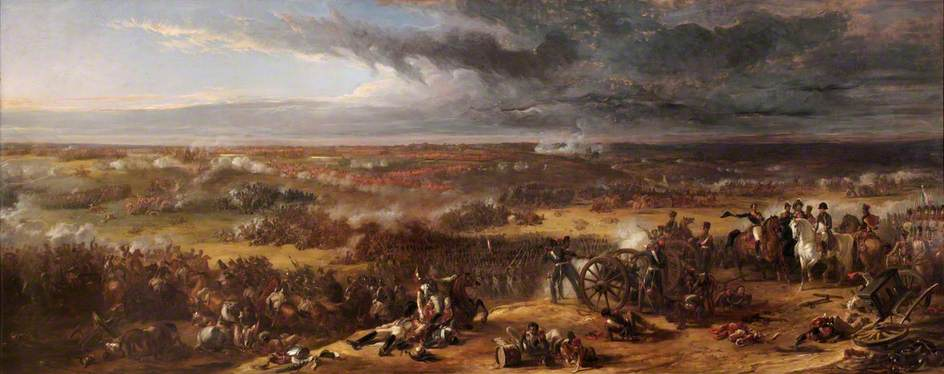
The Battle of Waterloo, 1843

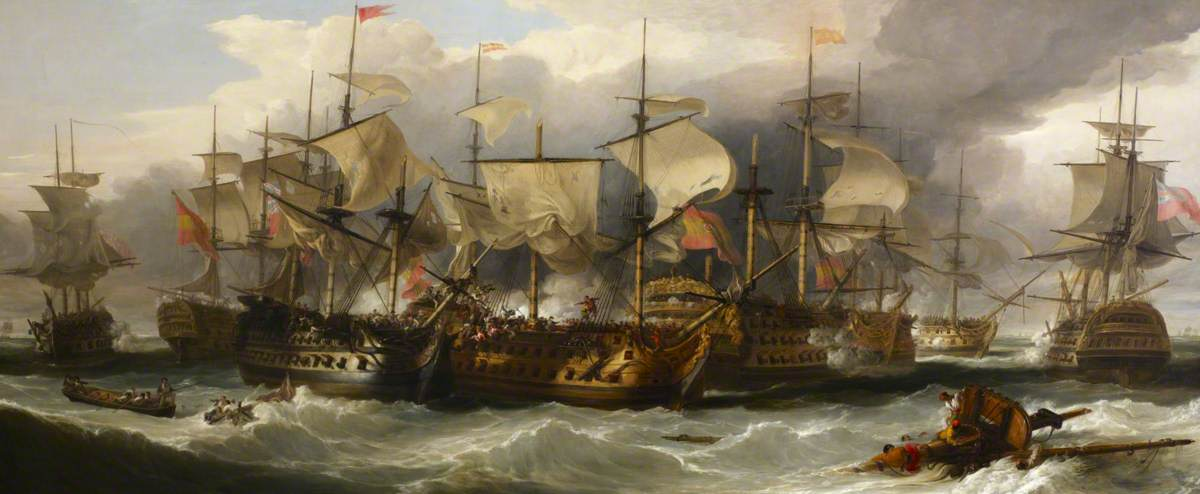
The Battle of Cape St Vincent, 1845

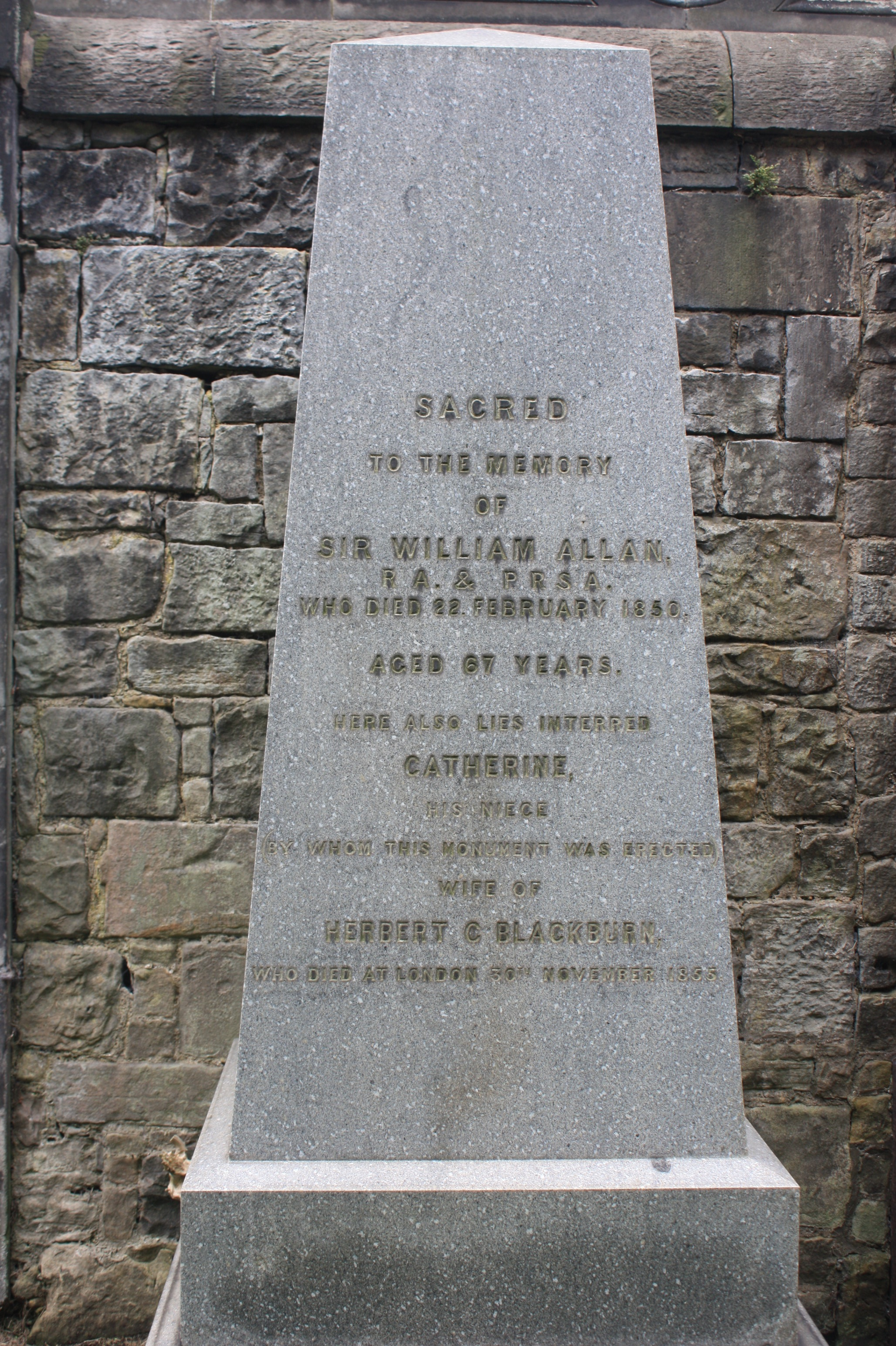
Sir William Allan's grave, Dean Cemetery

- Russian Peasants keeping their Holiday (1809)
- Bashkirs (1814, Hermitage)
- Frontier Guard (1814, Hermitage)
- The Sale of Circassian Captives to a Turkish Bashaw (1816)
- Tartar Robbers dividing Spoil (1817, Tate Gallery)
- John Knox admonishing Mary, Queen of Scots (1823)
- The Regent Murray shot by Hamilton of Bothwellhaugh (1825, Woburn Abbey)
- The Black Dwarf (1827, National Gallery of Scotland)
- Lord Byron in a Turkish Fisherman's House after swimming across the Hellespont (1831)
- Slave Market (1838, National Gallery of Scotland)
- The Signing of the National Covenant in Greyfriars Kirkyard (Edinburgh City Arts Centre)
- Heroism and Humanity (Robert the Bruce with soldiers) (1840 Kelvingrove Museum)
- The Recovery of the stolen Child (1841, Aberdeen, art gallery)
- Battle of Prestonpans (1842, private collection)
- Peter the Great teaching his Subjects the Art of Shipbuilding (1845, formerly in the Winter Palace of the Hermitage, now lost)
- Waterloo, 18 June 1815 (1843, His Grace Valerian Wellesley, 8th Duke of Wellington, Apsley House)
- The Duke of Wellington – en route to Quatre Bras (1844, private collection)
- The Battle of Waterloo (1845, Royal Military Academy Sandhurst)
- Battle of Bannockburn (Royal Scottish Academy, on loan to the Wallace Monument, Stirling)

== See also ==
- List of Orientalist artists
- Orientalism
