= Bashkirs (painting) =

1814 painting by William Allan

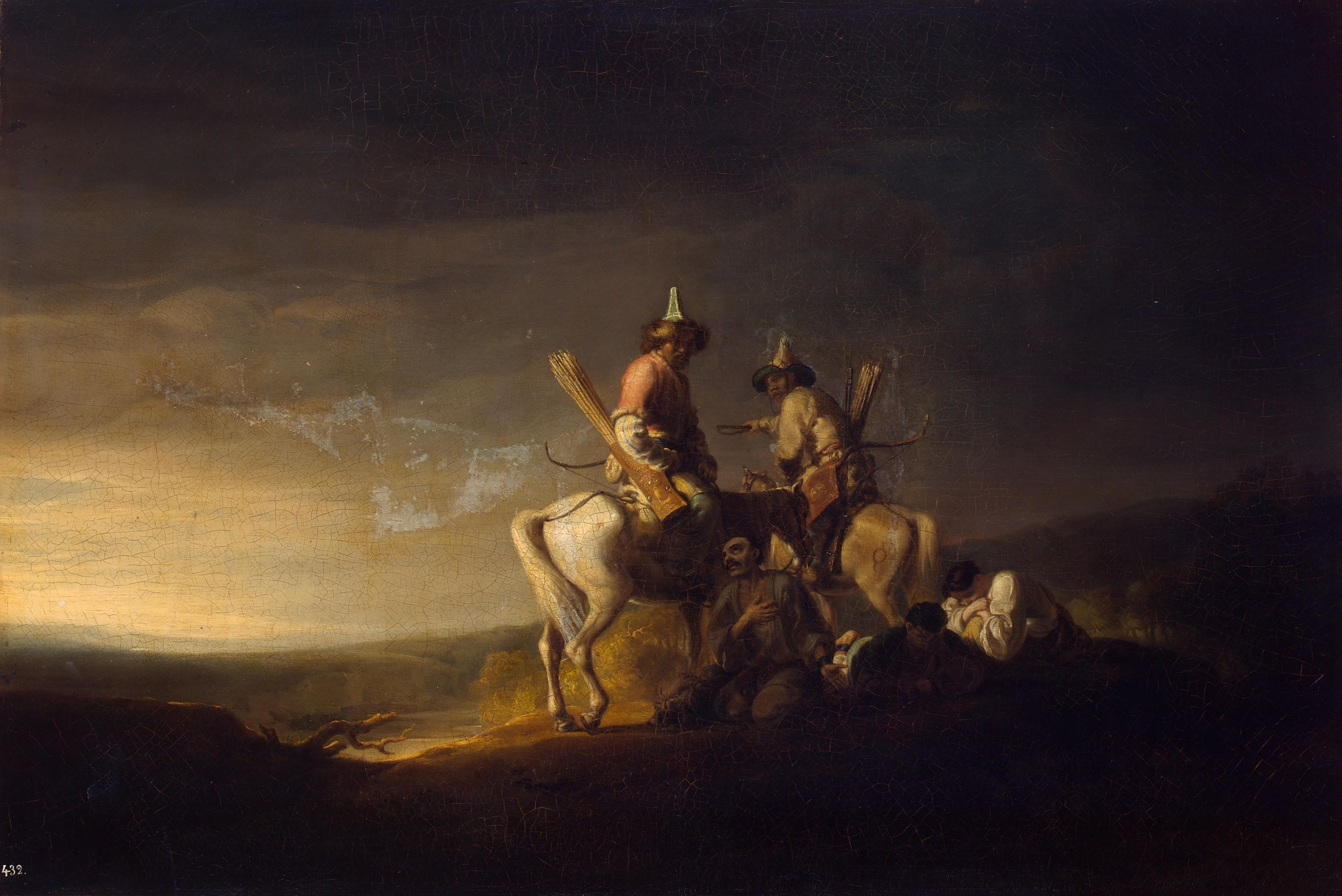
- Artist: William Allan
- Year: 1814
- Medium: oil on canvas
- Subject: Bashkirs escorting prisoners to Siberia
- Dimensions: 69 cm × 43 cm (27 in × 17 in)
- Location: Hermitage Museum, Saint Petersburg

Bashkirs is an oil on canvas painting by William Allan, painted in 1814. The original title of the painting was The Bashkirs, consorts sentenced to Siberia. It was exhibited at the Royal Academy Exhibition of 1815 at Somerset House in London. It is on display at the Hermitage Museum, in Saint Petersburg.

== History ==
The painting was created in the autumn of 1814 in Edinburgh, inspired by Allan’s travels through the Caucasus and the Caspian Lowlands in 1809–1810. It depicts a scene during nighttime, where two Bashkir horsemen are talking to three peasants. It accurately depicts the costumes and weaponry of Bashkir horsemen, who during the Napoleonic Wars served in the Russian army in roles similar to Cossack troops, including active military service and rear-guard escort duties.

In 1815, Allan held an exhibition in London featuring the works he created after his return from Russia. Bashkirs was publicly displayed for the first time at this event. The painting later remained in Allan’s studio in Edinburgh, where it was seen in December 1816 by the Grand Duke Nicholas Pavlovich, the future Emperor Nicholas I, during his travels in Great-Britain. He bought Allan three paintings, including this one.

Upon arrival in Russia, the painting was placed in Anichkov Palace, in Nicholas I’s personal study, and was cataloged under the title Two Bashkirs Talking to Three Peasants. In 1920, it was transferred to the Hermitage Museum. It was considered for export during the 1929 sale of Hermitage collections, but it was returned to the museum in 1931 and reinstated in the permanent exhibition under its now-established title Bashkirs.
