= Battle of Alnwick (1174) =

One of two battles fought near the town of Alnwick, in Northumberland, England

Coordinates: 55°25′00″N 1°43′02″W

- Part of Revolt Against Henry II
Date	13 July 1174
Location	near present day Alnwick, in Northumberland, England.
Result	English victory. Capture of William the Lion, leads to Treaty of Falaise

Belligerents
Kingdom of England	Kingdom of Scotland

Commanders and leaders
Ranulf Glanville	William the Lion (POW)

Units involved
Contingent of mounted knights	William's bodyguards Flemish Mercenaries

Strength
~400	~60

Casualties and losses
Unknown	All bodyguards either killed or captured

The Battle of Alnwick (1174) is one of two battles fought near the town of Alnwick, in Northumberland, England. In the battle, which took place on 13 July 1174, William I of Scotland, also known as William the Lion, was captured by a small English force led by Ranulf de Glanvill.

== Background ==
William had inherited the title of Earl of Northumbria in 1152. However, he had to give up this title to King Henry II of England in 1157. He spent much of his reign trying to regain his lost territory.

In 1173, whilst Henry II was occupied in fighting against his sons in the Revolt of 1173–1174, William saw his opportunity and invaded Northumbria. He advanced on Newcastle but found the partly built stone castle too strong to allow him to take the town. He also attacked Prudhoe Castle but found the defences too strong. Unwilling to undertake a lengthy siege, William returned to Scotland.

In 1174, William again invaded Northumbria with an even larger army that included a contingent of Flemish mercenaries. The army was said to have numbered eighty thousand men, but this is almost certainly an exaggeration. This time he avoided Newcastle but attacked Prudhoe Castle again. The castle had been strengthened since the previous year and after a siege of three days William moved north to besiege Alnwick. William divided his army into three columns and one of these, under the command of Duncan, Earl of Fife, attacked Warkworth and set fire to the church of St Lawrence with a large number of refugees inside.

== Battle ==
William made the fatal error of allowing his army to spread out, instead of concentrating them around his base at Alnwick. On the night of 11 July, a party of about four hundred mounted knights, led by Ranulf de Glanvill, set out from Newcastle and headed towards Alnwick. This small fighting force contained several seasoned knights, who had fought against the Scots before. They reached Alnwick shortly after dawn after becoming lost in heavy fog. There they found William’s encampment, where the Scottish king was only protected by a bodyguard of perhaps sixty fighting men. At the sound of alarm, William rushed from his tent and hurriedly prepared to fight. The English force charged and the Scottish king and his bodyguard met the charge head on. The fighting did not last long. William’s horse was killed beneath him and he was captured. Those of his followers who had not been killed surrendered.

== Aftermath ==
William was brought back to Newcastle as a captive. His army found itself leaderless and wandered back to Scotland. William was held at Newcastle for a time but it was not considered strong enough, and he was finally moved to Falaise in Normandy. Whilst he was there, Henry sent an army to occupy part of Scotland, with its five strongest castles: Roxburgh, Berwick, Jedburgh, Edinburgh, and Stirling.

To obtain his freedom, William was forced to sign the Treaty of Falaise, under which he swore an oath of allegiance to the English king and agreed to the garrisoning of the captured castles by English soldiers at Scottish expense. When William was released, after signing the treaty, he travelled back to Scotland via Newcastle, and was attacked by a mob; such was the antipathy of the local people towards Scottish invaders.

== Subsequent history ==
The Treaty of Falaise lasted for fifteen years until Richard the Lionheart effectively sold the castle back to William in order to fund his crusade to the Holy Land.

This was the last attempt by a Scottish king to regain lost territories in northern England. In 1237, under the Treaty of York, Alexander II of Scotland abandoned his forefathers’ claims to Northumbria and Cumbria, and set the boundary between the two kingdoms as running between the Solway Firth (in the west), and the mouth of the River Tweed (in the east), although in the east, it now leaves the River Tweed to swing around Berwick, which finally became an English town in 1482 after centuries of changing hands Treaty of Fotheringhay. The border meets the North Sea just north of Berwick at Marshall Meadows Bay.
