= Rawdon Briggs =

Rawdon Briggs may refer to:

- Rawdon Briggs (cricketer) (1853–1936), English cricketer and clergyman
- Rawdon Briggs (politician) (1792–1859), British politician
