= Cuthbert Rayne =

English huntsman

Cuthbert Rayne or Reyne or Raine was an English huntsman who served James VI of Scotland. James VI employed several English hunters and kennelmen who organised his field sports and looked after his dogs, including "Robert the English hunter", Cuthbert Armourer, Edward Dodsworth, and Cuthbert Rayne. In 1582, new kennels were built at Holyrood Palace for dogs brought to James by an English huntsman, Nicholas Poorhouse. English aristocrats wishing to court the king's favour sent dogs, in 1585 Philip Sidney sent a "lyme hound".

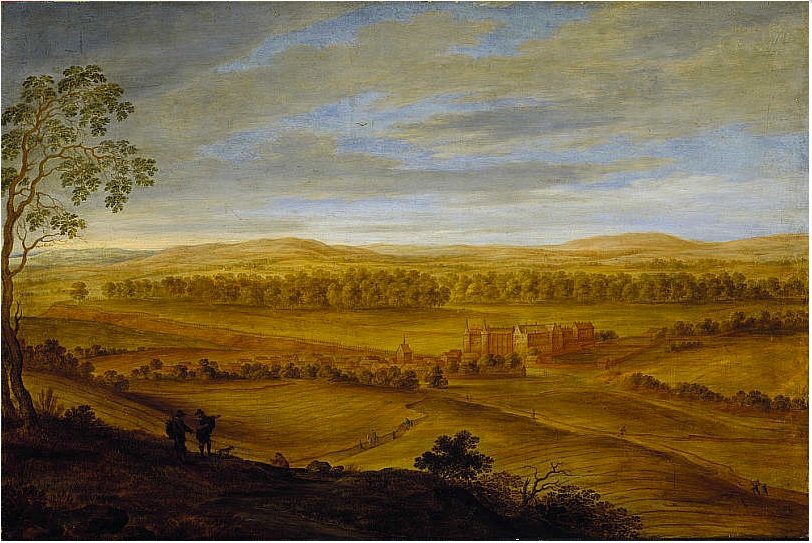
Falkland Palace, by Alexander Keirincx

== Background ==
Cuthbert Rayne's family lived at Marwood near Barnard Castle in Teesdale. A younger namesake cousin, Cuthbert Reyne, was a Catholic, and joined the English College in Rome in 1613. He wrote of his cousin, a son of Nicholas Reyne who lived at "Rogermy" (Roger Moor, at Marwood), that he was "in high favour with the King, for when Elizabeth was yet reigning, he used every year to visit Scotland and go to the King for the sake of hunting".

According to the Venetian ambassador, Foscarini, the king's love of hunting stemmed from his education at Stirling Castle, where George Buchanan ensured that hunting hares in the park was his only leisure from his books. In March 1586, thirty bucks (male deer) were sent to James VI from the parks of the Earl of Northumberland, for the park at Falkland. James VI went to see the deer unloaded from the carts that brought them from Leith. He asked the English diplomat Thomas Randolph if Elizabeth I would send huntsmen and horses, "yeoman prickers" and "grooms of the leash". Some huntsmen and bucks were sent to James VI in August 1586 by Thomas Randolph, who was at Newcastle, and the Scottish ambassador in London, Archibald Douglas. Randolph wrote:

I have sent the Kynge two hunting men, verie good and skillful, with one footman, that can hoop, hollow and crye, that all the trees in Fawkland will quake for fear. Pray the Kynge's Majestie to be mercifull to the poor bucks; but let him spare and look well to himself.

According to Courcelles, a French diplomat in Edinburgh, when James VI learned the life of Mary, Queen of Scots was in jeopardy in February 1587. He said that if Elizabeth meddled with his mother's life he would return more than the "dogges and deare" she sent him as gifts.

One "Cuthbert the hunter", either Cuthbert Armourer or Cuthbert Rayne, was given a reward of 20 French crowns in 1588. George Young made this payment, while Richard Cockburn gave 200 crowns to English hunters. Archibald Arnot in Falkland was paid £80 Scots towards feeding English huntsmen. In 1589, another 20 crowns was paid to an English hunter.

== Cuthbert Rayne and the export of deer ==
In April 1592, the English ambassador in Scotland Robert Bowes decided to ask Cuthbert Rayne to help him organise a gift of deer for James VI, to be sent to stock the park at Falkland Palace. Bowes obtained warrants for deer from the English keepers from Elizabeth I. It would be the queen's gift to James VI. Rayne, who was evidently a member of the gentry, went to London and met William Cecil then travelled north to meet Bowes. They planned to visit Barnard Castle, Raby Castle, and Brancepeth Castle to capture seventy deer. Bowes was urgently requested to return to Scotland, leaving Rayne in charge.

At the end of May, Cuthbert Rayne had caught 21 male deer. However they had been hurt by the nets and the "buck stawles" used by Rayne's men. They were also injured by the dogs chasing them into the nets. Six were loaded into a Scottish boat hired by Bowes waiting at Sunderland, and shipped to Kirkcaldy for Falkland. Bowes anticipated and was told by the king's courtier Roger Aston that James VI would be very disappointed by their results. The difficulty was partly from the use of "buck staulls" to restrain the deer, borrowed from the Earl of Derby which were suitable only for red deer, not for fallow. Bowes wondered if another gentlemen might supervise any further attempts.

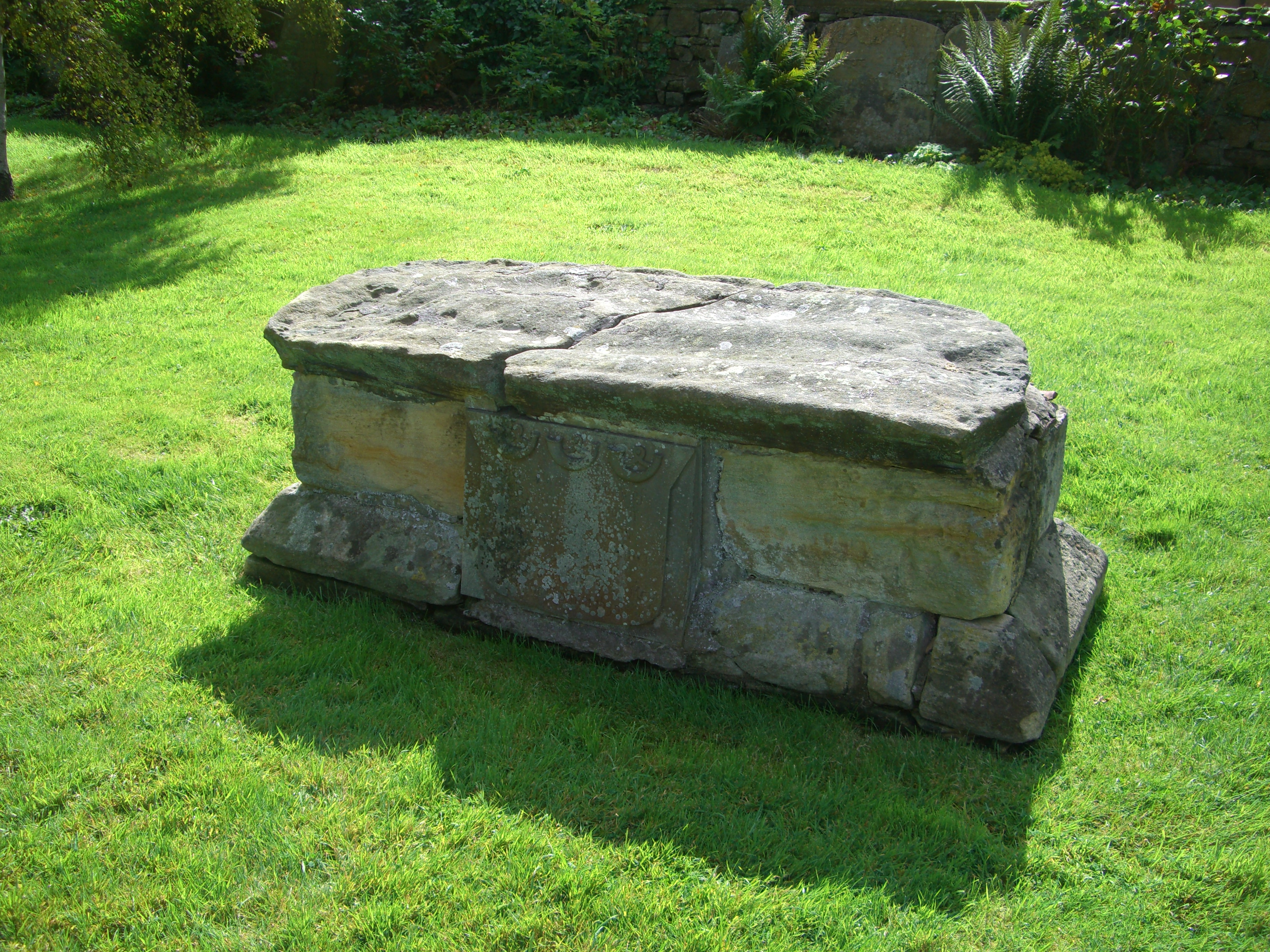
The 'Huntsman's tomb' at St Lawrence, Warkworth, Northumberland

Henry Sackford, the English "Master of Toyles" was paid for collecting 40 deer for Scotland in March 1597. James Hudson brought 28 live deer to Scotland in April and James VI made a trip to Leith to see them. The deer were taken to Falkland in carts.

== Rayne and Dodsworth ==
In August 1594, James VI requested that the governor of Berwick-upon-Tweed allow Cuthbert Rayne and another English huntsman Edward Dodsworth to cross the border. He was surprised they had been hindered, as he thought the governor "lovit the game your selfe sum tymes". This incident accords with the description given by his cousin in 1613, that Rayne visited Scotland in the hunting season. His companion, Edward Dodsworth from Chevington or Romaldkirk in Teesdale, died in 1630 and was buried at Warkworth, where his gravestone blazoned with three bugles recorded him as "huntsman to King James". His brother and nephews also served as royal huntsmen.

== Robert Rayne, royal huntsman ==
In England, Robert Rayne was yeoman of the privy harriers and sergeant of the "old buck hounds" a pack transferred by James VI and I to the use of his son Henry Frederick, Prince of Wales. His appointment as a yeoman pricker of the privy harriers for life was confirmed in 1626 by Charles I. Robert Rayne worked with Walter Rayne, Cuthbert Armourer, and members of the Dodsworth family.
