= Church of St Lawrence, Warkworth =

Grade I listed church in the United Kingdom

Coordinates: 55.349127°N 1.612138°W

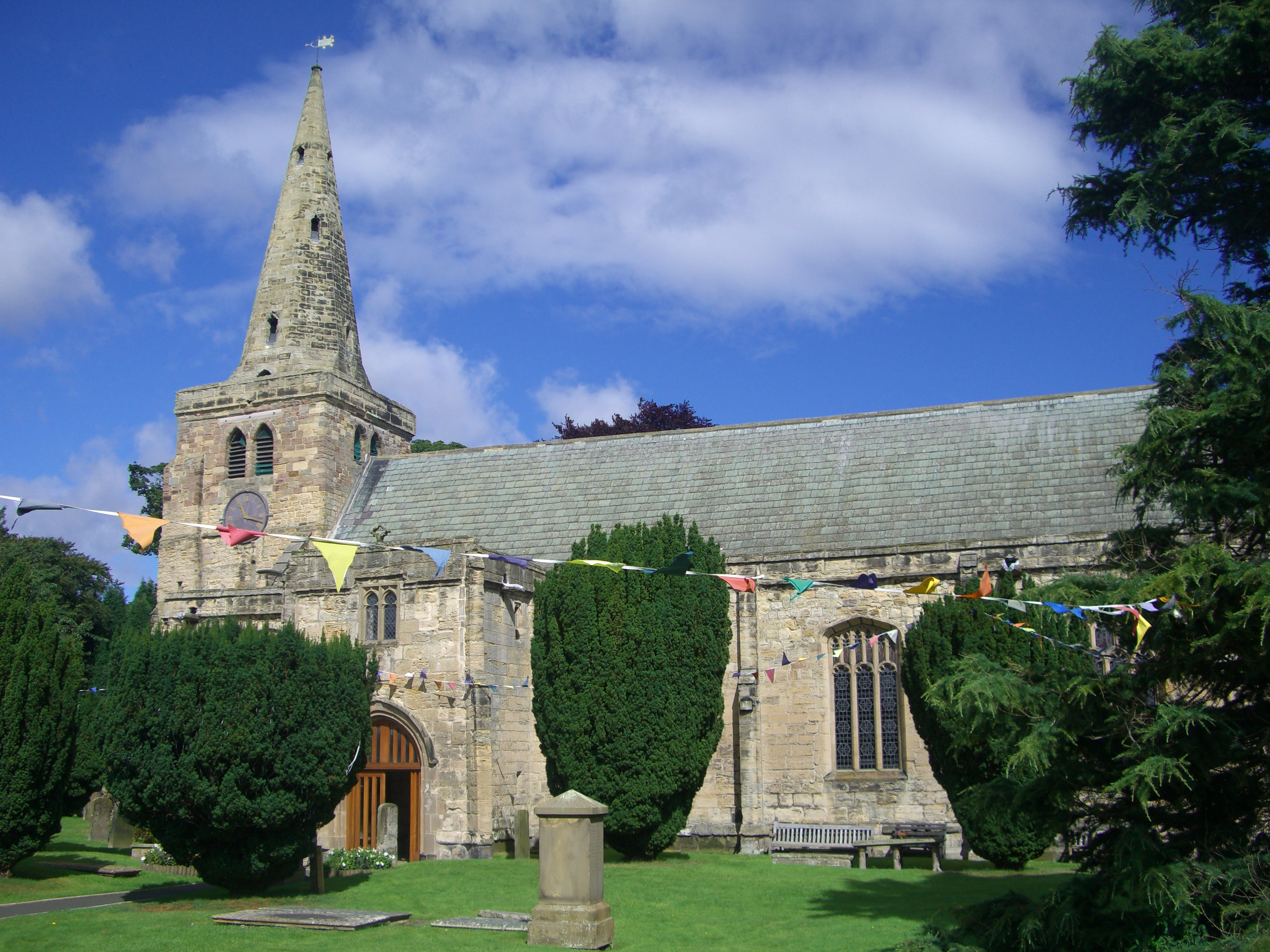

The Church of St Lawrence is situated in the village of Warkworth in Northumberland. It is a grade I listed building within the Diocese of Newcastle and dedicated to St Lawrence of Rome.

== History ==
=== Early history ===
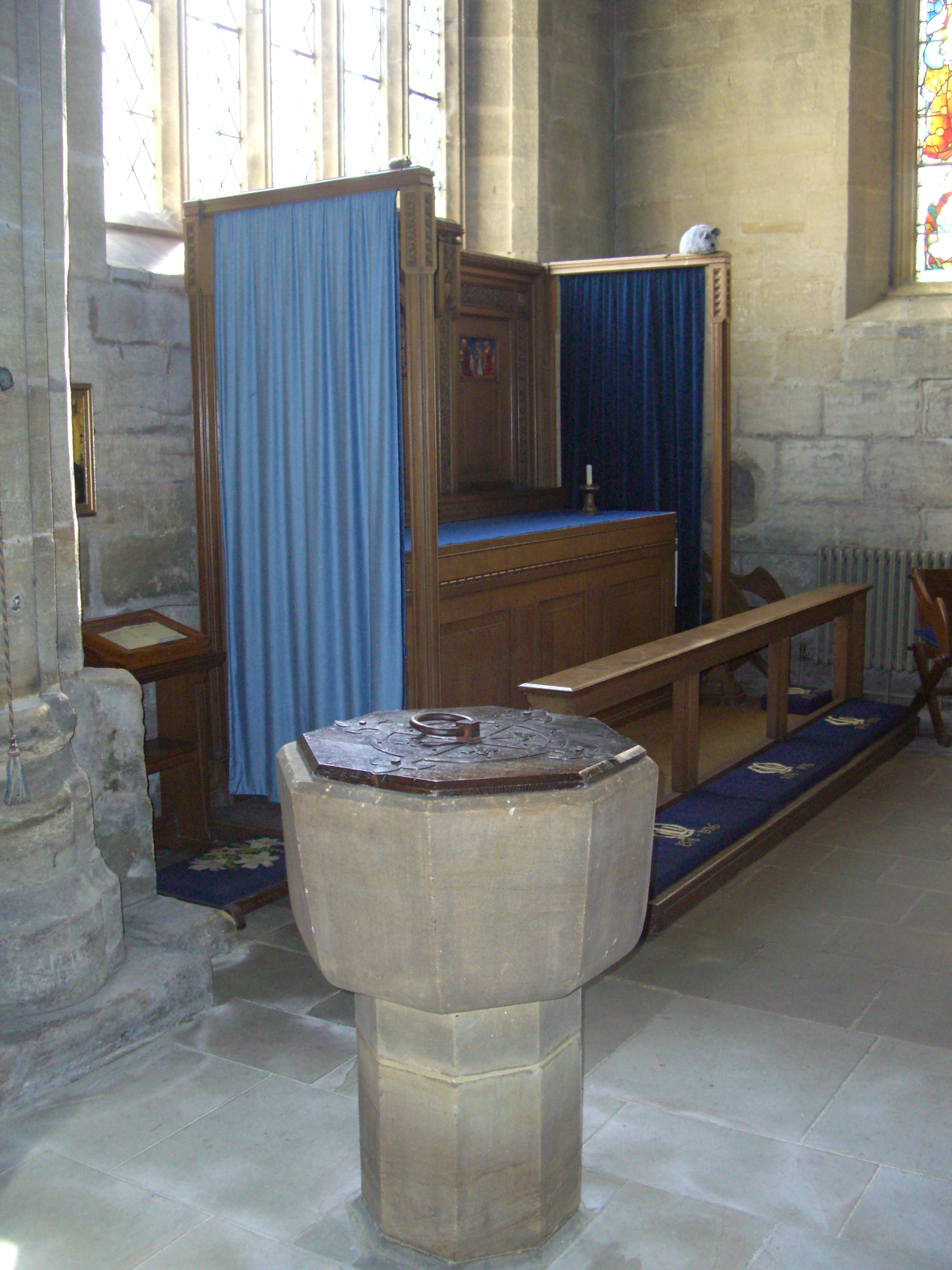
The font and the Lady Chapel.

The present church dates from the 12th century, however a wooden Anglo-Saxon church was mentioned as occupying the site in AD 737, when King Ceolwulf of Northumbria gave Wercewode (as Warkworth was then known) along with St Lawrence's church to the Abbot and monks of Lindisfarne. The wooden church was almost certainly destroyed in the Danish raids of 875 when Halfdan Ragnarsson “pitched his camp by the Tyne and wasted the land cruelly from sea to sea". The church was rebuilt in stone during the 9th and 10th centuries; foundations of this church were discovered in 2008 beneath the present church when an investigative trench was dug. In 1120 Henry I gave St Lawrence's along with the churches at Corbridge, Rothbury and Whittingham to his chaplain Richard de Aurea Valle. Upon his death, all four churches were given to and became part of the newly formed Diocese of Carlisle and would remain so until Newcastle became a separate diocese in 1882.

=== Present day church ===
Building of the church as we see it today began in 1132; it was constructed not only as a holy place but also as a sanctuary for the villagers in dangerous times. It had very substantial walls, with very narrow, high windows to keep out the enemy. On Saturday 13 July 1174, the day of the Battle of Alnwick, Donnchad II, Earl of Fife, commanding a column of the Scottish King William the Lion’s army, entered Warkworth and set fire to the town, killing 300 of the inhabitants who had taken refuge in the church. Around the year 1200 a tower was built at the western end of the church although the belfry and the spire were not added until the 14th century. In the 15th century the south aisle and entrance porch were added; above the porch there is a parvise which is reached by a spiral staircase; prior to 1736 it served as a schoolroom.

In October 1715 Warkworth was the first market town in England to proclaim The Old Pretender as King in the Jacobite rising; his Chaplain read morning prayers in the church on 9 October. On 16 May 1761 John Wesley visited the church to preach a sermon whilst on a visit to nearby Alnwick. In 1860 there were extensive restorations with a new roof being applied, which resulted in the loss of the clerestory windows on the south wall. At the same time plaster was removed from the interior walls and the box pews were replaced by bench pews.

=== Post war developments ===
Changes to the church since World War II have seen pews removed from the south aisle and the floor relaid in Caithness stone in 1947. The churchyard has had a new drainage system installed, trees removed and headstones placed around the perimeter walls. The electrical, heating and sound system have been upgraded, while in 1983 the church organ was overhauled.

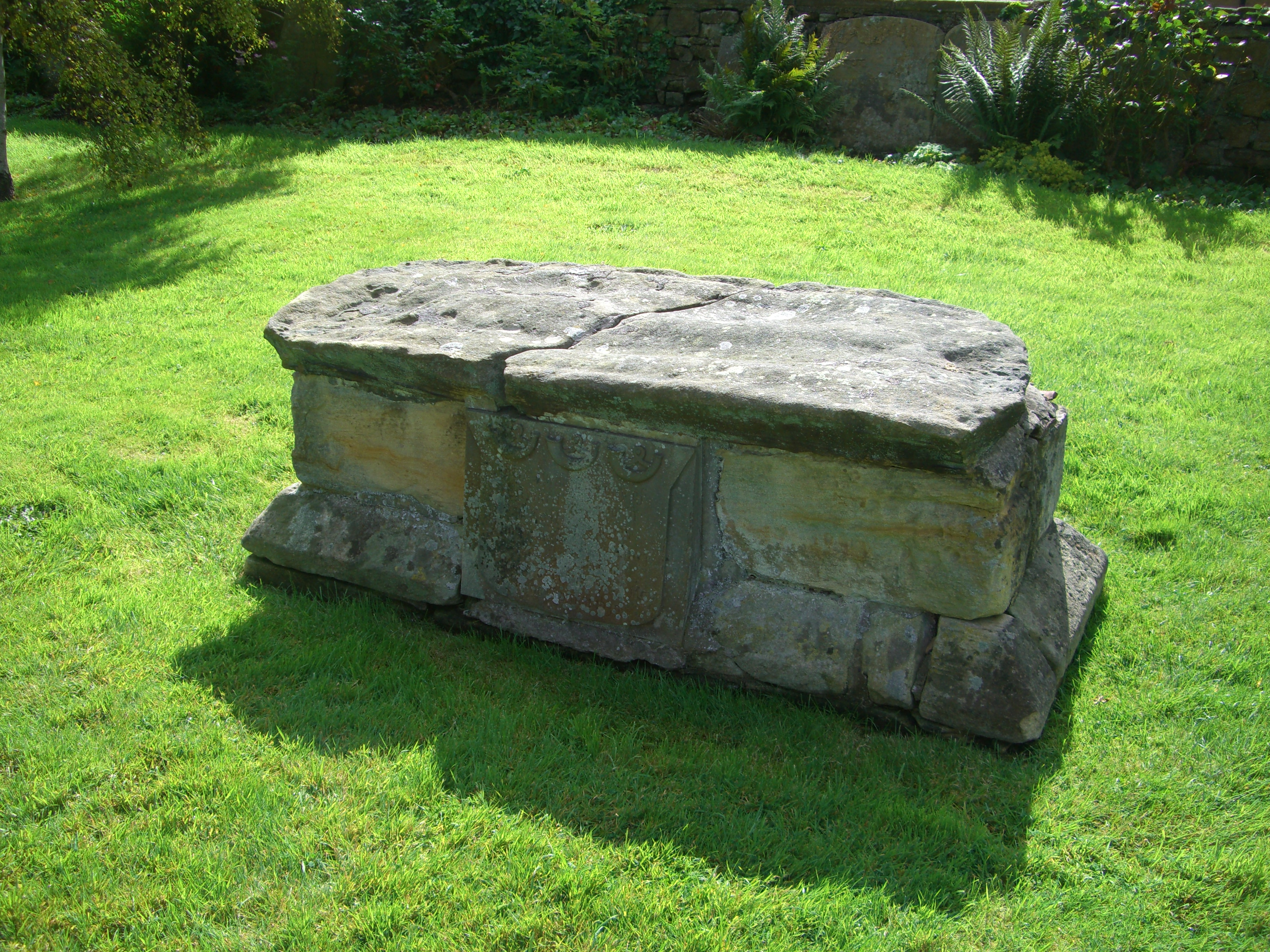
The huntsman's tomb in the churchyard.

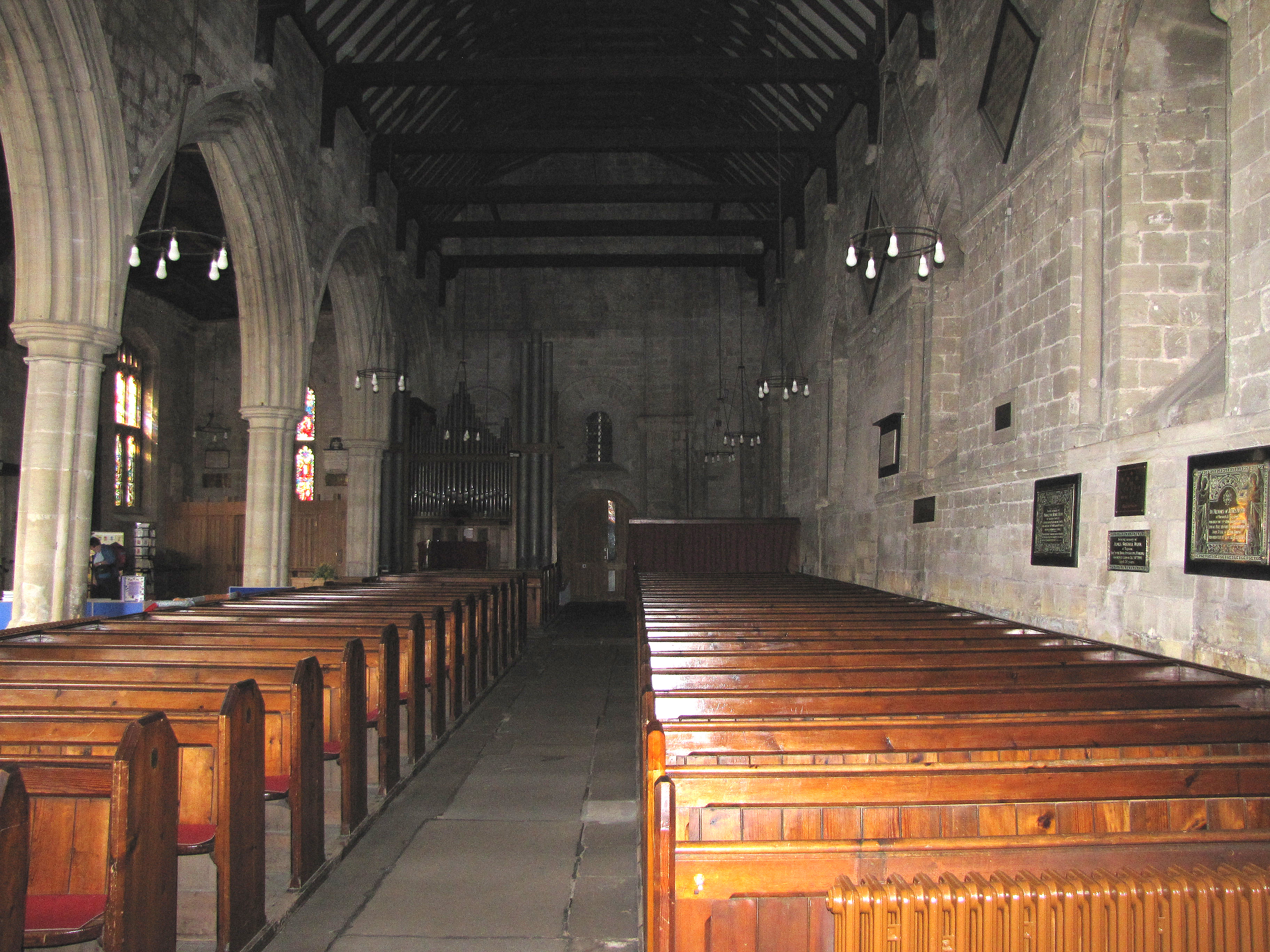
The nave is 90 feet long.

=== Work on the north wall ===
Movement in the north wall had been known since the 13th century when the tower was erected and buttresses were built to prevent lateral movement in the wall. The wall was built on shallow medieval foundations on alluvial sand and clay close to the tidal River Coquet. Investigations in 2006 showed that the wall was 19 inches out of line and in a dangerous condition; this resulted in the church being placed on English Heritage’s Buildings at Risk Register. In March 2009 work started to secure and stabilise the wall, repair any ensuing damage to the interior of the church and prevent further deterioration. Two new buttresses were built resting on 22-metre piles which went down to the bedrock. The work cost £300,000 with the money coming from grant aid from English Heritage and from a successful fund-raising campaign by the Parochial Church Council. The church was removed from the Buildings at Risk Register on completion of the work.

== Church features ==
=== Exterior ===
The church is constructed from squared stone with a graduated Lakeland slate roof to the nave and chancel and a leaded roof to the rest of the church. The present church clock has a slate face with gilded numerals and dates from 1875. It was supplied and fitted by Mr Joyce Whitchurch at a cost of £154.12s. Near the old priests' door into the chancel are three medieval stone coffins which were found under the church floor.

Near the main gate is a distinctive tomb which is the final resting place of Edward Dodsworth of East Chevington, huntsman to King James, who died on 30 May 1630. Dodsworth hunted deer in Scotland with Cuthbert Rayne for King James in the 1590s.

=== Interior ===
The nave at 27.6 metres (90 feet) is the longest Norman nave in Northumberland; it has a 19th-century scissor-braced roof and was restored in 1860 by John Dobson. The south aisle was built by the Percy family in the 15th century; its east window has the only surviving pieces of medieval glass in the church. The pulpit has five panels each featuring a work of art by Alfred Southwick, including St Lawrence blessing the poor and St Hilda of Whitby. On the right of the main door is the Knight's Tomb in the chantry; it features an image of a cross-legged knight from the 14th century, with a shield bearing the arms of the de Abulyn family of Durham.
