= Cuthbert Armourer =

Cuthbert Armourer or Armorer (born 1534 – d. unknown) was an English soldier at Berwick-upon-Tweed, a messenger, and found favour with James VI of Scotland as a huntsman.

== Career ==
The Armourer family lived near Berwick. Cuthbert Armourer became a "constable of horse" in the garrison, and also served as deputy of Norham Castle.

Cuthbert, or "Cuddie" Armourer of Belford, was an exile with Jane Howard, Countess of Westmorland after the Rising of the North in 1569, and came to Ferniehirst Castle.

English huntsmen visited James VI in season. Armourer was active in Scotland as one of the king's huntsman before April 1583 when the English ambassador Robert Bowes reported that his hunting had "well pleased" James VI, while he supplied useful intelligence to the diplomat. Bowes wrote a recommendation to Francis Walsingham for Armourer, The treasurer's accounts record that Cuthbert Armourer was at Falkland Palace in June 1584 with the huntsman John Home and was given 20 crowns worth £50 Scots.

In August 1584, Armourer, as a servant or tenant of Lord Hunsdon, attended a border meeting at Foulden with the Scottish huntsman John Hume of Manderston. Armourer seems to have become a go-between for Hunsdon and James Stewart, Earl of Arran, who was at this time a dominant figure in Scottish politics.

Armourer became so close to James VI, according to the Master of Gray, that James wept with "Cuddy Armerer" over the rumours that David Rizzio was his father.

Armourer carried letters and was a mediator with the discourted James Stewart, Earl of Arran. Armourer was not only a messager but discussed the negotiations of Archibald Douglas at the English court with William Selby. In September 1585, the English diplomat Edward Wotton, who was at Stirling Castle complained to Francis Walsingham that Armourer was negotiating on behalf of James Stewart, Earl of Arran, prejudicing his mission or displacing him. In December 1592, Arran came to Holyroodhouse and met James VI at the kennels.

One "Cuthbert the hunter", either Cuthbert Armourer or Cuthbert Rayne, was given a reward of 20 French crowns in 1588. George Young made this payment, while Richard Cockburn gave 200 crowns to English hunters. Archibald Arnot in Falkland was paid £80 Scots towards feeding English huntsmen. In 1589, another 20 crowns was paid to an English hunter.

In July 1590, John Crane, an officer of the Berwick garrison wrote about the progress of repairs at Norham. Armourer had enlisted the services of the surveyor of Berwick William Ackrigg.

James VI became suspicious in January 1593 that Cuthbert Armourer and Thomas Musgrave and other Northumbrians harboured his rebel Francis Stewart, 5th Earl of Bothwell, with the encouragement of Elizabeth I. The English ambassador assured him that he was misled by tale tellers. His activities, and the exploits of his sons and nephews, including David, Clement, Robert, and Harry Armourer (b. 1578) attracted suspicion. For a time, James VI continued to insist on the punishment and rendition of "Cuddye Armour" and Thomas Musgrave. Armourer was forgiven by December 1593 and he was employed by the Governor of Berwick to carry messages to Edinburgh.

Peregrine Bertie, 13th Baron Willoughby de Eresby, as governor of Berwick in 1601 noted that Armourer, who was in debt, was esteemed and held his place because he had done an importrant service for Elizabeth I in 1601. Eventually, after the Union of the Crowns, Cuthbert Armourer was granted the office of Chief Steward of Hexham.
