= Rawdon Briggs (cricketer) =

English cricketer and clergyman

Personal information
- Born: 30 December 1853; Warkworth, Northumberland, England
- Died: 21 August 1936 (aged 82); Bedford, Bedfordshire, England
- Batting: Right-handed
- Bowling: Right-arm roundarm fast

Domestic team information
- Years: Team
- 1875–1876: Oxford University

Career statistics
Competition	First-class
Matches	10
Runs scored	342
Batting average	21.37
100s/50s	0/1
Top score	71
Catches/stumpings	8/–
- Source: Cricinfo, 13 January 2020

Rawdon Briggs (30 December 1853 – 21 August 1936) was an English first-class cricketer and clergyman.

The son of Rawdon Briggs senior, he was born in December 1853 at Warkworth, Northumberland. He was educated at Winchester College, before going up to St John's College, Oxford. While studying at Oxford, Briggs played first-class cricket for Oxford University in 1874 and 1875, making ten appearances. He scored 342 runs in his ten first-class matches, at an average of 21.37 and with a highest score of 71. After graduating from Oxford, he took holy orders in the Anglican Church. He was the canon of All Saints, Bradford from 1877–82 and was the vicar there from 1882. Briggs died at Bedford in August 1936.
