= Jedburgh Castle =

Castle, later rebuilt as a jail, in Jedburgh, Scottish Borders

Coordinates: 55°28′27″N 2°33′32″W

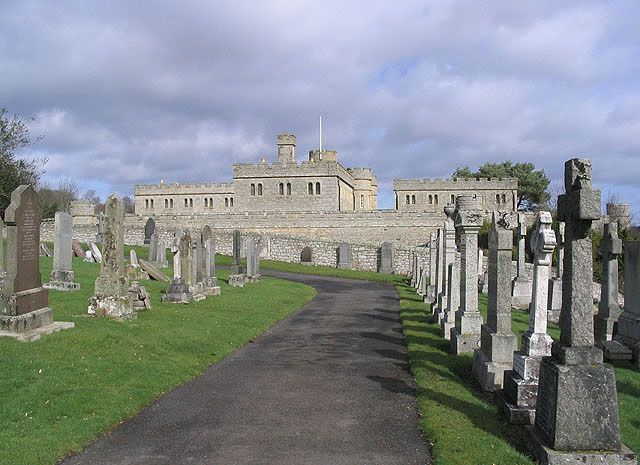
Jedburgh Castle Jail

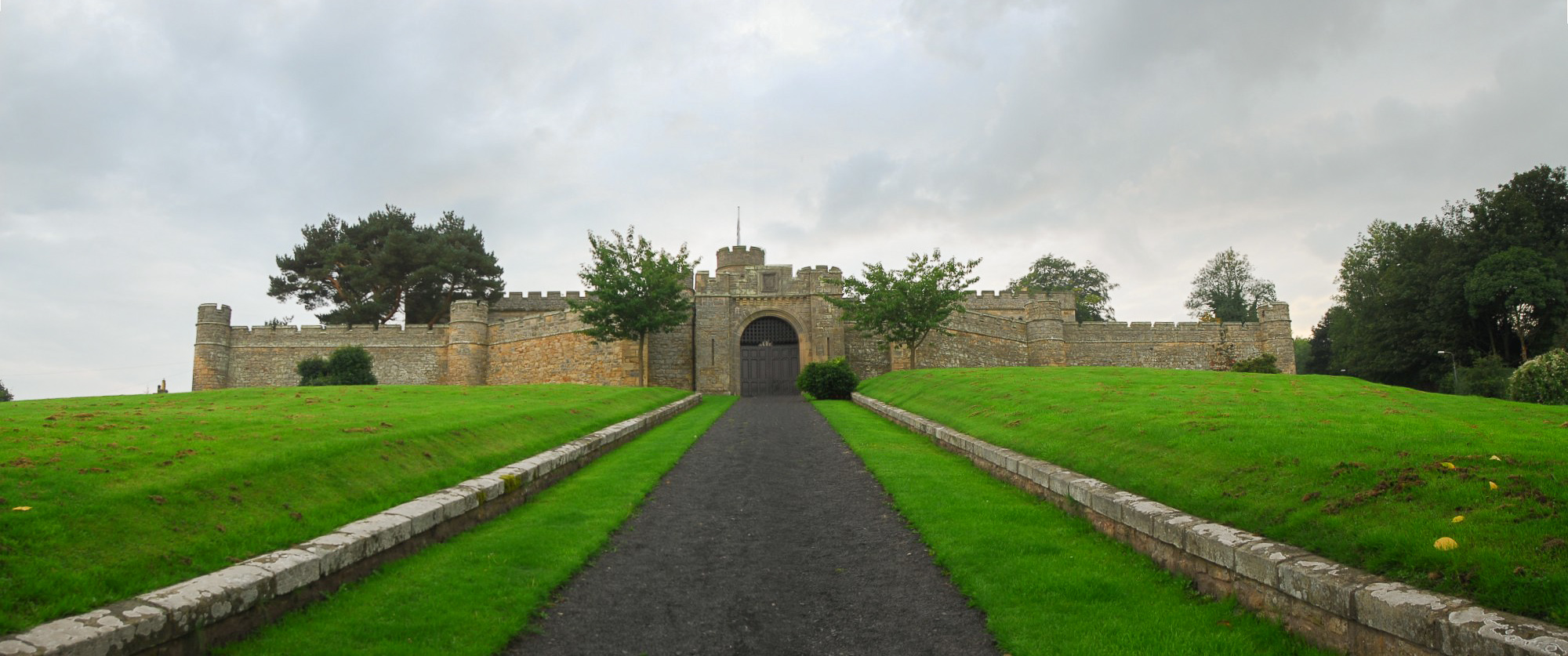
Panorama of Jedburgh Castle

Jedburgh Castle was a castle at Jedburgh in Scotland. It was fought over during the Wars of Scottish Independence, and was demolished by the Scots commanded by Sir James Douglas of Balvenie in 1409. The site of the original castle was used to build the reform prison based on the John Howard system, the construction of which started in 1820.

== Jedburgh Castle Jail ==
In 1823 a jail was built on the site to designs by Archibald Elliot. It was modified in 1847 by Thomas Brown. This closed in 1868. The building was restored to an 1820s appearance in 1968 by Aitken and Turnbull. It opened to the public as Jedburgh Castle Jail and Museum. The museum features local history displays.

On the Thursday after Shrove Tuesday, the town has played a Ba Game since 1704. The uppies team use the castle to record their victories.

== See also ==
- List of places in the Scottish Borders
- List of places in Scotland
