= Warkworth, Northumberland =

Village in Northumberland, England

Coordinates: 55.345°N 1.611°W

Warkworth
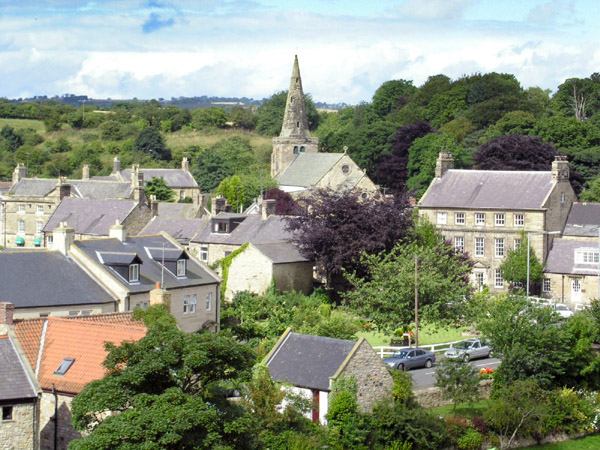
- Warkworth village and church, viewed from the northeast (August 2003)

- Location within Northumberland
- Population: 1,772 (2021 Census)
- OS grid reference: NU246057
- Unitary authority: Northumberland
- Ceremonial county: Northumberland
- Region: North East
- Country: England
- Sovereign state: United Kingdom
- Post town: MORPETH
- Postcode district: NE65
- Dialling code: 01665
- Police: Northumbria
- Fire: Northumberland
- Ambulance: North East
- UK Parliament: North Northumberland

Warkworth is a village in Northumberland, England. It is probably best known for its well-preserved medieval castle, church and hermitage. The population of Warkworth was 1,574 in 2011, increasing to 1,772 at the 2021 Census.

The village is situated in a loop of the River Coquet, about 1 mile (1.6 km) from the Northumberland coast and lies on the main A1068 road. It is 30 miles (48 km) north of Newcastle, and about 40 miles (64 km) south of the Scottish border. An ancient bridge of two arches crosses the river at Warkworth, with a fortified gateway on the road mounting to the castle, the site of which is surrounded on three sides by the river.

Warkworth is popular with visitors for its old buildings, its walks by the River Coquet, and its proximity to the Northumberland Coast, an Area of Outstanding Natural Beauty (AONB). It is twinned with Warkworth, New Zealand, which is named after it.

== History ==
A church has existed on the riverside site in the village for around 1,200 years. St Lawrence's Church is a large and almost completely Norman building, which is unique in Northumberland. The first record of the village dates from 737AD when King Ceolwulf of Northumbria gave the church and village to the Abbot and monks of Lindisfarne. In 1174, the church was the scene of a massacre when some 300 people were brutally butchered by Duncan, Earl of Fife during a Scottish raid. John Law was vicar of Warkworth in the 1770s.

Warkworth Castle was founded at an uncertain date; traditionally its construction has been ascribed to Prince Henry of Scotland in the mid-12th century, but it may have been built by King Henry II of England when he took control of England's northern counties. A timber castle was first documented in a charter of 1157–1164 when Henry II granted it to Roger fitz Richard. However it was considered "feeble", and was left undefended when the Scots invaded in 1173.

Roger's son Robert inherited and improved the castle. Robert was a favourite of King John, and hosted him at Warkworth Castle in 1213. The castle remained in the family line, with periods of guardianship when heirs were too young to control their estates. King Edward I stayed overnight in 1292 and John de Clavering, a descendant of Roger fitz Richard, made the Crown his inheritor. With the outbreak of the Anglo-Scottish Wars, Edward II invested in castles including Warkworth where he funded the strengthening of the garrison in 1319. Twice in 1327 the Scots besieged the castle without success.

The castle came to the House of Percy in Edward III's reign and is still held by their descendants the dukes of Northumberland, despite some brief changes of ownership in the 15th century.

During the 18th century the castle was allowed to languish. The south-west tower was falling apart and around 1752 part of the curtain wall east of the gatehouse was demolished (it was rebuilt towards the end of the century). The town and its historic ruins were by now attracting interest as a tourist destination, largely due to Bishop Thomas Percy's poem, The Hermit of Warkworth. In the mid 19th century Hugh Percy, 3rd Duke of Northumberland, undertook some preservation work. His successor, Algernon Percy, contracted Anthony Salvin to restore the keep.

The castle became a scheduled monument in 1915. In 1922 Alan Percy, 8th Duke of Northumberland, granted custodianship of the castle to the Office of Works which had been made accountable for the guardianship of ancient monuments. The Duke's Chambers remained under direct control of the Percys. The Office of Works undertook excavations in the moat in 1924 and removed the custodian from the gatehouse. English Heritage, who now manage and maintain the site, succeeded as the castle's custodians in 1984.

In the 20th century Nikolaus Pevsner said of the imposing castle that the military engineer happened also to be a great architect. He went on: "Warkworth must be approached from the north. With its bridge, its bridge-tower, then Bridge Street at an angle, joining the main street up a hill to the towering, sharply cut block of the keep, it is one of the most exciting sequences of views one can have in England."

Warkworth railway station was located approximately 1 mile west of the village. It was designed by Benjamin Green for the Newcastle and Berwick Railway. The station closed to passengers in 1958 and to goods traffic in 1962.

Due to Warkworth's popularity, the village caters for large numbers of visitors throughout the year. Facilities include two pubs, two hotels, a number of cafés, restaurants and tearooms, a chocolate shop and patisserie, a general store, and several galleries and boutiques.

== Governance ==
Warkworth is a major part of the electoral ward called Amble West with Warkworth. This ward stretches south to Acklington via Amble with a total population at the 2011 Census of 4,172.

== Sport ==
The village is host to Warkworth Cricket Club, formed in 1874. The first XI team plays in the Northumberland Cricket League and has reached the last 16 of the National Village Cup on several occasions in the past 20 years, and is a regular contender for the Northumberland League title, winning three years running in 2001–03. The second XI which plays in the Alnwick and District Cricket League.

The junior section has over 60 members participating in under 9-year-old competitions and under 11, 13 and 15 leagues.

== Notable people ==
- Rawdon Briggs (1853–1936), cricketer
- Sir Henry Percy, a late-medieval English nobleman. Known as Hotspur. Born in Warkworth (or Alnwick) in 1364, he led successive rebellions against Henry IV of England and was slain at the Battle of Shrewsbury in 1403.

== Gallery ==
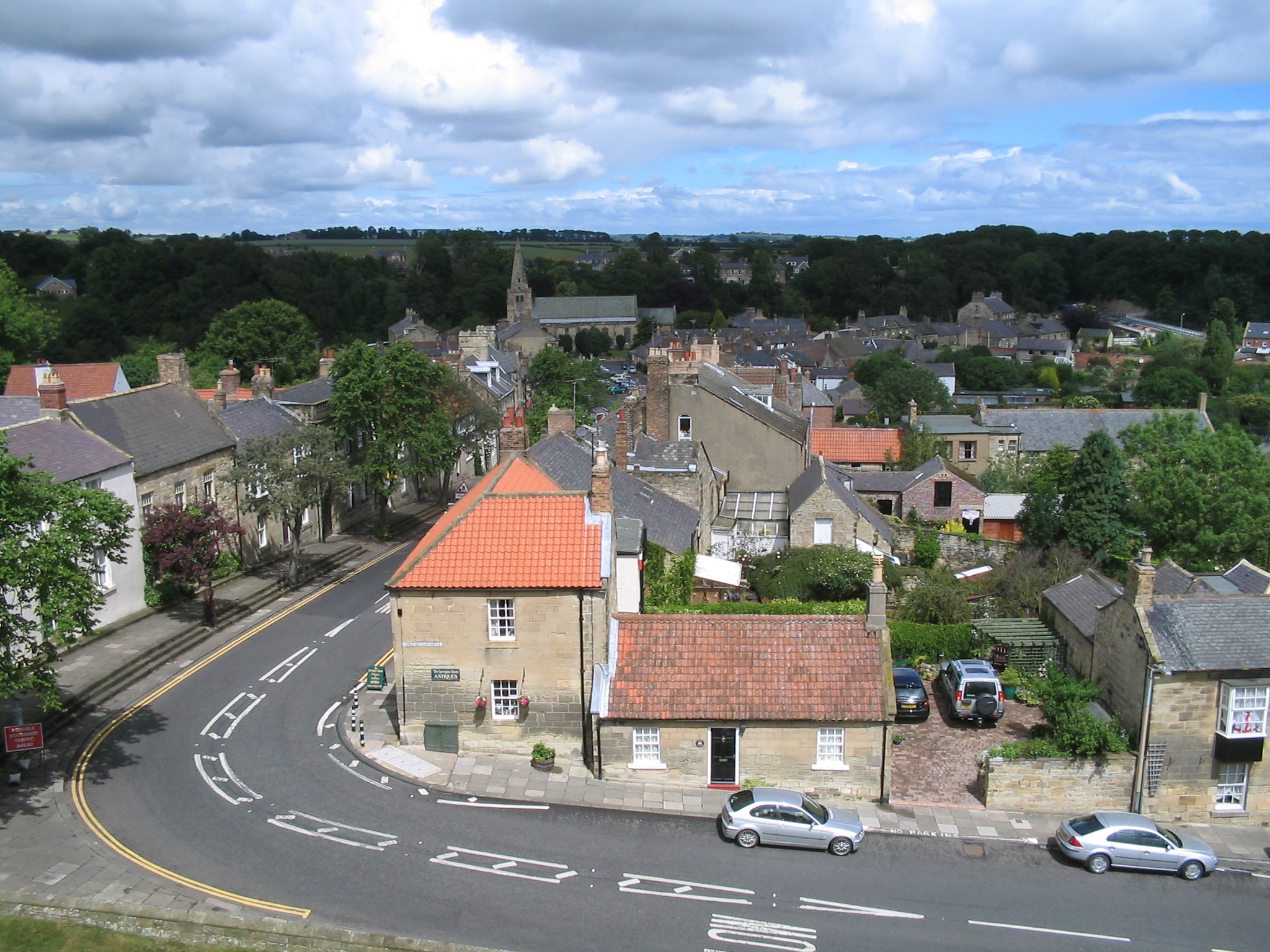
A view of the village from Warkworth Castle.

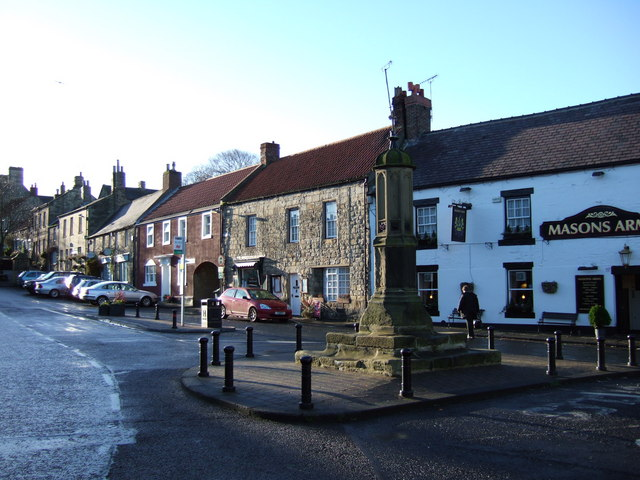
The market cross stands at the junction of the three main roads in the village.

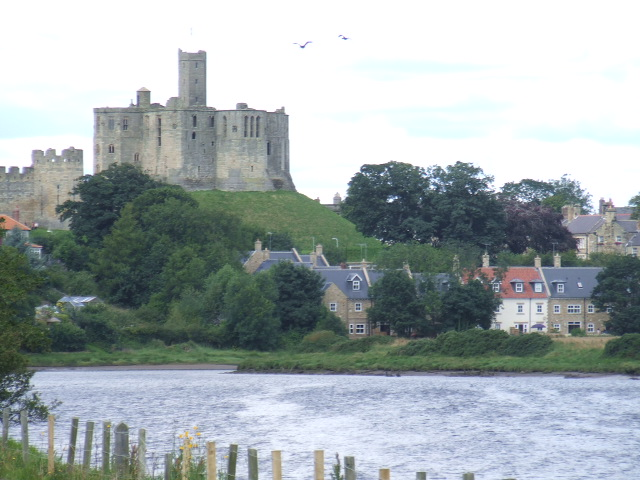
The castle stands on a hill above the village and river.

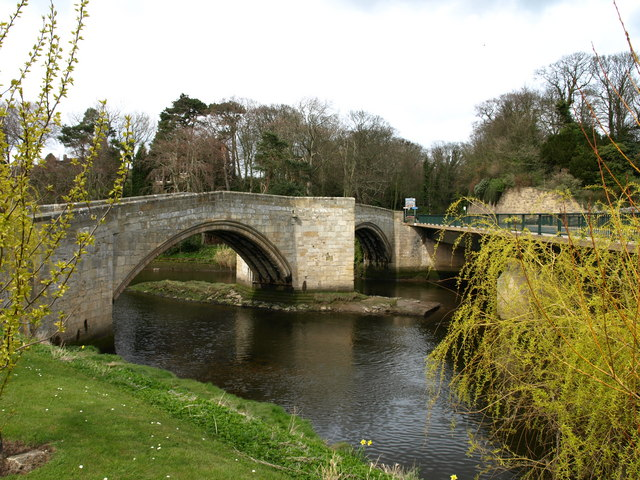
The old and new bridge across River Coquet.

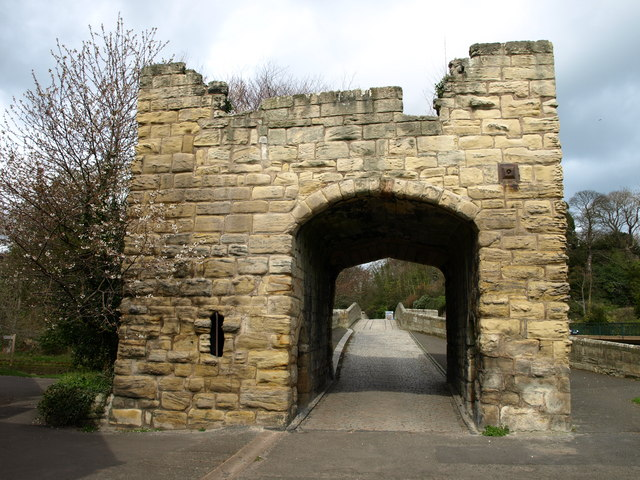
Gateway on the medieval bridge.

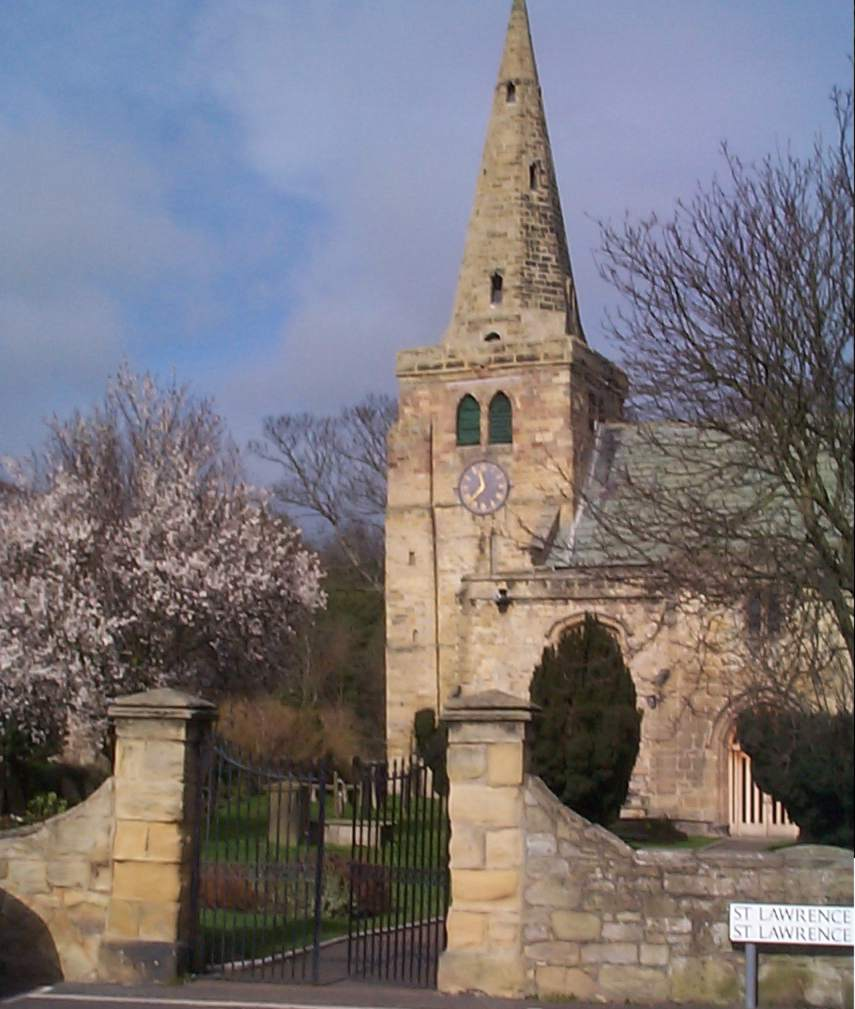
St Lawrence's Church.

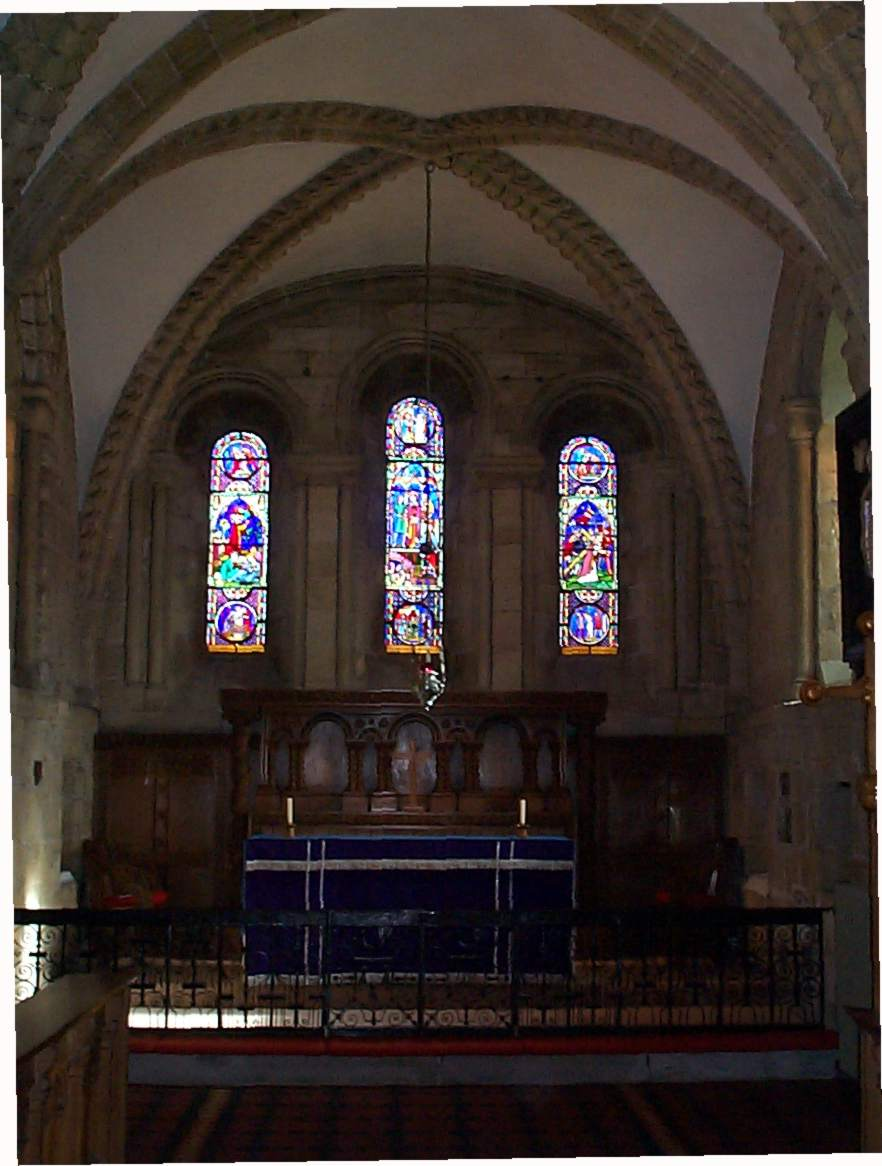
Original Norman architecture inside the church.

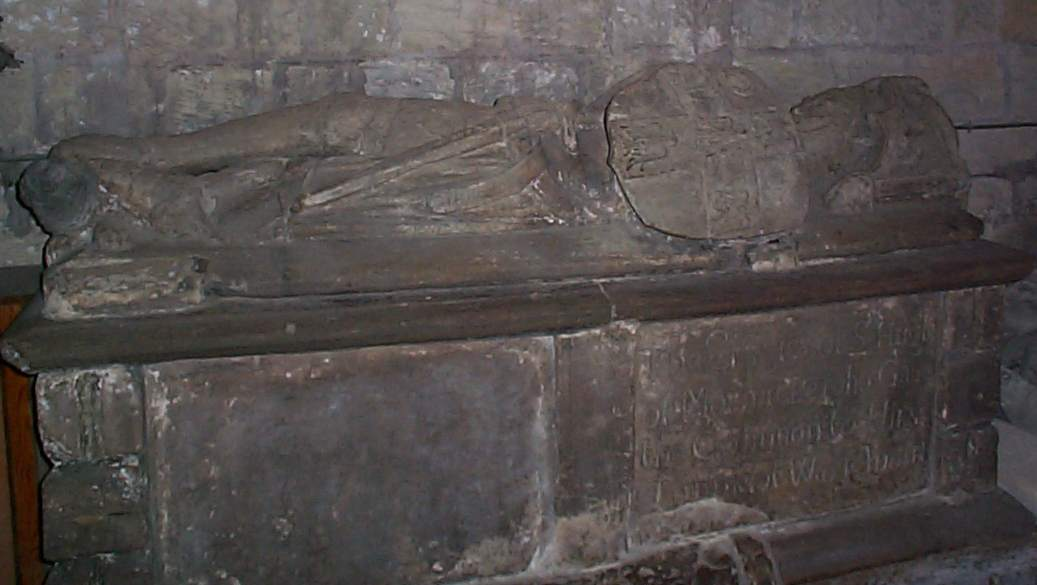
Ancient tomb inside the church.

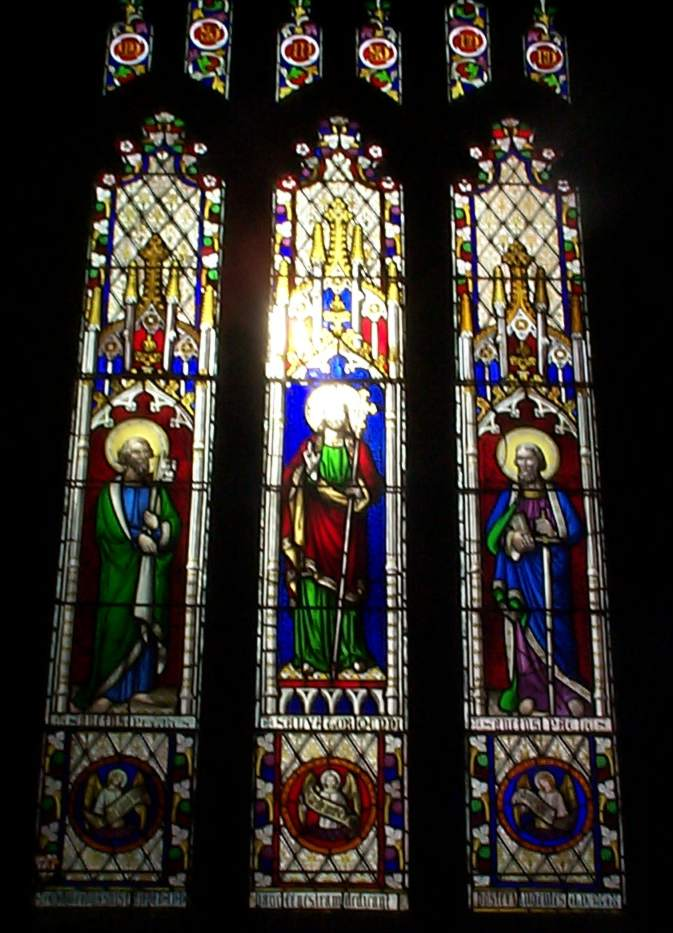
An example of the leaded windows inside the church.

== Sources ==
- Summerson, Henry (1995), Warkworth Castle, London: English Heritage, ISBN 1-85074-498-X
