= Baron of Denboig =

Title of nobility in the Baronage of Scotland

Fife

Baron of Denboig (also spelled Dunbog and Dunboig) is a title of nobility in the Baronage of Scotland in Fife.

In the medieval period the church and parish of Dunbog originally belonged to the Abbey of Arbroath in Angus. Arbroath or Aberbrothock Abbey was initially a Cluniac Priory founded by King William the Lion in 1178; later, around 1233, it was taken over by Tironsian monks from Kelso Abbey. Arbroath Abbey is famed as the site of the signing of the Declaration of Independence in 1320. Within the parish of Dunbog stood the Cistercian Priory of Cadvan, a cell of nearby Balmerino Abbey. Balmerino Abbey which lies on the shores of the River Tay, across from Dundee, was founded as a Cistercian house by the widow of King William the Lion in 1236. The only building of historical significance in modern Dunbog is Dunbog Mansion house which is built on the site of Cadvan Priory. At one point it was occupied by Cardinal David Beaton [born 1494- died 1546].

The current baron is The Much Hon. Kenneth MacLean, 14th Baron of Denboig.

== Bethune of Creich ==
Bethune of Balfour Arms

From the start of the sixteenth century until the mid-seventeenth century the lands of Dunbog were held by the family of Bethune or Beaton of Creich, members of the House of Bethune originating in France, the senior branch in Scotland being the Bethunes of Balfour.

On 2 July 1504 King James IV confirmed the sale of the lands of Dunbog and Contrahills, in the barony of Ballinbreich, to Sir David Beaton, 1st of Creich. This was confirmed on 22 November 1510, when James IV granted Sir John Beaton, 2nd of Creich, and his heirs the lands of Dunbog and Contrahills lying within the barony of Ballinbreich. On 31 December 1516, Alexander, Lord Home, sold lands in Dunbog to John Beaton of Creich. On 1 February 1530 King James V confirmed a charter granted earlier by Robert Forrester, Abbot of Balmerino, and Master Andrew Gagie of Gaduan, an annex of the said abbey, of the lands and town of Johnston lying between the lands of Balmaddy and Dunbog to Beaton of Creich.

These holdings descended through the Lairds of Creich until their estates were dispersed in the 1660s.

== The Barony of Denboig ==
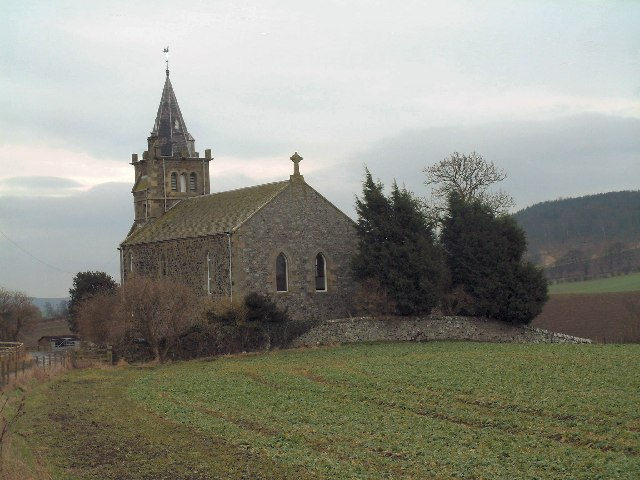
Dunbog Parish Church

On 22 March 1687 the lands of Dunbog were granted to a George Bannerman. George Bannerman was an advocate and Chamberlain of the Lordship of Fife in 1687-1689 according to the Largo Manuscript (now in the National Archives of Scotland). George Bannerman of Dunbog died by 1691 leaving a widow Elizabeth Oliphant; by 1697 Elizabeth Oliphant, widow of George Bannerman of Dunbog, had married Major Henry Balfour of Starr – latterly ’of Dunbog’. Thus Dunbog fell into the hands of the Balfours a prominent family in Fife.

=== Balfours of Denboig ===
John Balfour, 3rd Lord Balfour of Burleigh, was married in 1649 to Isabella, daughter of Sir William Balfour the Lieutenant of the Tower of London, Lord Balfour died by 27 Feb 1697. His third son was Major Henry Balfour, who was granted the lands of Starr and others on 14 August 1691 and later he was granted Dunboig and others on 27 July 1694.

Henry Balfour of Dunbog, MP for Fife, participated in the Jacobite Rising of 1715. He had previously served as a Major in the Dragoons and may have had a similar position in the Jacobite Army. There were two major battles during the '15, one at Sheriffmuir near Stirling which ended in a stalemate and the other the Siege of Preston in Lancashire where the Jacobites were surrounded by Government forces and eventually surrendered. The Jacobite Army in Preston was composed of men from the North of England supported by a contingent of Scots, mainly Highlanders. Major Balfour presumably had escaped from Preston as he was captured at Carlisle. As Balfour had committed an act of rebellion his lands including Dunbog were forfeit to the Crown.

Henry Balfour of Dunbog had married Katherine Porterfield and they had a number of children, including David, Henry, and Robert. Although Major Balfour had been a rebel and had his lands confiscated these were granted to his children in 1720 and 1728. Henry Balfour was served heir to his brothers Robert Balfour and David Balfour sons of Major Henry Balfour of Denboig, on 4 July 1730. Henry Balfour had inherited the lands and title of Dunbog, and he in turn was succeeded by his son Henry as on 11 September 1765, Henry Balfour of Dunbog was served heir to his father Henry Balfour of Dunbog, and on 10 December 1765 he was granted a charter of Dunboig. This Henry Balfour sold Dunboig to the family of Dundas in 1766. Possibly the most famous member of the Balfour family was Major General Nisbet Balfour of Dunbog (1743-1823) who fought in the American war of Independence and in the Napoleonic Wars.

=== Dundases of Denboig ===
Marquess of Zetland Arms

Thomas Dundas of Fingask, Perthshire, and his wife Bethia Baillie, daughter of John Baillie of Castlecary, Stirlingshire, had two sons namely Thomas Dundas of Fingask and Carron Hall, and Lawrence Dundas of Kerse. Lawrence, born in 1712, became Sir Lawrence Dundas baronet, a Member of Parliament for Linlithgow burghs from 1747 to 1748, a Privy Councillor in 1771, Vice Admiral of Shetland and Orkney, Commissary General and a contractor to the British Army from 1748 to 1759, was created a baronet 16 November 1762. Sir Laurence Dundas of Kerse received several grants during the 1760s and 1770s including Clackmannan in 1763 [RGS.107.7], Seabegs in 1764 [RGS.107.12], parts of Kerse in 1766 [RGS.108.181], Denboig in 1766 [RGS.108.92] Abbotskerse in 1772 [RGS.113.5], and West Kerse in 1773 [RGS.114.305]. Sir Lawrence is noted for having built the Forth and Clyde Canal, which linked east coast with the west coast, through his estates.

Sir Lawrence married Margaret Bruce, daughter of Brigadier General Alexander Bruce of Kennet, on 9 April 1738, and died 21 September 1781. He was succeeded by his only son Thomas. Sir Thomas Dundas of Kerse, baronet, was born 16 February 1741, only son of Sir Laurence Dundas of Kerse, baronet, was granted various properties in the Forth Valley in the 1780s [for example see RGS.125.60]. He was appointed Lord Lieutenant and Vice Admiral of Orkney and Shetland, served as Member of Parliament for Richmond from 1763 to 1768, and for Stirling from 1768 to 1794, on 13 August 1794 he was created Baron Dundas of Aske. He married Charlotte Fitzwilliam, born 25 July 1745, second daughter of Earl Fitzwilliam, on 14 May 1764. Sir Thomas is noted for having commissioned William Symington (1763-1831) to construct the Charlotte Dundas around 1803, as a tug for his canal, which was the world's first steamboat. He died on 14 June 1820 and was succeeded by his eldest son Lawrence.

Lawrence Dundas, born 10 April 1766, he became Lord Lieutenant and Vice Admiral of Orkney and Shetland, Lord Mayor of York, and was created Earl of Zetland on 2 July 1838. The Honourable Laurence Dundas, eldest son of Thomas, Lord Dundas, was granted Kerse on 5 July 1806. [RGS.136.164/207] He was the husband of Harriot, daughter of General John Hale. On his death on 19 February 1839 he was succeeded by his son Thomas as 2nd Earl of Zetland.

Thomas Dundas, was born on 5 February 1795, became 2nd Earl of Zetland, a Knight of the Garter, Lord Lieutenant of the North Riding of Yorkshire, and Grand Master of the Freemasons of England. Earl of Zetland sold lands at Seabegs to the Scottish Central Railway Company in 1848. He married Sophia, daughter of Sir Hedworth Williamson Baronet. The Earl died without issue on 6 May 1873 and the lands and titles went to his nephew.

Lawrence Dundas was born on 16 August 1844, he was educated at Harrow and Cambridge, he became a Knight of the Thistle, a Knight of the Garter, an MP, Lord Lieutenant of Ireland, and an army officer. In 1892 he was created Marquess of Zetland and Earl of Ronaldshay. He married Lillian, daughter of the Earl of Scarborough, and had two sons. He died 11 March 1929 and was succeeded by his elder son Lawrence. Lawrence John Lumley Dundas, 2nd Marquess of Zetland, was educated at Harrow and Cambridge, later he was an officer in the Territorial Army, a Member of Parliament, Governor of Bengal from 1917 to 1922, Secretary of State for India 1935–1940, president of a number of learned societies, Governor of the National Bank of Scotland, and a Privy Councillor.

Lawrence Aldred Mervyn Dundas, 3rd Marquess of Zetland, was born 12 November 1908 and educated at Harrow and Cambridge. During World War II he served as a Major in the British Army, later he was a prominent Freemason, and Governor of Harrow School. He married Penelope, daughter of Colonel Ebenezer Pike on 2 December 1936. He was succeeded by his son Lawrence Mark Dundas, 4th Marquess of Zetland.

== Barons of Denboig (Dunboig/Dunbog) ==
| Barons of Denboig (born and died where known/relevant) | Succeeded |
|---|---|
| Sir David Bethune, 1st of Creich (about 1462 - 1505) | 2 July 1504 |
| Sir John Bethune, 2nd of Creich (about 1485 - after 1524) | by 22 November 1510 |
| David Bethune, 3rd of Creich (about 1506 - 1539) | by 1 February 1530 |
| Robert Bethune, 4th of Creich (about 1510 - 1567) | about 1539 |
| David Bethune, 5th of Creich (about 1540 - 1579) | about 1567 |
| James Bethune, 6th of Creich (about 1545 - 1618) | about 1579 |
| David Bethune, 7th of Creich (about 1578 - before 26 Aug 1628) | about 1618 |
| David Bethune, 8th of Creich (about 1605 - 4 Mar 1660) | about 1628 |
| William Bethune, 9th of Creich (about 1610 - 1670) | about 1660 |
| George Bannerman ( - Mar 1714) | 22 March 1687 |
| Major Henry Balfour of Starr | 27 July 1694 |
| Henry Balfour | 4 July 1730 |
| Henry Balfour | 11 September 1765 |
| Henry Balfour | 10 December 1765 |
| Sir Lawrence Dundas, baronet (-21 Sep 1781) | 1766 |
| Sir Thomas Dundas of Kerse, baronet (16 Feb 1741 - 14 Jun 1820) | 1781 |
| Lawrence Dundas, 1st Earl of Zetland (10 Apr 1766 - 19 Feb 1839) | 1820 |
| Sir Thomas Dundas, 2nd Earl of Zetland (5 Feb 1795 - 6 May 1873) | 1839 |
| Sir Lawrence Dundas, 1st Marquess of Zetland and Earl of Ronaldshay (16 Aug 1844 - 11 Mar 1929) | 1873 |
| Lawrence John Lumley Dundas, 2nd Marquess of Zetland (1876 – 1971) | 1929 |
| Lawrence Aldred Mervyn Dundas, 3rd Marquess of Zetland (12 Nov 1908 - 1989) | 1971 |
| Kenneth MacLean, 14th Baron of Denboig (1954 - 2026) | |

== See also ==
- Dunbog (parish)
- The Barony of Denboig

== See also ==
- Feudalism
- Baron
- Scottish feudal barony
- Clan Maclean
- Clan Bethune
- Clan Dundas
