= Janet Beaton =

Aristocratic Scottish woman (1519–1569)

- Born: 1519; Creich, Scotland
- Died: January 1569 (aged 49-50); Scotland
- Known for: Mistress of James Hepburn, Earl of Bothwell; immortalised as Sir Walter Scott's Wizard Lady of Branxholm in his narrative poem "Lay of the Last Minstrel"
- Spouses: Sir James Crichton (m. 1538–1539) Sir Simon Preston (m. 1540–1543) Sir Walter Scott of Branxholme and Buccleuch (m. 1544–1552)
- Children: Walter Scott; David Scott; Grisel Scott; Janet Scott; Margaret Scott
- Parent(s): Sir John Beaton, 2nd Laird of Creich; Janet Hay

Janet Beaton, Lady of Branxholme and Buccleugh (1519–1569) was an aristocratic Scottish woman and a mistress of James Hepburn, Earl of Bothwell. She had a total of five husbands. One of her nieces was Mary Beaton, one of the four ladies-in-waiting of Mary, Queen of Scots, known in history as the four Marys. In her lifetime, she was accused of having been a witch. Janet was immortalised as Sir Walter Scott's Wizard Lady of Branxholm in his celebrated narrative poem "Lay of the Last Minstrel".

== Family ==
Janet was born in 1519, one of the eleven children of Sir John Beaton, 2nd Laird of Creich and Janet Hay, daughter of John Hay, provost of Dundee by his wife Elizabeth Crichton. Her father was the hereditary keeper of Falkland Palace. Her brother was Robert Beaton, 4th Laird of Creich, and her sister, Elizabeth Beaton was a mistress of King James V of Scotland, by whom she had an illegitimate daughter, Jean Stewart. Her niece was Mary Beaton, one of the celebrated ladies-in-waiting of Mary, Queen of Scots, known as "the four Marys". Janet was also related to Cardinal David Beaton and Mary's ambassador to France, James Beaton, Archbishop of Glasgow.

== Marriages and children ==
Janet married her first husband, Sir James Crichton of Cranston Riddell in 1538 when she was nineteen years of age. In 1540, a year after Sir James's death, she married Sir Simon Preston of Craigmillar Castle; they were divorced in 1543 on grounds of consanguinity and her own admitted adultery with her future third husband. Sometime before June 1544 Janet married, as his third wife, Sir Walter Scott of Branxholme and Buccleuch, Chief of the Clan Scott (1495- 4 October 1552), by whom she had five children:

- Walter Scott
- David Scott
- Grisel Scott (born 1552), married firstly, William Borthwick, 6th Lord Borthwick (d. 1599), by whom she had five sons; she married secondly, Walter Cairncross.
- Janet Scott, married in 1565 firstly John Cranstoun of Cranstoun, by whom she had issue; she married secondly, Robert Scott of Haining.
- Margaret Scott, said to have married Robert Scott of Thirlestane, by whom she had issue.

In 1550, Janet's husband Walter Scott was appointed Warden of the Middle March and the following year, Warden and Justiciar of Liddesdale. On 4 October 1552 he was killed in a skirmish in Edinburgh's High Street with members of his clan's rivals, the Clan Kerr who ran him through with swords.

Janet Beaton had rights over the mills in Musselburgh inherited from her first husband. During the war of the Rough Wooing the mills were damaged by an English sympathiser, an "assured Scot", Peter Durie from Saltoun. Beaton was awarded compensation for her losses in 1554 and Durie was executed.

In 1558, Janet marched at the head of an armed party consisting of two hundred members of her clan to the Kirk of St. Mary of the Lowes in Yarrow, where she knocked down the doors in an attempt to apprehend Sir Peter Cranstoun. Janet was brought before the Justice; however a warrant issued by the regent Marie of Guise brought the proceedings against her to a halt.

Janet had a total of five husbands.

== Affair with Bothwell ==
Janet had many love affairs throughout her life, the most significant of these began sometime around the year 1558 with James Hepburn, Earl of Bothwell. He was twenty-four at the time and she was almost forty. Janet was described as having possessed "an unfading beauty", combined with audacity, determination and sexuality. Her ageless beauty was attributed to Janet's practice of sorcery, and it was rumoured that she and Bothwell may have gone through a form of "hand-fasting" ceremony.

Janet Beaton was immortalised by Sir Walter Scott in his narrative poem "Lay of the Last Minstrel" as Wizard Lady of Branxholm, who could '"bond to her bidding the viewless forms of air". Bothwell would go on to marry in 1566 Lady Jean Gordon a wealthy Highlander heiress, the sister of the 5th Earl of Huntly; immediately following his divorce from Jean in 1567, he became the third husband of Queen Mary of Scotland.

In 1567, following the murder of Henry Stuart, Lord Darnley, Janet Beaton's name was written on a placard in Edinburgh accusing her of having used witchcraft to influence the queen in consenting to her second husband's murder by Bothwell and the other conspirators. The same sorcery perpetrated by Janet was allegedly used against Queen Mary which caused her to become enamoured of Earl Bothwell. At Dunbar Castle, Janet was one of the three attendants of Queen Mary following the latter's abduction by Bothwell. The other two women were Bothwell's widowed sister, Jean Hepburn, and Janet's younger sister Margaret Beaton.

Janet Beaton died in January 1568/9.

Janet's sister Margaret Beaton, born about 1526, married Arthur Forbes, 4th Laird of Rires in the parish of Kilconquhar and had two sons with him before his death in 1586. She was one of the ladies of Mary, Queen of Scots. When the queen had gone into labour with her son James VI and I on 19 June 1566, by the magic of the Countess Atholl, Margaret bore her pains by proxy. She may have acted as wet-nurse to the future king.
