= Janet Scott, Lady Ferniehirst =

Jean Scott
- Born: 1548
- Died: Unknown
- Occupation: landowner
- Known for: ending a family feud
- Spouse: Thomas Kerr of Ferniehirst
- Children: Robert Carr, 1st Earl of Somerset et al

Janet or Jean Scott, Lady Ferniehirst (c. 1548 – after 1593) was a Scottish landowner. She was a member of the Border family of Scott who succumbed to an arranged marriage that healed the feud with the family who killed her father. Her marriage to Thomas Kerr of Ferniehirst was successful and she took a role in Scottish politics between the Scottish court and the exiled Mary, Queen of Scots.

== Origin ==
Scott was the daughter of Sir William Scott of Kirkurd, Younger of Buccleuch (died 1552). Her brother was Walter Scott, 4th Baron of Buccleuch. They were the grandchildren of Walter Scott, 3rd of Buccleuch (who was murdered on 4 October 1552, having been pre-deceased by his son). Her mother was Grisel, second daughter of John Betoun of Creich.

== Life ==
Her brother succeeded his grandfather at age three and her uncle, Walter Scott of Goldielands, a natural half-brother of her father, led the Scott family during his minority.

In 1565 an agreement was made with the family who had killed his father. It was agreed that there would be a number of marriages between the family members to end the feud. Despite the good intentions none of the marriages took place, but this was an important basis for her later marriage.

In 1569 she married the widower Thomas Kerr bridging the feud between the families. A dowry was agreed but at least £1,000 was not paid in Scott's lifetime. The feud with the Scott family was over but her life was not peaceful. In the year of her marriage an English army demolished the Kerr family seat of Ferniehirst Castle.

Her husband was involved helping William Kirkcaldy of Grange who tried to hold Edinburgh Castle in the name of Mary the exiled Queen during the Marian Civil War and in 1573 he had to go into exile abroad. She and her husband were thought to have lent money to Grange against the security of the jewels of Mary, Queen of Scots. When Robert Melville was questioned about Mary's jewels, he said he did not know which pieces, if any, were held by Jean Scott, but her "great friend", Margaret Learmonth, Grange's wife, would know.

In July 1575 he wrote from Paris to Mary, Queen of Scots, describing the destruction of his houses with fire and gunpowder by English forces during the Marian Civil War costing him at least 20,000 crowns, and the injuries sustained by his family and followers fighting for her cause in Scotland. He had lost his jewels and the charters of his lands left in a coffer in Edinburgh Castle which Regent Morton confiscated in 1573. The Earl of Angus cut down his woodlands.

In 1578, when one of the servants of Mary, Queen of Scots, in England, Mademoiselle Rallay, was old and wished to retire, Mary thought of employing Janet Scott's young daughter in her place. Queen Elizabeth would not allow this. Probably, it was thought the girl might become another conduit for Mary's secret correspondence.

Thomas Kerr, laird of Ferniehirst, returned to Scotland in 1581 but left again by 1583. Janet was given power of attorney over her husband's business affairs in Scotland and France and she ran them during the 1580s.

A cipher key exists for Lady Ferniehirst's correspondence with Mary, Queen of Scots, in England. In October 1583 she wrote to Mary, Queen of Scots from Ferniehirst with news from the Scottish court. She said she had been approached by the Countess of Arran in person and by letter hoping that Mary would not join with the Hamiltons against her husband James Stewart, Earl of Arran. She wanted Mary to advise her about this. She had forgotten to forward a letter from Lord Seton. Mary was a godparent to one of her sons. Lord Seton passed some of his letters to Lady Ferniehirst for her to address and forward to Mary, as he thought this would deflect suspicion. Mary had sent her a ring as a token. She received the queen's letter and the ring from her son, and she hoped to speak with the bearer of the letter who would have personal news from Mary.

In February 1584 she hosted six Englishmen at Ferniehirst. Two of them, calling themselves Foljambe and Tunstead, were fugitives sent by Mary, Queen of Scots, who had arrived Scotland in January by "a very wild and dangerous passage", and they stayed in the tower for fear of being captured and returned to England. Two of Lady Ferniehirst's servants escorted the pair to Seton Palace and they met the king at his hunting, and then went north to Huntly Castle. The English ambassador Robert Bowes heard that one man was really Sir Thomas Gerard of Bryn (who was involved in the Babington Plot).

The Laird of Ferniehirst made preparations for a border meeting in July 1585, and needing to have an ensign or flag made, used one of his wife's skirts.

Lady Ferniehirst formed a good relationship with Anne of Denmark. In December 1591 she persuaded her to intercede with James VI to allow the exiled Laird of Buccleuch to return to Scotland.

== Children ==
Her husband's children when they married were

- Andrew Kerr of Ferniehirst, called Lord Jedburgh. At the marriage of the "young laird Farnieherst", Andrew Kerr, to Anne Stewart, daughter of Andrew Master of Ochiltree and Margaret Stewart in January 1585 the king's bed caught fire.
- Mary Kerr
- Julian Kerr, who married (1) Patrick Hume of Polwarth, (2) Thomas Hamilton, 1st Earl of Haddington
- Margaret Kerr

Her children with Sir Thomas Kerr of Ferniehirst included:

- James Kerr
- Thomas Kerr
- Anne Kerr, who married John Elphinstone, 2nd Lord Balmerino
- Robert Carr, 1st Earl of Somerset, who married Frances Carr, Countess of Somerset, their daughter was Anne Russell, Countess of Bedford

== Portrait ==
A portrait survives of Janet Scott dated 1593 by an unknown artist. She wears black mourning clothes, with a pearl chain and pearl girdle. The portrait is in the collection of the Duke of Buccleuch and Queensberry.
