= Scheduled monuments in Fife =

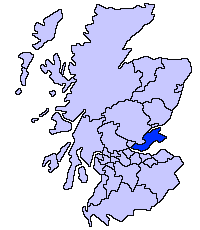
Fife shown within Scotland

A scheduled monument in Scotland is a nationally important archaeological site or monument which is given legal protection by being placed on a list (or "schedule") maintained by Historic Environment Scotland. The aim of scheduling is to preserve the country's most significant sites and monuments as far as possible in the form in which they have been inherited.

The process of scheduling is governed by the Ancient Monuments and Archaeological Areas Act 1979, which aims "to make provision for the investigation, preservation and recording of matters of archaeological or historical interest". The term "scheduled monument" can apply to the whole range of archaeological sites which have been deliberately constructed by human activity but are not always visible above ground. They range from prehistoric standing stones and burial sites, through Roman remains and medieval structures such as castles and monasteries, to later structures such as industrial sites and buildings constructed for the World Wars. Some buildings or structures which were both scheduled and listed have had their listing designations removed to reduce the duplication.

In 2017 there were 8238 scheduled monuments in Scotland.

== Notable Scheduled Monuments in Fife ==
Name	Location	Description	Ref No	Image
Norman's Law hillfort	Dunbog	Remains of iron age hill fort	SM814	
MacDuff's Castle	Wemyss	Ruined 14th-century castle, dovecote and caves	SM817	
Abdie Old Kirk	Abdie	Roofless ruin consecrated in 1242	SM825	
Balmerino Abbey	Balmerino	Ruined 1227 Cistercian abbey	SM827	
Lindores Abbey	Newburgh	Remains of 12th-century Tironensian abbey	SM836	
Ardross Castle	Elie	Remains of 15th-century square tower	SM841	
Ballinbreich Castle	Flisk	Ruined major courtyard castle.	SM844	
Collairnie Castle	Dunbog	Ruined L-plan tower-house	SM847	
Creich Castle	Creich	Ruined L-plan tower-house	SM848	
Denmylne Castle	Newburgh	Ruined tower house	SM852	
Falkland Palace	Falkland	Royal palace (excluding South Range and stables)	SM854	
Newark castle	St Monance	Ruined castle and dovecote	SM866	
Culross Palace	Culross	15th/16th-century merchant's house	SM5288	
Balgonie Castle	Markinch	Courtyard buildings surrounding unscheduled tower-house	SM6411	
Culross Abbey	Culross	Remains of medieval abbey	SM13334	
Aberdour Castle	Aberdour	Substantial ruins of castle and dovecot	SM90002	
Dunfermline Abbey	Dunfermline	Ruined abbey buildings, including the ruined palace, but excluding the abbey church	SM90116	
Ravenscraig Castle	Kirkcaldy	Remains of promontary castle	SM90244	
St Andrews Castle	St Andrews	Ruined medieval and Renaissance style castle	SM90259	

== See also ==
- List of Category A listed buildings in Fife
