= Walter Scott, 4th Baron of Buccleuch =

Head of the Scottish Border family of Scott

Arms of Scott of Buccleuch: Or, on a bend azure a mullet of six points between two crescents of the first

Walter Scott, 4th Baron of Buccleuch (1549–1574) was head of the Border family of Scott and, despite his youth, played a prominent part in the turbulent politics of 16th century Scotland.

== Origin ==
Scott was the eldest son of Sir William Scott of Kirkurd, Younger of Buccleuch (died 1552) and his sister was Jean Scott, Lady Ferniehirst. They were the grandchildren of Walter Scott, 3rd of Buccleuch (who was murdered on 4 October 1552, having been pre-deceased by his son). His mother was Grisel, second daughter of John Betoun of Creich.

== Career ==
Scott succeeded his grandfather at age three. His uncle, Walter Scott of Goldielands, a natural half-brother of his father, led the Scotts during his minority.

In 1565 an agreement was made with the family who had killed his father. It was agreed that there would be a number of marriages between the family members to end the feud. Despite the good intentions none of the agreements took place, but this was an important basis for the later marriage of his sister in 1569.

On 24 March 1566, Queen Mary appointed him captain of Newark Castle, Selkirkshire, whereupon he supported her with a force of over 3,000 men. In January 1570 (in reliance upon the distraction likely to be caused by the assassination of the Regent Moray, of which he had advance knowledge), he engaged in depredations on the English side of the Border. By way of retaliation the English, under the Earl of Sussex and Lord Scrope, destroyed his stronghold at Branxholme Castle. Scott rebuilt the castle in the following year.

In 1569 his sister Jean married the widower Sir Thomas Kerr bridging the feud between the families. A dowry was agreed but at least £1,000 was not paid in Scott's lifetime.

He was a principal leader of the raid to Stirling on 4 September 1571, when an attempt was made to seize the Regent Lennox, who was slain by one of the Hamiltons during the mêlée. Buccleuch, who had interposed to save the Regent Morton, his kinsman, whom the Hamiltons intended also to have slain, was during the retreat taken prisoner by Morton, and was for some time confined in Doune Castle in Menteith.

Scott was made Keeper and Captain of the royal Newark Castle, and Baillie and Chamberlain of Ettrick Forest in December 1573.

Scott died at Branxholme on 17 April 1574.

== Family ==
Scott married Margaret Douglas, daughter of David Douglas, 7th Earl of Angus. (She survived him and married secondly Francis Stewart, 5th Earl of Bothwell.) They had three children:

- Walter Scott, later 1st Lord Scott of Buccleuch
- Margaret (sometimes, though doubtfully, said to be married to Robert Scott of Thirlestane)
- Mary, who married William Elliott of Lariston
