= John Beaton of Creich =

Scottish landowner and courtier

John Beaton of Creich (born 1495) was a Scottish landowner and courtier.

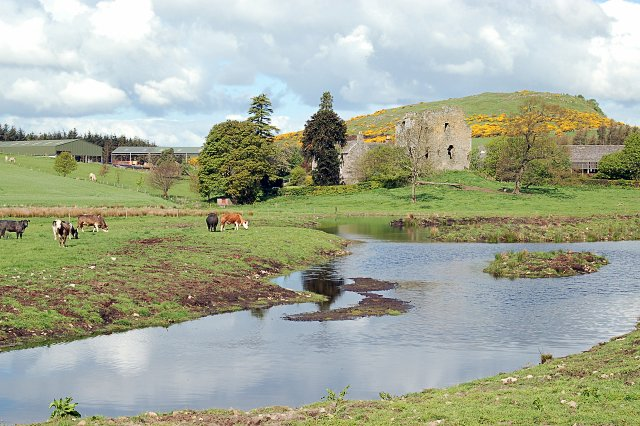
Creich Castle

His father, David Beaton, (1466-1505) was treasurer of Scotland for James IV. His mother was Jean Duddingston.

His home was Creich Castle. His surname was also spelled "Bethune" or "Betoun".

Beaton was the keeper of Falkland Palace. His sister Elizabeth Beaton was a mistress of James V of Scotland.

Another sister Janet Beaton was the second wife of James Hamilton, 1st Earl of Arran.

In 1526 Beaton was involved in the murder of John Grief. In 1530 he bought the lands of Dunbog from the Earl of Rothes.

== Marriage and family ==
He married Janet Hay, a daughter of John Hay, Provost of Dundee. Their eleven children included:

- Janet Beaton (1519–1569)
- Robert Beaton of Creich (d. 1567)
- Christian Beaton, who married Michael Balfour of Burleigh (d. 1577)
- Margaret Beaton, who married Arthur Forbes of Reres (d. 1586), and was a companion of Mary, Queen of Scots, known as "Lady Reres"
- Grisel Beaton, who married (1) William Scott of Kirkurd, younger of Buccleuch, (2) Andrew Murray of Black Barony. Regent Arran contributed to her dowry. She was the mother of Walter Scott, 4th Baron of Buccleuch, Janet Scott, Lady Ferniehirst, and Gideon Murray.
