= Robert Beaton of Creich =

Scottish landowner and courtier

Robert Beaton of Creich (died 1567) was a Scottish landowner and courtier. He served as a Master of Household to Mary, Queen of Scots.

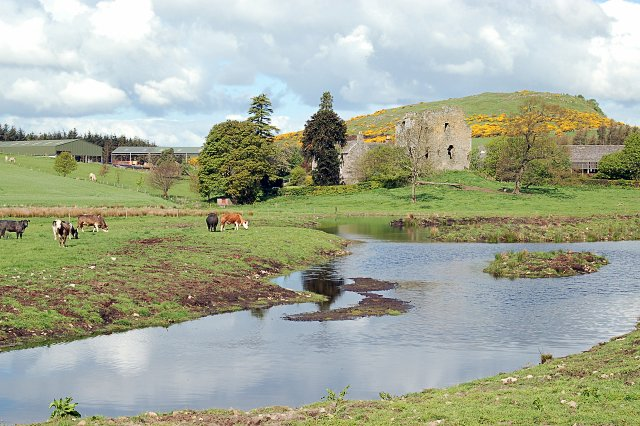
Creich Castle

== Career ==
Robert Beaton was a son of John Beaton of Creich, keeper of Falkland Palace and Janet Hay. He went to France with Mary, Queen of Scots in 1548.

His homes in Scotland included Creich Castle and the Place of Dunbog. He was extremely well-connected through his sisters and aunts.

Robert's older sister, Janet Beaton married James Crichton of Cranston Riddel, and secondly Simon Preston of Craigmillar Castle. In 1543 she divorced him to marry Walter Scott of Buccleuch. He was killed in a feud on Edinburgh's High Street in 1552, and she was later associated with the Earl of Bothwell.

Another sister, Margaret Beaton, married Arthur Forbes of Reres (d. 1586), and was known as "Lady Reres". She was also a companion of the queen. Rires Castle was in Kilconquhar, Fife.

Another sister, Grisel Beaton, married William Scott, younger of Buccleuch, and secondly in 1552 Andrew Murray of Blackbarony, and was the mother of Gideon Murray.

His aunt, Janet Beaton, was the second wife of James Hamilton, 1st Earl of Arran. Another aunt, Elizabeth Beaton was a mistress of James V of Scotland. They had a daughter, Jean Stewart, who married Archibald Campbell, 5th Earl of Argyll. Elizabeth later married John Stewart, Lord Innermeath, and was the mother of James Stewart, 5th Lord Innermeath and the poet John Stewart of Baldynneis.

The Laird of Creich and Alexander Forrester of Torwood were both in Paris in October 1560 and carried letters from the English ambassador Nicholas Throckmorton to William Cecil in London.

He was one of the supper guests at Holyrood Palace in March 1566 when conspirators murdered David Rizzio.

Robert Beaton of Creich died in May 1567, after making his will with his wife Jeanne de la Rainville at Falkland Palace.

== Marriage and family ==
In May 1539 Robert Beaton married Jeanne de la Rainville, or Delareynveil (d. 1576). She was a French lady-in-waiting to Mary of Guise. Her name at that time seems also to be recorded as "Jehanne Gresmor" or "Gresoner", and "Dame Joanna Renwall alias Grysoner". Perhaps adding to confusion, it seems that both mother and daughter were members of the household of Mary of Guise. "Madame Gresinor" made passementerie from gold thread.

James V gave Jeanne a dowry (a "tocher") and bought her a red velvet gown and a white velvet kirtle or skirt lined with yellow taffeta. James V bought a coat for her brother. The wedding was held at St Andrews. The royal wardrobe servant George Steill bound up twelve tapestries with scenes of the History of Aeneas with cords and carried them from Edinburgh to decorate the venue, and the King's tailor Thomas Arthur sent his servant to St Andrews with a length of red "cramoisy" velvet for her gown and white velvet for a kirtle. The clothes were finished by the "French tailor" at court.

Jeanne Delareynveil died at the Place of Dunbog in 1576. Their children included:

- David Beaton of Creich, who married Beatrix Leslie, daughter of George Leslie, 4th Earl of Rothes of Ballinbreich Castle.
- James Beaton of Creich, Parson of Old Roxburghe. who married Helen Leslie of Kinnaird, Fife, widow of the Edinburgh merchant James Baron and James Kirkcaldy (d. 1573) brother of William Kirkcaldy of Grange, and secondly married Margaret Wemyss daughter of David Wemyss of Wemyss Castle.
- Mary Beaton, companion of Mary, Queen of Scots, who married Alexander Ogilvy of Boyne.
- Lucrece or Lucretia Beaton, a maid of honour in the household of Mary, Queen of Scots, in 1562, who married (1) David Beaton of Melgund, (2) Andrew Wishart of Mylneden.
- Elizabeth Beaton, who married James Sandilands of St Monans.
- Christian Beaton.
- Anna Beaton.
