= Ardross Castle, Fife =

Ruined castle in Scotland

Ardross Castle
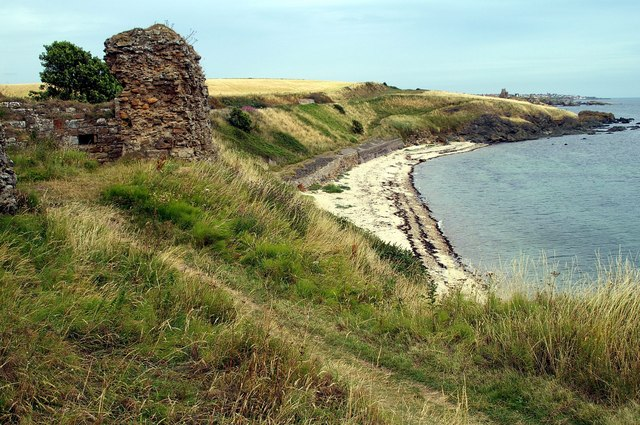
- Ruins of Ardoss Castle
- Interactive map of Ardross Castle
- 56.19627°N 2.79381°W
- Type: Castle
- Location: Dunfermline, Scotland
- OS grid reference: NO 50841 00690

Site notes
- Material: Stone
- Condition: Ruined
- Public access: Yes

Scheduled monument
- Official name: Ardross Castle
- Designated: 28 August 1937
- Reference no.: SM841

Ardross Castle was a c.14th-century castle that was located in Elie and Earlsferry, Fife, Scotland, near the sea.

== History ==
The Dishington family built the castle, but sold it to Sir William Scott of Elie in 1607. At the end of the 17th century is passed to Sir William Anstruther.

== Structure ==
The castle is in ruins, with the vaulted basement visible above ground, along with the ruins of a later block.

== See also ==
- Scheduled monuments in Fife
