= The Lay of the Last Minstrel =

1805 poem by Walter Scott

- by Sir Walter Scott
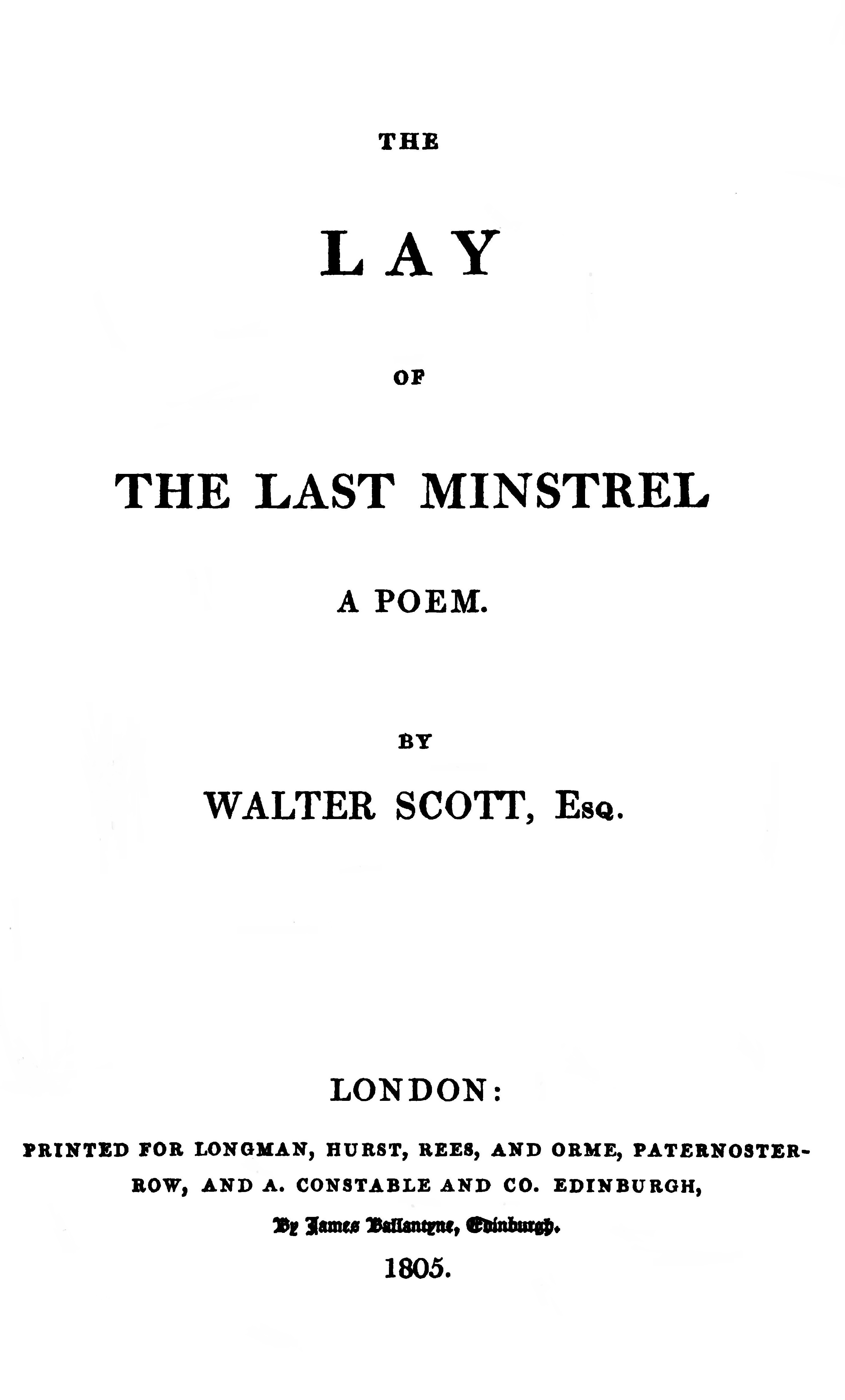
- First edition title page
- Written: 1802-1804
- Country: Scotland
- Form: Narrative
- Meter: Iambic tetrameter
- Publisher: Archibald Constable and Co., Edinburgh; Longman, Hurst, Rees, and Orme, London
- Publication date: 12 January 1805
- Preceded by: Minstrelsy of the Scottish Border
- Followed by: Marmion

Full text
- The Lay of the Last Minstrel at Wikisource

The Lay of the Last Minstrel (1805) is a narrative poem in six cantos with copious antiquarian notes by Walter Scott. Set in the Scottish Borders in the mid-16th century, it is represented within the work as being sung by a minstrel late in the 1600s.

== Background ==
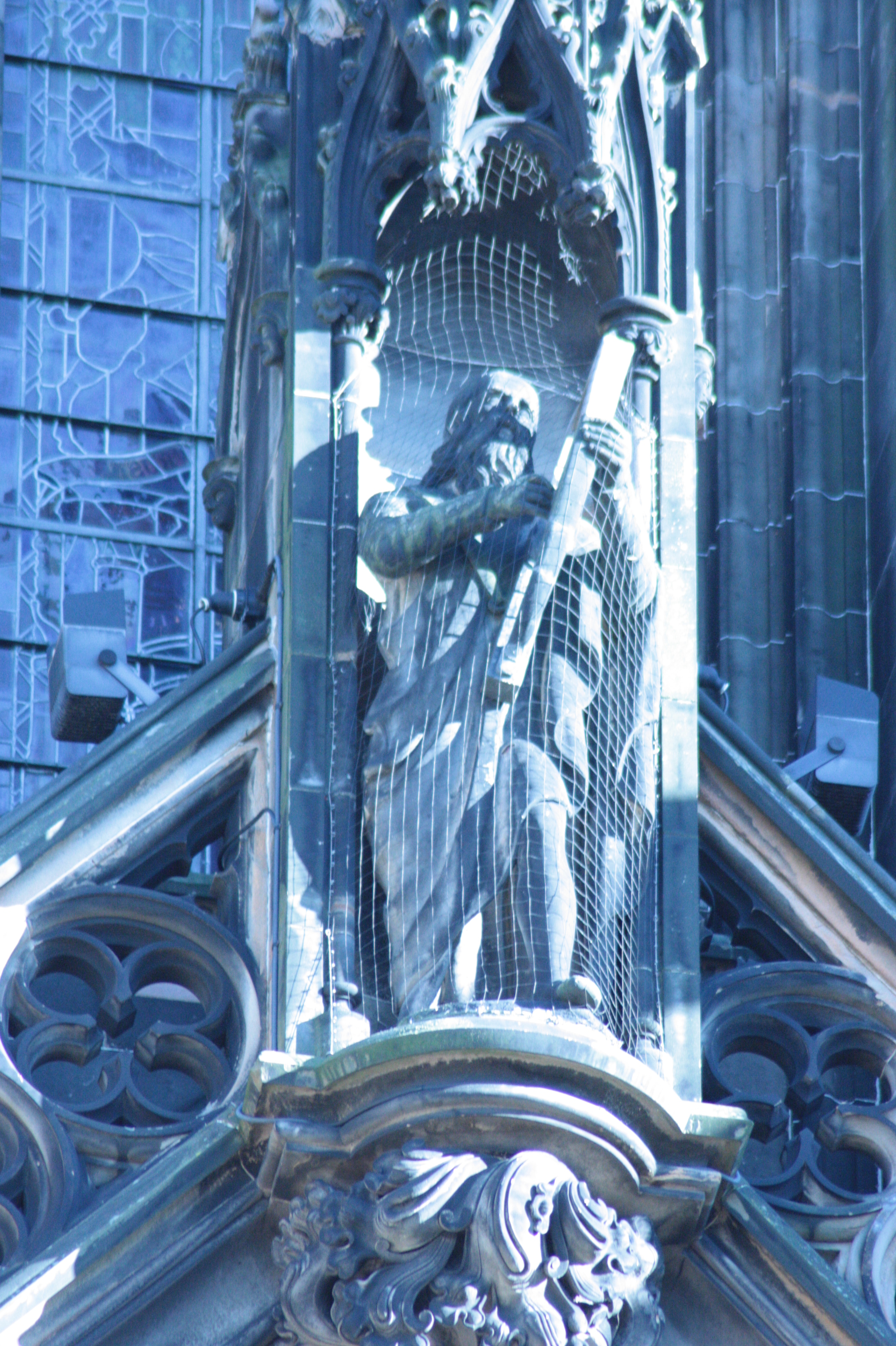
The Harp of the North from The Lay of the Last Minstrel, Scott Monument, Edinburgh

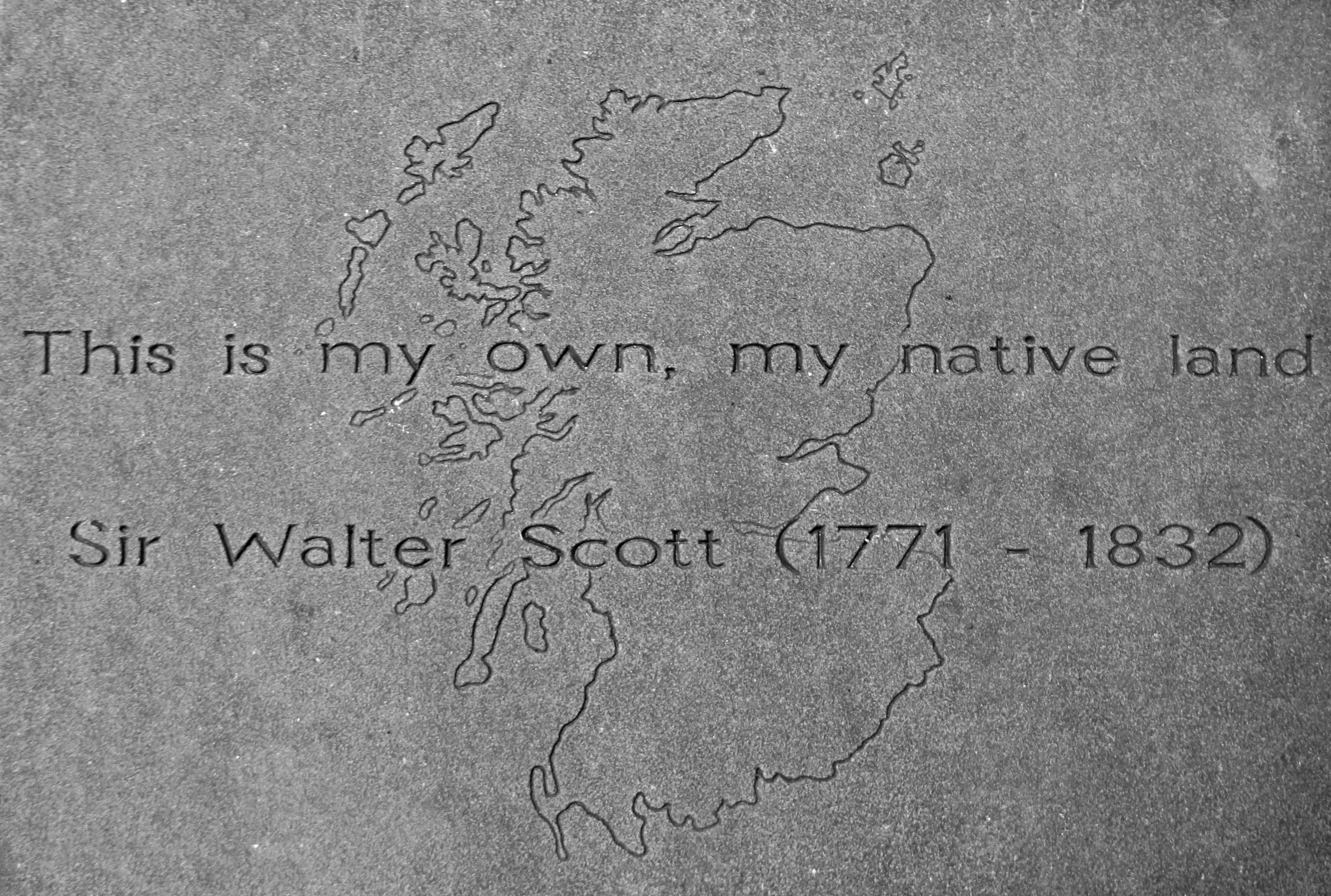
"This is my own, my native land" quoted from The Lay of the Last Minstrel on Walter Scott's stone slab at the Makars' Court outside The Writers' Museum in Edinburgh

Towards the end of 1802 Scott planned to include a long original poem of his own in the second edition of his edited collection Minstrelsy of the Scottish Border: it would be 'a sort of Romance of Border Chivalry & inchantment'. He owed the distinctive irregular accentual four-beat metre to Coleridge's Christabel, which he had heard recited by John Stoddart (it was not to be published until 1816). Scott tells how he showed the opening stanzas to his friends William Erskine and George Cranstoun, and believing that they had not approved, destroyed the manuscript. Some time later one of the friends indicated that they had been puzzled rather than disapproving and Scott proceeded, introducing the figure of the minstrel as intermediary between the period of the action and the present. The first canto was written while Scott was recovering from being kicked by a horse during a practice charge on Portobello sands. The figure of Gilpin Horner was included at the suggestion of the Countess of Dalkeith, though it is not certain at what stage. The third canto at least was finished by July 1803, and the whole poem was complete by August 1804.

== Editions ==
The Lay of the Last Minstrel was published in Edinburgh by Archibald Constable and Co. on 12 January 1805, and by Longman, Hurst, Rees, and Orme in London on the 24th. The price was £1 5s (£1.25) and the print-run 750. A second edition of 1500 copies appeared in October and further editions individual and collected followed until 1830 when Scott provided a substantial new Introduction. In August and November 1806 he had made substantial additions for the fourth and fifth editions.

A critical edition will appear as Volume 1 of The Edinburgh Edition of Walter Scott's Poetry to be published by Edinburgh University Press.

== Preface ==
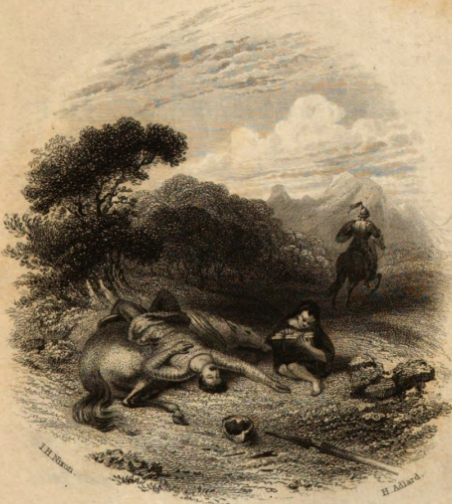
The lay of the last minstrel - by Sir Walter Scott, Illustrated by James Henry Nixon

"The Poem, now offered to the Public, is intended to illustrate the customs and manners which anciently prevailed on the Borders of England and Scotland. ...As the description of scenery and manners was more the object of the Author than a combined and regular narrative, the plan of the Ancient Metrical Romance was adopted, which allows greater latitude, in this respect, than would be consistent with the dignity of a regular Poem. ...For these reasons, the Poem was put into the mouth of an ancient Minstrel, the last of the race, who, as he is supposed to have survived the Revolution, might have caught somewhat of the refinement of modern poetry, without losing the simplicity of his original model. The date of the Tale itself is about the middle of the sixteenth century, when most of the personages actually flourished. The time occupied by the action is Three Nights and Three Days."

== Plot ==
An aging minstrel seeks hospitality at Newark Castle and in recompense tells his hostess, Duchess of Buccleuch, and her ladies a tale of a sixteenth-century Border feud. In the poem, Lady Margaret Scott of Buccleuch, the "Flower of Teviot", is beloved by Baron Henry of Cranstoun, an ally of the Ker Clan, but a deadly feud exists between the two border clans of Scott and Carr/Ker, which has resulted in the recent murder of Lady Margaret's father, Sir Walter Scott of Buccleuch, by the Kers on the High Street in Edinburgh. Margaret's widowed mother hates the Ker clan as a result, and is adamant in refusing her consent to any suggestion of marriage between the lovers until Henry's brave conduct results in the restoration of her young son from captivity and induces her to change her mind.

The poem is concerned with loyalty to one's homeland, but also with the manner in which the poet draws his art from his connection to his country and traditions.

== Canto summary ==
Introduction: At the end of the 17th century a destitute minstrel is offered hospitality by the Duchess of Buccleuch at Newark Tower and sings the following lay:

Canto 1: Lady Scott of Branksome, widow of Sir Walter Scott, dispatches the moss-trooper William of Deloraine to fetch a scroll or book from a tomb in Melrose Abbey.

Canto 2: Deloraine retrieves a mighty book from Michael Scott's tomb with the help of the monk who had buried it. Back at Branksome the Lady's daughter Margaret slips out at dawn to meet her beloved Henry of Cranstoun, with whose clan the Scotts are at feud. They part when Henry's goblin page Gilpin Horner warns of approaching danger.

Canto 3: Attacked by the returning Deloraine, Henry wounds him and asks Horner (who has taken possession of the magic book) to escort him to the castle for attention. Horner entices the Lady's young son into the woods before abandoning him: the boy is taken captive by Lord Dacre's men. The Lady tends Deloraine, and a lighted beacon warns of the approach of hostile forces.

Canto 4: The English forces under Dacre and Howard, arrive at Branksome with young Buccleuch. They demand that Deloraine be handed over to them to suffer for Border treason and agree with the Lady that her son's fate should be determined by single combat between Deloraine and his enemy Richard Musgrave.

Canto 5: A large Scottish force arrives and the two armies observe a truce in anticipation of the combat. Horner causes Henry to resemble a Scottish knight to facilitate a meeting with Margaret. Musgrave is killed in the combat, but it turns out that Henry has taken Deloraine's place. The Lady withdraws her opposition to the marriage of Henry and Margaret. Deloraine nobly laments Musgrave's death.

Canto 6: During the celebration of the marriage Horner creates mischief. Three minstrels entertain the company: Albert Græme from the Debateable Land sings of love fatally frustrated by national rivalry; the English Fitztraver recalls the fate of the Earl of Surrey, lover of Geraldine, at the hands of Henry VIII; and Harold from Orkney laments the loss at sea of lovely Rosabelle. Michael Scott reclaims Horner with apocalyptic fury, and the humbled company turn to penitence and prayers for the departed.

== Reception ==
The critical reception of The Lay was almost entirely positive. Most of the reviewers praised Scott's choice of a picturesque subject and his authentic portrayal of 16th-century Border society. The minstrel's own interludes attracted favourable comment.

== Cultural allusions ==
- The lines that begin the final canto, "Breathes there the man, with soul so dead, Who never to himself hath said, / This is my own, my native land!", are cited in Edward Everett Hale's story "The Man Without a Country" (1863).
- The title of the concert overture The Land of the Mountain and the Flood (1867) by Hamish MacCunn is also taken from Canto 6 (stanza 2).
- Lord Peter Wimsey refers to the goblin page in Canto 6 ('The elvish page fell to the ground, And, shuddering, mutter’d, “Found! found! found!”') in Chapter III of Dorothy L.Sayers's Clouds of Witness (1926).
- In Vol I, Chapter IX of Mansfield Park, Fanny Price quotes the poem when she visits the chapel at Sotherton and is disappointed it does not live up to her romantic expectations.
- Andie MacDowell's character quotes Canto 6 in the 1993 film Groundhog Day: "The wretch, concentered all in self, / Living, shall forfeit fair renown, / And, doubly dying, shall go down / To the vile dust, from whence he sprung, / Unwept, unhonoured, and unsung."
- The 1946 movie A Matter of Life and Death closes with the celestial judge quoting from the Third Canto: "Love rules the court, the camp, the grove / And men below, and saints above; / For love is heaven, and heaven is love."
