= Battle of Melrose =

- Part of the Scottish clan wars
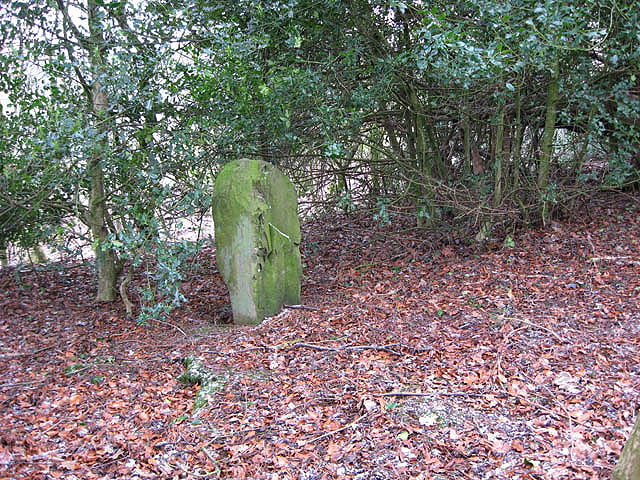
- The "Turn Again Stone" is believed to have been erected after the Battle of Melrose in 1526 and marks the spot where one of the Eliotts turned to spear his pursuer, Kerr of Cessford
Date	29 July 1526
Location	Melrose, Scottish Borders
Result	Douglas victory

Belligerents
Clan Douglas; Clan Kerr; Clan Maxwell	Clan Scott; Clan Eliott

Commanders and leaders
Earl of Angus; Kerr of Ferniehirst; Kerr of Cessford †; Lord Maxwell	Scott of Buccleuch

Strength
Unknown	600 to 1,000

Casualties and losses
100 killed, including Kerr the Laird of Cessford	80 killed (four score)

Registered battlefield
- Official name: Battle of Darnick
- Designated: 14 December 2012
- Reference no.: BTL30

The Battle of Melrose (also known as the Battle of Darnick) was a Scottish clan battle that took place on 29 July 1526. Walter Scott of Branxholme and Buccleuch attempted to rescue the young James V of Scotland from the powerful Archibald Douglas, 6th Earl of Angus.

== Background ==
Guardianship of the young James V of Scotland had been secured by Archibald Douglas, 6th Earl of Angus in what was supposed to be a three monthly arrangement whereby each of the four members of the Council of Regency would care for James. However, Angus refused to hand James over to the Earl of Arran whose turn it was next. James sent a message out to Sir Walter Scott asking him to launch a rescue attempt. The young King James, while being escorted on a journey to Edinburgh by Angus was intercepted by a large body of Border Reivers led by Sir Walter Scott at Melrose.

== Battle ==
Angus's force mainly consisted of Kerrs and stood its ground, managing to drive off the attackers. Scott led as many as 1000 men down Eildon Hill at Melrose. Angus’s men charged and Scott’s men stood their ground also. However, the Lord Hume arrived with a reinforcement of 80 Kerrs to support Angus, they attacked the wing of Scott's force afresh, and the Scotts and Eliotts began to fall back and run. During the pursuit Andrew Kerr of Cessford was killed by one of the Eliotts. Scott lost about 80 of his men while the Earl of Angus lost about 100, but still won the battle.

== Aftermath ==
The young King James stayed at Darnick Tower on the night following the battle and proceeded to Edinburgh the next day. In the aftermath of the Battle of Melrose a deadly feud raged for many years in the Scottish Borders between the Kerrs and Scotts due to the death of Andrew Kerr, Laird of Cessford at the battle. On 4 September 1526 the Battle of Linlithgow Bridge took place where once again anti-Douglas forces attempted to rescue the young King James from the Earl of Angus.
