= Clan Kerr =

Scottish clan

- Cearr, MacGhillechearr
- Crest: The sun in his splendour Or
- Motto: Sero sed serio (Late but in earnest)
- Slogan: Late but in Earnest

Profile
- District: Scottish Borders
- Plant badge: Bog Myrtle

Chief
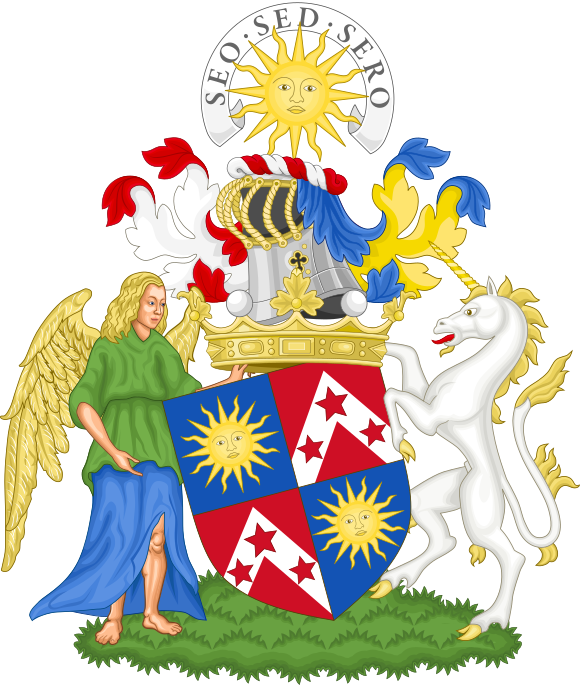
- The Most Hon. Ralph Kerr
- The 14th Marquess of Lothian
- Seat: Ferniehirst Castle
Septs of Clan Kerr
Carr, Cares, Carre, Cessford, Ker
Clan branches
Kerr of Ferniehurst (chiefs) (Marquess of Lothian)
Ker of Cessford (senior cadets) (Duke of Roxburghe)
Kerr of Linton
Ker of Kersland
Allied clans
Clan Leslie
Rival clans
Clan Scott
Clan Heron

Clan Kerr (/kɜːr/) is a Scottish clan whose origins lie in the Scottish Borders. During the Middle Ages, it was one of the prominent border reiver clans along the present-day Anglo-Scottish border and played an important role in the history of the Border country of Scotland.

== History ==
=== Origins of the clan ===
The name Kerr is rendered in various forms such as Kerr, Ker, Kear, Carr, Karr, Carre, Cares and Kera. Theories on the origin of the name vary; some arguing it stems from the Middle English: kerr which refers to brushwood, low lying grassland, marsh or fen. Alternatively, the surname Kerr may derive from the Brittonic languages, originating from the word caer (sometimes written as kaer or ker) meaning 'fortress' or 'stronghold'. This theory is supported by the historical presence of the Brittonic language Cumbric, which was once spoken in the Scottish Lowlands, where the name Kerr first emerged in Scotland.

Another variant is found on the west coast of Scotland, particularly on the Isle of Arran, taken from the Scottish ciar, meaning dusky, or Irish ceàrr, meaning left-handed. In some cases it is thought to come from the Welsh word cawr, meaning giant. Alternatively, it may derive from the Irish and Scottish cearr, meaning pointed spear.

The early Roxburghshire Kerrs had their origins in the 12th century Ayrshire bailiery of Cunninghame. During the reign of David I (1082–1153), Hugh de Morville, Lord High Constable of Scotland, granted lands in Cunninghame to the Norman family of William de Ker. These lands became known as Kersland. At this time, Cunninghame was under the control of de Morville who also maintained the nearby port of Irvine – one of Scotland's earliest capitals – as his military headquarters.

Hugh de Morville hailed from the Normandy town of Morville. In an era when noble families defined themselves by their location of origin, it is conceivable that the roots of the family of William de Ker (William from Ker) lie in a town bearing the name of Ker. Though speculative, this could be the Normandy town of Criel, renamed Criel-sur-Mer in 1902. According to a publication from 1740: "Ker veut dire une maison; & je crois que le nom du bourg de Criel en est derivé..." ("Ker means a house; and I think that the name of the village of Criel is derived from it...")

William de Ker's grandson is said to have been allied to Sir William Wallace in the struggle for Scottish independence: "William Ker of Kersland joined Wallace in 1296. He and Stephen of Ireland are said to have been the only two of Wallace's men who survived the battle of Elcho. Ker was the constant friend and companion of Wallace. In 1305, when Wallace was taken prisoner at Robroyston, William Ker only was with him. They were found both asleep, and Ker was unfortunately killed in the scuffle".

Family tradition asserts the Norman origin for the chiefs comes from two brothers, Ralph and Robert (also called John), who came to Roxburgh from Lancashire. It has never been confirmed who was the elder, although the senior branch of the family, the Kerrs of Ferniehurst claim descent from Ralph, while their rivals, the Kerrs of Cessford, descended from John.

Asked how to say his name, Admiral Mark Kerr told The Literary Digest in 1935, "In Scotland the name rhymes with care. Since many of the family have come to England the pronunciation in this country rhymes with car, which we have entirely submitted to." Another common pronunciation of Kerr, such as in the majority of the United States, is "kur".

=== 15th and 16th century clan conflicts ===
The two main branches of the Clan Kerr, the Kerrs of Ferniehurst and the Kerrs of Cessford, often feuded with each other. However, both Andrew Kerr of Ferniehurst and Andrew Kerr of Cessford were made Wardens of the Middle Marches, the first in 1502 and the latter after the Battle of Flodden in 1513. After Flodden, some of the Liddesdale clans put themselves under the Kerr of Ferniehurst's protection, but, in 1523, his castle was captured by an English force after a protracted defence.

The Clan Kerr feuded in particular with the Clan Scott. The feud began on 25 July 1526, when Sir Walter Scott of Buccleuch launched an attack (the Battle of Melrose) to rescue the young James V of Scotland who was being held by the Douglas Earl of Angus at Darnick just west of Melrose, and in the ensuing fight Kerr of Cessford was killed. The Kerrs, however, took their time and, in 1552, they set upon Sir Walter Scott on Edinburgh High Street and killed him. The feud came to an end when Sir Thomas Kerr of Ferniehirst married Janet Scott who was the sister of the tenth Scott Laird of Buccleuch.

Mark Kerr had his lands of Newbattle and Prestongrange erected into the barony of Newbattle by a charter of 1591.

=== 17th century and Civil War ===
In 1606, Mark Kerr was created Earl of Lothian. This title failed when his son died in 1624 without male issue. In 1621, Sir Andrew Kerr of Ferniehurst was created Lord Jedburgh.

The third peerage to come to the family was the earldom of Ancram, which was given to Sir Robert Kerr, a descendant of a younger son of Sir Andrew Kerr of Ferniehurst. In 1616, Sir Robert Ker of Cessford, by this time spelt his surname with a single 'r', was created Earl of Roxburghe. In 1631, Sir William Kerr, son of the Earl of Ancram, was granted a new earldom of Lothian in 1631. His son was Robert Kerr who was advanced to the rank of marquess and who also succeeded to the earldom of Ancram on the death of his uncle.

During the Scottish Civil War, Colonel Kerr supported the Covenanter commander, General David Leslie, Lord Newark, and took the Clan Mackenzie's Redcastle, demolished it, and hanged the garrison.

=== 18th century and Jacobite risings ===
Lord Mark Kerr, son of the Chief, Robert Kerr, 1st Marquis of Lothian, was a distinguished professional soldier and is reputed to have had a high sense of personal honour and a quick temper. He fought several duels throughout his military career but rose ultimately to the rank of general, and was appointed governor of Edinburgh Castle in 1745.

During the Jacobite rising of 1745, the Clan Kerr supported the British government. At the Battle of Culloden in 1746, Lord Kerr's great nephew, Lord Robert Kerr (son of William Kerr, 3rd Marquis of Lothian), who was Captain of the grenadiers in Barrell's regiment, received the first charging Cameron on the point of his Spontoon, but a second cut him through the head to chin. He has the dubious distinction of being the only person of high rank killed on the government side. The eldest of the brothers, Mark, Lord Kerr, later the fourth Marquess of Lothian, commanded three squadrons of government cavalry at the Battle of Culloden and survived to serve under the Duke of Cumberland in France in 1758.

== Left-handedness ==
The Kerrs have typically been associated with left-handedness, and some of their buildings, such as Ferniehirst Castle, supposedly have turnpike stairs explicitly designed with this in mind, though this is disputed. Andrew Ker (1471–1545), known as Dand, developed Ferniehirst into a formidable stronghold. Both Dand and his paternal grandfather, Andrew of Cessford, are believed to have been left-handed swordsmen. A left-handed mercenary warrior could command a higher fee for his services, and those who fought under the Ferniehirst and Cessford banners were encouraged to fight "ker-handed".

There is an anecdotal link between the Kerrs and left-handedness. An article in the British Medical Journal around 1972 stated that about 30% of those with the surname Kerr were left-handed, compared to 11% as the world's population. However, a 1993 study found no statistically significant increase in left-handedness among people with the family name Kerr or Carr.

== Castles ==
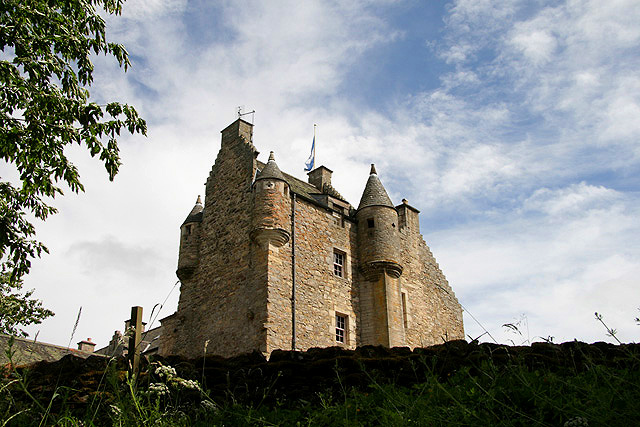
Ferniehirst Castle, seat of the Kerrs of Ferniehirst, chiefs of Clan Kerr

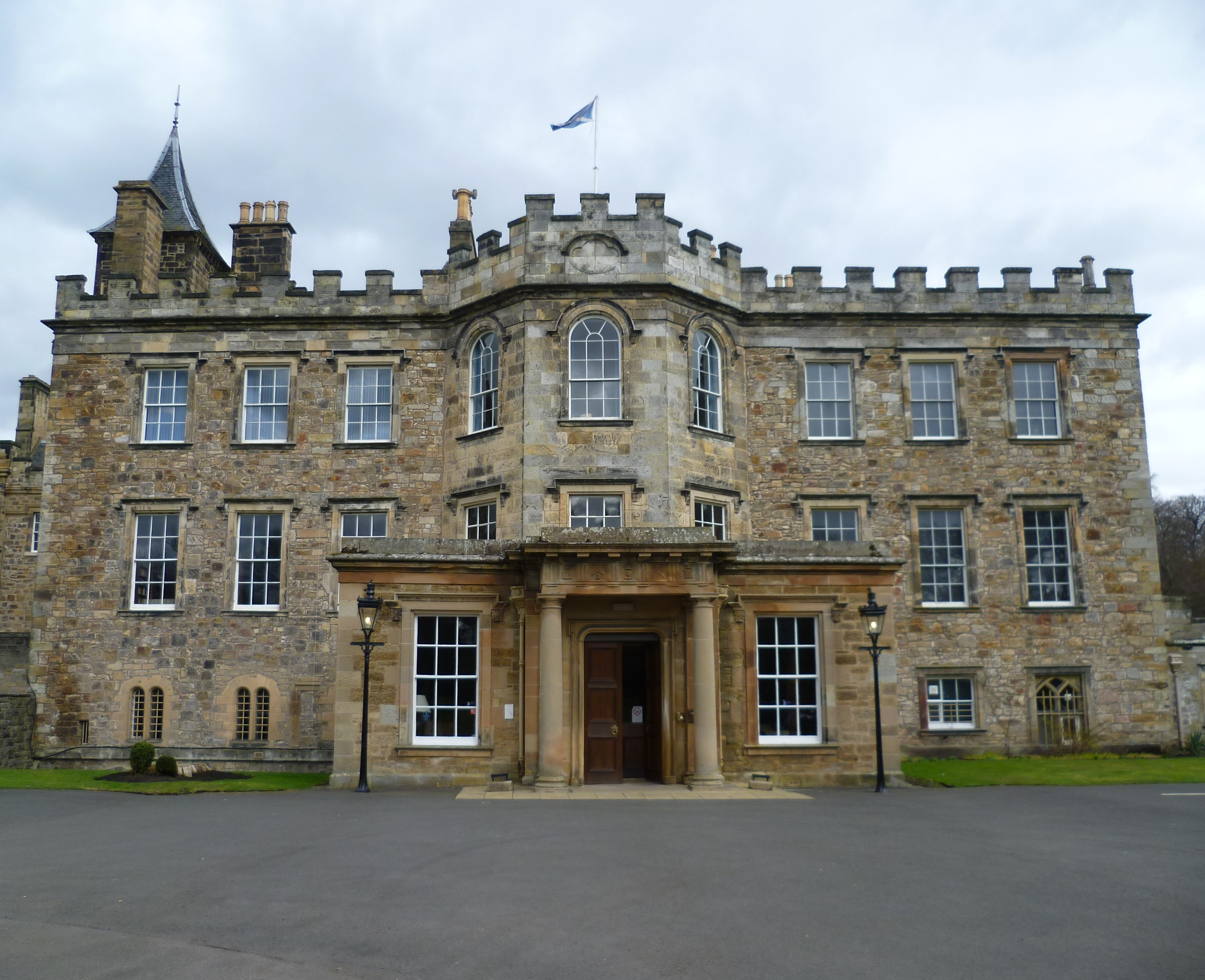
Newbattle Abbey, a later seat of the Kerrs of Ferniehirst who became Marqueses of Lothian

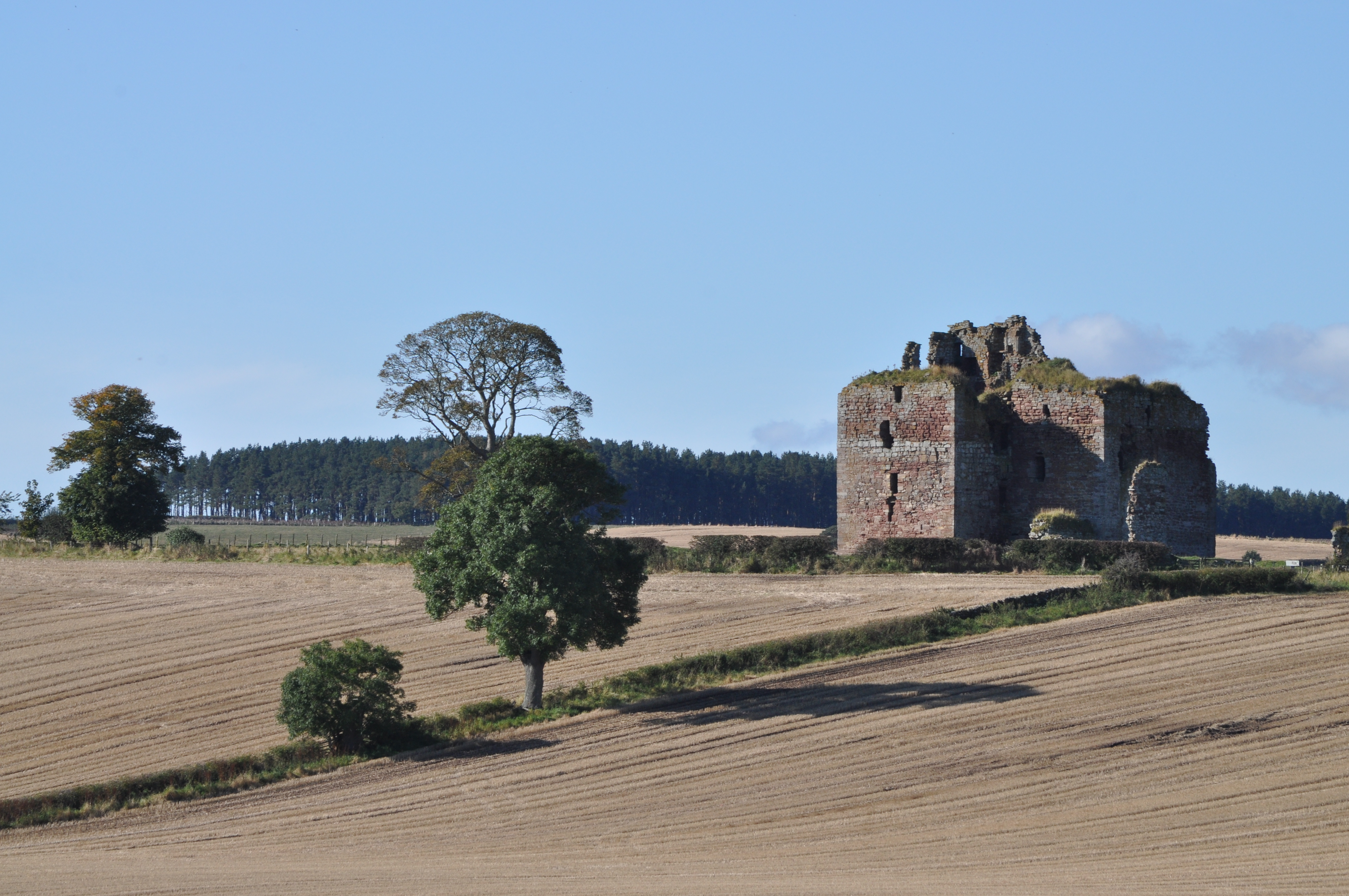
The ruins of Cessford Castle, former seat of the Kerr of Cessford branch of the clan, who were once rivals to the chiefly Kerrs of Ferniehurst

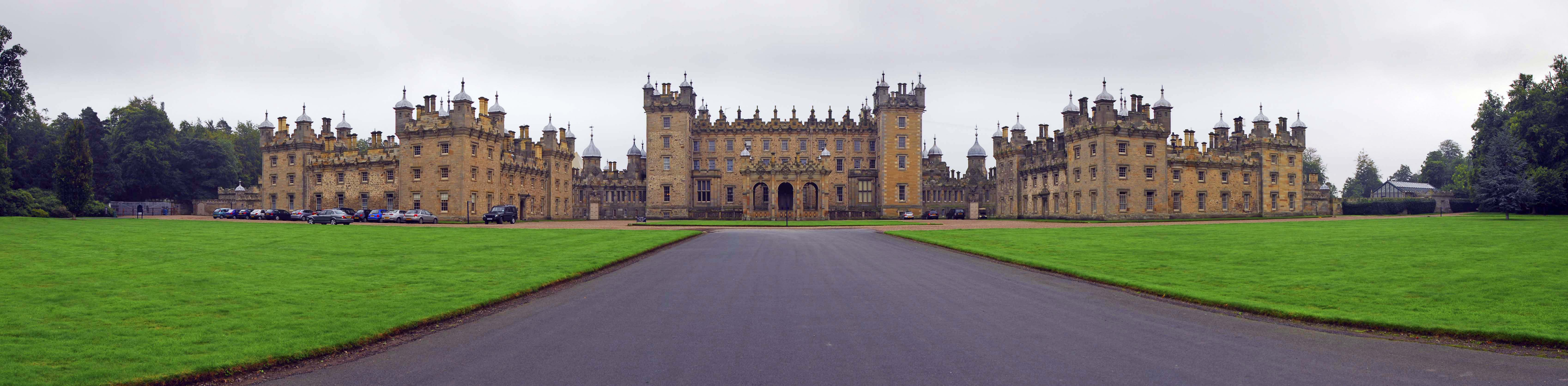
Floors Castle, a later seat of the Kerrs of Cessford who became Dukes of Roxburghe

Castles that have been owned by the Clan Kerr include among others:

- Ferniehirst Castle is about a mile south of Jedburgh in the Scottish Borders. It is now an extended and altered tower house that incorporates work from the sixteenth century. The castle was first built in 1470 and the Kerr of Ferniehirst branch of the clan were made Wardens of the Middle Marches in 1502. The original entrance leads to a staircase known as the 'Left-Handed Staircase' based on a story that Sir Andrew Kerr having returned from the Battle of Flodden in 1513, and who was left handed, had his followers trained to use their weapons with their left hands. The castle was sacked in 1523 by the English, but was recaptured in 1549 with French help, and the leader of the captured garrison was executed. In 1570, the castle was damaged in a raid when Sir Thomas Kerr of Ferniehirst, protector of Mary, Queen of Scots, hoped to have her released from imprisonment. In 1593, James VI of Scotland attacked the castle because of the help that the Kerrs had given to Francis Stewart, 5th Earl of Bothwell, whom the king had accused of witchcraft and treason. Between 1934 and 1984, the castle was leased by the Scottish Youth Hostel Association, apart from during World War II when it was used as an army billet. The Kerr Marquises of Lothian and Earls of Ancrum still own Ferniehirst Castle although they live in London. The castle is said to be haunted by a Green Lady and is open to the public in July.
- Newbattle Abbey or Newbattle Castle is a mile south-west of Dalkeith in Midlothian. After the Protestant Reformation the property was given to the Kerrs of Ferniehirst and they were made Lords of Newbattle in 1591, and Earls of Lothian in 1606. The feud between the Kerrs of Ferniehirst and the Kerrs of Cessford was ended in 1631, when William Kerr of Ferniehirst married Ann Kerr of Cessford and the family were made Marqueses of Lothian in 1701. Many of the Newbattle buildings were demolished but some were incorporated into a fortified dwelling for the family. It was remodeled down the centuries into a large mansion. The eleventh Marquis of Lothian gave the building to the nation and it is now an adult education college. The castle is said to be haunted with stories of a Grey Lady, said to be the spirit of a girl who was killed when she fell in love with a monk, as well as stories of spectral monks haunting the grounds.
- Cessford Castle, a massive L-plan castle and is now a ruin. The castle dates from the fifteenth century or earlier. It was surrounded by a curtain wall with a second wall and ditch beyond this. The castle was held by the Kerrs of Cessford who became rivals of the Kerrs of Ferniehirst.Sir Andrew Kerr of Cessford fought and survived the Battle of Flodden in 1513, but Cessford Castle was attacked by the English in 1519. It was besieged by the English four years later who reckoned it the third strongest fortress in Scotland. The castle was torched in 1543 and sacked by the English a year later. Sir Walter Kerr of Cessford was banished to France for being involved in the murder of Walter Scott of Branxholme and Buccleuch in 1552. The Kerrs of Cessford were made Earls in 1616 and then Dukes of Roxburghe in 1704. In about 1650, Cessford Castle was abandoned and the materials were used to build Floors Castle.
- Floors Castle is a massive castellated mansion that dates from 1721. It was designed by William Adam, but was remodeled by William Henry Playfair in the nineteenth century.

== Chief ==
- Clan chief: Ralph William Francis Joseph Kerr, 14th Marquess of Lothian
- Arms: Quarterly, 1st & 4th, Azure, the sun in his splendour Or (for the peerage of Lothian); 2nd & 3rd, Gules, on a chevron Argent, three mullets of the field (Kerr)

== Crest ==
The family crest comprises the Latin motto 'Sero Sed Serio' (late, but in earnest) with an image of the sun at its centre. The motto was adopted following the Battle of Ancrum Moor, in February 1545, which took place around 10 km from Ferniehirst Castle during the Rough Wooing. During four hundred years of cross-border invasions, feuding and lawlessness in the Scottish Borders, survival came to depend upon a shifting pattern of allegiances. On this occasion, the Kerrs, who were accomplished mounted troops, initially sided with the English forces. As the balance of the battle tipped in favour of the Scots, the Kerrs switched loyalties and turned their cavalry against the English, who had a low winter sun in their eyes, and drove them from the field. The Kerrs thus arriving late, but in earnest.

== Tartans ==
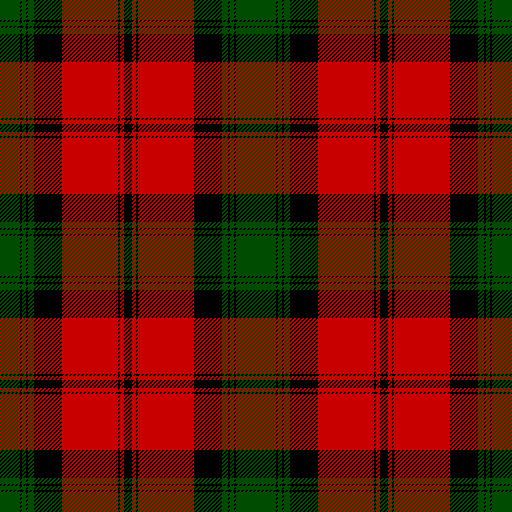
Kerr tartan, as published in 1842 in Vestiarium Scoticum.

Clan Kerr has Three recognised tartans:

- Kerr (Modern)
- Kerr (Hunting)
- Kerr (Muted)

== Bibliography ==
- MacDonald Fraser, George (1972). The Steel Bonnets. Alfred A. Knopt. ISBN 0-394-47049-4.
