= Walter Scott, 1st Lord Scott of Buccleuch =

Scottish nobleman

Arms of Scott of Buccleuch: Or, on a bend azure a mullet of six points between two crescents of the first

Walter Scott, 5th of Buccleuch, 1st Lord Scott of Buccleuch (1565 – 15 December 1611) was a Scottish nobleman and famous border reiver, known as the "Bold Buccleuch" and leader of Kinmont Willie's Raid.

== Early life ==
Scott was the son of Sir Walter Scott, 4th of Buccleuch (himself grandson of Walter Scott of Branxholme and Buccleuch) and Margaret Douglas.

== Career ==
He was knighted by James VI of Scotland on 17 May 1590 at the coronation of Anne of Denmark. He was later appointed Keeper of Liddesdale and Warden of the West March on the English border.

Buccleuch was implicated in the troubles of his step-father, the rebellious Earl of Bothwell. He went abroad in September 1591, first travelling to Italy with the poet William Fowler. In November 1592 Buccleuch was allowed to return to Scotland from Flanders by the intercession of Anne of Denmark, at the request of the old Lady Ferniehirst. In 1594, Buccleuch was re-appointed Keeper of Liddesdale.

In August 1594 he performed in tournament at the baptism of Prince Henry dressed as an Amazon. In January 1595 he influenced Anne of Denmark to intercede for the life of James Scott of Balwearie, an agent of the rebel Catholic earls. It was suspected an English Catholic agent, Nicholas Williamson, tried to meet him in March 1595.

In April 1595 and in 1597 he raided Tynedale in England with 100 or 1,000 men. They killed at least 30 residents, and burnt houses at Thorneburn, Donkleywood, Stokoe, Hordley Hill House and others including the home of a widow, Catherine Dodd of Bruntbank, and caused damage valued at £191, and killed four members of the Charlton family at Bought Hill (now Charlton, Northumberland).

=== Kinmont Willie ===
As Keeper of Liddesdale he rescued Kinmont Willie Armstrong from prison in Carlisle, an exploit famous in border lore. Armstrong, a well-known border reiver, was captured by English soldiers led by Deputy Warden Salkeld on 17 March 1596, in violation of a truce day. He was taken to Carlisle and imprisoned in Carlisle Castle. Buccleuch, as Keeper of Liddesdale, petitioned the English Warden Thomas Scrope, 10th Baron Scrope of Bolton for Armstrong's release without success. Unable to release Armstrong by diplomatic means, on the night of 13 April 1596 Buccleuch led a party of about 80 men to Carlisle. Leaving the main body of his men a small distance outside the city to ambush any pursuers, Buccleuch took a small raiding party on to the castle where Armstrong was imprisoned. Finding their ladders too short to scale the walls, the raiding party breached a postern gate — or more probably bribed a contact inside the castle to open it for them — located Armstrong's cell and freed him, returning him back across the Scottish border. No fatalities were occasioned on either side.

The raid on Carlisle created a diplomatic incident between England and Scotland, and war between the two nations appeared imminent until Buccleuch surrendered himself to the English authorities. Tried and found guilty, Buccleuch was placed in the custody of the English Master of the Ordnance at Berwick, Sir William Selby, and was afterwards sent to London.

When Buccleuch reached London, and, having been presented to Queen Elizabeth I, was asked by her how he dared to undertake an enterprise so desperate and presumptuous, Buccleuch is reported to have replied, "What is it that a man dare not do?" Unaccustomed though she must have been to such rejoinders from her own courtly nobles, Elizabeth not only did not resent the answer, but turning to a lord-in-waiting, said, "With ten thousand such men, our brother in Scotland might shake the firmest throne of Europe".

== In literature ==
Buccleuch's kinsman, the author Sir Walter Scott, transcribed a well-known ballad about the raid entitled Kinmont Willie in his collection Minstrelsy of the Scottish Border, Vol. 1.

=== Lord Scott of Buccleuch ===
He was created a Lord of Parliament, as Lord Scott of Buccleuch, in 1606 (pursuant to a commission from King James dated 18 March 1606).

From 1604 until the truce of 1609, Buccleuch led a company of Borderers in the service of Maurice of Nassau, Prince of Orange during the Dutch Revolt.

== Death ==
Buccleuch died on 15 December 1611, and was interred at St Mary's Kirk, Hawick.

== Family ==
Scott married (contract dated 1 October 1586) Mary, daughter of Sir William Kerr of Cessford and Janet Douglas. They had four children:

1. Walter Scott, 1st Earl of Buccleuch (d. 20 November 1633)
2. Margaret Scott (died 5 October 1651) married first James Ross, 6th Lord Ross; married secondly Alexander Montgomerie, 6th Earl of Eglinton
3. Elizabeth Scott, who married (contract dated 22 November 1616) John Cranstoun, later 2nd Lord Cranstoun
4. Jean Scott (died after 21 November 1613).

Scott also had (apparently by Delia, daughter of Captain Thomas Butler in Holland) an illegitimate daughter, Jean, who married Robert Scott of Whitslaid. He had an illegitimate son, John (probably to be identified with John Scott, Provost of Crichton, who died in 1646).

== See also ==
- Duke of Buccleuch
- Clan Scott

Peerage of Scotland
New creation	Lord Scott of Buccleuch; 1606–1611	Succeeded by Walter Scott
