= Flisk =

Former parish in Fife, Scotland

Coordinates: 56.389465°N 3.095183°W

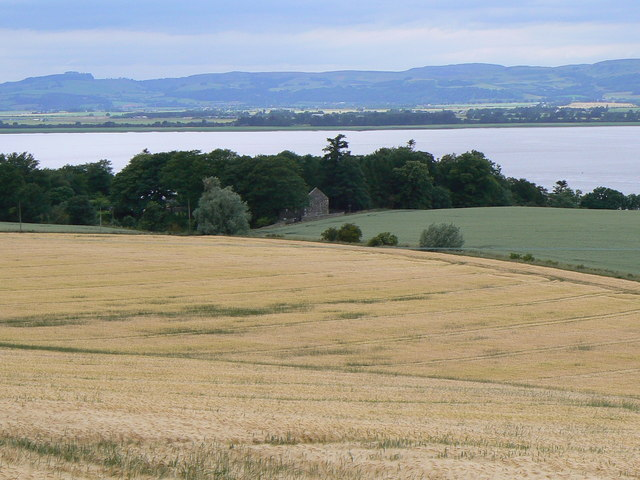
- Flisk Old Church. Half-hidden in the trees beside Flisk Point, with the Firth of Tay behind

- Location within Fife
- Council area: Fife
- Lieutenancy area: Fife
- Country: Scotland
- Sovereign state: United Kingdom
- Police: Scotland
- Fire: Scottish
- Ambulance: Scottish
- UK Parliament: Kirkcaldy and Cowdenbeath
- Scottish Parliament: Kirkcaldy Mid Scotland and Fife

Flisk (Scottish Gaelic: Fleasg meaning "Stalk" or "Rod") was a parish in Fife, Scotland.

== Description ==
According to the 1853 Gazetteer, in part: "Flisk parish is bounded on the north by the Tay, on the south by Creich and Abdie, on the east by Balmerino and on the west by Dunbog. It is 4 miles in length from east to west and 1 mile in breadth. Area 3.5 square miles; under cultivation 2210 acres; under pasture 140 acres; under wood 266 acres. Occupying the northern slope of the Ochils, a considerable portion of its surface is hilly and irregular, except about mile from the river, where it is level ground along the whole extent of the parish: the hills are Lyndemus, nearly 750 feet above sea level, Logie Law and Glenduckie Hill. With the exception of the Tay, the parish is watered by small burns and supplied by innumerable springs of the finest water.

"The soil for the most part is a clayey loam, varying from 1 to 3 feet in depth, lying on rock, clay and till; the whole is nevertheless fertile, and the land is found cultivated from the shore of the Tay to the summit of the hills. Rent of arable is at an average £1-10s. per acre. Much has been done by draining land naturally wet; till lately stone draining was chiefly used, but now tile-draining is introduced; some of the grounds are not sufficiently enclosed; a mixture of 1 part of bone-dust to 2 parts of coal ashes is much used for turnips on the hill lands; wheat, barley, and oats, with potatoes, turnips, peas and beans are grown in the proportion of the order given here; the Fifeshire breed of cattle crossed with the Forfarshire is the kind kept; there are few sheep kept, owing to the hardness of the soil not being favourable to grass; there are eight thrashing mills...

"there is a great deficiency of cottages in this parish, which is the cause of the continued decrease of Population. There are 3 heritors. The population in 1851 was 213. Coals have to be brought from Newburgh or Balmerino or the Balbirnie pit; though some use English coal, brought in vessels to the beach. There are 3 quarries of sandstone and clinkstone; none of them of importance, and only used for local purposes. The parish being entirely a rural one, there are no manufactures carried on within it. The patron is the Earl of Zetland... There is no Dissenting place of worship. Parish school only. There are no fairs nor public houses in the parish... The nearest market towns are Newburgh 6 miles, Cupar 8 miles and Dundee 10 miles. There is a post office at Newburgh, but the post town is Cupar. There is no village, but a small hamlet, the farm of Glenduckie, consisting of a dozen cottages...

"The barony of Ballanbreich ... originally included the whole of the parish. This formed part of the great lordship of Abernethy; the extensive barony of which remained for nearly 500 years in the family of the Rothes...

== Flisk Wood ==
Flisk Wood on the southern shore of the Inner Tay Estuary is a linear woodland between Balmerino in the east and Flisk Point in the west. At 63.4 hectares, Flisk Wood is the largest and least disturbed area of mixed deciduous woodland in Fife. It includes the most extensive stand of ash-elm woodland in north-east Fife and the tree canopy is complemented with sycamore, sessile oak, wild cherry and willow. On more leached, acidic soils in the western section, pedunculate oak replaces sessile oak. There is a mixed shrub layer of hazel, hawthorn and blackthorn throughout the woodland. A large proportion of the site, particularly in the eastern, has been planted with (non-native)sycamore, beech, lime, chestnut, European and Japanese larches, Douglas fir, Norway spruce and Scots pine. (SNH SSSI Site Management Statement)

There is a right of way on the western boundary leading to Flisk Point and access along the shore from Balmerino. It is one of Scotland's protected places for nature and designated by Scottish Natural Heritage as a site of special scientific interest - first in 1971 and most recently in 1984.

== Sources ==
- Barbieri, M. (1857). A descriptive and historical gazetteer of the counties of Fife, Kinross and Clackmannan: with anecdotes, narratives and graphic sketches, moral, political, commercial and agricultural. Maclachlan & Stewart.

Anon (2007) Flisk Wood Site of Special Scientific Interest Site Management Statement. Scottish Natural Heritage. http://gateway.snh.gov.uk/sitelink/documentview.jsp?p_pa_code=644&p_Doc_Type_ID=3
