= David Betoun of Creich =

Scottish landowner and administrator

David Betoun of Creich (1466–1505) was a Scottish landowner and courtier.

His family home was Creich Castle. He was keeper of Falkland Palace, chamberlain of Fife, and a "familiar servant" of James IV.

The surnames are spelled variously as "Beaton", "Betoun", or "Bethune".

He was Treasurer of Scotland in the years 1500 and 1501. In December 1496 he and Sir David Arnot bought clothes in Edinburgh for Margaret Drummond, a mistress of James IV of Scotland, and were paid for their expenses.

== Family ==
He married Janet Duddingston. Their children included:

- Janette Betoun, who married (1) Sir Robert Livingstone and (2) James Hamilton, 1st Earl of Arran
- John Beaton, who married Jean Hay, and was the father of Robert Beaton of Creich
- Grizel Beaton, who married John Lyle, 4th Lord Lyle
