= Collairnie Castle =

Castle in Dunbog, Fife, Scotland

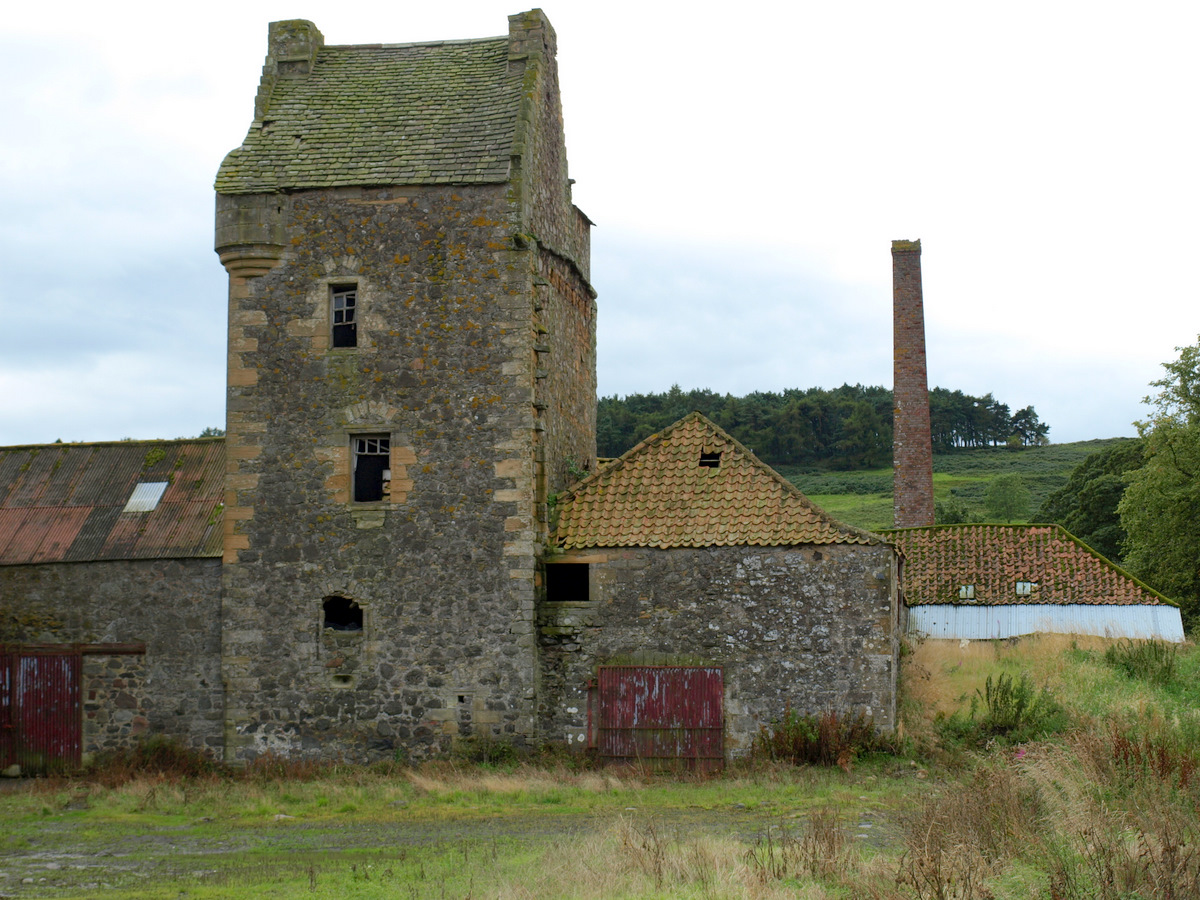
- Ruins of Collairnie Castle
- Interactive map of Collairnie Castle
- 56.34191°N 3.12402°W
- Type: Castle
- Location: Dunbog, Fife, Scotland
- OS grid reference: NO 30616 17184

Site notes
- Material: Stone
- Condition: Ruined
- Public access: Yes

Scheduled monument
- Official name: Collairnie Castle
- Designated: 4 January 1926
- Reference no.: SM847

Collairnie Castle is an L-plan castle in Dunbog, Fife, Scotland. The castle was extended in the 16th century, with a wing added of 4 storeys with an attic. The main block has been reduced to a single storey, and the tower is now incorporated into a 19th-century farm steading. It is described as having "become an embarrassment as the work of the farm subscribes" it. Inside the remaining floors are two painted ceilings. The castle is protected as a scheduled monument.

Owned by the Barclay family until 1789, it passed to the Balfours.

On her way to St Andrews in 1564, it is said that Mary Queen of Scots spent three nights at Collairnie. Mary stayed at Collairnie on 26 January 1565.

== See also ==
- Scheduled monuments in Fife
