= Parbroath Castle =

Coordinates: 56°20′46.77″N 3°5′51.8″W

- Interactive map of the Parbroath Castle area

General information
- Location: Fife, Near Parbroath farm, Creich, Scotland

Parbroath Castle is a ruined castle which was the former seat of Clan Seton near Parbroath farm, Creich, Fife, Scotland.

Only a portion of a vault standing in a field still exists.

The building was designated a Category C listed building in 1984.

In March 1512 James IV of Scotland granted Parbroath to John Seton and Alexander Seton of Parbroath and his daughter Jonet. The lands had been held by the crown for the previous fifty years.

David Seton of Parbroath was comptroller of the Scottish exchequer for James VI and Chamberlain of Dunfermline for Anne of Denmark in 1590.

== Etymology ==
The name Parbroath was first recorded in 1315 as Partebrothoc, and may be of Pictish origin. The first part is *part-, the Pictish equivalent of Welsh parth meaning "side, area, region" (< Latin pars). The second is *Brothoc, a former name for the nearby Fernie Burn, derived from a cognate of Welsh brwd, with the diminutive suffix -awc.
