= Dunbog =

Coordinates: 56°20′N 3°09′W

Dunbog is a parish in the county of Fife in Scotland which is now (since 1983) united with the neighbouring parish of Abdie, Dunbog kirk closing at that time. The name of the parish possibly derives from the Scottish Gaelic, Dùn Bolg, meaning "bag fort" or "bag-like, rounded hill" although no fortification has been identified on Dunbog Hill. The parish is of entirely rural character, with small hamlets of houses at Dunbog and Glenduckie. These were formerly the settlements of farm workers, but the current inhabitants have many occupations. Dunbog parish is bounded on the north by the River Tay, on the south by Monimail, on the east by Flisk and Creich, and on the west by Abdie. The Barony of Denboig/Dunbog was established in 1687. The nearest town of any size is Newburgh. It has a small primary school with approximately fifty children, and a village hall owned by a community trust which also owns the park and playing field next door.

== The Place of Dunbog ==
In 1577 Jane de la Ramvell, Lady Creich, the mother of Mary Beaton one of the Four Maries who attended Mary Queen of Scots, died at the "Place of Dunbog". Anne of Denmark rode from Falkland Palace and stayed on 20 August 1599. In December 1599, the house was surrendered to James Wemyss of Bogy at the command of James VI because David Beaton, the heir apparent of Creich was declared a rebel.

The remains of Collairnie Castle which belonged to the Barclay family are also in Dunbog parish.
