= Thomas Kerr of Ferniehirst =

Thomas Kerr of Ferniehirst (died 31 March 1586) was a Scottish landowner, Roman Catholic and supporter of Mary, Queen of Scots. He and Jean Scott ended the feud between the Scott family and the Kerrs. Thomas and Jean were both involved with supporting Mary, Queen of Scots.

== Life ==
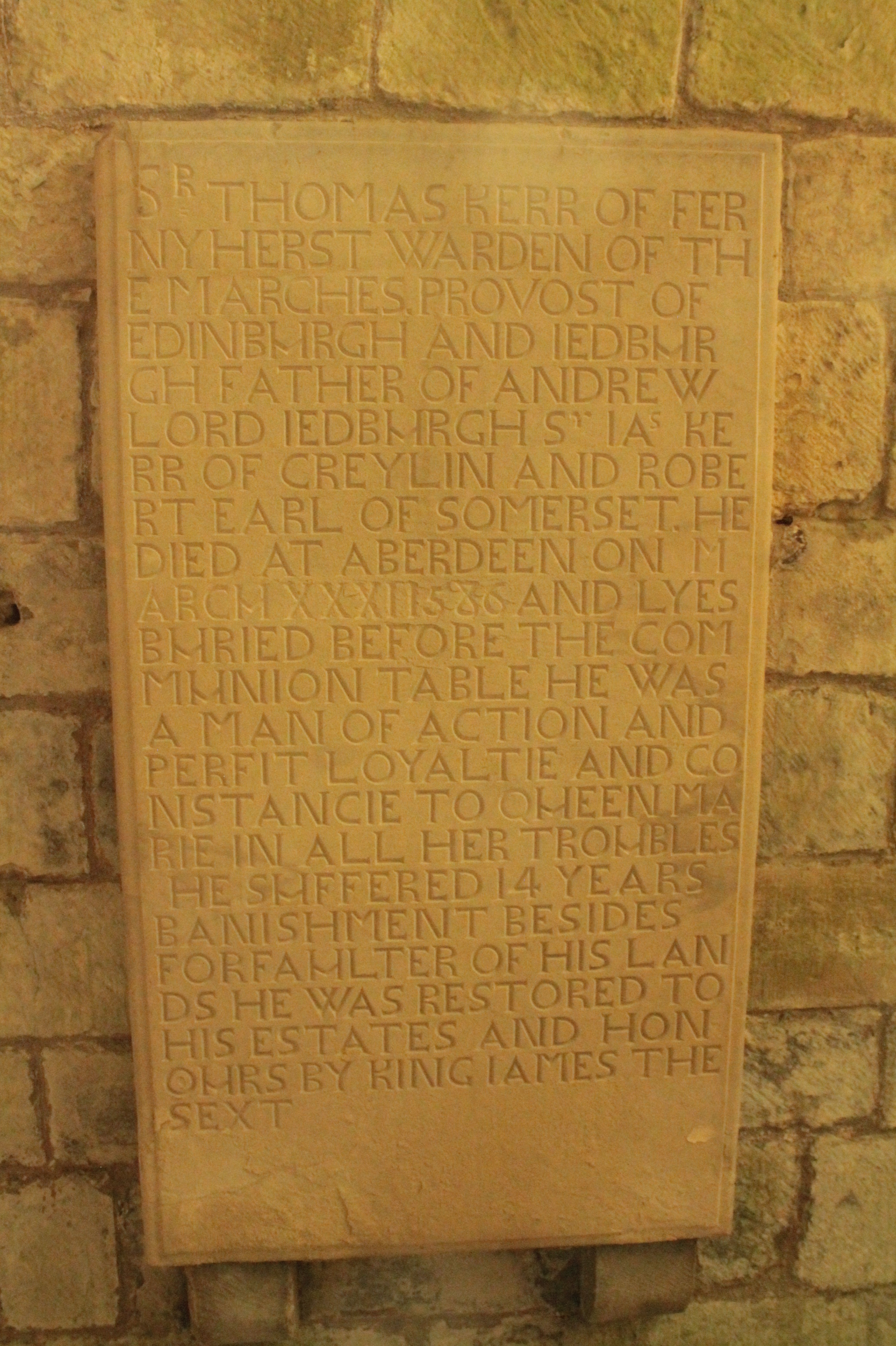
Memorial to Sir Thomas Kerr of Fernyhirst, Jedburgh Abbey

He was the son of Sir John Kerr of Ferniehirst and Katherine Kerr. His sister Margaret married Lord Hay of Yester and was the mother of William Hay, 6th Lord Hay of Yester. His homes were Oxnam and Ferniehirst Castle.

In 1565 an agreement was made to end the vendetta between the Kerr family and the Scotts. It was agreed that there would be a number of marriages between the family members to end the feud. Everyone agreed to it, but not Thomas Kerr. Despite the families' intentions none of the marriages took place, but this was an important basis for Thomas's second marriage. In 1569 he married Jean Scott, who became Lady Ferniehirst. The marriage bridged the feud between the families. A dowry was agreed but at least £1,000 was not paid by 1575. However the arranged marriage was a happy one.

A letter written by Robert Constable in 1569 described how English and Scottish rebels drank ale played cards for "placks and hardheads" at Thomas Kerr's house in Jedburgh.

During the Marian Civil War, Ferniehirst and his wife Jean were among the supporters of William Kirkcaldy of Grange who lent him money on the security of the jewels of Mary, Queen of Scots. In July 1575 he wrote from Paris to Mary, Queen of Scots, describing the destruction of his houses with fire and gunpowder by English forces during the Marian Civil War costing him at least 20,000 crowns, and the injuries sustained by his family and followers fighting for her cause in Scotland. He lost his jewels and the charters of his lands left in a coffer in Edinburgh Castle which Regent Morton confiscated. The Earl of Angus cut down his woodlands. Robert Melville was questioned about Mary's jewels. He said he did not know which pieces were held by Jean Scott, Lady Ferniehirst, but her friend, Margaret Learmonth, Grange's wife, would know.

Ferniehirst was allowed to return to Scotland and was said to have watched the execution of Regent Morton, wearing an outfit with conspicuous and extravagant cuffs. In June 1581 James Stewart, Earl of Arran tried to block the restoration and rehabilitation of Ferniehirst, who was considered guilty of taking "art and part" in the killing of the king's grandfather Regent Lennox. However, Esmé Stewart, 1st Duke of Lennox supported his return to favour and Ferniehirst knelt before the king for forgiveness in the garden at Dalkeith Palace.

The Scottish poet William Fowler reported to Francis Walsingham that the Laird of Ferniehirst had arrived secretly in London in May 1583, and was expected to go to France again.

His second wife, Janet/Jean Scott, was politically active. In October 1583 she wrote to Mary Queen of Scots from Ferniehirst with news from the Scottish court. She said she had been approached by the Countess of Arran in person and by letter hoping that Mary would not join with the Hamiltons against her husband James Stewart, Earl of Arran. She wanted Mary to advise her about this. She had forgotten to forward a letter from Lord Seton. Mary was a godparent to one of her sons.

Kerr was made a warden of the Middle March of the Scottish border and keeper of Liddesdale. In November 1584 the Privy Council allotted him 100 troops and the use of Hermitage Castle.

He is buried in Aberdeen but is memorialised in the Kerr family vault in the north transept of Jedburgh Abbey.

== Marriage and children ==
He married firstly Janet Kirkcaldy, a daughter of William Kirkcaldy of Grange and Margaret Learmonth. The children of Sir Thomas Kerr of Ferniehirst and Janet Kirkcaldy included:

- Andrew Kerr of Ferniehirst, called Lord Jedburgh. At the marriage of the "young laird Farnieherst", Andrew Kerr, to Anne Stewart, daughter of Andrew Master of Ochiltree and Margaret Stewart in January 1585 the king's bed caught fire.
- Mary Kerr
- Julian Kerr, who married (1) Patrick Hume of Polwarth, (2) Thomas Hamilton, 1st Earl of Haddington
- Margaret Kerr

He married secondly, Janet Scott, sister of Walter Scott, 4th Baron of Buccleuch. The children of Sir Thomas Kerr of Ferniehirst and Janet Scott included:

- James Kerr
- Thomas Kerr
- Anne Kerr (d. 15 Feb. 1650), who married John Elphinstone, 2nd Lord Balmerino
- Robert Carr, 1st Earl of Somerset, who married Frances Carr, Countess of Somerset, their daughter was Anne Russell, Countess of Bedford
