= Boyne Castle =

Castle in Aberdeenshire, Scotland, UK

- East of Portsoy, Aberdeenshire
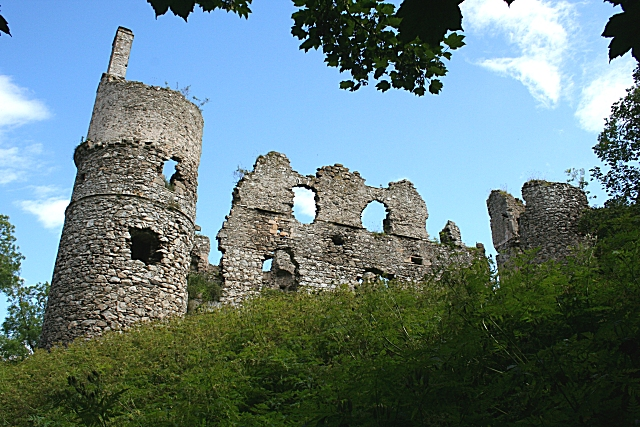
- Ruins of Boyne Castle

Location
- Coordinates: 57.6790°N 2.6530°W

Site history
- Built: 16th century

Scheduled monument
- Official name: Boyne Castle
- Type: Secular: castle
- Designated: 30 September 1933
- Reference no.: SM354

Boyne Castle (also known as the Palace of Boyne) is a 16th-century quadrangular castle about 1.5 miles (2.4 km) east of Portsoy, Aberdeenshire, Scotland, 0.5 miles (0.8 km) south of Boyne Bay.

== History ==
Around 1320, the land was owned by Thomas Randolph, 1st Earl of Moray, but passed first to the Edmonstone family and then, by marriage, to the Ogilvies.

Boyne Castle was granted by David II to Sir John Edmonstone of Edmonstone, in the count of Edinburgh. for services rendered to the King during his captivity in England. Sir James Edmonstone, son of Sir John, married the widow of Douglas, the sister of Robert III, and the Wolfe of Badenoch.

The Ogilvie family obtained this castle by marriage in 1437. The legend attached to it is that while the nurse was amusing the heir, a mere child, at an open window, he jumped from her arms and fell into the gulf below. The girl jumped after the child, but both were soon lost in the abyss. It is said that after this the family lost all taste for the castle and it began to decay.

When Mary, Queen of Scots came to the area, James Ogilvie of Cardell recorded in the household book that she stayed at the "Craig of Boyne" on 19 September 1562. This may have been a different site nearer the sea, occupied before the present castle was built. Some objects were recovered from a kitchen midden at the Craig of Boyne in 1869, including bone sewing needles, brass pins, and a lead tag that served as a quality mark on imported cloth.

Sir George Ogilvy of Dunlugas (a son of Walter Ogilvie of Dunlugas) is sometimes said to have built the castle in the late 16th century, although it is unclear if he was the owner. Charles McKean suggested that the building was slightly earlier, constructed by Alexander Ogilvy of Boyne before 1575 for his bride, Mary Beaton, a companion of Mary, Queen of Scots, brought up at the French royal court.

James VI of Scotland stayed at the castle in July 1589. His ambassadors Andrew Keith, Lord Dingwall, George Young, and John Skene brought him news from Denmark of the progress of his marriage negotiations and preparations of ships, jewels, and a silver coach for Anne of Denmark. Occupation continued until after 1723.

== Structure ==
The site of Boyne castle is naturally fortified, above the steep gorge of the Burn of Boyne, or Boyne Water, which protects it on three sides, while on the south there is a dry moat, nearly 60 feet (18 m) wide.

It has been said that Boyne Castle "was once a splendid place with fine rooms, above vaulted basements, and had large windows". The remains are overgrown and ruinous, although the walls to the west, and the towers, still stand to about 33 feet (10 m).

The four corner towers are round, and about 22 feet (6.7 m) in diameter. There is a twin-turreted gatehouse to the south. Entrance is by a causeway, which is raised and walled. There are remains of two walled gardens.

The castle ruin is a Scheduled Ancient Monument.
