= Ferniehirst Castle =

Castle in Scottish Borders, Scotland

- South of Jedburgh, Scotland
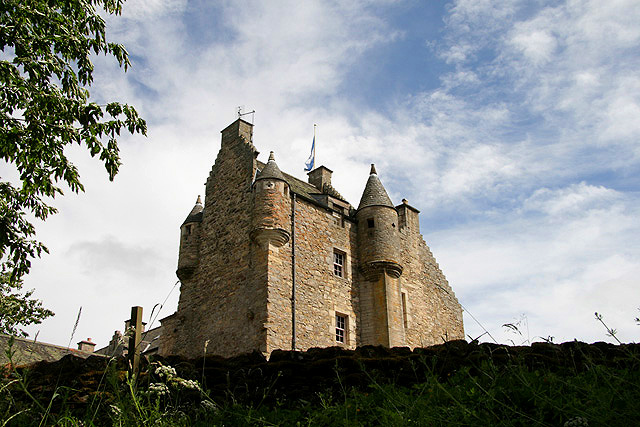
- Ferniehirst Castle, keep

Site information
- Owner: Ralph, 14th Marquess of Lothian
- Open to the public: Yes (July)

Location
- Location
- Location within Scotland
- Coordinates: 55°27′16″N 2°33′04″W

Site history
- Built: 1470
- Built by: Clan Kerr
- In use: Residential
- Battles/wars: occupied by the English in 1547-49 during the Rough Wooing

Ferniehirst Castle (sometimes spelled Ferniehurst) is an L-shaped construction on the east bank of the Jed Water, about a mile and a half south of Jedburgh, in the Scottish Borders area of Scotland, and in the former county of Roxburghshire. It is an ancient seat of the Clan Kerr, and after a period of institutional use it was restored for residential use by Peter Kerr, 12th Marquess of Lothian, in the late 20th century.

== History ==
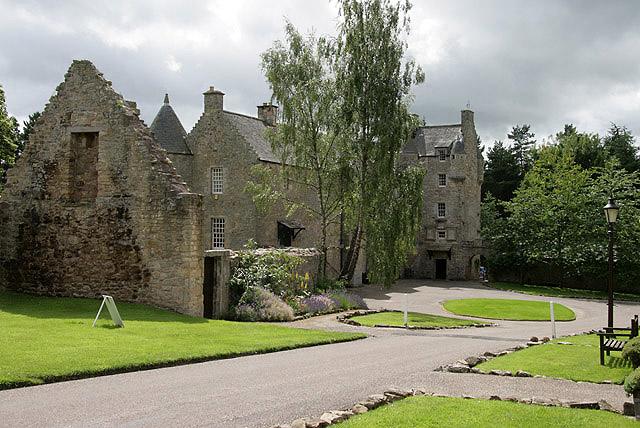
Ferniehirst Castle, courtyard

=== Sixteenth-century conflict ===
The original castle was built by the Ker (or Kerr) family around 1470. In September 1523, an English force came to burn Jedburgh, and Lord Dacre was sent with 700 men and artillery to take the castle, which "stood marvellous strongly with a great wood". Men from Kendal taking the guns through the wood encountered strong resistance, but eventually the castle was taken.

Ferniehirst was occupied by English forces in 1547, during the war of the Rough Wooing. The English were dislodged by a force of Sir John Ker's clansmen, and the Earl of Huntly reinforced by André de Montalembert and French auxiliaries led by Captain Pierre Longue in February 1549. The gate was fired, then Montalembert d'Essé brought more artillery and the soldiers set about the wall with picks and mattocks. The French soldier Jean de Beaugué described the recapture and the fate of the English captain and garrison, and the aristocrat and priest Alexander Gordon wrote an eyewitness account. An English army led by the Duke of Rutland recaptured the castle in June 1549, but the war was nearly over.

When Mary, Queen of Scots, was exiled in England, her brother Regent Moray heard rumours in August 1568 that she would escape from Bolton Castle and be brought to Ferniehirst. The exiled Countess of Northumberland stayed at Ferniehirst Castle in January 1570. She was lodged in the tower, and the Earl of Westmorland in the "overmost chamber" above.

Ferniehirst was damaged by an English raid on 18 April 1570, after Sir Thomas Ker had raided northern England, which was also intended to intimidate the supporters of Mary Queen of Scots. Another English army damaged the castle in 1573 on their way to Edinburgh Castle. James VI attacked the castle in 1593 as the Kers had assisted Francis Stewart, 5th Earl of Bothwell, who had conspired against the king. The Kers were for a long period Wardens of the Middle and East Marches. As the building had been undermined, reconstruction of the castle began in 1598.

=== Later and recent uses ===
The castle was unused in the 18th century, and re-roofed and repaired circa 1830, with a further major restoration of a part of it in 1890. It was used as a Scottish Youth Hostels Association hostel from 1934 to 1984, apart from during the Second World War, when it was requisitioned as a billet for troops. In 1988 major repairs, restoration, and alterations were carried out by Peter Kerr, 12th Marquess of Lothian, and the castle is once again a private home. It is currently used by his second son, Ralph Kerr, the 14th Marquess of Lothian, who also owns Melbourne Hall in Derbyshire. The castle is open to the public during July. It is a category A listed building.

The Ker Chapel, dating from the 17th century, is part of the property. Probably originally a mortuary chapel, it was re-roofed in 1938 and had restrained conversion and repair in 1988. It is now in use as a visitor centre and is also a category A listed building.

== Description ==
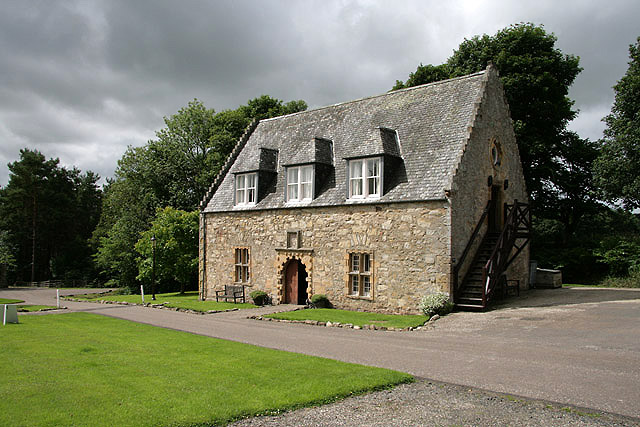
Ferniehirst Castle, visitor centre

The shorter arm of this L-plan fortalice is the 16th-century tower, containing the stair turret. The turnpike stair is in a spiral, corbelled out in the angle: apparently more for elegance than for necessity. There are many shot-holes, allowing a wide angle for musket fire, and of the more restricted shut-holes used for ventilation.

The stair spirals counter-clockwise and is known as the "left-handed staircase" as it would put right-handed attackers at a disadvantage. The story is that in 1513 when the left-handed Sir Andrew Kerr came back from the Battle of Flodden, he had his men learn to use their left hands when swordfighting. In Scotland, left-handedness has been dubbed "Corrie-fisted" or "Kerr-handed".

Ferniehirst also has a romantic array of conically-capped corner turrets. These – known as studies – are not primarily defensive: they open from the rooms of the upper floor. There is some Renaissance decoration around the windows and doors. The castle is approached through a classically-styled archway.

== See also ==
- List of castles in Scotland
- List of places in the Scottish Borders
