= Mary Beaton =

Scottish courtier (c. 1543 – 1597)

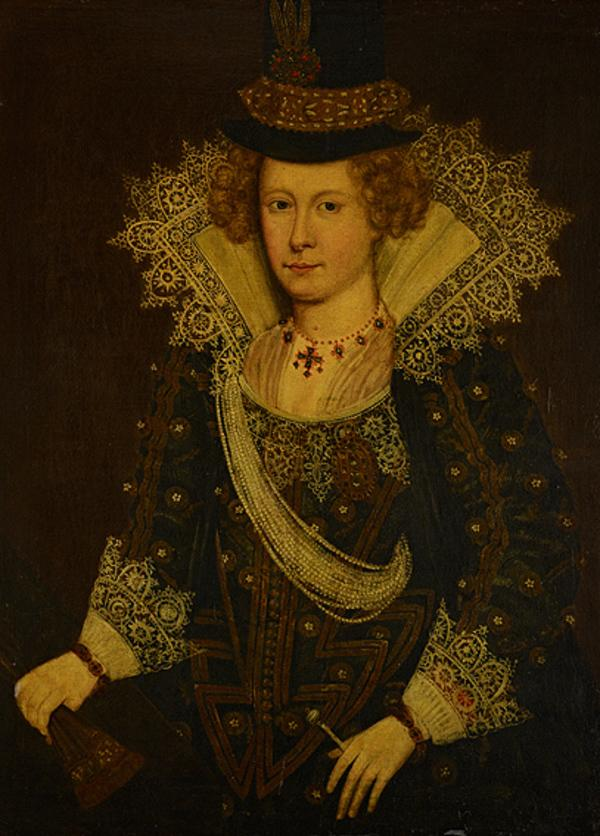
- Mary Beaton by an unknown artist (National Galleries Scotland)
- Born: c. 1543; Scotland
- Died: 1597; Scotland
- Known for: Lady-in-waiting to Mary, Queen of Scots
- Spouse: Alexander Ogilvy
- Children: James Ogilvy; Andrew Ogilvy, 1st Laird of Raggall
- Parent(s): Robert Beaton, 4th Laird of Creich; Jeanne de Gresnoir

Mary Beaton (c. 1543 – 1597), or Bethune as she wrote her family name, was a Scottish courtier. She is remembered in history as one of the four girls who were companions of Mary, Queen of Scots from childhood, known as The Queen's Maries or The Four Maries, and has also entered folklore through the traditional ballad of Marie Hamilton.

== Origins ==
Born about 1543, she was the daughter of Robert Beaton (died 1567), 4th Laird of Creich in Fife, and his French wife Jeanne Reynvell de Gresnoir or Gryssoner (died 1577).

Her mother had come to Scotland as a maid of honour to the French princess Marie de Guise, who became the wife of King James V of Scotland from 1538 until his death in 1542, and had remained in Marie's entourage until 1560 while she acted as Regent of Scotland for her infant daughter Mary. Her father, originally a page of honour and later Master of the Household, came from a family with a long tradition of royal service in different ways. His father had been steward and chamberlain of the county of Fife and keeper of the royal castle of Falkland, and his grandfather had been Lord High Treasurer of Scotland. One of his sisters was Elizabeth Beaton, who was a mistress of King James V, and another was Janet Beaton, a mistress of James Hepburn, 4th Earl of Bothwell, who was the last husband of Mary, Queen of Scots.

== Life ==
In 1548 the five-year-old Queen Mary was sent to safety in France, where in 1558 she married the future King François II of France. As her companions, her mother chose four young girls of good family who were all about the same age: Mary Beaton, Mary Seton, Mary Fleming, and Mary Livingston. When the party arrived at the French court, King Henri II was dismayed to find that the young queen did not speak fluent French and, so that she would be immersed among French speakers, sent her four companions away to be taught at a convent in Poissy.

Later reunited with the queen, the four young women returned to Scotland with her in 1561 after the death of her husband. Good-looking, well-educated, sophisticated and luxuriously dressed, they created a sensation. The English ambassador Thomas Randolph said of the four in May 1563 that a fairer sight was never seen, and judged Mary to be the most beautiful. Another English diplomat, Nicholas Throckmorton, sent Beaton a ring as a present and in 1563 Mary sent a ring to his wife in return, signing her letter "Marie de Bethune". She had clothes created for her by the queen's French dressmaker, Jean de Compiègne, who made her a black velvet gown. Beaton and Mary Fleming were given German-style fur trimmed gowns or petticoats in November 1564. At some point her younger sister Lucretia Beaton joined Mary's household, and was listed as the "young Bethune" in the 1562 menu of the household.

Already struck by her when she first returned to Scotland, though he was about 20 years older, Thomas Randolph began a courtship in 1564 once she was aged 21. At the celebrations for Twelfth Night in 1565, he took the floor with her to open the dancing and later at Stirling Castle the two took on the queen and Lord Darnley, who were shortly to be married, at a game of bowls. The pair won, and Darnley gave Mary a ring and a brooch with two agates worth fifty crowns. One of Randolph's Scottish contacts, Alexander Clark sent him a jocular letter teasing him about their relationship using nonsense words; "And as to your mistress Marie Beton, she is both darimpus and sclenbrunit, and you in like manner without contrebaxion or kylteperante, so you are both worth little money." Another admirer was George Buchanan, who wrote Latin verses praising her.

In 1566 she married Alexander Ogilvy of Boyne. A copy of the contract dated 3 May has survived. In it, the parties of the first part are the queen, acting with the consent of the king (Darnley), Mary and her father while those of the second part are Ogilvy and his friends. It defines the lands and rents that are to pass to Mary beforehand in pre-nuptial agreement and those that she is to hold jointly with him once married, subject to protections for the rights of his mother. After listing as guarantors of this settlement a number of peers, including James Hepburn, 4th Earl of Bothwell, who was to marry the queen next year, it stipulates the dowry that Mary's father was to provide. The first four signatures, in their own handwriting, are the queen, the king, Mary (who signs as "Marie de Bethune"), and Ogilvy. On 16 May the queen and king put their signatures to a document ordering the contract to be officially registered.

Although now married, she remained close to the queen, and was with her in Edinburgh Castle during the birth of Darnley's child, the future King James VI. "Lady Boyne" asked James Melville of Halhill to ride to London with the news.

When the queen fled to England in 1568 after the Battle of Langside, the unmarried Mary Seton went with her but the other three Maries stayed with their husbands in Scotland and in time attended court again. After the queen was executed in 1587, it was alleged that either Mary Beaton or Mary Fleming may have had a hand in the notorious casket letters used to incriminate her, but there is no evidence for this claim. Adam Blackwood wrote that Mary Beaton's handwriting resembled the queen's.

She had literary interests and in the queen's will, made in 1566, was left all the queen's French, English and Italian books. The will became null on remarriage and it is unlikely any of the books reached her, though she did give a copy of the plays of Terence in Latin and French to James VI. In 1590 she was among the group of women selected to welcome the new queen of Scotland, Anne of Denmark, at the Shore of Leith. She became a friend of the poet William Fowler, who served as secretary to Anne of Denmark and dedicated a translation from Ariosto to "The right honourable Ladye Marye Betoun Ladye Boine". She also wrote a poem to preface a translation of the Triumphs of Petrarch.

She died in 1597, aged about 54, leaving at least two children and three grandchildren, and has many descendants in the 21st century.

== Family ==
In 1566 she married Sir Alexander Ogilvy, 4th Laird of Boyne in Aberdeenshire, who may have built the castle of Boyne as their home. He was the son and heir of Sir Walter Ogilvy (died 1562), 3rd of Boyne, and his wife Christian Keith. Their children included:

- James Ogilvy (about 1568–1619), later 5th of Boyne, who married firstly Elizabeth Irvine and with her had at least two children: Walter Ogilvy, later 6th of Boyne, and Mary Ogilvy.
- Andrew Ogilvy (about 1570–1620), 1st Laird of Raggall, who was father of James Ogilvy, 2nd of Raggall (died 1658).

After Mary's death, her husband had two further wives, his third being Jean Gordon for whom he was the third husband, her first having been James Hepburn, 4th Earl of Bothwell, who had divorced her in 1567 in order to become the third husband of Mary, Queen of Scots.

== In popular culture ==
In Edinburgh in 1802, Sir Walter Scott published Minstrelsy of the Scottish Border, a highly influential collection of folk songs in ballad form. This includes a song called Marie Hamilton, about a lady-in-waiting of Queen Mary who after giving birth to and drowning an illegitimate child from an affair with Lord Darnley is condemned to hang:

Yestreen the queen had four Maries
This night she'll ha'e but three
There was Marie Seaton and Marie Beaton
And Marie Carmichael and me.

Scott, realising that only two of the historical Four Maries are named and that none of the historical Four Maries were executed, linked the story to that of another lady-in-waiting of the queen found in John Knox's book The History of the Reformation in Scotland. His collaborator Charles Kirkpatrick Sharpe thought however that the song more likely referred to the Mary Hamilton who was a Scottish lady-in-waiting at the court of Peter the Great, Tsar of all Russia, and was beheaded in 1719.

In the 2013-17 television series Reign, the character Lady Greer, played by Celina Sinden, was apparently based loosely on Mary Beaton, while in the 2018 film Mary, Queen of Scots, Mary Beaton was played by Eileen O’Higgins.

== See also ==
- Antonia Fraser, Mary, Queen of Scots, Dell Publishing Co., Inc. New York, March 1971
