= Walter Scott of Branxholme and Buccleuch =

Nobleman of the Scottish Borders

Arms of Scott of Buccleuch: Or, on a bend azure a mullet of six points between two crescents of the first

Sir Walter Scott, 1st of Branxholme, 3rd of Buccleuch (c. 1495 – killed 4 October 1552), known as "Wicked Wat", was a nobleman of the Scottish Borders and the chief of Clan Scott who briefly served as Warden of the Middle March active in the wars known as the Rough Wooing and a noted Border reiver. He was killed on Edinburgh High Street in a feud with Clan Kerr in 1552. His great-grandson was Sir Walter Scott, 1st Lord Scott of Buccleuch, the "Bold Buccleuch" (1565–1611), a border reiver famed for his role in the rescue of Kinmont Willie Armstrong.

== Early life ==
Walter Scott was the son of Sir Walter Scott of Buccleuch, 2nd of Buccleuch, and Elizabeth Kerr, daughter of Walter Kerr of Cessford. The elder Sir Walter succeeded his grandfather, David Scott, 1st of Buccleuch, as baron of Branxholme in 1492 and died before 15 April 1504.

He was named heir to his father on 27 October 1517, and was appointed Baillie of the lands of Melrose Abbey in 1519, a position that was soon after made hereditary and confirmed in Rome in 1525. The destruction of the Abbey in 1545 and the Scottish Reformation of the Catholic Church of 1560, created the opportunity for his successor claim ownership of much of these lands.

He was warded in Edinburgh in 1524 following a dispute with Margaret Tudor, the Queen Dowager of James IV, regarding her dower lands in Ettrick Forest, but he escaped the same year and associated himself with the opposing party of her estranged husband Archibald Douglas, 6th Earl of Angus and Matthew Stewart, 4th Earl of Lennox. He received a pardon on 9 May 1526 for an attempt to capture the Earl of Arran.

Later that year the young king James V enlisted Scott's help to free himself from the tutelage of the Douglas faction led by Angus. Scott led 600 lances to intercept the king and his train, which included Kerrs of Ferniehirst and Cessford, but was defeated by Angus's forces at the Battle of Melrose, near Darnick on 25 July. The Scotts lost 100 men and were driven off, hotly pursued by the Kerrs. In the pursuit, a rider in Scott's service killed Kerr of Cessford, an action that led to a bloody feud between the Kerrs and Scotts that would culminate 26 years later in Scott's murder. Scott was imprisoned in Blackness Castle and exiled for his role in the affair under a penalty of £10,000 Scots, but he was pardoned on 10 February 1528, and by Act of Parliament on 5 September 1528.

In October 1532 the Earl of Northumberland burned Branxholme Tower, and Buccleuch retaliated by leading 3000 lances on a formidable raid into England. In 1535 he was accused of assisting the English Warden Lord Dacre, and burning Cavers Castle and Denholm. He was warded in Edinburgh, on 19 April 1535, at the King's will, but was released before 13 May 1536, though again imprisoned in 1540.

== Marriages and children ==
Scott married, first, before 4 September 1523, Elizabeth Carmichael who died before 1530. They had two sons: and 1 daughter Helen Elisabeth Scott;

- Helen, married Nicholas Chown MP of Sussex
- David, to whom his father conveyed the lands and baronies of Branxholme, Rankilburn, Eckford, and Kinkurd, 20 October 1528. He died before 1544, unmarried.
- Sir William Scott of Kincurd (died May 1552), who married Grisel, second daughter of John Beaton of Creich, sister of his father's third wife. Father of Sir Walter Scott, 4th of Buccleuch (c. 1549 – 17 April 1574). Grandfather of Walter Scott, 1st Lord Scott of Buccleuch

In a short-lived attempt to resolve the Scott-Kerr feud, in 1530 the widowed Sir Walter married as his second wife Janet Kerr, daughter of Andrew Kerr of Fernihirst, widow of George Turnbull of Bedrule. They had no children. They were divorced, and she was still living in 1555.

Sometime before June 1544, he married his third wife, Janet Beaton or Betoun (1519–1569), daughter of John Beaton of Creich, widow of Sir James Crichton of Cranston Riddel and divorced wife of Simon Preston of Craigmillar. Their children were:

- Walter
- David
- Janet
- Grisel, who married William Borthwick, 6th Lord Borthwick
- Margaret

Later, Dame Janet Beaton favoured the alliance of James Hepburn, Earl of Bothwell and Mary, Queen of Scots, and was said to have influenced them by witchcraft.

== Rough Wooing ==
After the death of James V in 1542, Scott was among those who opposed the proposed marriage of the infant Mary, Queen of Scots, to Henry VIII's son Prince Edward, and became active in the wars with England later known as The Rough Wooing. He was made Keeper of Newark Castle for nineteen years in 1543. In 1545, Scott was forced by Arran and Angus to fight against an English force, that had desecrated tombs at Melrose Abbey, at the Battle of Ancrum Moor. Though a victory for the Scots, later that year English forces would return to destroy Melrose Abbey.

Scott also fought in the Battle of Pinkie Cleugh on 10 September 1547. Following the Scottish defeat, Scott submitted to Edward VI, now king of England, with the consent of the Regent, Governor Arran, but in 1548 the English took and burned Newark. Scott's mother, Elizabeth Kerr, was burned to death when the tower of Catslack was fired by the English on 19 October 1548.

In 1550 Scott was made Warden of the Middle Marches, and in 1551 Warden and Justiciar of Liddesdale.

== Murder ==
Scott was walking in the High Street of Edinburgh on 4 October 1552 when a band of Kerrs and their retainers attacked him. John Hume of Coldenknowes ran Scott through with his sword, "shouting to one of the Kerrs 'Strike! Ain strike for they [sic] father's sake!'", and when the wounded Scott was found to be alive his body was repeatedly stabbed until he died.

He was succeeded by his grandson, also called Sir Walter Scott (d. 1574), son of William Scott of Kincurd and father of Sir Walter Scott, 1st Lord Scott of Buccleuch, the "Bold Buccleuch" (1565–1611).

== Representation in fiction ==
Scott plays a significant role in the historical fiction series the Lymond Chronicles by Dorothy Dunnett. He appears in the first novel of the series, The Game of Kings and his death is a key plot point in the third novel of the series, The Disorderly Knights.
