= Creich, Fife =

Hamlet in Fife, Scotland

Coordinates: 56.37874°N 3.08893°W

Creich (Scottish Gaelic: Craoich, pronounced [kʰɾɯːç]; OS: Criech), is a hamlet in Fife, Scotland.

The local parish is named after Creich. The ruins of Creich Castle are located nearby. The ruins of Parbroath Castle are also in Criech parish.

The civil parish has a population of 190 (in 2011).

The name of the village derives from Scottish Gaelic but is obscure in its current form. It may derive from creachann meaning a rocky, treeless summit.
