= Clan Scott =

Scottish clan

- Scotach
- Crest: A stag trippant, encircled in a leather strap inscribed with the chief’s motto "Amo" meaning "I Love".
- Motto: Amo (I love)
- War cry: 'a Bellendaine! ("To Bellendaine!") Also, "The Scotts are out!"

Profile
- Region: Scottish Borders
- Plant badge: Blaeberry

Chief
- Richard Walter John Montagu Douglas Scott
- The 10th Duke of Buccleuch and the 12th Duke of Queensberry
- Seat: Bowhill House
- Historic seat: Dalkeith Palace
Septs of Clan Scott
Buccleuch, Geddes, Laidlaw, Langlands
Clan branches
Scott of Buccleuch (chiefs)
Scott of Synton (senior cadets) (Note: From who descend the Lords Polwarth.)
Scott of Harden (Note: Notable members of this branch include both Walter Scott of Harden the Border Reiver and Walter Scott the Scottish historical novelist.)
Rival clans
Clan Kerr
Clan Douglas
Clan Eliott

Clan Scott is a Scottish clan and is recognised as such by the Lord Lyon King of Arms. Historically the clan was based in the Scottish Borders.

== History ==
=== Origins ===
The Latin word Scotti was originally used to describe the Celts of Ireland. However the historian George Fraser Black notes in his Surnames of Scotland that the earliest certain record of the name was that of Uchtred 'Filius Scott', in a charter from around 1120.

In 1195 Henricus le Scotte witnessed a charter by David, Earl of Strathearn. At the beginning of the thirteenth century a Master Isaac Scotus witnessed charters by the Bishop of St Andrews.

Michael Scott "The Wizard" (1175 – c.1232) was a real-life scholar and philosopher, whom Walter Scott described in The Lay of the Last Minstrel as "addicted to the abstruse studies of judicial astrology, alchemy, physiognomy, and chiromancy. Hence he passed among his contemporaries for a skilful magician".

Four generations after Uchtred, Sir Richard Scott married the heiress of Murthockstone and in doing so acquired her estates. Sir Richard was appointed as the ranger of Ettrick Forest and this brought to him the additional lands of Rankilburn. The new laird built his residence at Buccleuch and the estates were generally known by this name.

=== Wars of Scottish Independence ===
Sir Richard's son, Sir Michael Scott the second Laird of Buccleuch was a staunch supporter of Robert the Bruce during the Wars of Scottish Independence. Michael distinguished himself at the Battle of Halidon Hill in 1333, being one of the few that escaped the carnage. However he was later killed at the Battle of Durham in 1346. Michael left two sons: Robert Scott, the third laird and John Scott who founded the important cadet branch of the clan, the Scotts of Synton from whom the Lords Polwarth descend. Robert Scott died in about 1389, probably from wounds received at the Battle of Otterburn.

=== 15th and 16th centuries ===
Robert Scott, fifth of Buccleuch succeeded to the family estates in 1402 after his father, Walter, was killed in battle. In 1420 he acquired half of the lands of Branxholme, consolidating the family estates. He was active in supporting the Crown in the struggle to suppress the power of the Clan Douglas. When the king's cause prevailed Scott was rewarded with tracts of Douglas land. In 1463 Branxholme became a free barony on the annual payment of a red rose to the Crown on the feast day of St John the Baptist.

The Scotts had become one of the most powerful of all the Border clans by the end of the fifteenth century and the chief could call upon a thousand spears to support him. Like most of the Border Reiver clans the Scotts quarrelled with their neighbours, in particular the Clan Kerr. The feud began on 25 July 1526 when Sir Walter Scott of Buccleuch launched an attack (the Battle of Melrose) to rescue the young James V of Scotland who was being held by the Douglas Earl of Angus at Darnick just west of Melrose, and in the ensuing fight Kerr of Cessford was killed. Sir Walter Scott was also wounded in the action. Scott later fought against the English at the Battle of Pinkie Cleugh and four years later was appointed warden of Liddesdale and the Middle Marches. The Kerrs however were biding their time and in 1552 they set upon Sir Walter Scott on Edinburgh High Street and killed him. The feud came to an end when Sir Thomas Kerr of Ferniehirst married Janet Scott who was the sister of the tenth Laird of Buccleuch.

In 1565 a deadly feud arose between the Clan Scott and their neighbours the Clan Eliott. Scott of Buccleuch executed four Eliotts for the minor crime of cattle rustling. In response three hundred Eliotts rode to avenge the fate of their kinsmen and during the battle losses on both sides were heavy but eventually the two clans came to terms with each other.

The tenth Laird of Buccleuch was a staunch supporter of Mary, Queen of Scots. His son, another Walter Scott went on to become a daring military leader who was known as "Bold Buccleuch". In 1596 he rescued his vassal, William Armstrong, who was known as "Kinmont Willy", from the Fortress of Carlisle which had been thought to be impregnable.

=== 17th century and civil war ===
James VI of Scotland's accession to the English throne was followed by a royal policy to pacify the Borders. Walter Scott, 1st Lord Scott of Buccleuch therefore sought adventure fighting on the Continent for the Prince of Orange in the Netherlands. His son was Walter Scott, 2nd Lord Scott of Buccleuch who commanded a regiment for the States of Holland against the Spanish. In 1619 he was advanced to the rank of Earl of Buccleuch.

During the Scottish Civil War, Francis Scott, 2nd Earl of Buccleuch supported the National Covenant and opposed Charles I of England's religious policies. Scott led his cavalry against the royalist, James Graham, 1st Marquis of Montrose at the Battle of Philiphaugh.

Francis Scott, 2nd Earl of Buccleuch died in 1651 and was succeeded by his four-year-old daughter, Mary Scott, 3rd Countess of Buccleuch. The General Assembly for the Church of Scotland allowed Mary to be married at the age of just eleven but she died aged just fourteen. She was succeeded by her sister, Ann Scott, who was considered one of the greatest heiresses in the kingdom. Charles II of England arranged for Anne Scott to marry his illegitimate son, James, Duke of Monmouth who as a result of the marriage assumed the surname Scott. On the day of their marriage the couple were created Duke and Duchess of Buccleuch. Monmouth later rose up in rebellion against the Crown and as a result he was executed in 1685 and his titles were forfeited. However, as Anne Scott had been specifically created Duchess of Buccleuch her titles were unaffected. She was succeeded by her grandson, Francis Scott, 2nd Duke of Buccleuch.

=== 18th century and Jacobite risings ===
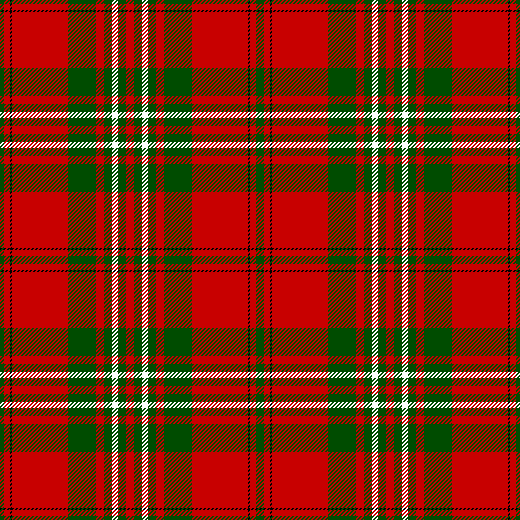
Scott tartan, as published in 1842 in Vestiarium Scoticum.

Several Scotts fought for the government during the Jacobite rising of 1745. Captain John Scott commanded two companies of Royal Scots was defeated and taken prisoner at the Highbridge Skirmish in August 1745. During the action Scott had lost a sergeant and up to six men killed. Scott himself was wounded but the Jacobite MacDonald of Keppoch arranged for his wound to be dressed at Cameron of Lochiel's Achnacarry Castle.

Captain Caroline Frederick Scott of Guise's Regiment commanded the successful defence of Fort William in March 1746. He gained a reputation for brutality and has been described as one of the most notorious 'Redcoats' of the Rebellion. One story alleges three Highlanders who surrendered to him were drowned in a mill flume at Lochoy, although there is no independent confirmation of this.

== Duke of Buccleuch collection ==
The Duke of Buccleuch today is one of the largest private landowners in the United Kingdom, and the internationally famous art collection known as the Duke of Buccleuch collection is held at the family's great houses of Drumlanrig, Bowhill, and Boughton.

== Chief ==
- Clan Chief: Richard Walter John Montagu Douglas Scott, The 10th Duke of Buccleuch, Duke of Queensberry, Marquess of Dumfriesshire, Earl of Buccleuch, Earl of Doncaster, Earl of Dalkeith, Earl of Drumlanrig and Sanquhar, Viscount of Nith, Torthorwald and Ross, Lord Scott of Buccleuch, Lord Scott of Whitchester and Eskdaill, Baron Scott of Tindale, Lord Douglas of Kilmount, Middlebie and Dornock.

== Castles and significant Scott properties ==
- Abbotsford House near Melrose, on the south bank of the River Tweed. It was the residence of historical novelist and poet, Sir Walter Scott.
- Aikwood Tower was built in 1535. The building was restored as a residence in the 1990s by the Liberal politician Lord Steel.
- Boughton House is a country house in Northamptonshire, England, which belongs to the Duke of Buccleuch.
- Bowhill House was purchased in 1747, by Francis Scott, 2nd Duke of Buccleuch, for his son Lord Charles Scott. It remains the Borders residence of the current Duke of Buccleuch.
- Branxholme Castle has been owned by the Clan Scott since 1420.
- Dalkeith Palace in Dalkeith, Midlothian, Scotland, is the former seat of the Duke of Buccleuch.
- Drumlanrig Castle in situated on the Queensberry Estate in Dumfries and Galloway, Scotland is owned by the Duke of Buccleuch.
- Dryhope Tower belonged to the Scotts of Dryhope and now belongs to the Philiphaugh Estate.
- Goldielands Tower, near Hawick the property of Goldieland was acquired in 1446 by Sir Walter Scott of Buccleuch, the tower dates from Walter Scot of Goldielands who was one of the band that rescued Kinmont Willie from Carlisle Castle in 1596.
- Harden House, made famous by Walter Scott of Harden it remains home of Lord and Lady Polwarth of the Scotts of Harden. The first laird of Harden, William Scott, acquired the estate from Lord Home in 1501.
- Kirkhope Tower came into the possession of Anne Scott, 1st Duchess of Buccleuch, widow of the Duke of Monmouth in the early 18th century.
- Newark Castle, a ruined tower house is located on the Bowhill Estate dates from around 1423.
- Murdostoun Castle was built by the Scott family in the 15th century. In 1296 Richard le Scott of the Buccleugh family became Feudal Lord of the property of Murdostoun (also Murthockston) by marriage. On 23 July 1446, Sir Walter Scott acquired the remaining lands of the Barony of Brankolm (also Branxholme) from Thomas Inglis in exchange for the lands of Murdostoun.
- Scotstarvit Tower was bought, in 1611 and rebuilt in the 1620s by Sir John Scott of Scotstarvet.
- Smailholm Tower, a fifteenth-century Pringle stronghold which was eventually acquired by the Scotts of Harden.

== See also ==
- Walter Scott of Harden
- Scottish clan
- Montgomery Scott
