= Creich Castle =

Castle in Fife, Scotland

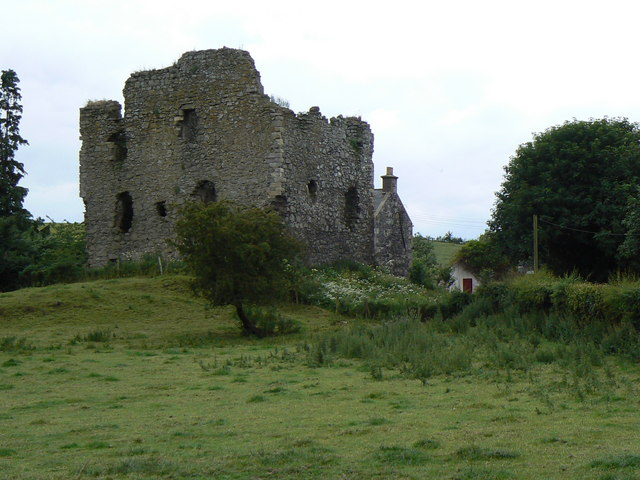
- Ruins of Creich Castle
- Interactive map of Creich Castle
- 56.37885°N 3.08872°W
- Type: Castle
- Location: Creich, Fife, Scotland
- OS grid reference: NO 32863 21261

History
- Built: 11th century
- Built by: Earl of Fife

Site notes
- Material: Stone
- Condition: Ruined
- Public access: Yes

Scheduled monument
- Official name: Creich Castle
- Designated: 23 July 1935
- Reference no.: SM848

Creich Castle is a ruined tower house near Creich, Fife, Scotland. The tower house and its associated buildings is a scheduled monument. There is a mention of a castle on the property in the 13th century, but it is uncertain what relationship that has to the existing structures. There is documentary evidence of a tower in 1553, but the existing structure either postdates that or has been heavily remodelled, judging by its architectural style.

== History ==
The first surviving records that mention Creich show that it was held by the MacDuff, Earls of Fife and they were probably the builders of the first Creich Castle. The land was subsequently owned by the Liddel family until they forfeited it when charged with treason. The Beaton family purchased it in 1503 and the property has been linked with David Betoun of Creich, Cardinal David Beaton, a 16th century Archbishop of St Andrews, and Mary Bethune. The existing ruins date from the 16th century.

== Description ==
The castle is 1.7 km (1.1 mi) south of the River Tay and is located in a depression surrounded by higher ground on all sides. The lower ground immediately surrounding the tower complex was formerly marsh, some of which still survives, which would have improved its defensibility. The tower house is L-shaped (39 feet 2 inches (11.9 m) by 27 feet 8 inches (8.4 m)). The main block is three storeys tall, although the 20-by-20-foot (6.1 by 6.1 m) wing has a height of four storeys. The walls are whin rubble with ashlar dressings. Over the stair tower is a heavily corbelled cornice for the parapet walk. The upper floors are inaccessible and in bad repair. "All the characteristics of the structure...suggest a date rather later than the first half of the 16th century, although the 'tower, fortalice and manor' are recorded in a charter of 1553."

The tower was likely enclosed in a courtyard as there are the remains of a small round tower 20 yards (18 m) west typical of those found at gateways or, less frequently, barmkins. The nearby Creich Castle Doocot or dovecote, dating to 1723, is category A listed. It is rectangular in shape with two interior chambers.

== See also ==
- Scheduled monuments in Fife
