= James Douglas of Spott =

James Douglas of Spott (died 1615) was a Scottish landowner and conspirator.

Arms of James Douglas of Spott

== Career ==
He was a son of James Douglas, 4th Earl of Morton, the Regent Morton. He was appointed Prior of Pluscarden in 1577 by his father, and given a lease of lead mines in Cunningham, Carrick, and Galloway, shared with Lord Glamis. When Morton was arrested and taken to Dumbarton Castle in January 1581, James Douglas was one of his relatives forbidden from travelling or coming to Edinburgh where the former Regent's trial would be held. He came to Carlisle in March 1581 and was taken into protection by Henry, Lord Scrope.

== The feud over the lands of Spott ==
He married Anna Hume, daughter of George Hume of Spott and Jean Hamilton in 1577. The lands and tower-house of Spott are in East Lothian. The old Laird of Spott, George Hume, was shot through the head with a pistol by passing horsemen in September 1591. The horsemen were said to be Humes of Ayton, apparently enraged by the king's favour to the Sir George Home son of the laird of Manderston. One report described Sir George Home as one of the king's "new upstart made courtiers". He was convinced that James Douglas had ordered the killing.

David Hume of Godscroft explained the background of this feud. He wrote that Alexander Hume of Manderston was married to the old laird's sister Jean, and the courtier Sir George Home, later Earl of Dunbar, was the nephew of the murdered laird. The old laird of Spott had been fond of Sir George Home and he might have married his heiress Anna Hume. This marriage plan was spoiled by an argument with John Cockburn son of the Laird of Ormiston about some lands and crops. Cockburn married Sir George Home's sister Janet and the old laird of Spott came to the wedding in July 1574 to complain. He was not satisfied with the Laird of Manderston's answer and resolved not to have his daughter marry Sir George Home, and went to Regent Morton and arranged the marriage with his son James Douglas. The Manderston family were disappointed and held a grudge.

Francis Stewart, 5th Earl of Bothwell also had a history with the Homes of Manderston, and had threatened to punch David Home, a brother of Sir George Home, at Linlithgow in November 1583.

== Rebel against James VI ==
Sir George Home was said by historians, including Robert Johnston and John Spottiswoode, to have pursued James Douglas of Spott for the murder of the old laird of Spott, and some of Spott's servants were arrested and imprisoned in Holyrood Palace. This led to the laird becoming involved with the rebel Earl of Bothwell, who wanted to break into the palace and gain the king's presence.

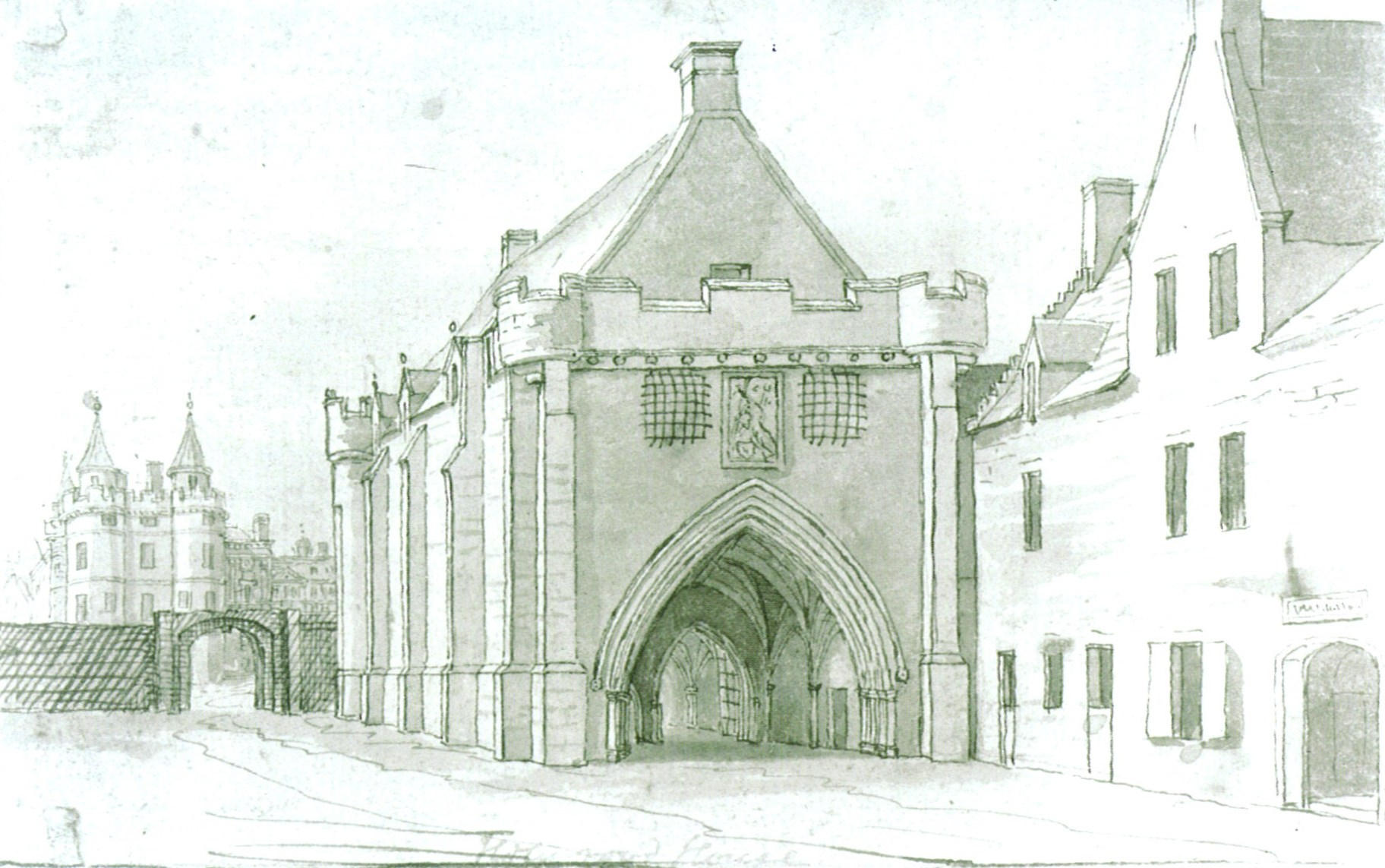
James Douglas joined the Earl of Bothwell to rescue his servants from torture in the gatehouse of Holyrood Palace

According to Sir James Melville of Halhill who was a gentleman in the household of Anne of Denmark, the Laird of Spott was involved in Bothwell's attack on Holyrood Palace with Archibald Wauchope of Niddrie, John Colville, Archibald Douglas (son of the Earl of Morton) and around sixty others after supper on 27 December 1591. Spott went to release some of his servants that were imprisoned in the gatehouse or "porter lodge" on suspicion of the murder of his "gudefather", the old laird of Spott. They had been tortured with the "boot", a device for crushing the legs. This action raised the alarm more quickly than Bothwell's party wanted. While the king and the court barricaded themselves inside the palace helped by Harry Lindsay of Kinfauns, Andrew Melville of Garvock brought help from outside.

The English ambassador Robert Bowes wrote that two of Spott's servants were captured and imprisoned in the gatehouse at Holyrood Palace and one was tortured on Christmas Day with the "boot". Another contemporary account mentions that Spott could not rescue the Laird of "Cumbadge", whose legs had been crushed, and suggests he had joined Bothwell because of the ill-treatment of his servants. The author of the Historie of King James the Sext said that Spott came only to free his accused servants and named the man crippled by torture as "Affleck of Cumlachie", adding that Spott came to the palace before supper and spoke with Chancellor, John Maitland of Thirlestane and, perhaps, forewarned him. Spottiswoode wrote the Chancellor had spoken against the torture of the servants, but the king insisted on it. Spottiswoode said that Sir James Sandilands rather than Andrew Melville was the courtier who brought help.

David Home of Godscroft mentions that Archibald Auchinleck or Affleck, brother of George Auchinleck of Balmanno, married the daughter of "Sleigh of Cumblege", Sleich of Cumlege in the Merse, and this man was undoubtedly the man whose legs were crushed in the gatehouse. Like his friend the laird of Spott, he had been ordered to stay away from Morton's trial in 1581. His neighbours of the Home surname had not welcomed him, and he had complained of various aggressions to the Privy Council in October 1585.

More suspects for the murder of the old laird of Spott were found in England and taken to Berwick, news which pleased Sir George Home. The prisoners escaped into Scotland, with the help of Archibald Douglas.

Spott fled to the English border in March 1592 hoping to be assisted by his old friends, but had to write to Archibald Douglas for help and claimed members of the house of Manderston had worked against him. Spott was attainted of treason in the Parliament of Scotland on 7 June with a number of Bothwell's followers including Hercules Stewart and Archibald Wauchope of Niddrie. The king gave his lands were given to Sir George Home on 10 June.

On 27 June 1592 Spott joined Bothwell's attack on Falkland Palace, but they were unable to reach James VI and Anne of Denmark who remained safely in the gatehouse tower. There was a rumour that Spott had been shot dead at Falkland.

In September 1592 Spott was reported to be at Drumlanrig Castle and discussing the Earl of Bothwell's plans with Maitland. The English ambassador Robert Bowes heard discussions in October that Bothwell might be better off without the Laird of Spott and be more readily accepted into the king's favour if he "shook him off", since this would please other courtiers. In August 1593 James VI made a move to rehabilitate James Douglas, by sending the master of work William Schaw to Sir George Home to charge him to deliver Spott to James Douglas. Bowes heard that this move would be resisted and nothing done before Parliament or the convention.

In November 1594 James VI wrote to Robert Bowes, who was in Berwick, to complain that Spott and Thomas Cranstoun, who had increased his troubles with the Catholic earls, were residing in England at Wark, Twizel, Cornhill, and Brackenhill, and hoped Bowes could have them arrested. Brackenhill was the home of Richie Graham, who had been at the Raid of Falkland. Spott had gone to London and wrote to William Dundas of Fingask in Latin in reply to his letter written in Latin, which was unusual for Spott.

In February 1595 the English diplomat George Nicholson heard that Hercules Stewart said his brother, the Earl of Bothwell, blamed Spott for involving him with the Catholic earls. Hercules Stewart alleged that Spott was guilty of the murder of his father-in-law. James VI excommunicated Bothwell and Spott, following the testimony of James Scott of Balwearie, for being at Menmuir where the rebel earls made a band. Sir George Home told Nicholson in October 1595 that he was not making terms of agreement with Spott.

In May 1595 James VI gave Sir George Home (now "of Spott") the forfeit or escheat of John Home, younger brother of George Home of Wedderburn, who was accused of the murder of the old laird of Spott. In September 1595 Archibald Douglas wrote that Spott could travel to France to meet the exiled Earl of Bothwell and dissuade him from conspiring with Spain. In March 1597 he attempted to intervene in the Kinmont Willie border affair. In November 1599 he travelled to the English court from Carlisle carrying a letter of introduction from Thomas Scrope, 10th Baron Scrope of Bolton.

== Rehabilitation ==
He was reconciled with the king and Sir George Home, who was now treasurer of Scotland, in January 1603. George Nicholson thought this was connected with moves to rehabilitate the Earl of Bothwell. King James made him chamberlain of Dunbar on 13 April 1603, and in March the Privy Council issued letters forgiving him and "relaxing him from the horn" for his participation with Bothwell at the raids of Holyrood, Falkland, and Leith.

Douglas complained to the Privy Council in June 1603 about a piece of unused land near Dunbar Castle which the king had recently granted to him after his "long banishment". A lawyer Arthur Straiton had made some difficulties fees for the official privy seal documents. The lands of Spott were made into a free barony in August 1605.

In July 1610 "James Douglas of Spott" was described as a gentleman of the king's privy chamber and made a denizen of England. He was granted lands in Clancarney in County Armagh. However, George Hill identifies this man as another James Douglas of Spott, who was a son of Malcolm Douglas of Mains in Dunbartonshire and page and master of horse to Prince Henry.

James Douglas of Spott, sometime conspirator with the Earl of Bothwell, died in 1615.

== Marriages and family ==
He married Anna Hume, daughter of George Hume of Spott. His children included

- Archibald Douglas of Spott, his heir.
- Christian Douglas (d. 1615), who married John Auchmoutie of Scoughall.
- Archibald Douglas of Grene
- Margaret Douglas, who married John Tweedy younger of Dreva
- Elizabeth Douglas
