= Raid of Holyrood =

The Raid of Holyrood was an attack on Holyrood Palace, Edinburgh on 27 December 1591 by Francis Stewart, 5th Earl of Bothwell in order to gain the favour of King James VI of Scotland. Bothwell subsequently staged a raid at Falkland Palace, and in July 1593 made another attempt at Holyrood.

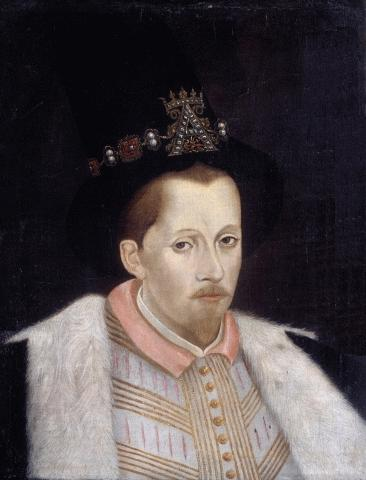
Francis Stewart, Earl of Bothwell wanted to get exclusive access to James VI, portrait by Adrian Vanson

== Background ==
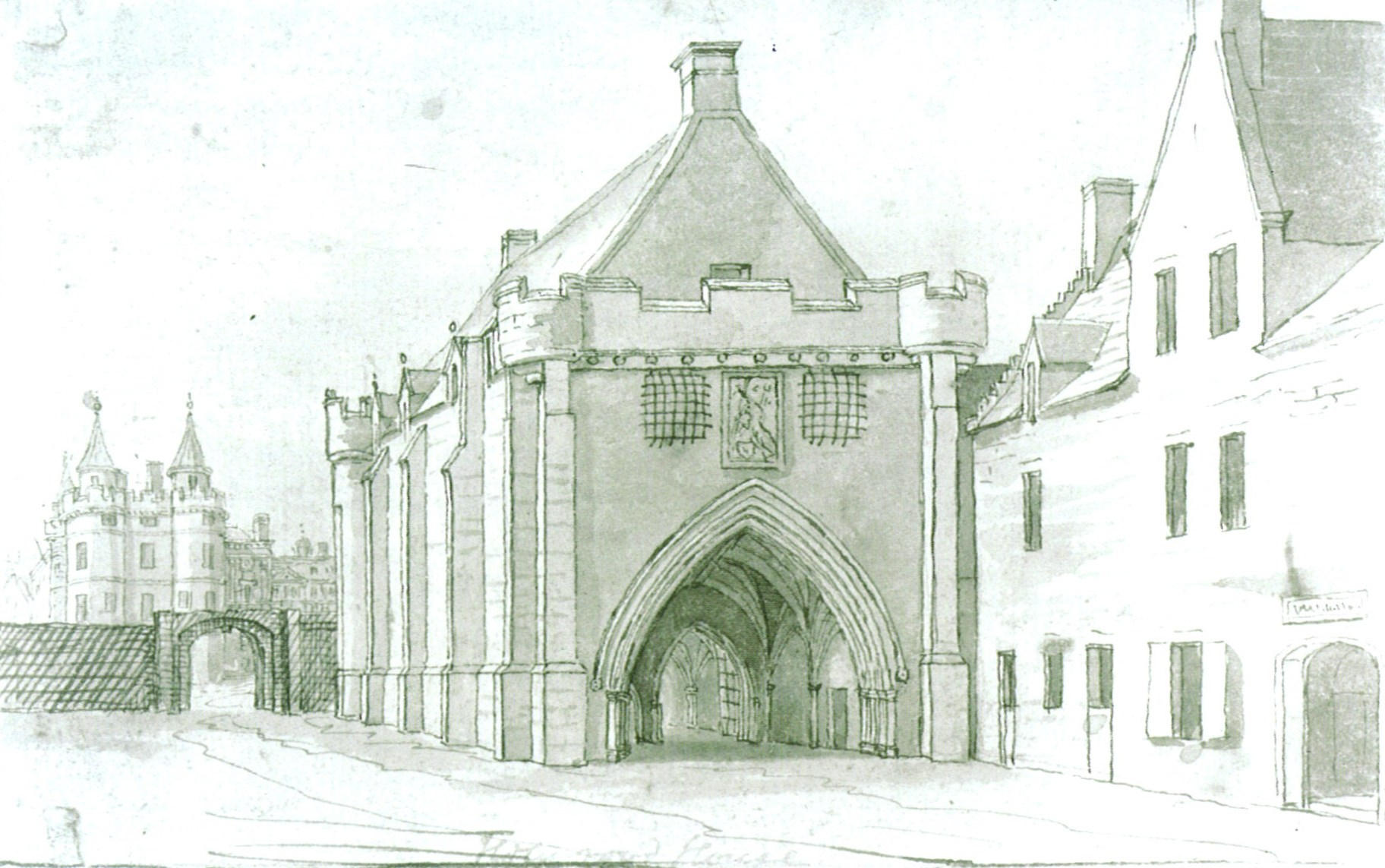
James Douglas of Spott rescued his servants from torture in the gatehouse of Holyrood Palace

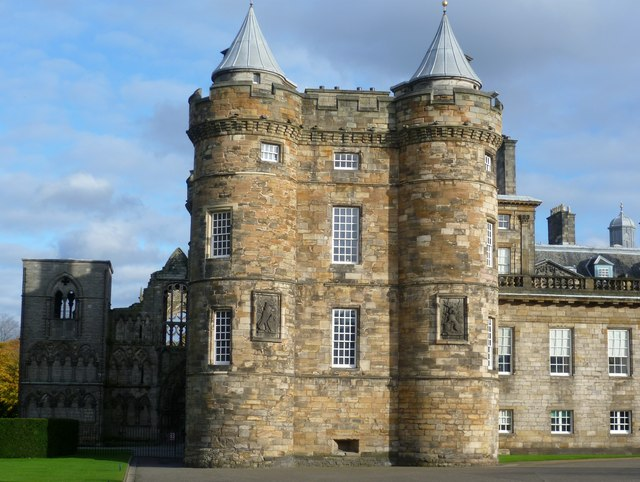
James VI barricaded himself in the tower built by his grandfather James V

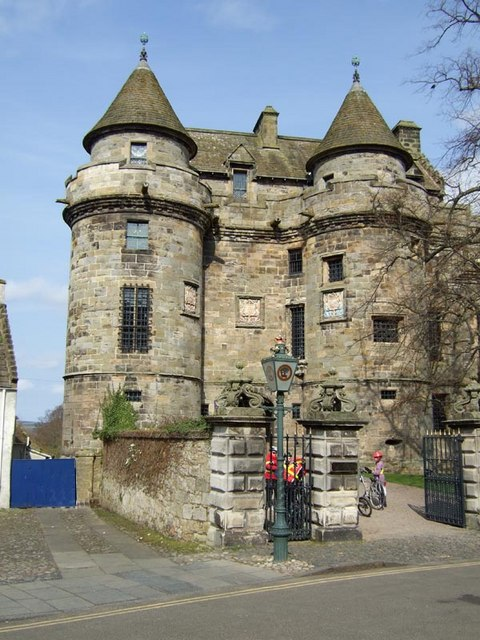
James VI barricaded himself in the tower built by his grandfather James V at Falkland Palace

Francis Stewart, Earl of Bothwell was a nephew of Mary, Queen of Scots. He fell from the favour of James VI and was accused of witchcraft during the North Berwick witch trials. Expelled from court, he broke into Holyrood Palace (twice) and tried to capture Falkland Palace (once) and planned to enter Dalkeith Palace, either to regain the King's favour or to kidnap him. Bothwell could count on a number of loyal followers amongst the Scottish lairds. Despite his following, he was forced into exile and died in Naples in 1612.

There was an alleged plot to seize James VI at Holyrood back in December 1582. Robert Bowes was told that Alexander Stewart and others intended to destabilize the Ruthven regime, an English-leaning Scottish government, and return Esmé Stewart, 1st Duke of Lennox to power at the Scottish court. The conspirators would surprise the king during supper. The raiders would enter the palace through the Abbey, using the "dark stair" into a long gallery, then access the "little gallery" under the king's lodging when his attendants were eating elsewhere. The palace porter John Bog would give them keys. Some of the alleged conspirators were arrested and Bowes was told that they were shown the "boot", an instrument of torture, in order to make them talk.

== First raid on Holyrood, December 1591 ==
Sir James Melville of Halhill, a gentleman in the household of Anne of Denmark, the courtier Roger Aston, and the English ambassador Robert Bowes, described the first raid on Holyrood Palace. Bothwell came with sixty followers after supper on Monday 27 December 1591, including the lairds James Douglas of Spott, Archibald Wauchope of Niddrie, John Colville, and Archibald Douglas (a son of the Earl of Morton).

Douglas of Spott went to release some of his servants that were imprisoned in the gatehouse or "porter lodge" on suspicion of the murder of the old laird of Spott. The space was originally a workshop for a glazier, Thomas Peebles and James V had converted it into a workshop for mending the royal tapestries. Now it was a prison where one man, Sleich of Cumlege in the Merse, had been tortured with the "boot", a device for crushing the legs, on Christmas Day. Spott's action raised the alarm more quickly than Bothwell's party wanted. The king and his courtiers barricaded themselves inside the palace helped by Harry Lindsay of Kinfauns, while Andrew Melville of Garvock and Sir James Sandilands brought help from outside.

James VI and Anne of Denmark retreated to the tower of the palace, while most of the court were still at supper in the great hall. Accorded to Roger Aston they "ram-forst the dores" against Bothwell's men until help came from the people of Edinburgh. Bothwell's men tried to break through with hammers and burn doors. The Chancellor John Maitland of Thirlestane was besieged in his chamber. Harry Lindsay defended the queen's door. Both the King and Queen were in the tower secured with an iron yett.

A shot from the chancellor's chamber window killed Robert Scott, a brother of the Laird of Balwearie, and another raider was hit on the backside. The courtiers fought back with "staffs and other invasive weapons". Taking advantage of the darkness, Bothwell's men retreated through the stables. Seven of Bothwell's men were captured and hanged. Anne of Denmark successfully pleaded with James VI for the lives of some, especially John Naysmyth.

Following the raid, motivated by the "feir of the erle Bothuell", James VI and Anne of Denmark lodged for a time in the Edinburgh house of a wealthy merchant Nicoll Uddart, which was thought to offer more security than the Palace.

=== The Schaw twins ===
Archibald Wauchope of Niddrie was shot and injured in the hand by John Schaw, a gentleman of the equerry. John Shaw, who had recently been awarded a property confiscated from Euphame MacCalzean, and his twin brother Patrick were fatally injured in the struggle in the stable. Their sister Marjory was awarded a royal pension. The twins were commemorated in a poem by Alexander Montgomerie, the Epitaph of Jhone and Patrik Shaues which compares John and his twin brother Patrick to Castor and Pollux.

By CASTOR and by POLLUX you may boste,
Deid SHAWIS ye live, suppose your lyfis be loste.

=== Suspicions ===
It was said that during the raid Margaret Douglas, Countess of Bothwell, waited in a house nearby in the Canongate with jewels and money, ready to receive the captive queen. She left secretly in the night in fear after the retreat. The Privy Council later banished her from the King's presence, declaring that,

the said Erllis wyffe, quha, as is knowne, hes bene a griter mellair in thir treassounable actionis and counsellis then become a woman; bot, howsoevir his Majestie, in respect of hir sex and present conditioun, thocht nocht convenient to deal so hardlie with hir at this tyme as she had worthelie deservit, yit meanit nocht nor nawayes allow that she sould remane ewest his persone or repair to his presens
Or in modern spelling: the said Earl's wife, who, as is known, has been a greater dealer in these treasonable actions and counsels than becomes a woman; but, however his Majesty, in respect of her sex and present condition [pregnancy], thought it not convenient to deal so hardly with her at this time as she had worthily deserved, yet means not in any way to allow that she should remain near his person or repair to his presence.

Suspicion fell on the Duke of Lennox because one his retainers, William Stewart, took part in the Raid and fled. Newsletters sent around Europe emphasised the role of Colonel William Stewart. Chancellor Maitland distrusted Lennox' offer of a refuge during the Raid. A list of fifty suspected to have been at the Raid of Holyrood includes the Earl's half-brother Hercules Stewart, Robert Hepburn in Hailes, John Ormiston in Smailholm, and John Gibson, the grieve of Crichton, who was taken to the gallows but reprieved. James VI made a proclamation against the masked riders, conspirators who "rydis missellit" with their faces covered and disguised.

Elizabeth I wrote to Anne of Denmark in French to congratulate her on escaping Bothwell's "wicked miserable enterprise" and that she should encourage James VI to punish the offenders and be as vigilant as her father, Frederick II of Denmark had been. In England, Christopher Hatton heard that Bothwell had intended to kill the Chancellor, John Maitland. James VI would now try more seriously to capture Bothwell, and promised his confiscated goods and lands to the Duke of Lennox, to secure his support.

== Raid of Falkland, June 1592 ==
On 28 June, between one and two o'clock in the morning, Bothwell, with 300 followers, attempted to capture Falkland Palace and the king. Forewarned, the king and queen and his immediate courtiers withdrew to the tower and locked it from within. Bothwell's main assault was at the back gate near the tennis court. The defenders fired on his supporters from the tower. Melville of Halhill alleged that some who liked Bothwell loaded their guns with paper, while Bothwell refrained from using the explosive petards he had brought to blow the gates open.

Bothwell gave up and left with the horses from the royal stables. The English border reiver Richie Graham of Brackenhill and his companions including Thomas Musgrave of Bewcastle sacked Falkland town, taking horses, clothing, and money. On 29 and 30 June proclamations were issued for Bothwell's pursuit and the arrest of his accomplices, including James Scott of Balwearie, Martine of Cardone, and Lumsden of Airdrie. An Edinburgh burgess, George Marjoribanks, described the Raid of Falkland in his journal:

after the forfaltour of the said Earl of Bothwell, he with his complices came to Falkland quher [where] the King wes for the tyme, of purpois for to have taken the King from sick [such] as then hade courte and governiment of him, and witheld hes nobility from him. Bot they could get the King taken, in respecte of the strenth of the place.

According to James Melville of Halhill, he and his brother had a warning of the plot to take the King and Queen at Falkland. They advised the royal couple to ride north to Ballinbreich Castle on the River Tay for greater safety. This counsel was overruled and the Melville brothers were told to ride south to summon reinforcements to Falkland. They discovered that Bothwell was close by and sent a servant, Robert Athlek, back to Falkland. His story was not believed. On his way back from Falkland he encountered Bothwell's forces on the Lomond Hills in the dark. He was believed when he came back a second time, and so the royals moved into the gatehouse tower for extra security.

James VI returned to Edinburgh, and wrote to Elizabeth I on 5 July about the raid at Falkland. He would hunt down the perpetrators, and asked her to pursue fugitives in England and the English subjects who were present. He asked her to send money to help, as a payment of the annuity or subsidy which he received from her. A poem or libel commenting on the Falkland raid and denouncing the Earls of Mar and Lennox was subsequently posted on the door of the kirk minister John Cairns.

== Second raid of Holyrood, July 1593 ==
On Tuesday 24 July 1593, the Earl of Bothwell in disguise, helped by Marie Ruthven, Countess of Atholl, smuggled himself into Holyroodhouse and forced himself into the King's presence, in his bedchamber. The Countess of Atholl had access to a back gate which led to her mother, Dorothea Stewart, Countess of Gowrie's house.

It was said that Bothwell hid behind the tapestry or hangings until the best moment. Some accounts say the King was in his "retiring place" or "secret place", with his valet William Murray. According to John Spottiswoode, James VI saw Bothwell's drawn sword, and said, "Strike Traitor! and make an end of thy work, for I desire not to live any longer". Bothwell kneeled and offered his sword to the king so he could behead him if he wished. James declined. Soon numerous Bothwell supporters also entered the room. William Keith of Delny and the Earl of Mar offered some resistance.

Bothwell told his version of this dialogue to William Reed in Berwick-upon-Tweed. When James saw Bothwell, he said "Francis, thou will do me no ill!". Bothwell kneeled and offered his sword. The Duke and the Earl of Atholl came in the room and spoke on Bothwell's behalf, "May it please your grace, this is a noble man of your own blood, who would be loth to see you take any ill, and be ready always to venture his life with you. Your Grace is to take things in hand now which cannot be well done without the assistance of this man who you may be assured of". According to Bothwell, the king forgave him, saying, "Francis, you ask us pardon, for what would you have pardon?" as if his entrance to the palace had been no offence.

The Provost of Edinburgh, Alexander Home, came to the palace to help, but the king said things were fine and Bothwell told him to get packing. Various noblemen were present and Lord Ochiltree offered to fight Bothwell over the issue of the killing of his brother Sir William Stewart in 1588. There was no fighting. The king accepted Bothwell's protestations of loyalty and an agreement for his pardon from charges of treason was reached. Bothwell was never returned to favour and went into exile.

Two Danish ambassadors, Niels Krag and Steen Bille, who had come to inspect the queen's jointure settlement and land rentals, were in Edinburgh during the raid. They were lodged in the Canongate at John Kinloch's house close to the palace. They recorded events in a Latin journal of their embassy. James VI had to explain the circumstances of Bothwell's appearance at Holyrood to them in a meeting with the Privy Council in the Tolbooth. The Danish ambassadors had another audience with James VI in the palace garden on 25 July.

The English ambassador Robert Bowes thought that Marie Ruthven, Countess of Atholl was a dependable ally of Elizabeth I and opposed to the faction of the Earl of Huntly, and in October 1593 he advised that Elizabeth should send her a jewel as a token of support. The king's favourite, Sir George Home, was now lodged in the house by Holyrood, for extra security. Some unjustly accused Anne of Denmark of trying helping Bothwell reach the king.
