= Thomas Musgrave of Bewcastle =

English landowner

Thomas Musgrave, Captain of Bewcastle was an English landowner and soldier involved in Scottish border politics. He was keeper of Bewcastle Castle for Elizabeth I.

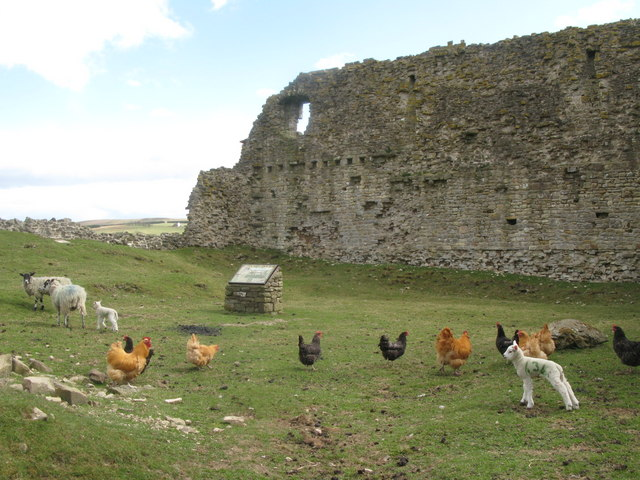
Ruins of Bewcastle Castle

He was a younger son of Sir Simon Musgrave of Hartley and Edenhall (died 1597) and his wife Julian, a daughter of William Ellerker of Ellerker. He was also known as Musgrave of Cumcatch. His father was Constable of Bewcastle and made Thomas his depute as Captain of Bewcastle.

== Border reivers and rebels ==
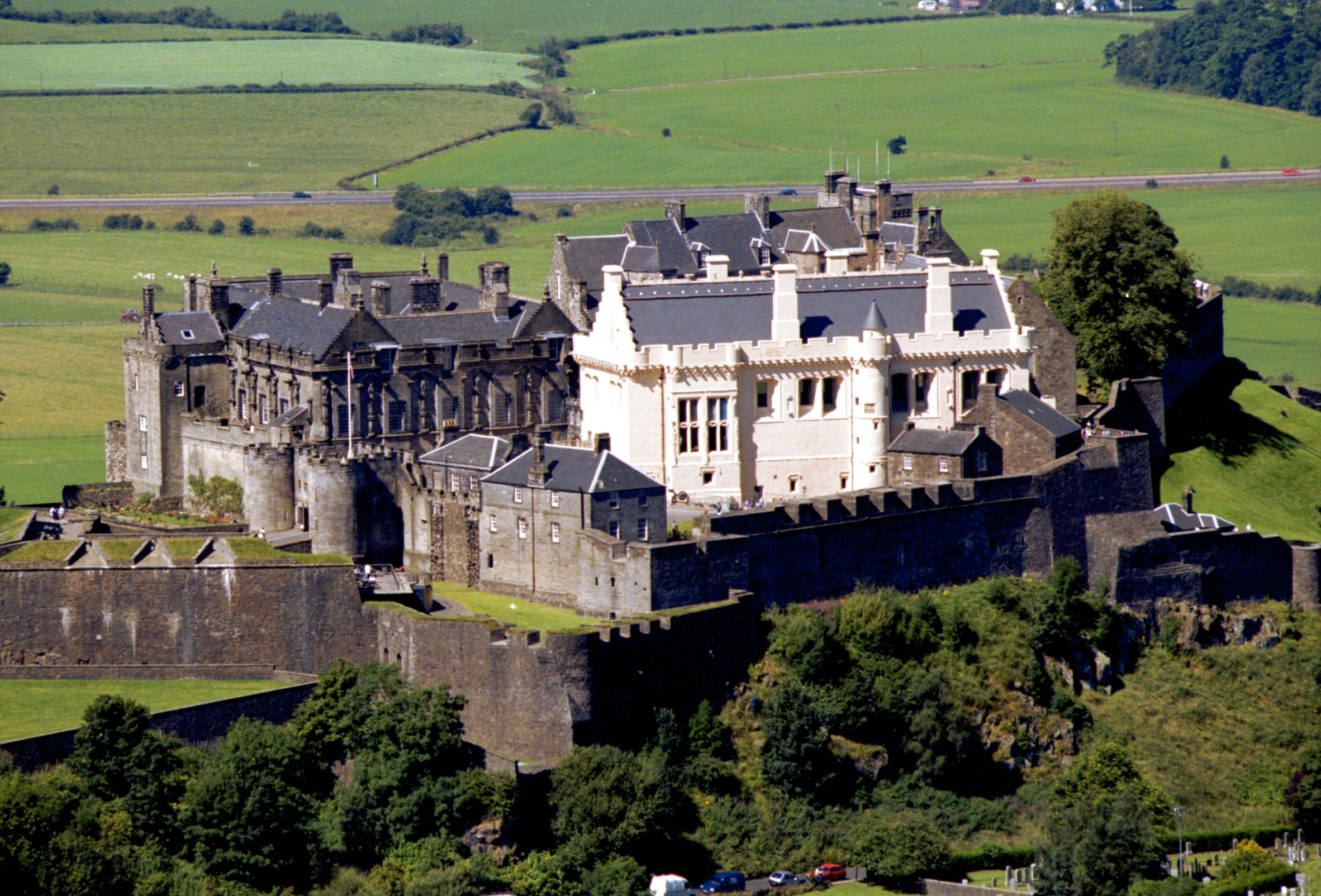
Thomas Musgrave was taken to Stirling Castle in September 1601 to have a drinking session with James VI and watch Prince Henry's exercises

In 1582 his brother Christopher Musgrave captured some members of the Scottish Armstrong family, who were subsequently executed, adding to a cross-border feud and leading to raids on Bewcastle. The Graham and Carleton families joined in, targeting Thomas Musgrave after he killed Arthur Graham in Scotland and stole his cattle. The English border wardens were reluctant to send more troops to reinforce the garrison at Bewcastle in case this escalated tension on the border. In 1583 Thomas Musgrave wrote a description of the Scottish border and family networks on both sides for William Cecil, 1st Baron Burghley. In June 1586 his father had to write to the Council in favour of Thomas continuing in the role of his depute as Captain of Bewcastle, and he was allowed to keep his place.

Musgrave was a friend of the Scottish rebel Francis Stewart, 5th Earl of Bothwell. He supplied a list of the names of Bothwell's followers who besieged James VI of Scotland and Anne of Denmark at Raid of Falkland and was present at Falkland, accused with the English border reiver Richie Graham of Brackenhill and his companions of sacking Falkland town, taking horses, clothing, and money. Musgrave was said to have stolen the king's own horse, "Gray Valentine". He allowed Bothwell to stay with him at Bewcastle after the Raid and during his exile in 1593. Musgrave and other Englishmen were "filed" as border offenders with a large financial penalty for their part in the Raid. He was imprisoned in England for while and continued to correspond with Bothwell, sending his servant John Watson to the Earl. Bothwell hoped Musgrave would be able to secure an interview for one of his agents with Elizabeth I.

The English diplomat in Edinburgh, Robert Bowes, spoke to James VI on Musgrave's behalf, asking that he would write to Elizabeth I for his release. Musgrave was having a difficult time and his wife had recently died. James VI was still angry and expressed some doubt about the demise of Musgrave's wife. He had also heard that one of Musgrave's brothers continued to entertain Bothwell at Bewcastle. In July 1593 the Scottish diplomat Robert Melvile of Murdocairny was instructed to press for the rendition of Musgrave and Cuthbert Armourer, a Northumbrian gentlemen who frequently came to Scotland for the hunting and had also hosted Bothwell in England. Musgrave continued to act as a border warden and upset his commander Lord Scrope by releasing a Scottish reiver called Bungell. Scrope felt Musgrave's actions undermined his authority.

In July 1596 Musgrave was captured, despite trying to find refuge at Brackenhill, and taken into Scotland by Kinmont Willie Armstrong and transferred to royal custody at Hawick. James VI was said to be pleased because Musgrave was a lawful prisoner in comparison with Armstrong's recent detention at Carlisle Castle. He was returned to England after a couple of weeks, during which he met the Laird of Buccleuch, who was unrepentant for his actions in springing Kinmont Willie from Carlisle. Musgrave was released only "on band" and the veteran Scottish border warden Sir John Carmichael requested his return. The incident seems to be part of the basis of a ballad, Jamie Telfer of the Fair Dodhead. In May 1599 Musgrave organised a football match at Bewcastle with six players on each side, England versus Scotland.

Despite the King's anger in 1593, Musgrave came to enjoy a good relationship with James VI of Scotland. An English diplomat George Nicholson reported that he shared "merry cracks" with the king at Stirling Castle in September 1601, and after drinking together in the cellar Musgrave joked about jousting with James if he opposed Elizabeth. They watched Prince Henry dance and wield a pike. Musgrave was in Scotland to deliver a message from Lord Scrope about border issues and his assault of Mangerton Tower. Scrope found the king's response disappointing.

== Judicial combat ==
On 8 April 1602 Musgrave was set to fight in a duel or judicial combat with Lancelot Carleton of Askerton at Canonby Holme. Carleton had accused Musgrave of treason, alleging to the Privy Council of England that he had offered the use of Bewcastle to James VI of Scotland and the place was the resort of thieves and border rebels. The outcome is unknown. It seems that instead of fighting, Musgrave was summoned to London to meet Sir Robert Cecil. The rumour of Musgrave receiving thieves at Bewcastle in breach of his promises came to James again in November, and he declared he would ride to Bewcastle and personally hang Musgrave on the wall of the castle.

Musgrave had possession of lands at Plumpton Park in Hesket in the Forest of Inglewood, formerly regarded as part of Debatable Lands between Scotland and England. After the Union of the Crowns, in May 1605, King James granted these lands to his Scottish favourite John Murray of bedchamber, and Musgrave protested.

== Marriages and family ==
Musgrave married Ursula, a daughter of Sir Reginald Carnaby, widow of Sir Edward Widdrington, and mother of Sir Henry Widdrington. She died in 1592 while Musgrave was imprisoned for his part in the Raid of Falkland. His second wife was Scottish, and her first name is recorded as Susanna.

Susanna's daughter Catherine, described as an heiress of Cumcatch, married Sir Richard Graham (died 1653), son of Fergus Graham of Plump or Plumpton in Cumbria. who was master of horse at court to King James and Charles I, and accompanied Charles and Buckingham during the Spanish Match.

It was rumoured (in 1599) that Musgrave had a daughter who had married a Scottish laird, Sym Armstrong of Whithaugh.
