= Richie Graham =

Richie Graham of Brackenhill (1555–1606) was a prominent Reiver active in late sixteenth century Great Britain.

Richie was the son of Mathew Graham Cumberland. Graham of Mote acquired Brackenhill in Arthuret after 1561. He purchased it from Sir Thomas Dacre. He settled the property on to his third son, Richard or Richie in the 1580s.

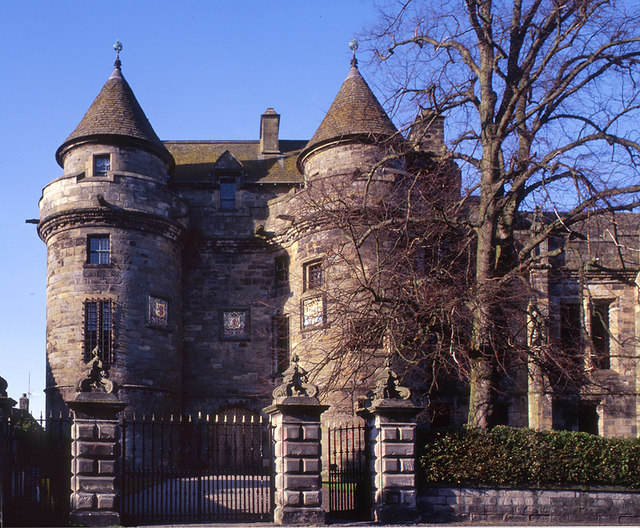
Richie Graham tried to break into Falkland Palace in June 1592

Richie Graham built Brackenhill Tower in 1584 .

On 27 June 1592 he joined the forces of the rebel Francis Stewart, 5th Earl of Bothwell and surrounded and besieged Falkland Palace in Fife while James VI and Anne of Denmark were in residence. Graham and his companions, including Thomas Musgrave, captain of Bewcastle, sacked the town of Falkland and stole 80 horses and clothes and money from the townspeople. After the Raid of Falkland he sheltered the Scottish rebel James Douglas of Spott at Brackenhill.

He aided Lord Buccleuch in springing Kinmont Willie Armstrong from Carlisle Castle in 1596. In June 1596, he was accused of making the queen's tenants pay rent to him, and hosting a coiner making counterfeit money in a dwelling in a mill and in a room in the tower of his own house at Brackenhill.

Richie Graham died in 1606.

Richie Graham can be confused with a contemporary Scottish Richie Graham, who was involved in the North Berwick Witch Trials.
