= Coop House, Netherby =

Building in Cumbria, England

Coop House
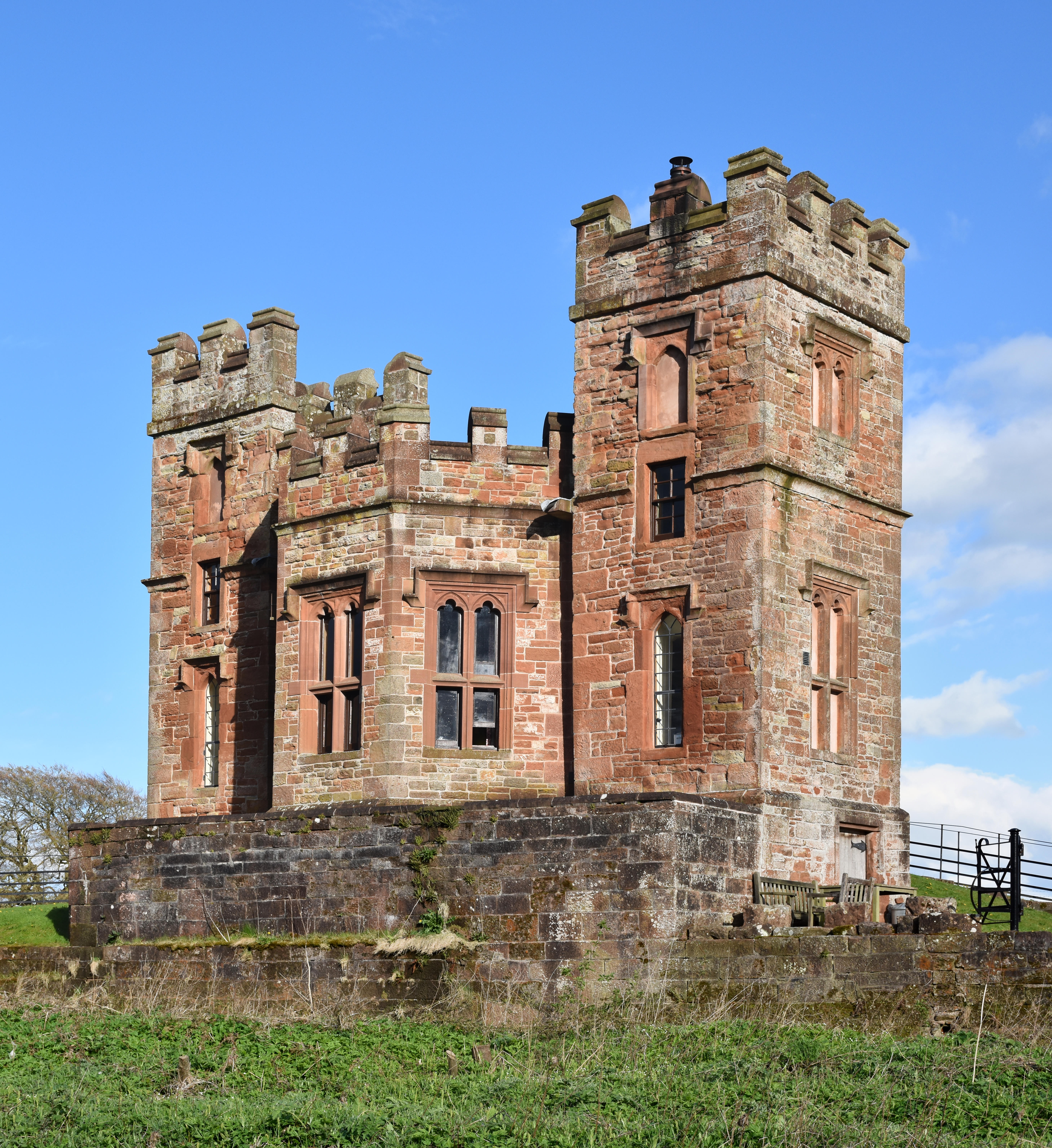
- Viewed from the west
- Interactive map of Coop House
- 55°2′2.400″N 2°57′39.960″W
- Location: Netherby, Cumbria
- OS grid reference: NY 38669 71474

History
- Built: c. 1772

Listed Building – Grade II*
- Designated: 15 June 1984
- Reference no.: 1204976

Coop House, near Netherby in Cumbria, England, is a small building by the River Esk, erected about 1772 as part of a salmon fishery project, and restored in the 1990s by the Landmark Trust. It is a Grade II* listed building; it is described in the listing as a folly tower.

== History and description ==
It is situated on the south bank of the River Esk and west of Netherby Hall. The Revd Robert Graham of Netherby Hall made many improvements to his estate, and endeavoured to establish a salmon fishery, which involved building a weir in the river in 1770, and creating coops, which may have been holding pens for the fish. Coop House was built about 1772, probably as a vantage point for the salmon fishery. The weir collapsed in floods; an improved version designed by the civil engineer James Brindley also collapsed in 1782.

The building is of red sandstone, and it originally consisted of one room with a projecting bay to view the river. Sir James Graham in the early 19th century added the flanking towers, each with a tall room on the ground floor and a small room above.

After the failure of the weir it is thought to have been usually unoccupied. From the late 19th century it was a cottage for estate workers; in the 1930s it was a home for a shepherd and his family. It was later vacated, and by the 1980s it was collapsing. In 1992, the Landmark Trust obtained a lease for the property from Sir Charles Graham, and from 1994 there was restoration, directed by the architect Rosalind Taylor. It is now a holiday let.

== See also ==
- Listed buildings in Arthuret
