= William Dundas of Fingask =

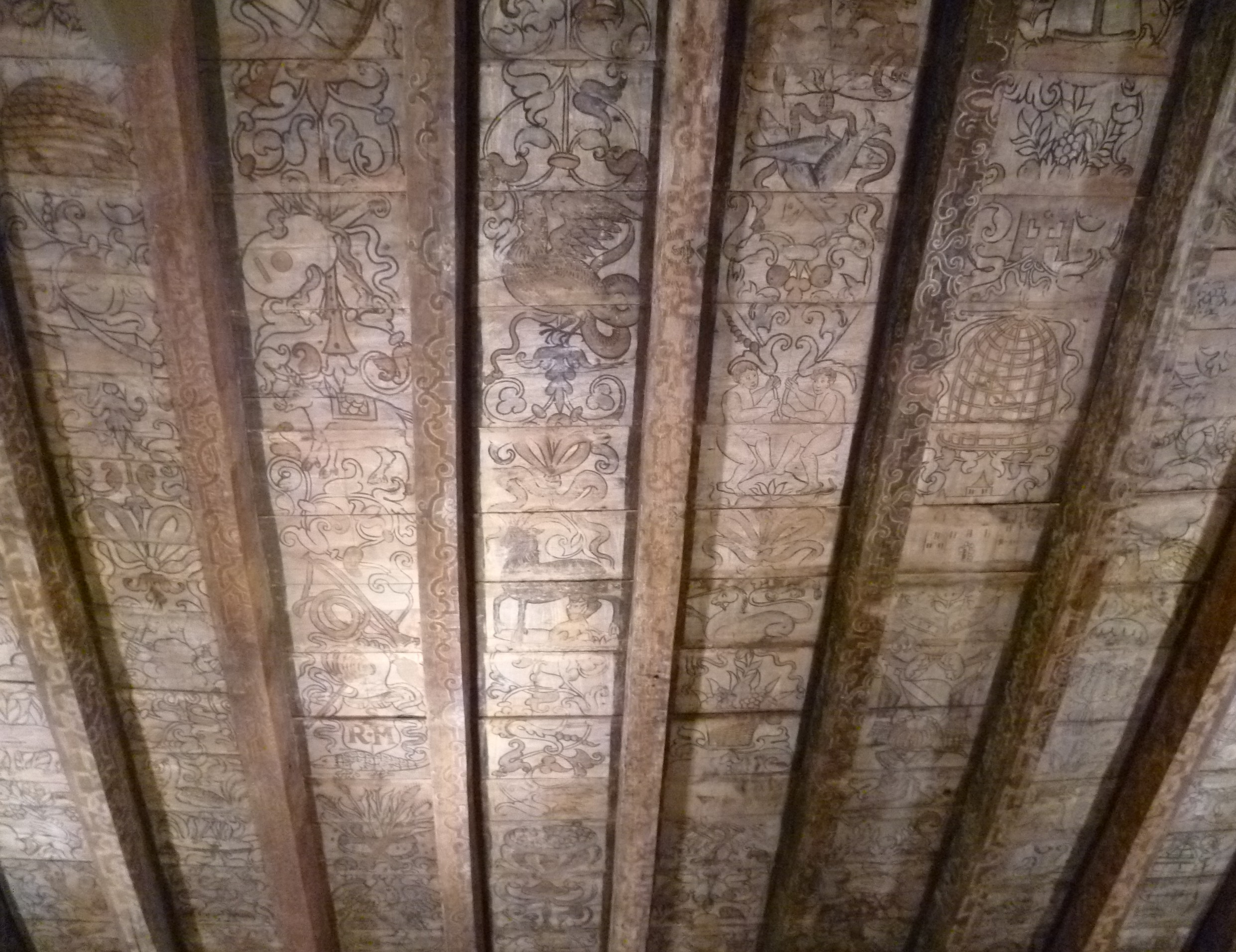
In the 1590s Scottish houses were decorated with painted emblems. Ceiling from the house of the diplomat Robert Melville, National Museum of Scotland

William Dundas of Fingask (died 1599), was a Scottish courtier who wrote newsletters.

William Dundas was a son of Archibald Dundas of Fingask and Elizabeth Colville, daughter of Robert Colville of Cleish.

His sister Margaret Dundas married George Douglas of Mordington, a son of George Douglas of Parkhead. A niece, Nicholas Dundas, married Alexander Colville (d. 1597), commendator of Culross.

He married Margaret Carnegie, a daughter of David Carnegie of Colluthie in 1582.

In 1590 William Dundas wrote to Mr Archibald Douglas describing life at the Scottish court since the marriage of Anne of Denmark and James VI of Scotland and their return from Denmark on 1 May 1590. Dundas had been travelling in England, sightseeing in Cambridge and York, and wrote from Edinburgh on 11 June 1590. He thought the Scottish court was solitary, depleted by reformers who had reduced the number of paid attendants. Everything was arranged by the Lord Chancellor of Scotland, John Maitland of Thirlestane. He reported that the queen, Anna of Denmark, had not surrounded herself with ladies in waiting, but "carries a marvellous gravity, which with her partial solitariness, contrary to the humour of our people, has banished all our ladies clean from her". John Maitland urged Anna to receive an honorable company of ladies and gentlemen in her household in July 1590.

In May 1592, Dundas wrote a letter of recommendation for a young Swiss student, Johann Peter Hainzel von Degerstein, who wished to visit Andrew Melville at the University of St Andrews.

In May 1594 he went to London to the ambassador Edward Bruce. His kinsman John Colville shadowed the "young baron of Fingask" from Newcastle to Durham and reported his movements to the poet Henry Lok. Colville discovered the contents of letters carried by Dundas and sent his comments to Lok for Sir Robert Cecil. He returned on 30 May with Edward Bruce.

A letter of 20 July 1594 seems to refer to the emblems painted on Scottish ceilings which carry moral meanings. Dundas wrote to Sir Robert Cecil, mentioning that Henry Lok had told him in London that Cecil wanted "of suche toyis" for his new gallery in his London townhouse as he had seen painted in Edinburgh. Dundas enclosed some of these, presumably drawings of the "toys" or emblems. This letter was signed "William Dondas".

A letter from James Douglas of Spott in London to William Dundas of Fingask, from November 1594, praises his skill in the Latin language, and includes news of the injury of the Earl of Erroll at the Battle of Glenlivet.

William Dundas died in September 1599. His brother Archibald Dundas succeeded him as laird of Fingask.

There has been some confusion over the date of the death of William Dundas and the identity of the "baron of Fingask" in the letters of John Colville.
