= Falkland Palace =

Castle in Fife, Scotland

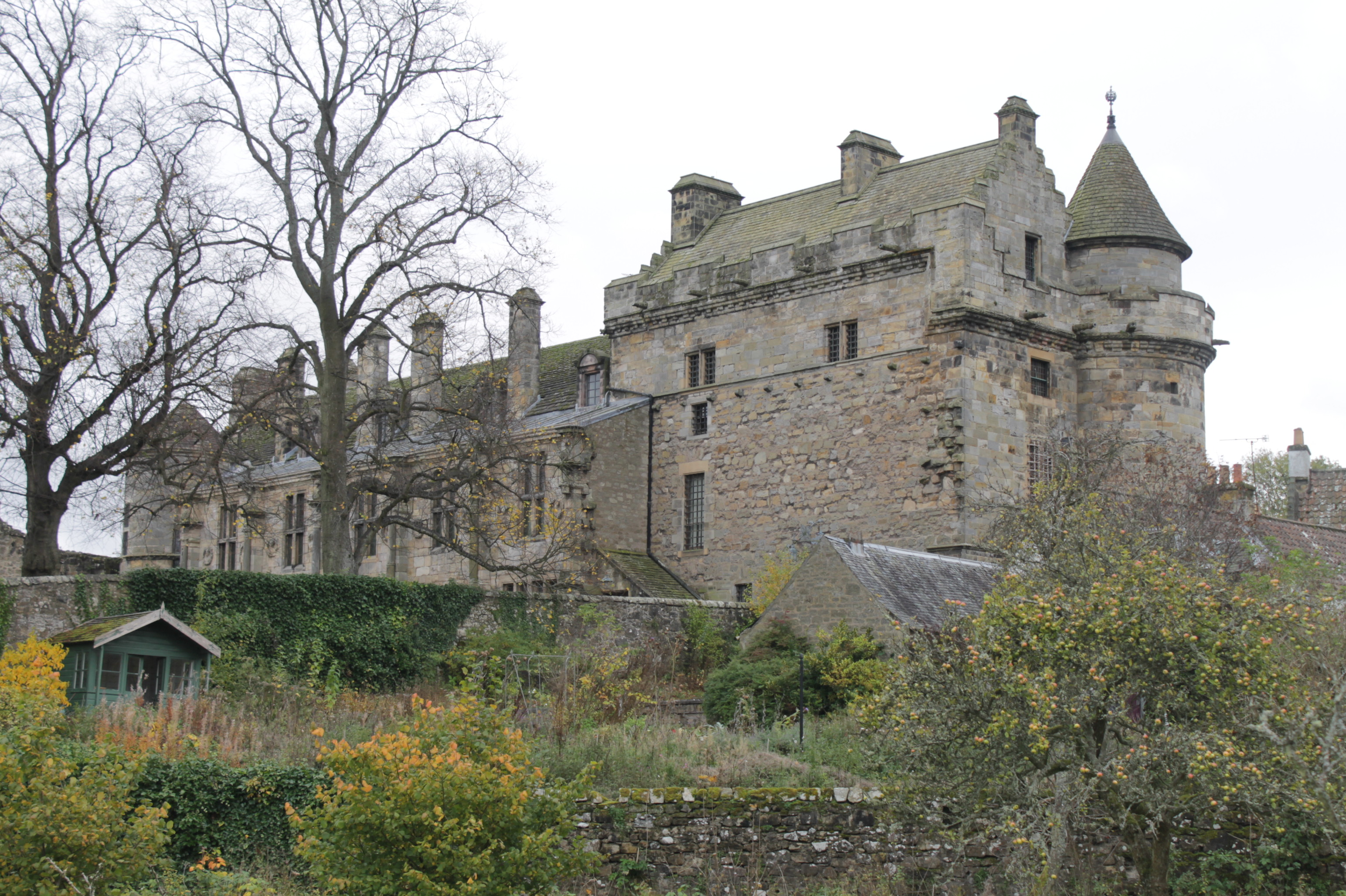
- Falkland Palace in 2020

General information
- Location: Falkland, Fife, Scotland
- Coordinates: 56.25434°N 3.20632°W

Scheduled monument
- Official name: Falkland Palace
- Designated: 30 April 1920
- Reference no.: SM854

Inventory of Gardens and Designed Landscapes in Scotland
- Official name: Falkland Palace
- Designated: 1 July 1987
- Reference no.: GDL00176

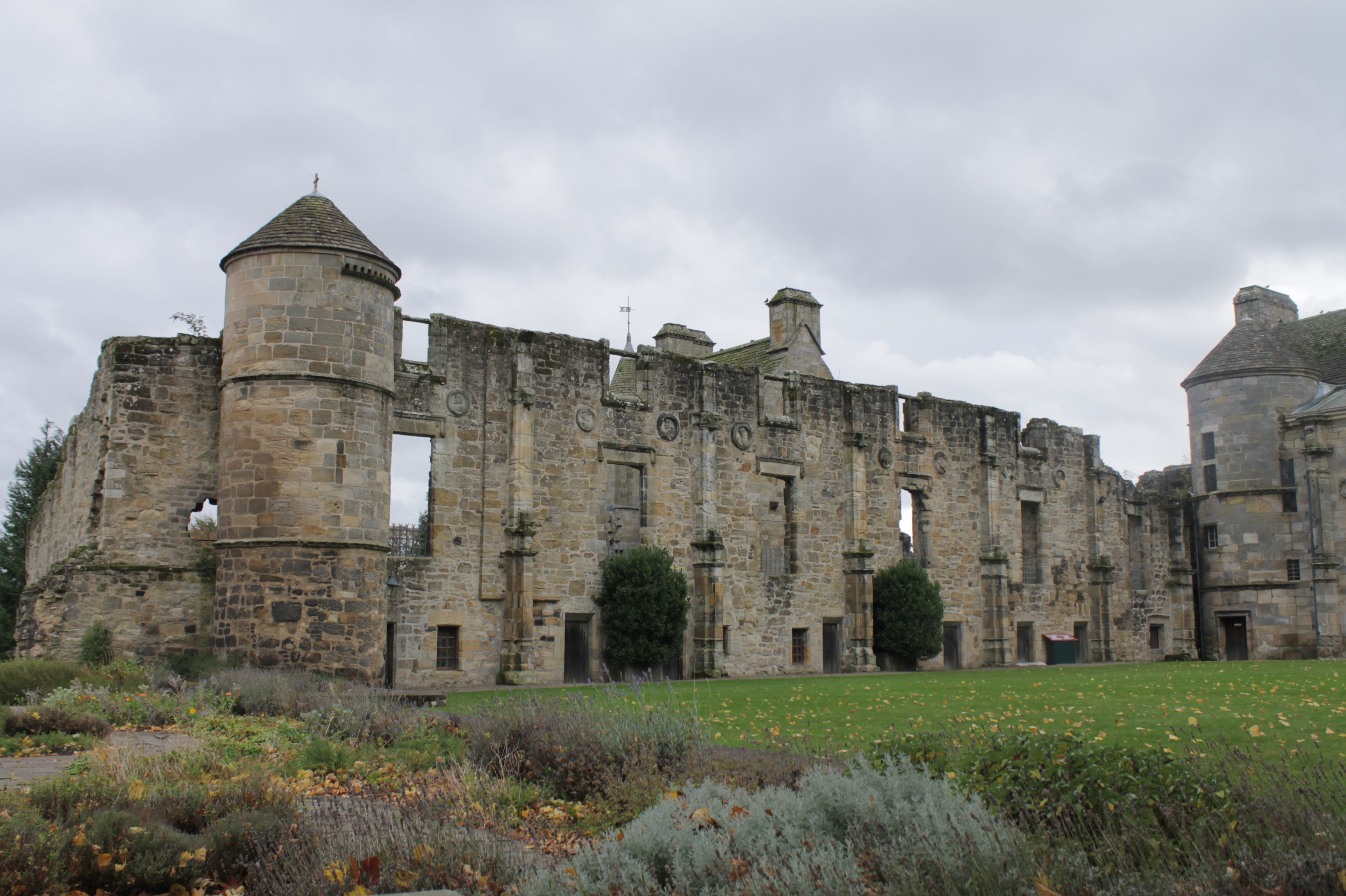
Falkland Palace, 'East Quarter' from the Courtyard

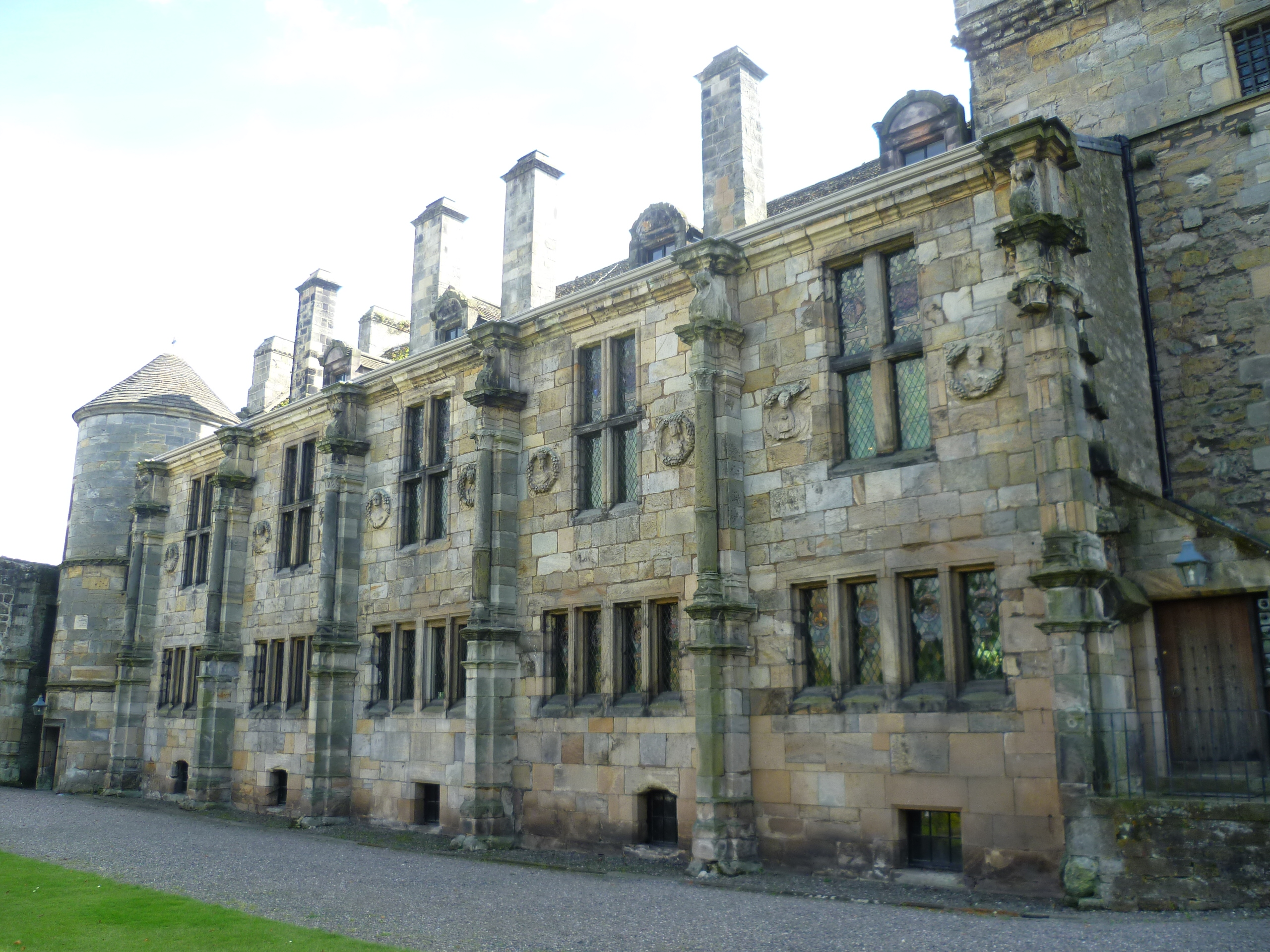
Falkland Palace, 'South Quarter' from the Courtyard

Falkland Palace, in Falkland, Fife, Scotland, is a royal palace of the Scottish kings. It was one of the favourite places of Mary, Queen of Scots, who took refuge there from political and religious turmoil of her times.

Today it is under the stewardship of Ninian Stuart, who delegates most of his duties to the National Trust for Scotland. The Chapel Royal in the Palace is dedicated to Thomas the Apostle. It is open to the public and reserved for Catholic worship.

== History ==
=== Early years ===
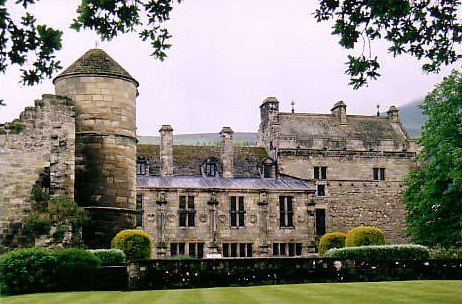
Falkland Palace from the gardens

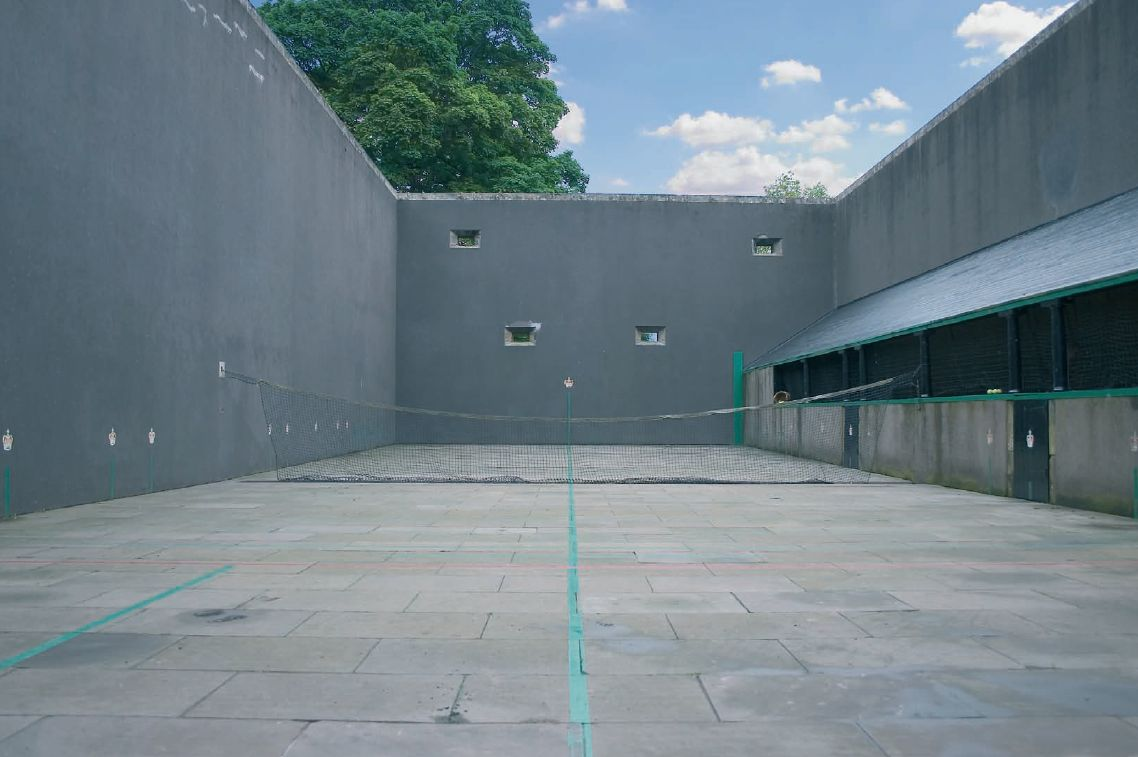
Real tennis court

In the late 12th century, a royal hunting lodge was located on this site. The lodge was expanded in the 13th century to operate as a castle, owned by the Earls of Fife of the noted Clan MacDuff. The castle was built here because the site is on a slight hill that could be defended. The surrounding land eventually were developed as the Palace gardens.

To the north, between the royal stable and the River Eden, was a great oak wood. Its many groves merged into the surrounding parkland. Timber was occasionally cut in the forest for royal ships of war.

The castle would have been surrounded by meadows, fields, orchards, glades and Falkland Park, which was a managed forest surrounded by a pale, a ditch with a fence on top of it. The pale would have been used to keep game inside the park reserved for hunting by the royal family and its courtiers. A park keeper maintained the Pale. In 1469 the keeper Bannatyne was docked wages for failing to keep it repaired.

In 1371 Isabella MacDuff, Countess of Fife acknowledged Robert Stewart, Earl of Menteith, son of Robert II, as her heir. She made him keeper of the castle and forest of Falkland. In 1402 Stewart, by then Duke of Albany, imprisoned his nephew and rival David Stewart, Duke of Rothesay, at Falkland; he was the eldest son of Robert III. The incarcerated Duke eventually died from neglect and starvation. According to a chronicle, the starving Duke of Rothesay had eaten his own hands.

Albany was exonerated from blame by the Parliament of Scotland, but suspicions of foul play persisted. These suspicions were carried against Rothesay's younger brother, the future King James I. These events eventually led to the downfall of the Albany Stewarts.

After ordering the execution of Albany's son Murdoch in 1424, James I took possession of Falkland for the crown. Falkland became a popular retreat with all the Stewart monarchs and queens consort. They practised falconry there and used the vast surrounding forests for hawking. Red deer and fallow deer were kept in the park for hunting, some brought from the Torwood Forest near Stirling.

=== Mary of Guelders ===
James II of Scotland granted Falkland to his queen consort Mary of Guelders, and the palace or castle became a favourite residence. The stables and other buildings in the close were repaired and a new kitchen was built for the visits of the royal couple in 1453. Linseed, cabbage seed, onion, leek, and other seeds were bought for the garden.

As a widow, Mary of Guelders employed her stewards Henry Kinghorn and William Blair to supervise improvements at Falkland Palace in 1461–2. The works included a stairway from the queen's chamber to the pleasance, new stables, a coal shed, repairs and an extension to the counting house, and a smith-made andirons or firedogs for the queen's bedchamber and the fire grate of the great hall. The royal carpenter was Andrew Lesouris. New structures included a "galry" with two chambers, apparently the earliest use of the French-derived term "gallery" in Britain.

Works in the grounds included the construction of two ponds in the hay yard. A new lawn was laid near the queen's chamber, and a doorway was made for her to access the garden. Such access was popular in this period; in other countries, Margaret of Anjou at Greenwich Palace and Isabella of Portugal at Bruges had access from their lodgings to the gardens. Eleanor of Naples built new lodgings and a terrace garden at Castello Estense in Ferrara.

At Linlithgow Palace, a door leads out to the garden and pele at the foot of what may have been the queen consort's tower under the oriel windows of the royal chambers. Mary of Guelders is said to have had a garden walk made between two oak trees, known as "Queen's Quarrels", a name suggestive of the practice of archery, a "quarrel" being a name for a crossbow bolt. Another walk was called the "Gilderland". The hay meadow of Falkland is regularly mentioned in the royal accounts, as are onions, because the palace gardener's pay was based on four barrels of onions.

James III and Margaret of Denmark came to Falkland in September 1473. The court of the Exchequer met at Falkland annually to complete the accounts of the jointure lands of James's mother, Mary of Guelders. She may have intended to make Falkland Palace her residence and spiritual retreat in widowhood.

=== James IV at Falkland ===
Between 1497 and 1541 James IV and James V transformed the old castle and royal lodgings into a beautiful renaissance-style royal palace. James enjoyed imported oranges at Falkland in April 1497 and gave a tip to the gardener and workmen building the dyke around the park. Accounts mention Perkin Warbeck, his servants and his horses, at Falkland in 1496. In May 1501, James IV hired two stonemasons from Dundee to work at the palace, and an hourglass was bought for time-keeping. On 13 December 1501 he was entertained at Falkland by the female minstrel Quhissilgibboun, and in September 1504 by fiddlers, lutenists, and an African drummer known as the "More taubronar". A man from Pittenweem brought a live seal to the castle on 25 September 1502 and James IV gave him 14 shillings in reward.

The queen consort, Margaret Tudor, came to Falkland in August 1509. A new chapel (perhaps on the site of the present south quarter) was roofed in 1512 by Alexander and John Slater, and masons worked on the garden wall. William Thome completed the walls of the great hall. James IV was entertained at Falkland by the "Wild Lady", who received £10 for her appearances in 1513.

James IV brought deer-nets from Kinneil House in November 1503. Andrew Matheson built a fold for deer in November 1505. A trap was made to "slay foxes in the park of Falkland". For a time in 1507 the horse of the French herald Montjoie, Gilbert Chauveau, was kept in the palace stables. In May 1508 James IV and John Methven stalked deer in the park with a firearm called a culverin. Later, wild boar, imported from France, were kept in the Park, within a fence made by the Laird of Fernie. Dairy and beef cattle were kept to support the castle population.

=== James V and Mary of Guise ===
The teenage James V was detained at Falkland Palace by the Earl of Angus and, according to Robert Lindsay of Pitscottie, escaped to Stirling Castle which was held by his mother Margaret Tudor. He had announced an early morning deer hunt in the park, but escaped by horse in the middle of the night dressed as a stable hand. Pitscottie cites a local landowner Andrew Fernie as one of his sources, and Fernie probably provided this story.

To address the poor state of the garden and park, James V appointed a new Captain and Keeper, William Barclay, Master of Rhynd, in March 1527. The Queen's Chamber was hung with tapestry for Margaret Tudor in September 1534. James V extended his father's buildings in French renaissance style from 1537. He arranged to build a Royal Tennis Court and bowling alley in the garden in 1541. The tennis court was called a caichpule in Scots and the game was known in French as jeu de paume. Mary was said to have scandalised the people of Scotland by wearing men's breeches to play the game.

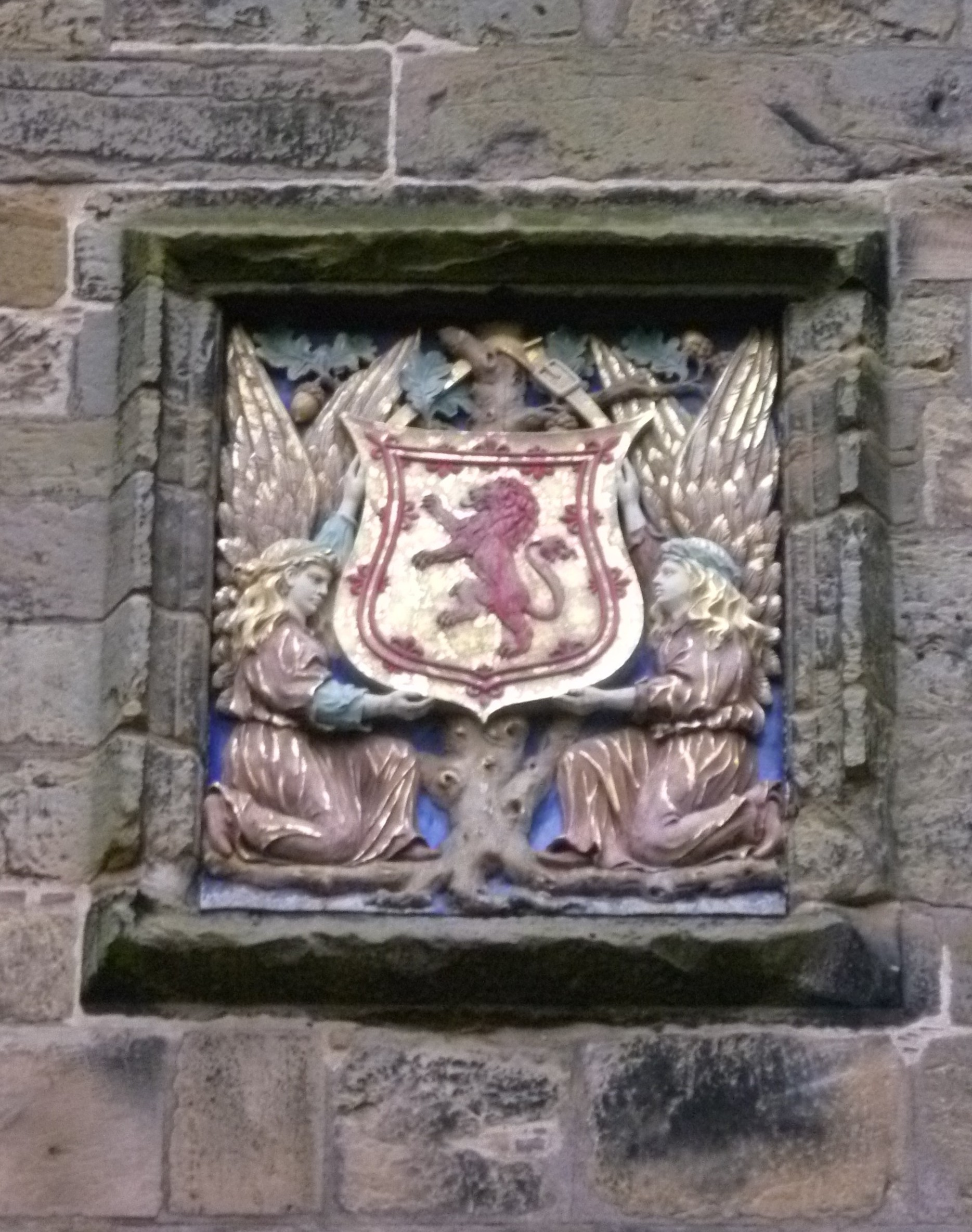
The arms of the King of Scots at the gatehouse

Amidst the building works and renovations, the Scotland court regularly went to Falkland, and in December 1538 and 1540 new velvet and satin gowns were packed in a canvas bag and sent to Falkland as gifts for the Queen's ladies in waiting. A new green satin gown and shirts were sent for Senat, the Queen's fool. In February 1539 one of Mary of Guise's French courtiers, Marie Pieris, married Lord Seton by handfasting. The French apothecary was also at Falkland on that day. James V held a tournament at Falkland on or around May Day 1539.

Mary of Guise spent time embroidering her husband's shirts at Falkland with gold thread in October 1539, and the luggage of her ladies in waiting included embroidery equipment, called "broder warklumys". James V played cards with Mary of Guise during their visit in April 1540. While they were at the palace, servants washed the clothes of his infant daughter by Elizabeth Beaton, the Lady Jean Stewart. Thomas Melville's wife kept the royal family's pets. In August Mary of Guise went riding at Falkland in a new cloak of scarlet cloth edged with crimson velvet. Her tailor Nicholas du Moncel and her embroiderer Henri Le Moyne witnessed the wedding at Falkland of another French servant Jean Landais.

The goldsmith John Mosman made a gilt chalice for the couple's short-lived son Prince James, born 1540. In July 1541 they sent the chalice to Falkland to be used in the palace chapel. In the same month wild boar from France arrived. The Laird of Fernie built a new park dyke and a timber-fenced run for the boar. The wild boar came from Elbeuf near Rouen, and Mary of Guise's younger brother René II de Lorraine, Marquis d'Elbeuf later became an enthusiast for the boar hunt with dogs and toiles, known as le vautrait. An inventory of the goods of James V includes "five sangler staves" for boar hunting. James V kept a kind of menagerie at Falkland, employing Thomas Melville's wife to look after the pets.

An inventory recorded a green velvet bed in the wardrobe at Falkland Palace with velvet covered posts, packed in coffers and travel bags called "sowmes". Robert Murray, the plumber who maintained the fountain at Linlithgow Palace, provided lead work for a long vanished fountain at Falkland.

James V died at Falkland Palace in December 1542, from an illness induced by the shock and grief of his army's defeat at Solway Moss. Some say he also grieved his wife's failure to give him a male heir, when she instead gave birth to the future Mary, Queen of Scots. His body lay in the Chapel Royal for almost a month and the chapel was draped in black. On 4 January 1543 messengers ordered the gentlemen of Fife to convey the king's body to North Queensferry on its way to Holyrood Abbey.

=== Reign of Mary, Queen of Scots ===
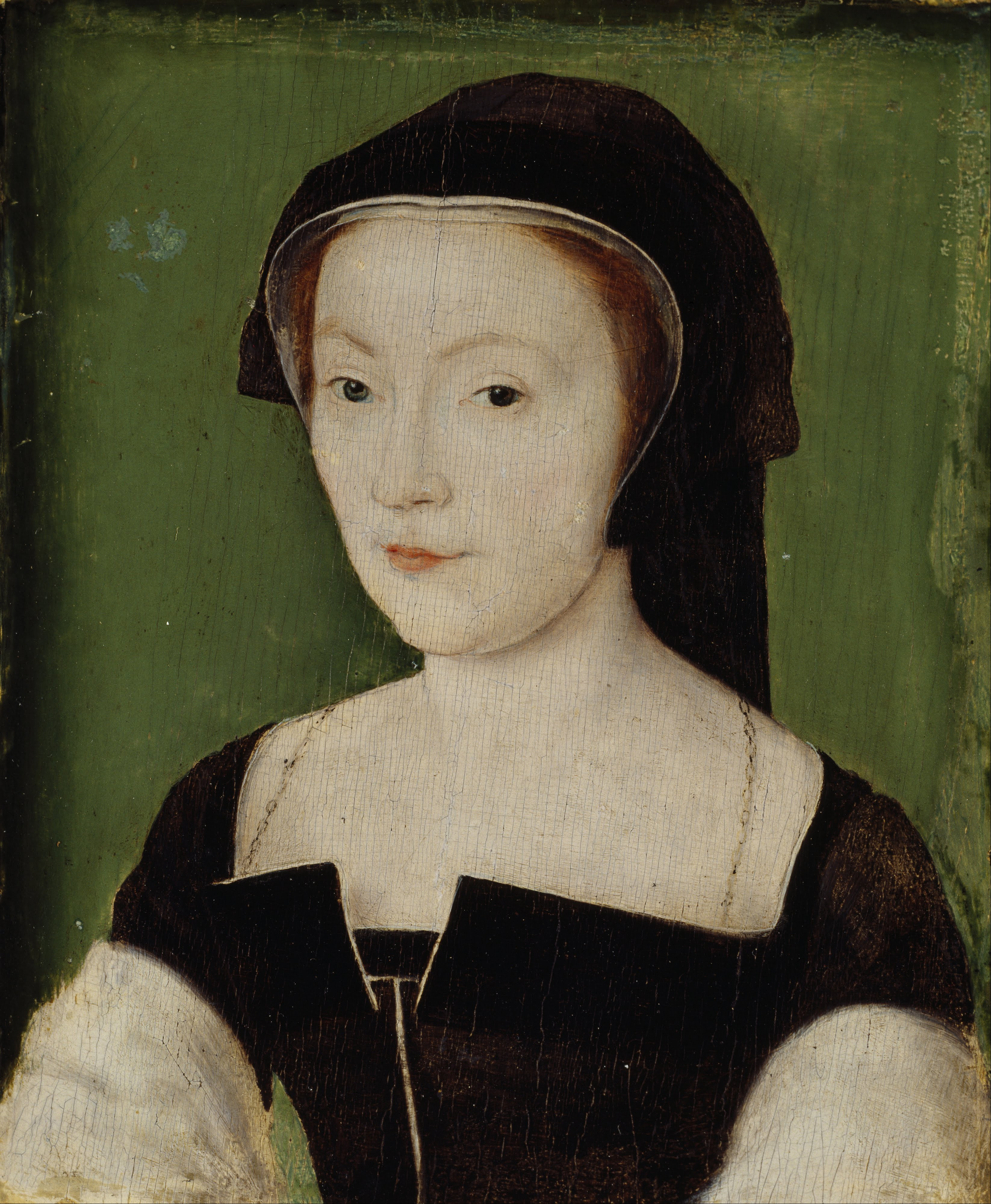
Mary of Guise, mother of Mary, Queen of Scots, frequently stayed at Falkland.

Mary, Queen of Scots was born at Linlithgow Palace and moved to Stirling Castle in July 1543. Her mother, Mary of Guise, sometimes travelled without her to stay at Falkland Palace. Falkland and Stirling palaces were official residences of Mary of Guise as a widow, and she continued to keep wild boars for hunting in Falkland park.

Mary of Guise frequently stayed at Falkland, especially in autumn, and was recorded there in October 1546, and in September 1549. Regent Arran also came to Falkland in October 1546. A letter, perhaps of 1548, mentions the refurbishment of the stables, the wardrobes, and the lodgings of one of Guise's officials.

Mary of Guise asked the Earl of Bothwell to escort her from Falkland to Stirling Castle for a convention or council in December 1549. In October 1552, Regent Arran (who ruled Scotland on behalf of Mary) wondered if Mary of Guise would come from Falkland for a Privy Council meeting because the palace and town were too small for the number of expected attendees. He wrote, "they will be a great company of folks and can not be easily lodged in Falkland". Regent Arran's daughter, Anne Hamilton, joined Mary of Guise at Falkland in June 1553.

Nearby Myres Castle was the home of the Royal Macers and Sergeants at Arms who served Falkland Castle since at least the 16th century. John Scrimgeour of Myres supervised building at the Palace from 1532 to 1563. He wrote to Mary of Guise about repairs to Falkland and its lead roofs, delayed by the frosts, and the carts he needed to bring stones to the palace and timber from the harbour at Levenmouth. In May 1559 Scrimgeour repaired the stables and hired Adam Symmers to fix the palace windows. He also designed new ditches and fences for the garden.

Mary, Queen of Scots, returned from France in September 1561, and hosted a group of diplomats at Falkland. Her visits to Falkland have been tracked in archival sources. Mary held her Maundy Thursday or "Skyris Thurisday" ceremony at Falkland in March 1562, washing the feet of 19 young women. John Balfour bought new linen cloth for the aprons and towels which she gave to the maidens. The number of young women matched her age. Mary came for Easter at Falkland in April 1563 and 1564.

Mary fell off her horse near Falkland in May 1562 and had to defer a plan to travel to England and meet Elizabeth I. At Easter 1562, James Hamilton, 3rd Earl of Arran came to Falkland bringing news of a conspiracy. He claimed that James Hepburn, 4th Earl of Bothwell planned to abduct Mary and the Earl of Moray from the deer park. Both Earls were imprisoned, and Arran was considered to be mentally ill.

=== James VI and Anne of Denmark ===
James VI of Scotland was considered an adult ruler after October 1579. In preparation for his visits to Falkland, a cooper in Leith, William Todd, supplied barrels and brewing equipment for the palace. In April 1582, James VI of Scotland made John Killoch and Robert Schaw keepers of all his tennis courts, and suppliers of his balls and rackets. In June 1583, Schaw spent £100 on refurbishing the court at Falkland.

James VI spent the summer of 1583 at Falkland, and the English diplomat Robert Bowes noted it was a "little house" unsuitable for holding a parliament. In 1584 James VI had the roofs repaired, and requested Agnes Leslie, Lady of Lochleven, and his tenants in Fife to send horses and help carry slates, tiles, timber, sand and lime to the palace. In July and August 1584, James welcomed Albert Fontenay, a French envoy sent by his mother, at Falkland, and lent him a horse to join in the hunting.

James VI stayed in the palace during the plague in July 1585. For fear of infection, he ordered people with no business in Falkland or at court to stay away. His guests in Fife in the summer of 1585 included the English ambassador Edward Wotton and three Danish envoys who came to discuss the Orkney and Shetland islands and the king's marriage. Wotton had a private discussion with James in the gallery at Falkland about a peace treaty with England and an offer of a regular pension payment or subsidy of 20,000.

In August 1586, James VI was at Falkland with the French diplomat Charles de Prunelé, Baron d'Esneval. In September he received a gift of books and hunting horses from Elizabeth I, and news of the discovery of the Babington Plot. The Master of Gray wrote from Falkland to the Scottish ambassador in London that James was "content for the law to go forward", if her life was safe.

James VI held a meeting at Falkland in September 1587 to discuss his marriage plans after hearing from his ambassadors that the elder Danish Princess Elizabeth was promised to another. In August 1589, he entertained the French diplomat Jean Hotman, Marquis de Villers-St-Paul at Falkland, and gave him a jewel and a ring with a diamond set in a star. Hotman promoted the interests of the Earl of Essex to James VI and may have advocated that James marry Catherine of Bourbon instead of a Danish princess.

James VI married the younger Princess Anne of Denmark; he included Falkland in the "morning gift" that he gave to his bride. On 12 May 1590 the Danish ambassadors rode from Wemyss Castle to Falkland to evaluate the palace and her Fife lands. They were welcomed by the keeper James Beaton of Creich. The lawyer John Skene produced a charter of the queen's lands and, as a traditional symbol of ownership, the Danish Admiral Peder Munk was given a handful of earth and stone. After this ceremony, they rode to the Newhouse of Lochleven Castle.

The following year, another Danish ambassador Paul Knibbe came to Falkland in July 1591. He brought a Danish gentlewoman, probably Margaret Vinstarr, to join the Queen's household. Around this time an African servant of Anne of Denmark, known only as "the Moir" [Moor], died and was buried at Falkland, probably at the kirkyard of Kilgour. He was identified as a "page of the equerry" who wore clothes of orange velvet and Spanish taffeta.

=== Raid of Falkland ===
For five hours in the morning of 28 June 1592 Francis Stewart, Earl of Bothwell, with the Master of Gray, James Lumsden of Airdrie, the Laird of Niddrie, John Colville, and Spott with others including men from Cumbria attempted to capture the palace and James VI and Anne of Denmark. James VI had been warned of Bothwell's approach and had stayed at Falkland rather than go to Perth as he had planned. Bothwell's plans had been revealed to the English ambassador in Edinburgh, Robert Bowes, and he had told Richard Cockburn, the Earl of Morton, and the Master of Glamis that the king should "look narrowly about him". Bothwell crossed the Forth at Queensferry on 27 June with 400 men. The Earl of Erroll and Colonel William Houston were at Falkland and they were arrested on suspicion of being inside-men.

Bothwell's men attempted to batter down the back gate but were repulsed by gunshots before midnight on 27 June. The king withdrew to the gatehouse tower and his guard shot at Bothwell's men. According to James Melville the defenders who favoured Bothwell loaded their guns with paper rather than bullets. Bothwell abandoned the attack at 7 o'clock in the morning, and rode away with the king's horses. James Sandilands gave chase. He captured nine men whose horses tired, five were hanged in Edinburgh's Canongate, the others were ransomed. One of John Colville's servants was hanged, a packet of coded letters and a cipher was found in his possession.

The English border reiver Richie Graham of Brackenhill and his companions sacked the town of Falkland, taking horses, clothing, and money. It was said that Bothwell had given a pep talk to his supporters, encouraging them to kill Sir John Carmichael, Sir George Home, and Roger Aston.

A month later it was said that Bothwell was advancing towards Falkland again from Stirling Bridge, and some of his men had landed in boats at a creek near Aberdour Castle. The king was forewarned by Harry Lindsay and prepared for another fight. The Earl of Argyll rode from his wedding party at Dalkeith Palace to help the king. Men in arms were summoned from Edinburgh, Haddington and Linlithgow to fight the rebel earl. However, Robert Bowes was told it was a deliberate false alarm, possibly intended to make the king move from Falkland to a less secure location. Bothwell also attempted to corner the King in Holyroodhouse.

=== Palace staff in the 1590s ===
The royal couple returned to Falkland in 1593, enjoying five tuns of wine which were shipped to nearby Levenmouth. At this time, James Beaton of Creich was keeper of the palace. Robert Arnot of Kilquhus, Chamberlain of Fife, looked after the park and the meadow, and took receipt of local produce including the onions from the palace garden. Andrew Fairny maintained the dykes and ditches. The tenants of the village of Casch were compensated for damage done by escaped deer. James VI's master stabler David Murray kept the king's mares and stags in the park. Guilliam looked after the hay, and George Strathauchin was the palace gardener.

=== Deer from England ===
Queen Elizabeth I sent deer for the park in 1586 and 1587, and again in 1591 from parks near Colchester. These were diplomatic gifts. In May 1586, James VI went to Falkland the deer taken out of carts and set loose in the park. James asked the English ambassador Thomas Randolph for some of Elizabeth's huntsmen, Yeoman prickers and Grooms of the leash, and some horses. A Yeoman pricker was employed to manage and guide the hunted deer.

English huntsmen and bucks were sent to James VI in August 1586 by Randolph and the Scottish ambassador in London, Archibald Douglas. Randolph wrote:

I have sent the Kynge two hunting men, verie good and skillful, with one footman, that can hoop, hollow and crye, that all the trees in Fawkland will quake for fear. Pray the Kynge's Majestie to be mercifull to the poor bucks; but let him spare and look well to himself.

In November 1586, Archibald Douglas wrote to Francis Walsingham that a gift of bucks from Elizabeth might help James with his grief at the forthcoming loss of his mother. In February 1587, according to the French diplomat Courcelles, James said that if Elizabeth meddled with his mother's life he would return more than the "dogges and deare" she sent him as gifts.

In July 1587, the poet and diplomat Guillaume de Salluste Du Bartas spent his time at Falkland with King James hunting deer and hare, "a la chasse des daims et des lievres". James VI paid £54 Scots to Archibald Arnot, a burgess in Falkland, for looking after his huntsmen in 1588.

In May 1592 the English ambassador Robert Bowes went to Barnard Castle, Raby Castle and Brancepeth Castle with the English-born royal huntsman Cuthbert Rayne to catch deer for James VI and managed to catch only six, which he shipped from Sunderland to Kirkcaldy. In April 1597, the carpenter and "master wright" James Murray was in charge of transporting 28 English deer from Leith to Falkland. Robin the Hunter kept hounds for James at Falkland. Anne of Denmark sent deer hounds as gifts to her brother, Christian IV of Denmark.

=== A royal quarrel ===
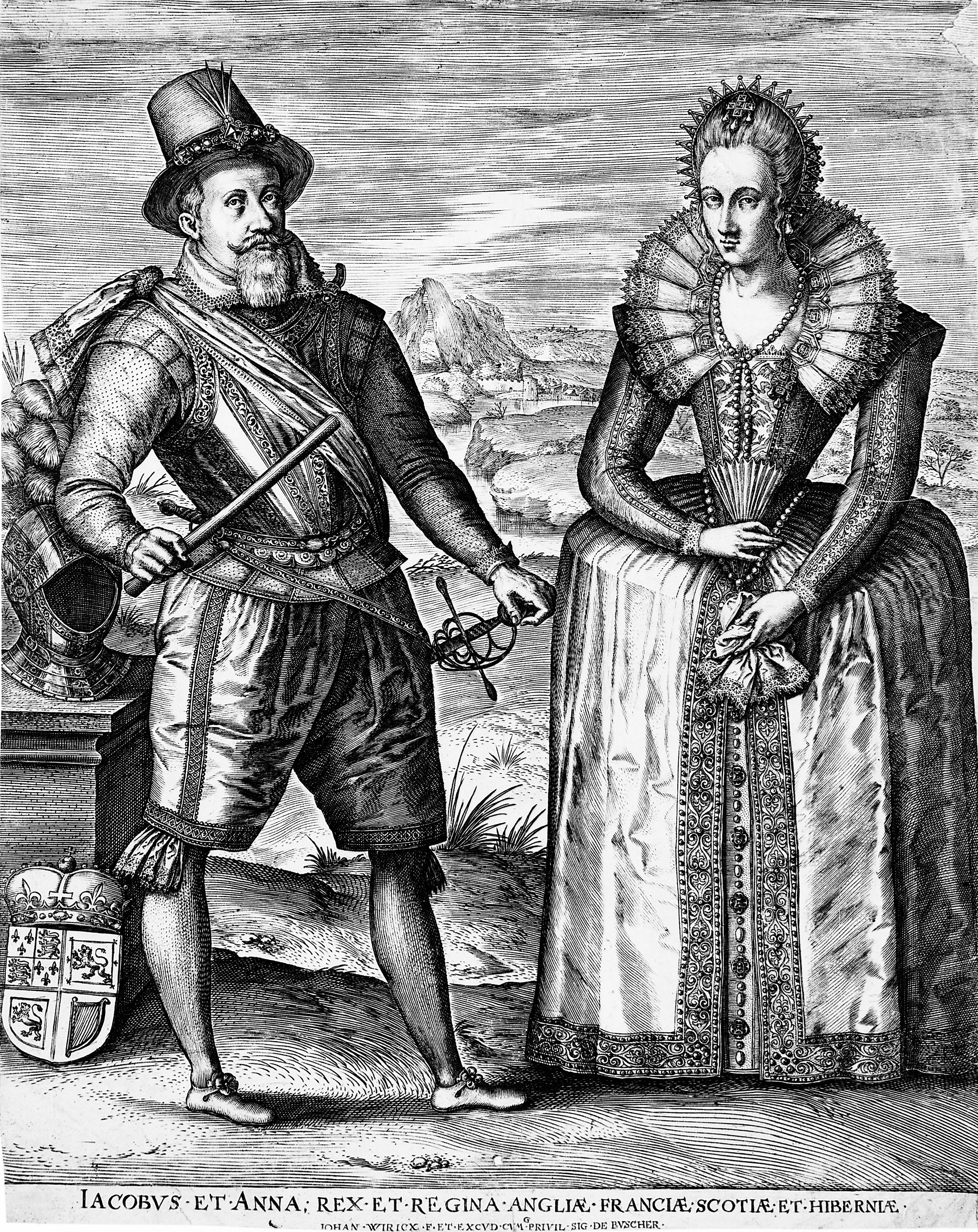
James VI and Anne of Denmark spent time at Falkland during their quarrel about Prince Henry

Another Danish commission including Steen Bille and Niels Krag visited in 1593, which resulted in the keeper James Beaton of Creich giving more rights over the lands and buildings to the queen, Anne of Denmark. She came to stay on 12 July 1594 before the baptism of Prince Henry at Stirling Castle. It was said she left Edinburgh for Falkland because Holyrood Palace was not magnificent enough to receive the Danish ambassadors Steen Bille and Christian Barnekow.

James VI arranged for Prince Henry to stay at Stirling Castle with the Earl of Mar. This did not suit the queen. Courtiers took sides as the quarrel deepened. In August 1595 James persuaded Anne, who was now reluctant to leave Edinburgh, to come to Falkland and meet the Earl of Mar for a reconciliation. The kirk minister and royal chaplain Patrick Galloway gave a sermon about Adam and Eve and the duties of man and wife to each other, and it was thought that "she gave good ear to his advice". Another church minister David Lindsay, had a "long conference" with Anne at Falkland, hoping to heal the quarrel. It was said that James were Anne were now "being so lovingly together at Falkland".

Anne was joined at Falkland by her friend and servant Margaret Vinstarr. She had returned from visiting the queen's mother, Sophie of Mecklenburg-Güstrow, whose message to her daughter was that she ought to obey her husband's will in all things.

=== The witch-hunt of 1597 ===
On 12 August 1597, James VI and his Privy Council gathered at Falkland Palace during the Great Scottish Witch Hunt of 1597 to issue a general proclamation revoking some of the commissions of justiciary against suspected witches. The proclamation came after the contentious commissions based on the evidence of accused witch, Margaret Aitken, who claimed she could detect other witches just by looking at their eyes. With this proclamation, the Order of Council restored duties to James VI which had been delegated as general commissions in 1591, giving local landowners the power to execute accused witches without dispute from central government.

By restoring these powers to the King, the Privy Council hoped to reduce the number of 'innocent' people killed. However, the order was quite limited in reality, only discrediting commissions presided over by one or two men alone, and it also reiterated James VI's determination to continue with the witch-hunt. However, during the trials of the early seventeenth century, the proclamation at Falkland Palace did help to introduce a new regime of restricted witch-hunting, and it demonstrated greater considerations surrounding the evidence needed to condemn a witch.

=== Last years as a royal palace ===
When Anne of Denmark visited in September 1598 her bed chamber was hung with tapestry brought from Holyroodhouse. Rhenish, "Rence", wine was brought to Falkland for her. A French ambassador Philippe de Béthune, brother of the Duke of Sully, came in July 1599. The English diplomat Sir William Bowes was reluctant to come to Falkland, where James VI might show more favour to the French ambassador. Béthune fell ill, needing a surgeon and a physician to bleed him. It was rumoured he had been poisoned. He recovered and went on a progress with the king to Inchmurrin and Hamilton Palace, after James VI wrote to the Laird of Wemyss for the loan of his best hackney horse and saddle.

In July 1600 herons nested in the park, and James VI hoping to have them "increase and multiply" forbade anyone to kill herons in neighbouring lands. In August a French acrobat danced on a tightrope in the palace courtyard for the king and the queen. According to James Melville, the display was intended to mitigate the Queen's feelings following the Gowrie House affair in August.

James VI played cards with the English diplomat George Nicholson at Falkland in May 1602. For a time, according to Nicholson, Prince Henry, who was usually kept at Stirling Castle, was allowed to visit and comfort his mother Anne of Denmark at Falkland after the death of Duke Robert.

In September 1602 Anne of Denmark and the Master of Gray entertained Anne de Gondi, the wife of French ambassador the Baron de Tour, at Falkland, while he went on a progress with the king. Lord Henry Howard noted that the Master of Gray had spent this time with Queen Anne and it affected the conceit of his writing style.

David Murray became keeper of the garden, park, and Lomond Hills and was allowed to build a house on the site of the old castle, called the Castlestead or Nether Palace of Falkland. Lord Walden stayed for a night in August 1613. This house was inherited by the next keeper of the park, John Murray, 1st Earl of Annandale. The palace was occasionally used as a prison. In November 1608 James instructed David Murray to keep James Elphinstone, 1st Lord Balmerino, prisoner in the tower of the palace, for treasonable correspondence with the Pope. Balmerino was released in October 1609. After hearing Anne of Denmark speak of her love of Scotland, the Venetian ambassador Antonio Foscarini came to Falkland in September 1613.

=== Union of the Crowns ===
After the Union of the Crowns in 1603, Andrew Murray of Balvaird kept a watchful eye on the palace and in 1615 he advised John Murray of the bedchamber that the king should send a commission for repairs, because otherwise "it will not fail to fall all to the ground. The back galleries are already decayed". The architect James Murray repaired the palace for the visit of King James in 1617. Some courtiers were lodged in the house of Nicol Moncrieff, which still stands in Falkland, opposite the palace gate. At the celebrations to welcome the king on 19 May, David Wedderburn provided a Latin poem, in which the King, after a day of hunting, was asked to contemplate the memorials of Scotland's past, victories over the Romans and Vikings, the wars of Scottish Independence, and the present union of the kingdoms of Britain.

The palace was repaired in 1629. Roofing slates were shipped from Dundee to Newburgh. A glazier, David Masterton, painted the iron window grills or yetts with red lead. A new set of wooden armorial panels were made for the gatehouse and painted by Valentine Jenkin.

=== Civil war ===
Charles I, and Charles II also visited Falkland. Accounts survive for Charles II's stay in July 1650, when proclamations had to be made to reduce the inflated prices of lodgings and horse-hire charged in the village. Charles' food was seasoned with saffron, nutmeg, cinnamon, cloves, and ginger. Every tart provided for the king's table had a pound of sugar, while tarts for lesser courtiers required only half a pound. The mining entrepreneur James Hope of Hopetoun visited on 18 July and met the king's physician Dr Fraser, and various officials. In the privy chamber, Charles thanked him for a previous gift of a piece of Scottish gold, and later they talked about mining and technology.

A fire partially destroyed the palace during its subsequent occupation by Oliver Cromwell's troops, and it quickly fell into ruin.

=== 19th century ===
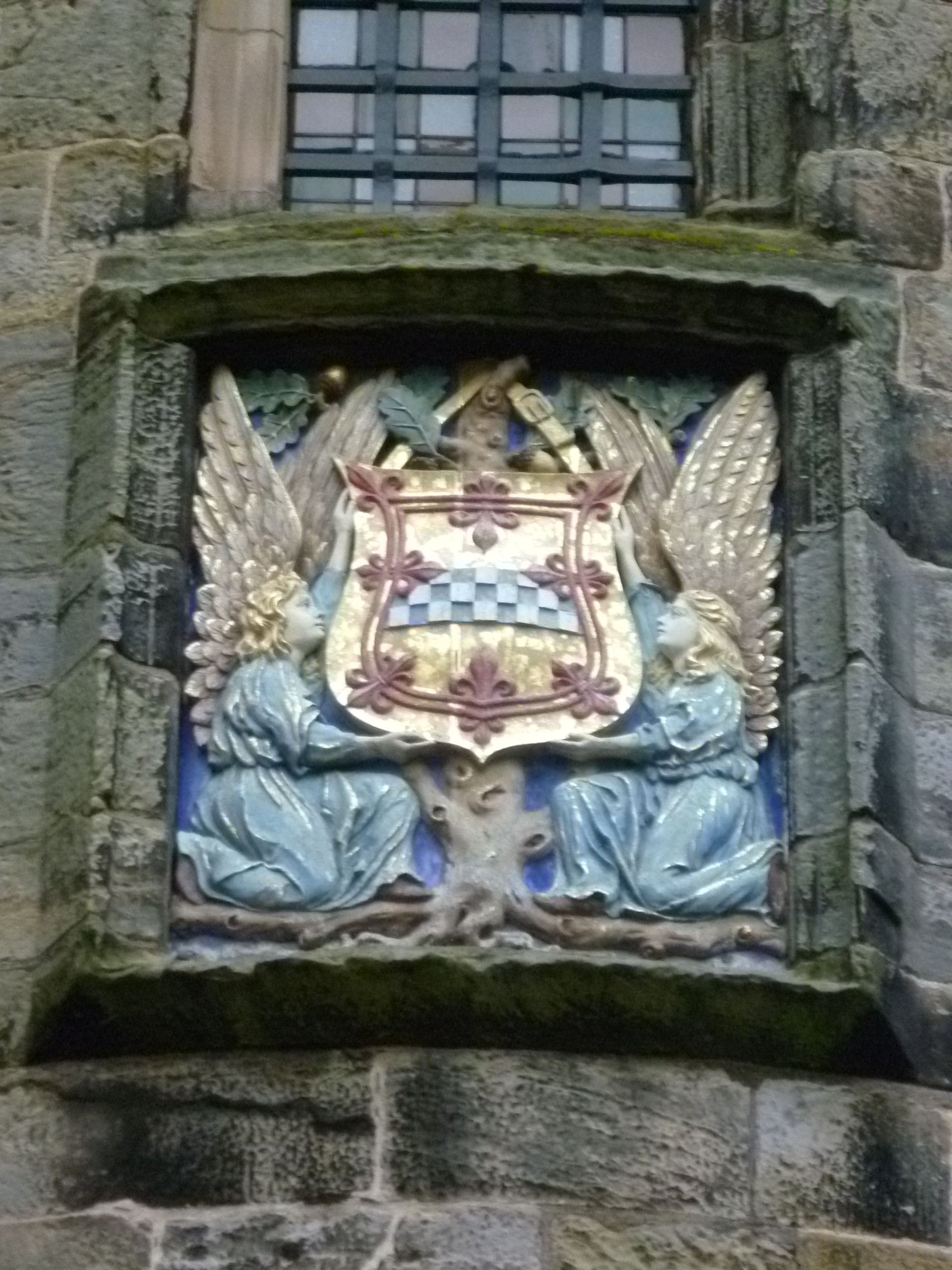
Arms of the Marquess of Bute

In 1887 John, 3rd Marquis of Bute, purchased the estates of Falkland and started a 20-year restoration of the palace using two architects: John Kinross and Robert Weir Schultz. At the time the Palace was a ruin with no windows or doors. Thanks to his restoration work and considerable budget the Palace remains standing today. Many features in and around the Palace show evidence of his work, such as the "B" on the guttering and portraits of his children carved into a cupboard door in the Keeper's Dressing Room.

During the time of Lord Bute, the ornamental kitchen garden was enhanced by a pergola and decorative vases. The north part of the "upper garden" was redesigned to express the foundations of Falkland Castle and Palace North Range which were uncovered during the Marquis's archaeological excavations. Walls were built atop the foundations for the Well Tower and the Great Hall to emphasise the structures.

The Orchard and Palace gardens were linked to the House of Falkland by the private walk and new bridges. Houses were built near the palace and connected into the ornamental kitchen garden and orchard by a system of new public and private paths. The ground around the curling pond (to the North East of the orchard) was planted with trees and shrubs and laid out in flower plots.

The enclosing yew hedge around the pond garden is a typical feature of period. The lime tree avenue which is north of the palace gatehouse was built sometime between 1894 and 1912–13 according to the Ordnance Surveys of those periods. The Victorian glass house was built in 1890 by Mckenzie and Moncur from Edinburgh for Lord Bute and was used mainly to grow flowers and exotic plants. Plant hunting was popular at that time and wealthy people would travel the world to find specimens, and plant in their gardens for display to friends. There is also evidence that there was a second glass house in the garden near the existing one.

=== Modern era ===
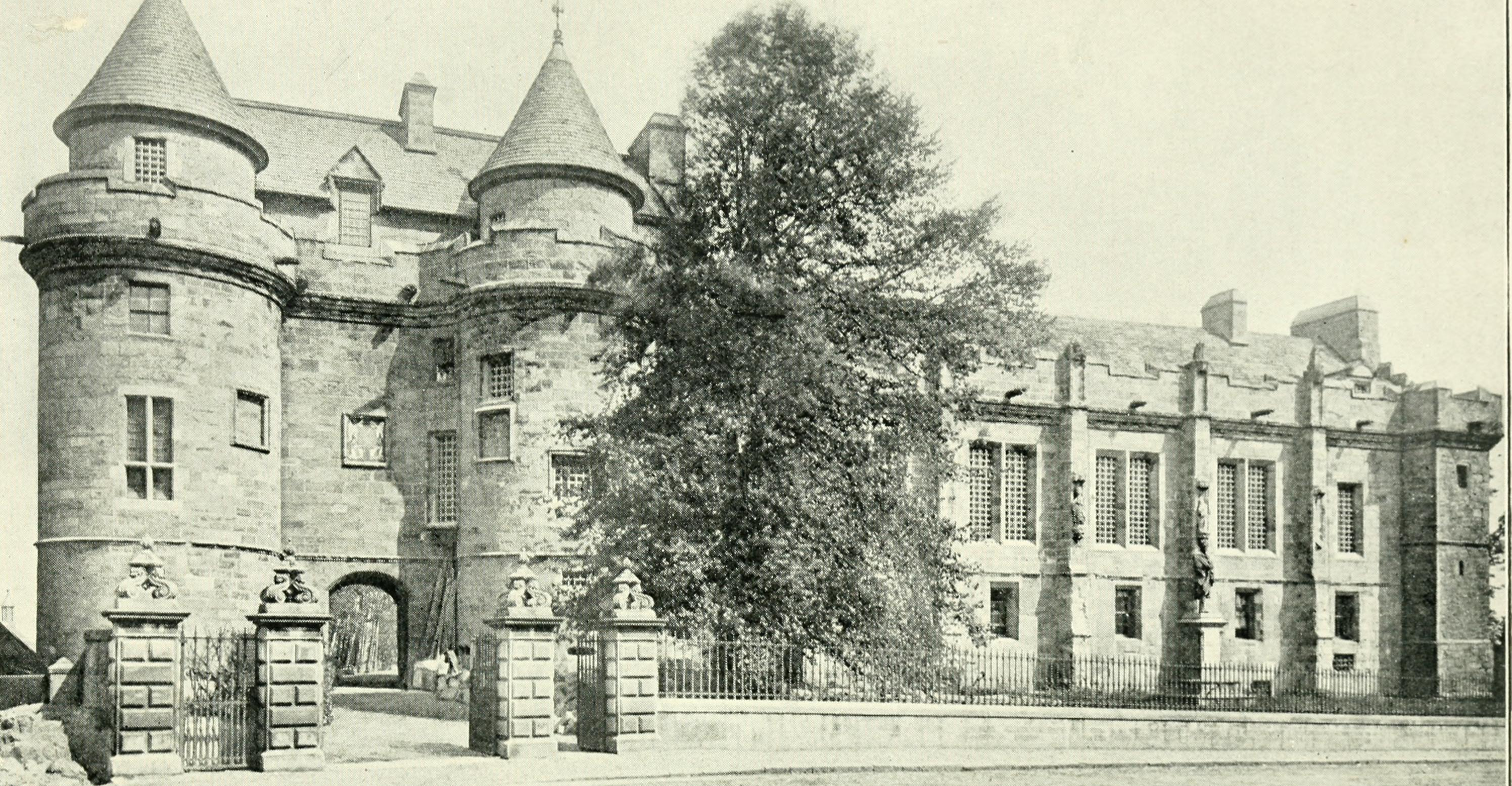
A 1902 view of the palace

In 1952, the Hereditary Keeper Major Michael Crichton Stewart decided to appoint the National Trust for Scotland to take care of the Palace. The National Trust thus became Deputy Keeper of the Palace, and they now care for and maintain the Palace and its extensive gardens. The NTS website offers an array of articles and images exploring the Palace and grounds.

National Galleries Scotland have created a digital project exploring how the palace would look if reimagined in a warmer setting due to climate change.

=== Gardens ===
Falkland Palace stands on three hectares of ground on a sandstone ridge which is dominated by the Lomond Hills in the background.

The first record of a garden here was in 1451. In 1500, a new gardener, John Strathachin or Strachen, was to be paid 4 merks yearly with grazing for his horse and cows. He was to provide fruit, onions and herbs. At that time the garden had a courtyard and stables in the gatehouse, where King James IV kept his great Belgian steed. There was also a fish pond which provided the King with fresh fish. Fruit, vegetables and herbs were grown in the area for the royal plate and meat could be hunted in the ancient forest (known as Falkland Forest) surrounding the Palace, by hawking and hunting wild boar and deer.

James VI met the English ambassadors Sir Robert Bowes and Sir William Bowes in the garden at 8 o'clock on 21 June 1597 and listened to their speeches about border affairs. In August 1602 James VI received the French ambassador, the Baron de Tour, in the garden. They talked for three quarters of an hour and the ambassador made the king laugh. A few days later they hunted together in the park.

Garden designer Percy Cane redesigned the gardens in the 1940s. He had designed the palace grounds at Addis Ababa in Ethiopia. Cane was born and educated in Essex where he studied horticulture and architecture. In 1930 Cane founded and edited the quarterly journal Garden Design and wrote many books on garden design. Cane's style can best be described as Arts and Crafts and his curvy borders were seen as innovatory at the time.

Conservation in the garden is achieved through general maintenance, which includes clearing leaves, mowing the main lawn, tidying the flower beds and planting, enhancing and creating wildlife habitats. A wildflower meadow, native hedges and spring flowering bulbs have been planted to provide food and protection to various small insects and small mammals. Conservation means work has to be carried out in a sympathetic way throughout property, not only to the aesthetics and history of the palace but also for the climbing plants and bats that live in the cellars. Bats are endangered and protected in Scotland and it is important that they are not disturbed. The walls of the palace have been repointed (replacing the cement between the stones) and replaced with lime mortar which is a traditional material and better suited for this purpose as it is breathable and prevents dampening.

The current Head Gardener Sonia Ferrás Mañá is restoring the Percy Cane garden to the original design and flower choice. Mañá, the garden staff and volunteers have been working on various project in recent years to conserve the garden and encourage wildlife.

The garden team at Falkland Palace are now encouraging wildlife by bringing back the meadow. To create the meadow the grass has been cut only once a year for the last four years and more than 10,000 wild flowers and a similar number of spring flowering bulbs have been planted. This work is thanks to the garden staff, volunteers and support from Fife Environmental Trust, Scottish Natural Heritage, NTS Member Centres and other donations. These flowers and un-mown grasses encourage beneficial insects to the orchard which aid in the fruit trees pollination and in turn attract other animals. There are currently forty different fly species in the orchard, some of which are rare or unusual and some are found nowhere else in Scotland. The insects, especially the moths, have attracted Pipistrelle and Soprano Pipistrelle bats which have been seen hunting and living here. There have also been sightings of red squirrels in the forest which are now considered endangered animals due to the disappearance of their habitat and the competition from grey squirrels. A Red Squirrel Project is carried out at Falkland Palace to encourage them back into the gardens. A shelter was built in the orchard for invertebrate (i.e. insects and worms) and small animals which will encourage them to stay longer in the garden and perhaps live there. The orchard has been planted with native trees such as hawthorn, oak and willows which would have been growing here in the 15th century. The Maspie Burn running between the garden and the orchard is a habitat for water wildlife, including trout.

== Building materials ==
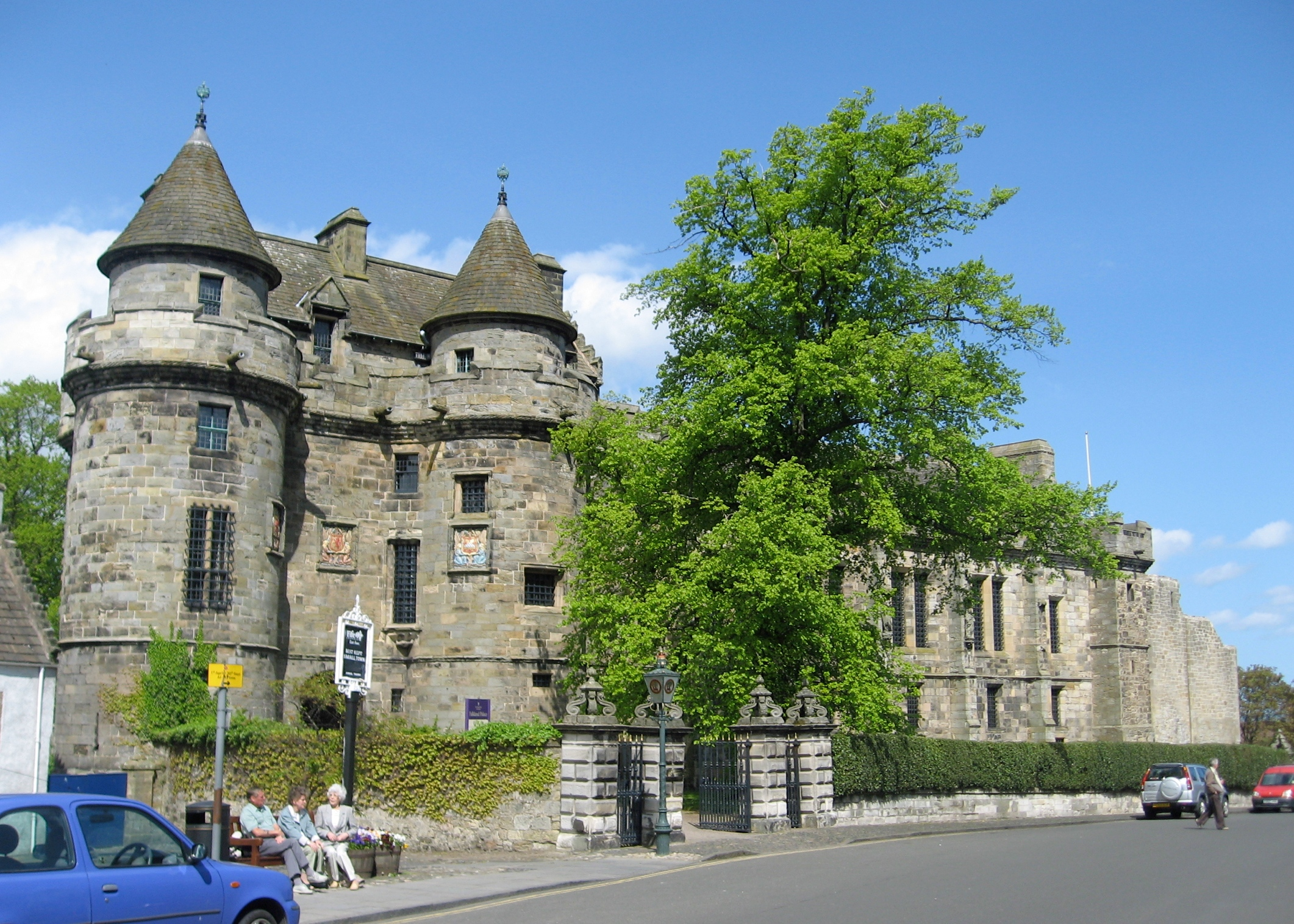
Falkland Palace, entrance façade

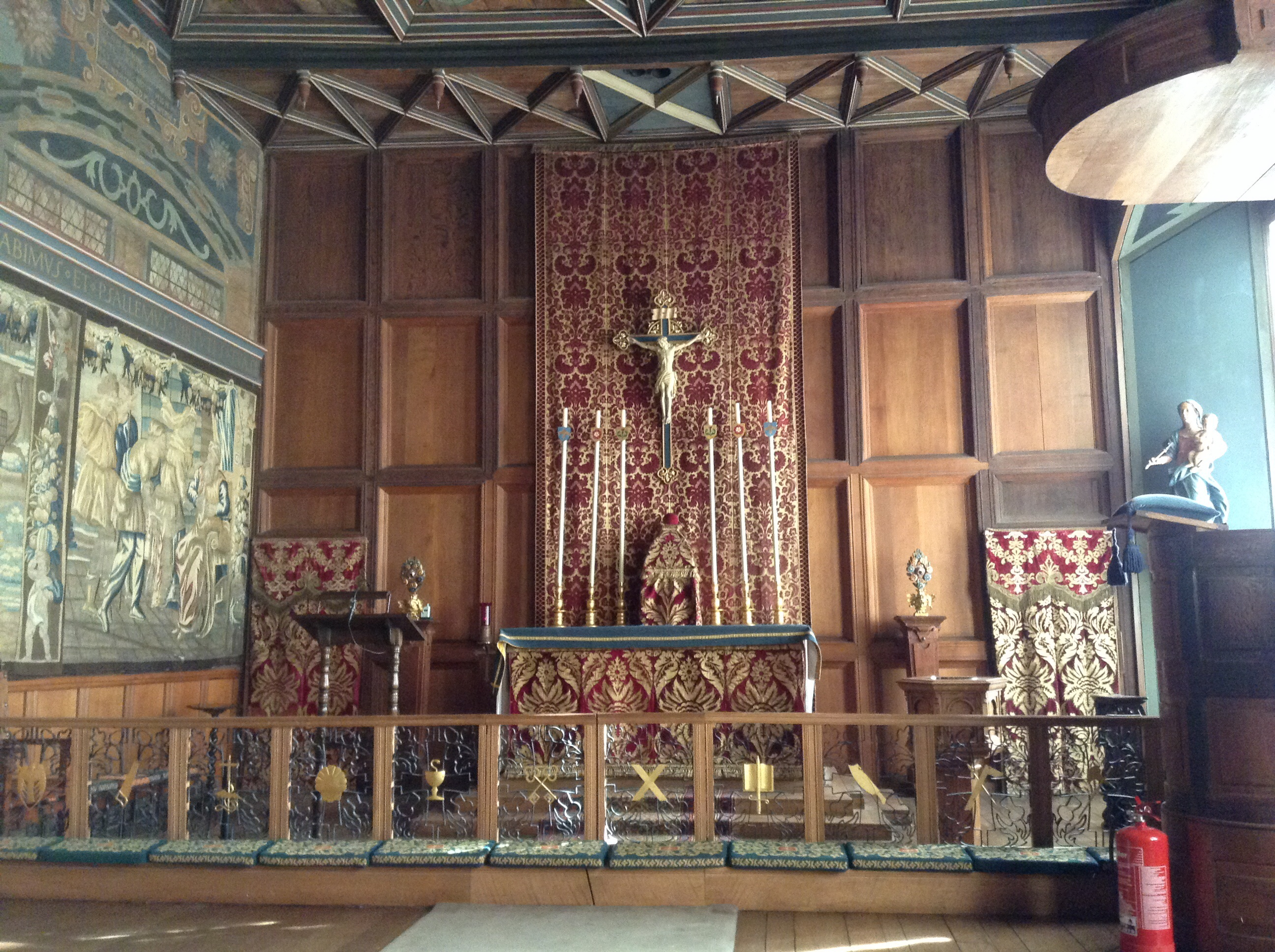
Chapel Royal inside the South Range of Falkland Palace

Some sandstone for the palace was quarried locally. Limestone for lime mortar was found and burnt on the Lomond Hills. In 1540, harder sandstone was quarried at Kingoodie near Dundee and shipped across the Tay to the haven of Lindores Abbey. Much of the timber, including imported "Eastland boards", deals, and rafters supplied by a Danish merchant called "Kinnereis", was bought at St Andrews and Dundee, where it was bound together into rafts called "floats" and towed to Newburgh or Lindores and Levenmouth. Other timber was bought at Leith at Kirkcaldy.

== Description ==
The palace has two wings arranged in an 'L' shape, now called the South and East Quarters or Ranges. The palace courtyard is entered through the gatehouse tower at the west end of the South Quarter. The external ashlar façade of the South Quarter has gunloops at basement level. Above these are the small windows of the private lodgings, and on the second level the large paired windows of the Chapel Royal. Between these windows are weathered niches and statues. The corbels show the instruments of the passion; the chapel at Falkland was dedicated to St Thomas and is the Catholic parish church for Falkland with Mass every Sunday at 9 a.m.

The wallhead is finished with a decorated cornice and battlement which continues around the west side of the gate tower. To the east of the chapel there is small rectangular sectioned tower which once housed a circular staircase, and beyond is the partly reconstructed gable of the East Quarter. Although some writers have attributed part of the South Quarter to the time of James IV, the form of the gunloops, the continuous parapet, and the documented payments to Peter the Flemishman for the 5 statues in 1539 adequately demonstrate that the present appearance dates from the works of James V. The entrance tower was built in 1541, and the accounts record the work of two master masons: "to John Brownhill and Henry Bawtie for complete ending of the fore entry and tower ... and raising of certain chimneys in the south quarter." Within the gate tower and south quarter, visitors can view the Keeper's Apartments in the tower, the Chapel Royal and gallery.

The East Quarter, apart from its courtyard façade is ruined. The centrally placed access tower, the Crosshouse, was reconstructed by the Marquis of Bute. The National Trust's architect, Schomberg Scott recreated the King and Queen's bedchambers within. The northern section of the East Quarter was originally a lodging built by James IV. The East Quarter was remodelled by the mason John Merlioun in 1538. This part of the building, with its "back galleries" overlooking the garden was decayed in 1615. In 1616 the master of works, James Murray was ordered to repair the flat roof of the King and Queen's galleries and the roof of the lodging of the East Quarter in anticipation of the visit of James VI.

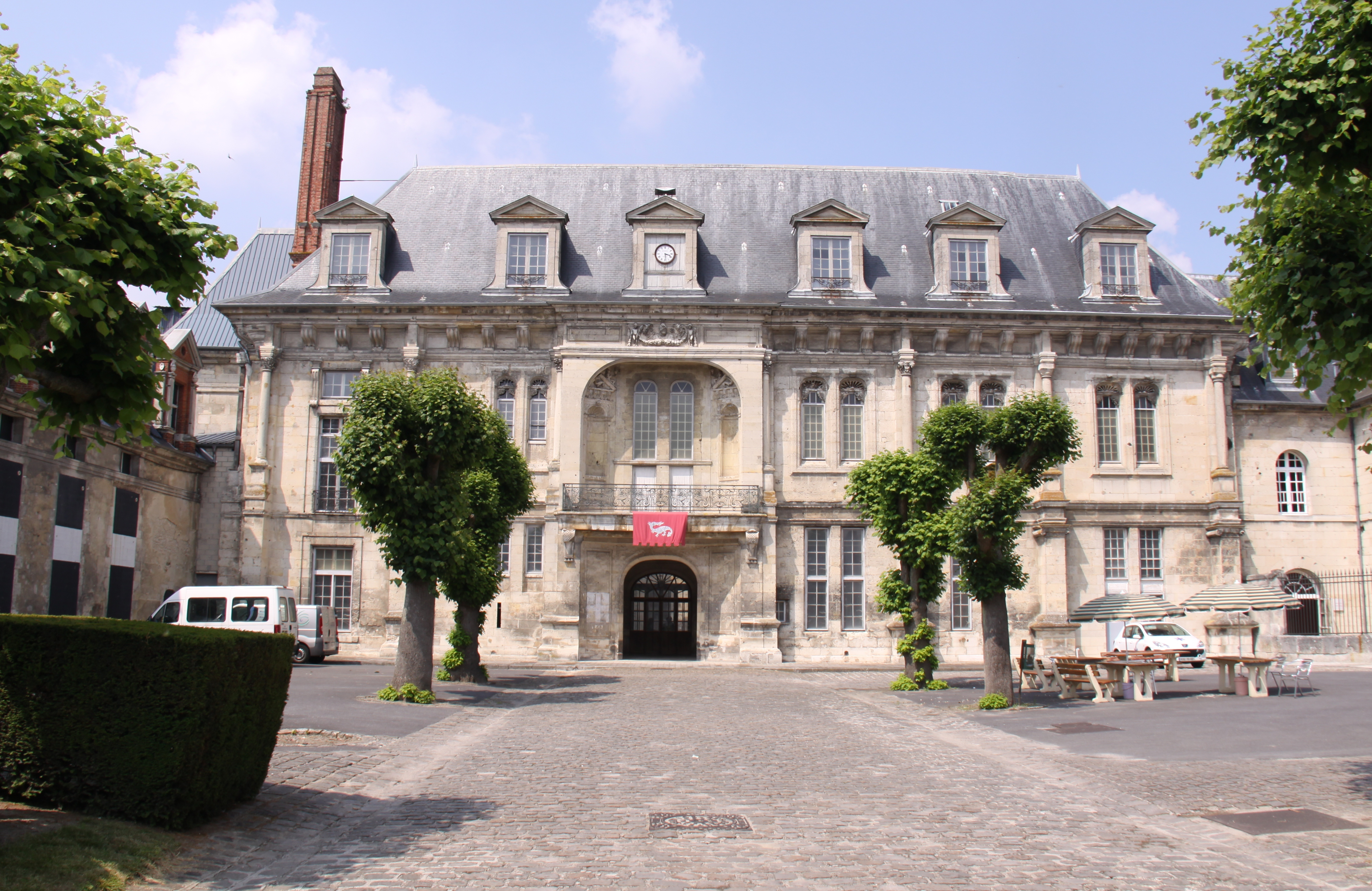
Comparable façade at Villers-Cotterêts

The South and East courtyard façades were decorated and unified with pilasters in a French Renaissance style between 1537 and 1542. Their appearance is comparable to the French Chateau of Villers-Cotterêts. The buttresses on the East are dated 1537, and on the South, where the masonry is more sophisticated, 1539. The later work may be connected with the arrival of Nicolas Roy, a French mason sent to Scotland in March 1539 by Antoinette of Bourbon, the mother of Mary of Guise.

The chapel ceiling dates from the time of James V, as recent dendrochronology work by the AOC Group has confirmed. It was constructed by the carpenter Richard Stewart, and was re-decorated for the visit of Charles I in 1633. James Murray, master of works, was ordered to repair the roof of the South Quarter in 1625, with instructions to "have a special care and regard" that the great ceiling of the Chapel be "preserved and kept as far as possibly may be."

The tennis court, Cross House, and the east turnpike stair turret were plastered and harled for James V by John Kelly and John Malcolm alias Callum. Some of the interiors were plastered by a French specialist craftsman Hector Beato.

The courtyard was originally completed on the north with a great hall to the north. The footprint of the building was established by excavation and laid out with paving slabs by the 3rd Marquis of Bute. Beyond this area are the reconstructed footings of Falkland Castle. This was the site of the short-lived Nether Palace or Castlestead in the 17th century, known from a plan and elevation drawn by Alexander Edward.

== Real tennis court ==
On the lower ground in the gardens, slightly beyond the remains of the medieval castle uncovered c. 1900, lies the original real tennis court. The masons William Mason and Alexander Allardice, and others built the tennis court. Its walls were finished by Callum the pargeoner, or lime plasterer. It is the world's oldest tennis court still in use. The roofed spectator area is home to a number of swallows during spring and summer. The court is home to the Falkland Palace Royal Tennis Club.

== See also ==
- Scheduled monuments in Fife
