= Listed buildings in Arthuret =

Arthuret is a civil parish in the Cumberland district of Cumbria, England. It contains 25 listed buildings that are recorded in the National Heritage List for England. Of these, five are listed at Grade II*, the middle of the three grades, and the others are at Grade II, the lowest grade. The parish includes the small town of Longtown and is otherwise mainly rural. Two buildings originated as fortified towers, Netherby Hall, which has been expanded converted into a country house, and Brackenhill Tower, which is part of a farm. These, and structures associated with them, are listed. Some of the listed buildings are in Longtown, including houses, hotels, a bridge, and a church. Outside these areas the listed buildings include another church with associated structures, including a holy well, and milestones.

== Key ==
Grade	Criteria
II*	Particularly important buildings of more than special interest
II	Buildings of national importance and special interest

== Buildings ==
Name and location	Photograph	Date	Notes	Grade
Churchyard cross 54.99957°N 2.97240°W	—	12th or 13th century	The cross is in the churchyard of St Michael's Church. It is in sandstone, and consists of a square socket base, a tapering shaft carved with crosses, and a wheel head cross.	II*
Netherby Hall; 55.03550°N 2.94569°W		15th century	Originally a tower house, it was altered and extended in 1639, in the late 18th century, and again in 1883, creating a country house, much of it in Scottish baronial style. It is built in sandstone with slate roofs, and has a complex plan. Its long east front includes, from the right, a low three-bay servants' hall, another three-bay section, a taller 18th-century three bay section, the original three-storey pele tower, much altered and including the statue of a knight in a niche and corner tourelles, a taller octagonal entrance tower, and lower sections at the left. The west front has a five-bay two-storey block, flanked by canted bay windows, and three-bay wings with 1 1/2 storeys on each side.	II*
Brackenhill Tower; 55.01682°N 2.86839°W	—	1586	A fortified house that was extended in 1717 and again in 1860. The original part is in sandstone on a chamfered plinth, and consists of a square tower with two storeys and a basement, a corbelled battlemented parapet, and with a gabled slate roof within the parapet. The 1717 extension is in brick with a green slate roof, and has two storeys and three bays, and the 1860 extension is in sandstone, it has two storeys, quoins, a corbelled battlemented parapet, and a flat roof.	II*
St Michael's Church; 54.99968°N 2.97172°W		1609	The tower was completed in about 1700, and the church was restored in 1868. It is built in red and yellow sandstone, it has green slate roofs, and is in Perpendicular style. The church consists of a nave with a clerestory and chancel, both flanked by aisles. At the west end is a three-stage tower incorporating a porch, with stepped angle buttresses, string courses, a battlemented parapet, corner pinnacles, and a weathervane. The parapets of the aisles and nave are also battlemented, and have finials.	II*
St Michael's Well; 55.00052°N 2.97240°W		Early 17th century (probable)	A holy well in sandstone that has a well head with a pointed arch and a recessed bowl. There is a retaining wall, and steps lead down to paving and a stone trough.	II
Longtown Bridge; 55.01066°N 2.97479°W		1756	The bridge carries the A7 road over the River Esk, and was widened in 1889. It is in sandstone, and consists of five segmental arches, with recessed voussoirs, and is carried on four splayed piers. The bridge has solid parapets with chamfered copings and a datestone. In the centre is a cast iron lamp post.	II
56 English Street and Nook House; 55.00693°N 2.97107°W	—	Late 18th century	Two houses at right angles, the older being No. 56 English Street. It is in brick on a chamfered stone plinth, and has a slate roof, two storeys and three bays. The doorway has a fanlight with a moulded round arch and a false keystone, and the windows are sashes. Nook House dates from the early 19th century, it is stuccoed with angle pilasters, and has two storeys and five bays. Above the doorway is a fanlight with a segmental head, and the windows are sashes.	II
Brackenhill Farmhouse; 55.01663°N 2.86860°W	—	Late 18th century	The farmhouse is in calciferous sandstone on a squared plinth, with quoins and it has a Welsh slate roof with coped gables. There are two storeys with attics, five bays, and a granary wing at right angles. The doorway has a moulded architrave with a pulvinated frieze and a moulded cornice. The windows are sashes in raised stone surrounds. The granary wing has external steps leading to a first-floor loft door and a pulley swing bar.	II
Barns, Brackenhill Farm; 55.01686°N 2.86933°W	—	Late 18th century	The barns are in sandstone, they have roofs of varying materials, and form three sides of the farmyard. They contain an arched entrance to the farmyard, and various openings, including a cart entrance, doors and windows, and there are external stone steps leading to a loft door.	II
Graham Arms Hotel; 55.00857°N 2.97162°W		Late 18th century	The hotel is rendered on a chamfered stone plinth, and has stone dressings and a hipped slate roof. There are three storeys and five bays, the outer bays projecting and canted. On the front is a prostyle Doric porch and a doorway with a fanlight in a moulded architrave. The windows are sashes. To the right is a 19th-century extension with two storeys and three bays, containing an archway.	II
Coop House; 55.03400°N 2.96110°W		1778–82	Originally a keeper's house, it is in sandstone on a chamfered plinth, with quoins, a string course, and a battlemented parapet. There are three bays. The central bay has a single storey and contains a doorway with a pointed arch, a hood mould, and cruciform openings. This is flanked by two-storey towers with mullioned windows.	II*
2 and 4A Graham Street; 55.00990°N 2.97049°W	—	1810	A pair of rendered houses on a chamfered plinth, with pilastered quoins, a moulded cornice, and a Welsh slate roof with a coped gable. There are two storeys and each house has two bays. The round-headed doorways are paired in the centre and have radial fanlights in pilastered surrounds, and moulded arches with false keystones. In the centre is a shared Venetian window, the middle recess being blind. The other windows are sashes.	II
Bush Hotel; 55.00954°N 2.97258°W		Early 19th century (probable)	A stuccoed public house on a square plinth, with quoins and a Welsh slate roof. There are two storeys and three bays. The doorway has a pilastered surround and a modillioned cornice, and the windows are sashes with hood moulds on console brackets. In the right return is a cart entrance.	II
Globe Tavern; 55.00908°N 2.97312°W		Early 19th century	Originally a house and stable, it was redesigned in 1916, and used as a public house. It is in red sandstone, and has green slate roofs with coped gables. The left section has two storeys and three bays, and the right section is in one storey with six bays. The doorway has a fanlight and a quoined surround, and the windows are sashes with plain surrounds.	II
Coachman's House and stables, Netherby Hall; 55.03591°N 2.94591°W	—	Early 19th century	The buildings are in sandstone, partly stuccoed, and have Welsh slate roofs. The house has two storeys, three bays and sash windows. The stables also have two storeys, they almost enclose the four sides of the courtyard, and they incorporate a clock tower in an angle. The tower is square and has quoins, string courses, louvred vents, and a clock face in the wall facing the house.	II
South Lodge; 55.02584°N 2.95515°W		Early 19th century	The lodge to Netherby Hall is in painted stone and has a hipped Welsh slate roof. It has one storey and three bays. The roof projects over the eaves and is carried on square wooden pillars. There are extensions to the main block with decorative bargeboards, a three-light casement window and a narrow round-headed window, both in chamfered surrounds.	II
Ice House, Netherby Hall; 55.03759°N 2.94410°W	—	Early 19th century (probable)	The ice house is in sandstone and brick, and is built into a bank. It has a passage with outer and inner doors that have stone surrounds. The ice pit is in brick and is domed, and there are the remains of an inner wooden wall.	II
Milestone near Netherby Hall; 55.02843°N 2.94743°W	—	Early 19th century	The milestone was provided for the Longtown to Penton road. It is in sandstone, it has a rounded top, and carries a cast iron plate inscribed with the distance in miles to Carlisle.	II
Milestone, Longtown; 55.00615°N 2.96993°W	—	Early 19th century (probable)	The milestone was provided for the Carlisle to Longtown turnpike. It is in sandstone, it has a rounded top, and carries two cast iron plates inscribed with the distances in miles, one to Carlisle, and the other to Longtown.	II
Milestone, Hopesike Woods; 54.99361°N 2.95697°W	—	Early 19th century (probable)	The milestone was provided for the Carlisle to Longtown turnpike. It is in sandstone, it has a rounded top, and carries two cast iron plates inscribed with the distances in miles, one to Carlisle, and the other to Longtown. On top of the stone is a benchmark.	II
Carwinley Mill; 55.04733°N 2.93436°W	—	1826	Originally the miller's house, it is in sandstone with quoins and has a hipped green slate roof. There is a projecting two-storey bay with a single-storey porch on the left. To the right is a 1 1/2 bay that has a doorway with a chamfered arch. There is also a canted bay window with a sash window below, and a double round-arched casement window above, and a triple casement window with a hood and a coat of arms above.	II
St Andrew's Church; 55.01043°N 2.97282°W		1834	A Church of Scotland church in sandstone, with quoins and a slate roof. It has 1 1/2 storeys and two bays. The doorway, with a fanlight, and the sash windows have pointed heads and contain intersecting tracery.	II
East Lodge; 55.03319°N 2.93911°W		Early to mid 19th century	The lodge to Netherby Hall is in sandstone with a Welsh slate roof, and has two storeys and three bays. There is a two-storey gabled porch containing a square-headed door and a hood mould. The windows are sashes in chamfered surrounds and with hood moulds, and the gables have decorated bargeboards.	II
Churchyard wall, St Michael's Church; 54.99964°N 2.97134°W		Mid 19th century	The wall on the east side of the churchyard is in sandstone with rounded coping. It contains two entrances with square gate piers. The left entrance has a scrolled wrought iron overthrow with a lamp, and there is a cast iron lamp standard on the right pier of the other entrance.	II
Suspension Bridge; 55.03855°N 2.95264°W		1877	A footbridge over the River Esk, There is a square iron pylon on each bank supporting steel wires and a wooden walkway. It carries a painted warning notice dated 1904.	II
