= Kinmont Willie Armstrong =

Scottish border reiver and outlaw

William Armstrong of Kinmont or Kinmont Willie was a Scottish border reiver and outlaw active in the Anglo-Scottish Border country in the last decades of the 16th century.

He lived at the Tower of Sark, close to the border between Scotland and England, north of the centre of the border line. The tower was built for his father Alexander "Lang Sandie" Armstrong, son of Christopher "of Langholm" Armstrong, son of Alexander "Sandie" Armstrong 6th laird of Mangerton(1445), and although now demolished the site is marked by a monument unveiled in 1996. William had at least six sons based on historical and genealogical sources: John (Jock) Armstrong, Archibald Armstrong, Robert Armstrong, George (Geordy) Armstrong, Father of Adam Armstrong (1612) Francis Armstrong, Ecky (Ekke) Armstrong, Some of these sons, including Jock, Archibald, and others, were directly involved in his legendary rescue from Carlisle Castle.

== The raid on Carlisle ==
Perhaps the best known of the Border reivers (outlaw raiders or rustlers), William Armstrong of Kinmont's first recorded raid was against the Milburns of Tynedale in August 1583, when Armstrong was probably in his forties. In that raid he led 300 reivers into North Tynedale where they stole cattle, horses and sheep, burnt 60 houses and killed 10 men In 1585 he accompanied the Earl of Angus's campaign against the Earl of Arran and pillaged Stirling. In October 1587 he led 400 Scottish attackers in a raid that led to the partial destruction of Haydon Bridge Eight years later he was in Tynedale again with 1,000 men, carrying off over 2,000 beasts and £300 in spoils.

Armstrong was captured in violation of a border truce day in 1596. At a Truce Day all who attended to witness the criminal trials were granted "safe conduct" for the Day and until the following sunrise. Kinmont was arrested by the deputies of the English warden Lord Scrope and imprisoned in Carlisle Castle. The Scottish warden of the West March Walter Scott of Buccleuch, Keeper of Liddesdale, protested to Lord Scrope. When Scrope refused to release Armstrong, Buccleuch led a party of men on a daring raid into England and broke Armstrong out of the castle with inside help from the English Grahams and Carletons. Elizabeth I of England was furious that one of her Border fortresses had been broken into at a time when peace existed between England and Scotland. Her relationship with James VI of Scotland was tested. Elizabeth demanded that Buccleuch and Walter Kerr of Cessford should be sent to England.

James VI was caught between allegiance to the Scots who were adamant Buccleuch had done no wrong in rescuing a man who was captured illegally and his desire to pander to his English benefactor, Elizabeth. She threatened to suspend a yearly subsidy that she sent to James VI. Buccleuch eventually freely rode from King James to Queen Elizabeth. After their audience, Queen Elizabeth said: "With ten thousand such men, our brother in Scotland might shake the firmest throne of Europe."

A contemporary Scottish narrative written around 1603, after the death of Elizabeth, gives more details on Armstrong, Buccleuch, and the raid on Carlisle Castle. Armstrong was riding home in Liddesdale when he was pursued by 200 followers of the English deputy, Thomas Salkeld. He was captured after a chase of four miles and taken to Carlisle. The Laird of Buccleuch complained to the deputy and the warden Lord Scrope, and also asked Sir Robert Bowes to write to Scrope. Buccleuch received no reply and interpreted this as an insult to James VI. He sent men to Carlisle to examine a postern gate and the height of the walls. A woman went into the castle as a visitor to identify where Armstrong was held. He mustered 200 men at the Tower of Morton (Sark Tower) on the River Sark with scaling ladders and siege tools. They reached Stanwix Bank to cross the River Eden two hours before dawn. The ladders were too short so his men broke through the wall near the postern gate. They fought with the watchmen and sentinels while Scrope and Salkeld and their men held back, and then withdrew with Armstrong and some other prisoners. According to this narrative, Buccleuch returned the other prisoners and looted goods, and only the gate and prison door were damaged.

In July 1596 Armstrong was said to have captured Thomas Musgrave, Captain of Bewcastle, in Scotland and transferred him to royal custody at Hawick. James VI was said to be pleased because Musgrave was a lawful prisoner in comparison with Armstrong's recent detention at Carlisle Castle. In 1600, Armstrong attacked the village of Scotby with 140 riders, burning and taking prisoners and cattle. In 1602 he rode his last foray, south of Carlisle. He was still alive two years later, and his four sons who had helped to get him out of Carlisle Castle are frequently named in the later Border raids. Legend supposes he died in his bed of old age, sometime between 1608 and 1611.

The story of the raid on Carlisle Castle is told in the ballad "Kinmont Willie".

== Diplomacy and the English subsidy ==
Since 1586 Queen Elizabeth had sent James VI a yearly sum of money or subsidy. Because of the Kinmont Willie incident, she delayed or refused to give the money to David Foulis who waited in London. James VI wrote to Foulis to continue asking for the money, and pointed to agreements made in 1588 during the crisis of the Spanish Armada and a promise made by the ambassador William Asheby.

A Scottish diplomat (and former court musician) James Hudson wrote to Sir Robert Cecil about the king's letter, saying that Foulis was "perplexed with fear" about the outcome. Hudson suggested that Scotland's exchequer was now solvent, and withholding the money would only hurt the king and Thomas Foulis and Robert Jousie who administered the money. The Scottish financial administration known as the Octavians claimed they could manage without the English subsidy. Roger Aston later noted that Thomas Foulis and Jousie had persuaded James VI not to recall Foulis before he obtained the subsidy money. Elizabeth decided to make a payment after James had imprisoned Buccleuch at St Andrews and made a statement against any rehabilitation of the Catholic earls. David Foulis received £3,000 on 18 September. There were rumours that James VI would no longer ask for payments, but the arrangements continued.

== The Sword and the Story ==
A sword in the collection of the Annan Museum collection has an old label identifying it as Kinmont Willie's sword. The sword is of the right age and typology.

== Sources ==
- Grundy, John (2022). History of Northumberland. Newcastle upon Tyne: Tyne Bridge Publishing. ISBN 9781838280970.
