= Brackenhill Tower =

Peel tower in Arthuret, Cumbria, England, UK

Coordinates: 55°01′00″N 2°52′06″W

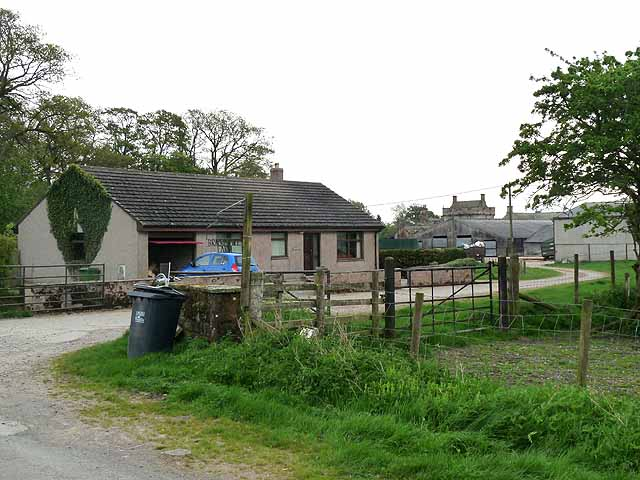
Brackenhill Farm and Tower

Brackenhill Tower is a peel tower, in the parish of Arthuret, in Cumbria, just north of the River Lyne. The site is about 2 miles (3.2 km) north of Kirklinton and 4 miles (6.4 km) east of Longtown, or 10 miles (16 km) north of Carlisle and 8 miles (13 km) east of Gretna Green, and is a good defensive position, with ravines to the north and south. Extensions were added in the 18th and 19th centuries, but the original tower has had little alteration. It is the only remaining example of a Scottish tower house south of the border with England, and became a Grade II* listed building in 1957.

== Tower ==
The tower was built in 1584 by the border reiver Richie Graham (a stone on the tower gives the date as 1586). It replaced an earlier tower on the same site, which may have been built in the 13th century or possibly earlier. In June 1596, Graham was accused of hosting a coiner making counterfeit money in a room in his tower at Brackenhill. Thomas Musgrave of Bewcastle was captured by Scottish reivers at the gates in July 1596 when the Grahams refused him a refuge.

It was constructed from large irregular blocks of red Cumbrian sandstone to a simple rectangular plan, with sides measuring 11 metres (36 ft) by 8 metres (26 ft), and walls 40 feet (12 m) high and 5 feet (1.5 m) thick. There are two upper storeys above a vaulted basement, with a corner spiral staircase and originally a first-floor exterior door. The tower has a double gabled slate roof, with corbelled and battlemented parapet and stepped gables. There is little alteration to the exterior: for example, most of the narrow windows remain and were not enlarged as was typical when medieval buildings remained in use through the Georgian period.

== Extensions ==
In 1717, Richard Graham constructed a brick cottage to the south east of the tower, of three bays and two storeys. Around this time, a new west doorway added to basement of the tower, and first floor external door was blocked. The attic was renovated around this time, and two end chimneys added. The timber roof trusses were replaced either at this renovation or later in the 19th century.

The building was sold to the Stephenson family near the end of the 18th century (they later became the Standish family). In 1860 they added a new dining room and kitchen in a two-storey extension constructed from dressed red sandstone, with a canted bay window. They also added a stone link between the tower and the brick cottage, adding a battlemented porch to the tower, decorated with the Standish family coat of arms. The Standish family used the building as a hunting lodge, with the grounds landscaped to form a hunting estate.

== Recent history ==
The Carlyle family held a lease of the building by the end of the Second World War. They bought the freehold when the Standish family sold in 1946. The surrounding land was used as a dairy farm.

The building remained in private hands into the 21st century, but fell into disrepair. It was one of three buildings included as candidates for restoration from the North West of England in the first BBC television programme Restoration in 2003, the other buildings being Bank Hall in Bretherton and the eventual winner, Victoria Baths in Manchester. It was included in the English Heritage Buildings at Risk Register, but repairs were completed in 2010 and it is used as holiday accommodation.

== See also ==
- Grade II* listed buildings in Cumberland
- Listed buildings in Arthuret
