= Raith =

Raith may refer to:

== People ==
- Robert Ferguson of Raith (1769–1840), Scottish politician
- John Melville of Raith (died 1548), Scottish laird executed for treason
- Julius Raith (1819–1862), German-American military officer
- Sissy Raith (born 1960), German female association footballer
- Thomas Raith, fictional vampire in the contemporary fantasy series The Dresden Files by Jim Butcher

== Other uses ==
- Ráith, an Irish word for ringfort
- Raith, Fife, one-time area of Fife
- Raith, Ontario, a dispersed rural community and unincorporated area
- Raith Rovers F.C., a Scottish association football club based in the town of Kirkcaldy, Fife
- Ràth, a Scottish Gaelic term for a fort or fortified residence, particularly one surrounded by an earthen rampart, featuring in many placenames, including a major road interchange (M74 / A725) in South Lanarkshire

== See also ==
- John Jeremiah McRaith (1934–2017), American prelate of the Roman Catholic Church
- Battle of Raith, a theory regarding the site of the Battle of Catraeth, now largely dismissed
