= Let sleeping dogs lie =

English proverb

"Let sleeping dogs lie" is an English proverb known at least since the 14th century. This saying suggests that when an old problem is no longer causing anyone trouble, it might be better left undiscussed: "Possibly he cohabited with Miss Bloggs, but don't mention it in front of his wife, let the sleeping dogs lie", and dormant controversies should not be restarted even if they were never resolved. This intent is similar to the meanings of sayings like "Don't rock the boat", "Never trouble trouble till trouble troubles you".

== History ==
An early version in Middle English: "It is nought good a slepyng hound to wake" belongs to Chaucer (c. 1385 AD, "Troilus and Criseyde", III.764) and is predated by earlier French: n'ésveillez pas lou chien qui dort, "wake not the sleeping dog" (early 14th century). The Chaucer's character, Pandarus, when uttering the phrase, is speaking literally, referring to Criseyde's ladies sleeping outside her chamber.

The Oxford Dictionary of Proverbs traces the following evolution of the saying:

- Middle English: It is euill wakyng of a slepyng dog (1546, John Heywood in "A Dialogue Conteinyng the Nomber in Effect of All the Prouerbes in the Englishe Tongues");
- It's best To let a sleeping mastiff rest (1681, Samuel Colvil in "The Whiggs Supplication");
- Take my advice and [ask] as little about him as he does about you. Best to let sleeping dogs lie (the first known use of the modern phrasing, 1824, Walter Scott in the "Redgauntlet").

In the 19th century the modern version was already popular. Widespread use in the 20th century (see Bryan and Mieder for some literary sources) made the proverb very recognizable, enabling some significant modifications, from "It is my policy to let sleeping senators lie" (Gore Vidal attacking his opponent Senator S. I. Hayakawa who was prone to napping in the chamber) to “let sleeping dogmas lie” (Edmund Gosse).

== Other languages ==
The German: Schlafende Hunde ("sleeping dog") was an idiom for a dangerous subject that should not be touched upon since at least the 16th century. The form of expression varies. German: schlafende Hunde wecken ("to wake the sleeping dogs") is to create an inconvenience to oneself by attracting attention.

Italian: non svegliare il can che dorme dates back to c. 1345, when Bosone da Gubbio made a wordplay (Italian: non sveglian lo can che dorme) on an Italian: gran Can del Catai, the Chinese Emperor.

Expression is known in Russian, usually in the form Russian: не буди лихо, пока оно тихо, "don't wake up trouble while it is quiet".

In Swedish, the expression is practically the same as in English, but the dog is replaced by a bear: Swedish: väck inte den björn som sover, "don't wake a sleeping bear".

The idiom is unfamiliar to the speakers of Arabic who mostly fail to recognize its meaning.

== See also ==
- The dogs of war (phrase)

== Sources ==
- Jarvie, G. (2009). Bloomsbury Dictionary of Idioms. Bloomsbury Publishing. ISBN 978-1-4081-2492-5.
- Mamatas, Nick (2013). "Let sleeping dogs lie". Quotes Every Man Should Know. Stuff You Should Know. Quirk Books. p. 107. ISBN 978-1-59474-656-7.
- Grimm, Brothers (1854). "HUND". Deutsches Wörterbuch (in German).
- Голицына, Н. (2023). "Dog". Английские идиомы. 500 самых употребительных устойчивых выражений [English Idioms] (in Russian). АСТ. ISBN 978-5-04-589650-4.
- Al Kayed, Murad; Alkayid, Majd; Essa, Lama Bani (2023). "A contrastive study of the connotative meanings of "dog-related" expressions in English and Jordanian proverbs: Implications for translators and language teachers". Acta Linguistica Petropolitana. 19 (19–1): 66–101.
- Bryan, G.B.; Mieder, W. (2005). A Dictionary of Anglo-American Proverbs & Proverbial Phrases, Found in Literary Sources of the Nineteenth and Twentieth Centuries. G - Reference, Information and Interdisciplinary Subjects Series. Peter Lang. ISBN 978-0-8204-7947-7.
- West, David (2012). "(Review of) Stylistic Use of Phraseological Units in Discourse" (PDF). Changing English, Routledge Journal. 19.
- Schilling, Silvia (2018). "Let sleeping dogs lie". An Analysis of English Expressions Concerning Cats and Dogs. Bod Third Party Titles. p. 3. ISBN 978-3-346-13425-7.
- Speake, J. (2015). "Let SLEEPING dogs lie". Oxford Dictionary of Proverbs. Oxford Quick Reference. OUP Oxford. ISBN 978-0-19-105959-9.
- Ayto, John (2020-06-18). "let sleeping dogs lie". Oxford Dictionary of Idioms. Oxford, United Kingdom; New York, NY: Oxford University Press, USA. ISBN 978-0-19-884562-1. OCLC 1151947753.
- Manser, M.H.; Fergusson, R.; Pickering, D. (2007). "let sleeping dogs lie". The Facts on File Dictionary of Proverbs. Facts on File library of language and literature. Facts On File. ISBN 978-0-8160-6673-5.
- Leininger, Lorie Jerrell (1960). Chaucer's Use of Proverbs in the Troilus and Criseyde (PDF) (Master of Arts thesis). University of Arizona.
- Ruef, H. (1995). Sprichwort und Sprache: am Beispiel des Sprichworts im Schweizerdeutschen. Studia linguistica Germanica (in German). W. de Gruyter. ISBN 978-3-11-014494-9.
- Duden – Redewendungen: Wörterbuch der deutschen Idiomatik. Duden - Deutsche Sprache in 12 Bänden (in German). Duden. 2020. ISBN 978-3-411-91305-3.
- Mayer, S. (2015). Italienisch lernen: italienische Sprichwörter - Redewendungen - Ausdrücke (in German). Sabine Mayer. ISBN 978-605-038-952-4.
- Mosti, Rossella (2014). "Italiano antico e italiano moderno: notizie dal TLIO". Italogramma (in Italian). 7.
- Norrick, Neal R. (1985). How Proverbs Mean: Semantic Studies in English Proverbs. Trends in Linguistics: Studies and monographs. Berlin, New York, Amsterdam: Mouton Publishers. ISBN 3-11-010196-3. LCCN 85-4837.
