= John Boswell of Balmuto =

Scottish landowner and courtier

John Boswell of Balmuto (1546–1610) was a Scottish landowner and courtier.

He was the son of David Boswell and Elizabeth Wemyss, daughter of David Wemyss of Wemyss. His father died at the battle of Pinkie in 1547.

Their lands were at Balmuto Castle in Fife. Mary, Queen of Scots visited Balmuto in February 1565. The English diplomat Thomas Randolph said that David Boswell was an "inveterate Papist", but his seven sons were Protestants.

Christian Boswell, a sister of John Boswell, married James Melville of Halhill, and was the mother of the poet Elizabeth Melville. Her tomb can be seen at Collessie.

John Boswell inherited the family estates from his grandfather in 1582. He also inherited a feud with the Wemyss family, in part over the fishing rights at Loch Gelly. The young James VI of Scotland declared he was on the side of the Wemyss family, while playing a game at Linlithgow Palace.

He was prosperous, and lent 1000 merks to James VI in September 1589, to help finance his marriage to Anne of Denmark. The king wrote for the loan on 2 September from Falkland Palace, because of the "hastier arrival of our dearest spouse, than either we looked for, or can have any time for the preparation thereof". James Fenton, the comptroller clerk, made out a receipt on 17 September 1589 for £666 received at Leith from the Laird's brother, the king's surgeon George Boswell. Anne of Denmark's arrival was delayed by contrary winds.

John Boswell was knighted in August 1594 at Stirling Castle, at the baptism of Prince Henry.

A carved stone at Balmuto is inscribed, "I.B.I.S. 1594", for John Boswell and his wife Isabella Sandilands, or his son John and Jonet Scott.

== Marriage and children ==
He married Elizabeth or Isobella Sandilands in 1562, a daughter of Sir James Sandilands of Cruvie and St Monans (died 1568) and Elizabeth Meldrum. Their children included:

- John Boswell of Balmuto, who was also knighted in August 1594 at Stirling. He married Jonet Scott, daughter of James Scott of Balwearie
- George Boswell of Balgonie in Auchterderran. He married Elizabeth Hay (died 1615), daughter of Patrick Hay of Megginch and Isobel Bryson, and widow of John Haliday (died 1606) of Tullibole. She may have been the Elizabeth Hay who helped in the household of Princess Elizabeth at Linlithgow Palace.
- James Boswell of Lochgelly
- David Boswell of Craigincat, who was in trouble in 1594 as a follower of the rebel Francis Stewart, 5th Earl of Bothwell. In 1610 his horse won a silver bell at a race held at Dunfermline.
- Grizel Boswell, who married James Law, Archbishop of Glasgow
