= Elizabeth Melville =

Scottish poet

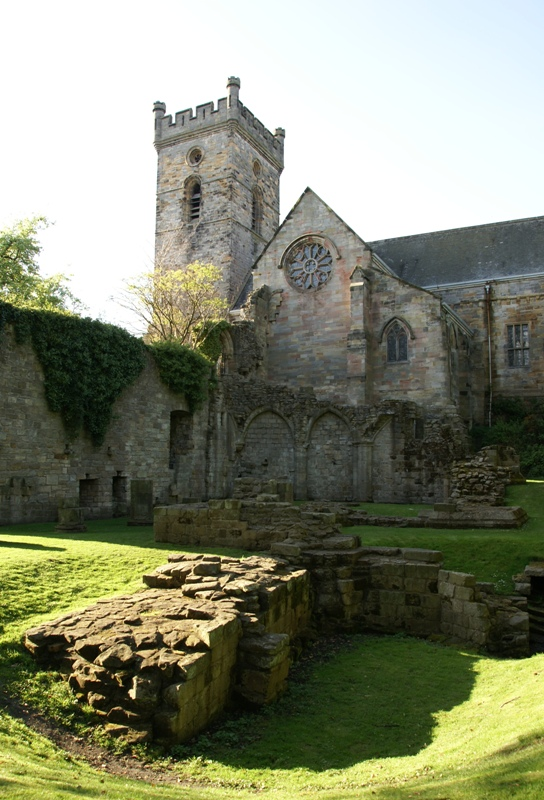
Culross Abbey Kirk, where Elizabeth Melville worshipped.

Elizabeth Melville, Lady Culross (c.1578–c.1640) was a Scottish poet. In 1603 she became the earliest known Scottish woman writer to see her work in print, when the Edinburgh publisher Robert Charteris issued the first edition of Ane Godlie Dreame, a Calvinist dream-vision poem. An inscribed flagstone commemorating Melville as one of Scotland's great writers was unveiled by Germaine Greer on 21 June 2014 in Makars' Court, Edinburgh. The inscription is a quotation from her Dreame – "Though tyrants threat, though Lyons rage and rore/ Defy them all, and feare not to win out" (edition of 1606).

== Overview ==
A large body of Elizabeth Melville's manuscript verse was discovered in 2002, and her extant poetry runs to some 4,500 lines, written in many different verse-forms. There are also twelve letters, eleven of them holographs. Melville was an active member of the Presbyterian resistance to the ecclesiastical policies of both James VI and Charles I. She was a personal friend of leading figures in the presbyterian opposition, whose frustration eventually erupted in 1637 in the Edinburgh Prayerbook Riots, leading to the National Covenant of February 1638, the Glasgow General Assembly which abolished the episcopate, and the outbreak of the Wars of the Three Kingdoms.

== Family background ==
=== Melvilles ===
Melville's father was the courtier and diplomat Sir James Melville of Halhill (1535–1617), one of the many children of the Fife landowner Sir John Melville of Raith, an early convert to Protestantism who was executed for treasonable communication with the English invaders in 1548. Despite inheriting his father's Protestant convictions, Sir James began his career as a page to Mary, Queen of Scots in France in 1549. Like his brothers Robert Melville of Murdocairnie and Andrew Melville of Garvock, James later served Mary in Scotland, and remained loyal to her after her fall and forced abdication.

The Melville brothers would nonetheless eventually go on to become loyal and valued servants of Mary's son, King James VI of Scotland. Sir Robert Melville became treasurer-depute in 1582, Sir Andrew became master of the household to King James (having served the imprisoned Mary in that capacity during her English captivity), and Sir James Melville would resume his wide-ranging diplomatic activities. His Memoirs of His Own Life, written in old age for the political education of his heir, are a well-known historical source. James Melville's long association with a French court notable for highly educated women, who both wrote and published their works, may well have inspired his decision to have his daughters well educated, presumably at the family home, the long-vanished Halhill Tower near Collessie. Sir James had inherited Halhill from his adoptive father, the lawyer Henry Balnaves, a close friend of the Reformer John Knox. Like Knox, after the siege of St Andrews Castle, Balnaves had been banished to serve a penal sentence in France. The theme of the persecuted Christian elect is prominent in Eizabeth Melville's poetry; between her father's absolute commitment to the Reformed faith, her paternal grandfather's "martyr" status, and the suffering for the faith of her adoptive grandfather Balnaves, her Protestant antecedents were impeccable.

In the summer of 1569, Sir James Melville married Christian Boswell (d.1609), one of the many daughters of David Boswell, laird of Balmuto in Fife. David Boswell was a Catholic who had welcomed a visit of Mary, Queen of Scots to his home in February 1565 as an opportunity to celebrate Mass.

The Boswell family was well-connected to King James VI; George Boswell was a royal surgeon, and David's heir, his grandson John Boswell, laird of Balmuto had lent the king money to help pay for the royal wedding voyage to Scandinavia. He was knighted with his son and heir at the baptism of Prince Henry Frederick in 1594. Sir James Melville and Christian Boswell had five children (dates of birth unknown): James, Robert, Margaret, Elizabeth and Christian. James, who inherited Halhill, shared a father-in-law with Elizabeth, namely Alexander Colville (d.1597), Commendator of the Abbey at Culross, judge and privy councillor. Robert Melville trained for the ministry and for many years assisted the minister of Culross, Mr. Robert Colville, another son of Commendator Alexander. Margaret Melville married Sir Andrew Balfour of Montquhanie in Fife. He was another laird knighted at the baptism of Prince Henry Frederick in 1594. Christian married John Bonar of Lumquhat in Fife.

Archibald Douglas sent Sir James Melville's daughter, presumably Elizabeth, a pair of virginals from London as a present in 1589.

=== Marriage ===
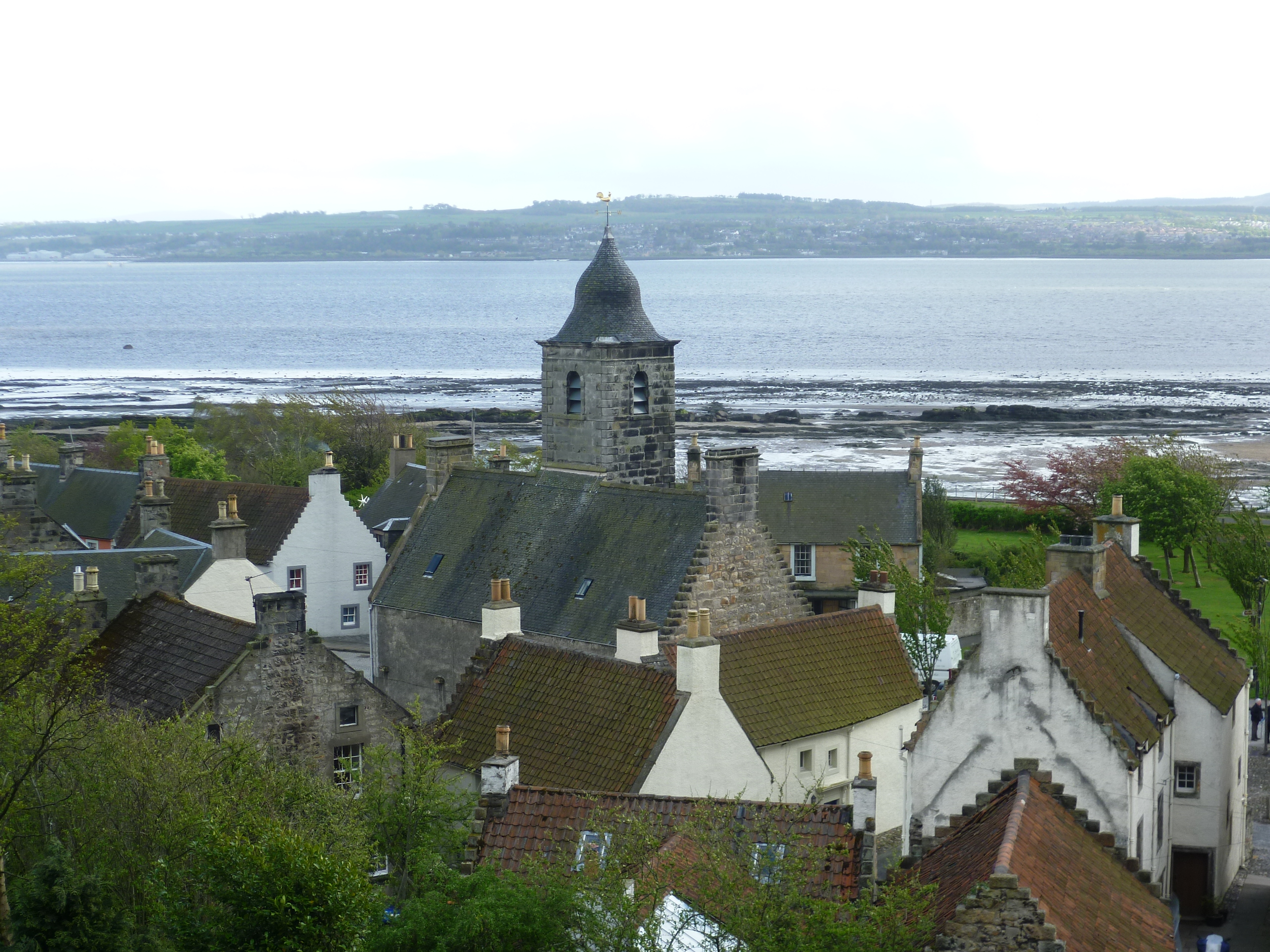
Culross situated on the north coast of the Firth of Forth; the village from which Melville took her courtesy title, Lady Culross.

Elizabeth's marriage contract has not survived, but it is clear from the signatures to a legal document of February 1597 that by that date, she was already married to John Colville. On 16 February 1599, Alexander Hume would end the epistle dedicating his Hymnes and Sacred Songs (Edinburgh, 1599) with the injunction "Love your husband: have a modest care of your family", which suggests the existence of more than one child. John Colville was styled "of West Comrie" (Cumrie Wester, Wester-Cumbrae), an estate a little to the north-east of Culross, and in keeping with the Scottish custom of calling landowners (including farmers) by the name of their property, his wife was initially known as "Lady Comrie". It is incorrect to call her "Elizabeth Colville": Scottish women retained their maiden names after marriage. In addition to West Comrie, John Colville owned the lands of Lurg and Kincardine, just to the west of Culross.

John Colville is frequently described as "John, Lord Colville of Culross", a peerage title that he never held. The "Colville of Culross" peerage was created in 1604 and confirmed in 1609 for John Colville's cousin, Sir James Colville (1550–1629) of East Wemyss. Sir James, 1st Lord Colville of Culross, was the distinguished son of another James Colville, the older half-brother (died 1562) of John Colville's father, Alexander commendator of Culross. Sir James was much-appreciated by King James as a soldier and diplomat. He had fought on behalf of Henri de Navarre during the French Wars of Religion, and retained close links with the French court until the end of his eventful life. His own line failed c.1678, in Ireland, and then the title of Lord Colville came to the descendants of Elizabeth Melville and John Colville of West Comrie, although it was not claimed by them until 1722.

On the death of his father in 1597, John Colville became titular Commendator of Culross. As the title pages of the second and third editions (?1604, 1606) of Ane Godlie Dreame show, Elizabeth Melville soon became known as "Lady Culross younger", rather than "Lady Comrie" (the "elder Lady Culross" was her mother-in-law). She continued to be known as Lady Culross for the rest of her life, despite the fact that John Colville resigned the title of Commendator of Culross in 1609.

Elizabeth's surviving letters, held in Edinburgh University Library, prove that she and John Colville had at least seven children: Alexander, James, Robert, John, Samuel, and at least two daughters: one not mentioned by name, who died before 1625, and Christian. Alexander, Robert, John and the deceased daughter appear in a letter of 29 January 1629 to her son James. The financial problems that Melville recounts in this letter indicate that her husband was a poor estate-manager. From her comments in another letter it seems that John Colville also had shortcomings as a family man: Melville wrote that the death of her clerical brother-in-law Robert was:

a soir strok to this congregatioun, and chiefly to me, to quhom he wes not only a pastour and a brother, bot, under God, a husband and a father to my children. Nixt his awin familie, I have the greattest los

== Elizabeth Melville's children ==
Information about Elizabeth's children is far from plentiful. With the exception of Elizabeth's eldest and youngest sons, Alexander and Samuel, what is known mostly stems from her extant letters, above all from the two she wrote to her son James, in 1625 and 1629. These were edited and published only in 2015. From the first letter, we learn of the daughter whose name is not mentioned, who died piously after a hard struggle at an unknown date; she is also mentioned in the second letter, written to James at court in London. It tells us that James was under the patronage of Sir Robert Kerr of Ancram, and that his brothers John and Robert were in Sweden (presumably as soldiers) with Robert Leslie. John had kept up his learning, and sent Latin verse to his father. Nothing more is known of Robert and John, or their unspecified sister; the brothers are not mentioned in a bond of provision made by John of West Comrie on 5 May 1643 which names only Alexander, James and Samuel. (John and Robert have so far not turned up in any of the now much-scoured Scandinavian records of Scottish regiments, and would therefore appear to have died, possibly of disease, before they saw much or indeed any military service.) Elizabeth Melville’s letter of 1629 talks about the considerable financial difficulties in which the family finds itself. The lands of Kinnedar have had to be sold off outright, and those of Comrie sold under reversion, redeemable by her eldest son, Alexander, the purchaser in both cases being John Colville’s younger brother, Mr Robert, minister of Culross. Lady Culross indicates that Alexander Colville did not keep in frequent contact with her, and asks James to write to him about the redemption of the Comrie land.

=== Dr. Alexander Colville ===
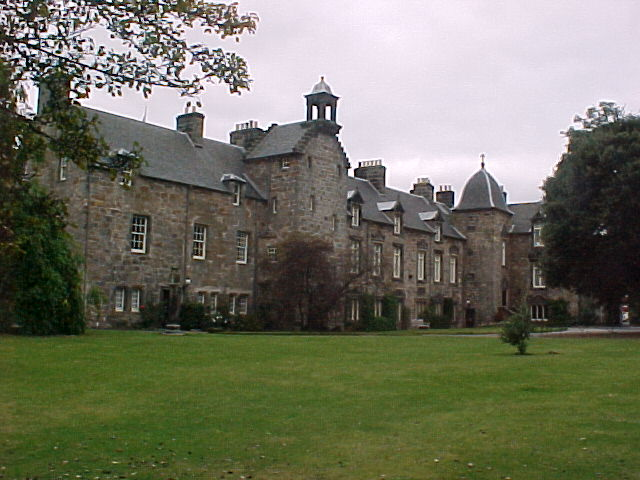
St Mary's College, St Andrews, at which Melville's son, Alexander, taught.

After studying at Edinburgh, in 1619 Alexander had moved to teach at the Protestant academy in Sedan in France, the home (since 1611) of the banished Scottish presbyterian spokesman Andrew Melville. There Alexander took his D.D. degree in 1628 and married the daughter of a French pastor in 1631. In 1641, the General Assembly asked him to return to teach at St. Andrews, which he did at a date as yet unclear. By 1649, he was professor of theology in St. Mary's College there, and would experience problems in the 1650s thanks to the antics of his disruptive youngest brother Samuel. During the Covenanting period, Dr. Alexander Colville seems to have been a generally respected moderate Covenanter, but at the Restoration, he conformed to episcopacy. He died in 1666. The descendants of his son John (d.1671), minister of Mid-Calder, would inherit the title of Lord Colville of Culross, on the extinction of the senior line in 1678. However, they did not use the title until Elizabeth Melville's great-great-grandson John successfully claimed it in 1723. The present Viscount Colville of Culross is his direct descendant.

In A Genealogical and Heraldic Dictionary of the Landed Gentry for 1853, vol.3, p. 71, Sir Bernard Burke misidentified Elizabeth Melville's son Dr Alexander as an Ulster planter and clergyman also named Dr Alexander Colville. The latter, almost certainly a scion of the Colvilles of Cleish, acquired a very considerable fortune and built Galgorm Castle near Ballymena, gaining a reputation for necromancy in the process. Burke's mistake has unfortunately given rise to erroneous statements in various publications and online genealogies.

=== Samuel Colville ===
In a letter of 1631 to John Livingstone, Elizabeth had commented that ‘Samuell is going to the colledge in Sant Andrews, to a worthy maister thair, bot I feare him deadly’, which indicates that her youngest child's behaviour had long been unpredictable. Three of Samuel's doggerel pasquils (from 1643, 1669 and 1673) survive in manuscript, attacking Clerk Register Sir Alexander Gibson, Bishop Gilbert Burnet and the Earl of Dundonald respectively. In 1681 Samuel published the first-known of numerous editions of his Mock Poem, or The Whiggs Supplication, which is sometimes described as the Scottish Hudibras. In 1673 he had published a large tome, The Grand Impostor Discovered: or, An Historical Dispute of the Papacy and Popish Religion, supposedly the first of two. No further parts ever appeared. It is not known when he died. It is highly probable that Samuel Colville, rather than James or Alexander, was the son referred to by Melville’s correspondent Samuel Rutherford when he wrote to her on 9 July 1637: ‘As for your son, who is your grief, your Lord waited on you and me, till we were ripe, and brought us in. It is your part to pray and wait upon him. When he is ripe, he will be spoken for. Who can command our Lord’s wind to blow? I know that it shall be your good in the latter end.’

=== Christian Colville ===
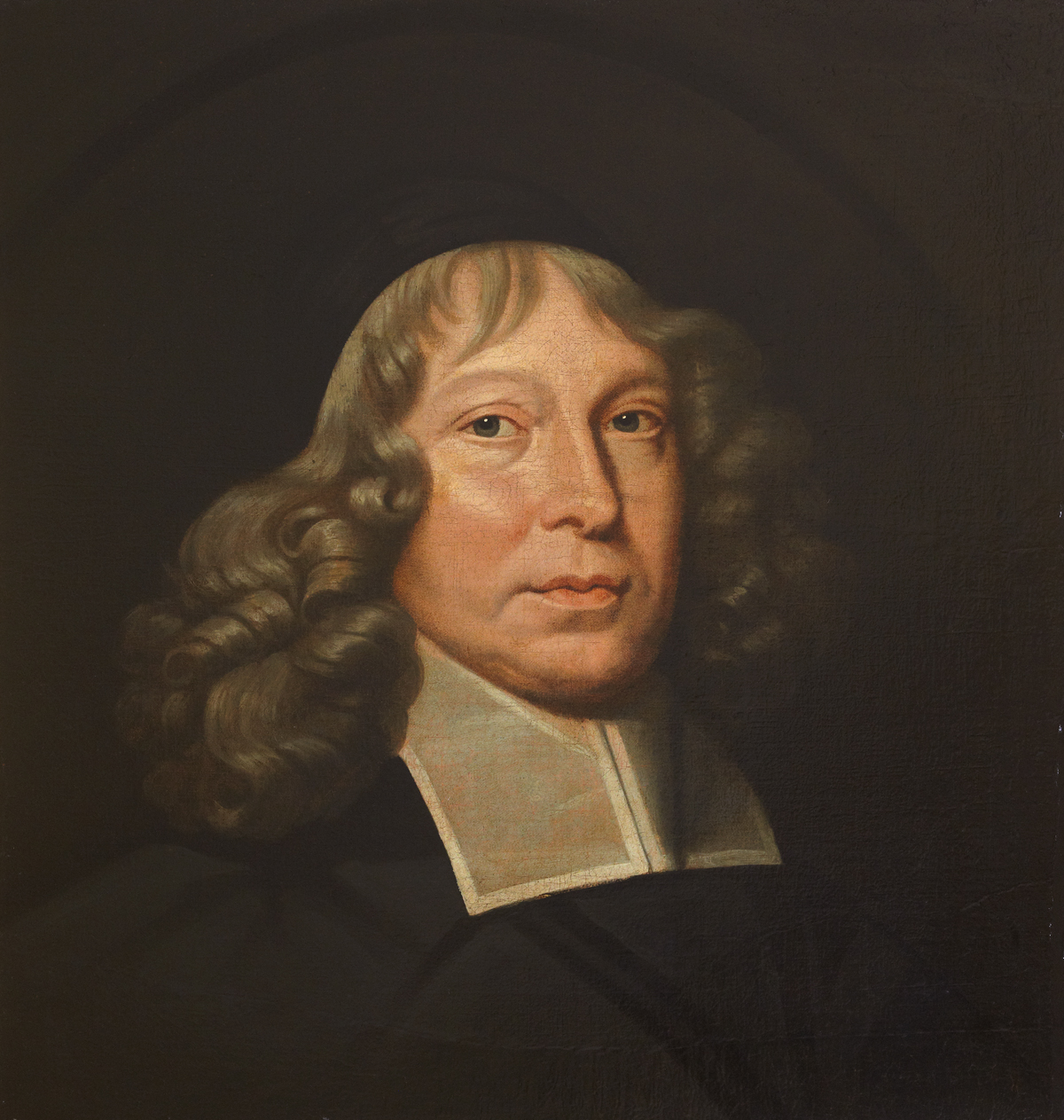
Pastor Samuel Rutherford (c.1600 – 1661).

The same letter of 9 July 1637 to Elizabeth Melville from the great presbyterian pastor Samuel Rutherford says ‘your son-in-law W.G. is truly honoured for his Lord and Master's cause ... his wife is his encourager, which should make you rejoice’. This refers to William Glendinning (or Glendoning) provost of Kirkcudbright, who in early spring 1637 had refused to imprison his father, Mr. Robert, the local minister. Mr. Robert had been suspended for nonconformity by Bishop Thomas Sydserf of Galloway, who subsequently ordered that Provost Glendinning and other local officials be imprisoned in Wigtown. William Glendinning was married to Christian Colville, named for her maternal grandmother Christian Boswell. The couple seem to have only one child, Elizabeth, presumably named for her maternal grandmother; her first husband was one George Glendinning, her second was John Maxwell, brother of the third Earl of Nithsdale, who died in the first half of 1658. Rutherford's extant letters to William Glendinning all conclude with special greetings to Glendinning's wife. At present, nothing further is known about Christian Colville, but Glendinning enjoyed some prominence in Covenanting Scotland, attending the Glasgow General Assembly that abolished the episcopate, and being one of the four Scottish commissioners sent to London to try to prevent the execution of Charles I.

== Melville's poetry ==
=== Printed poems ===
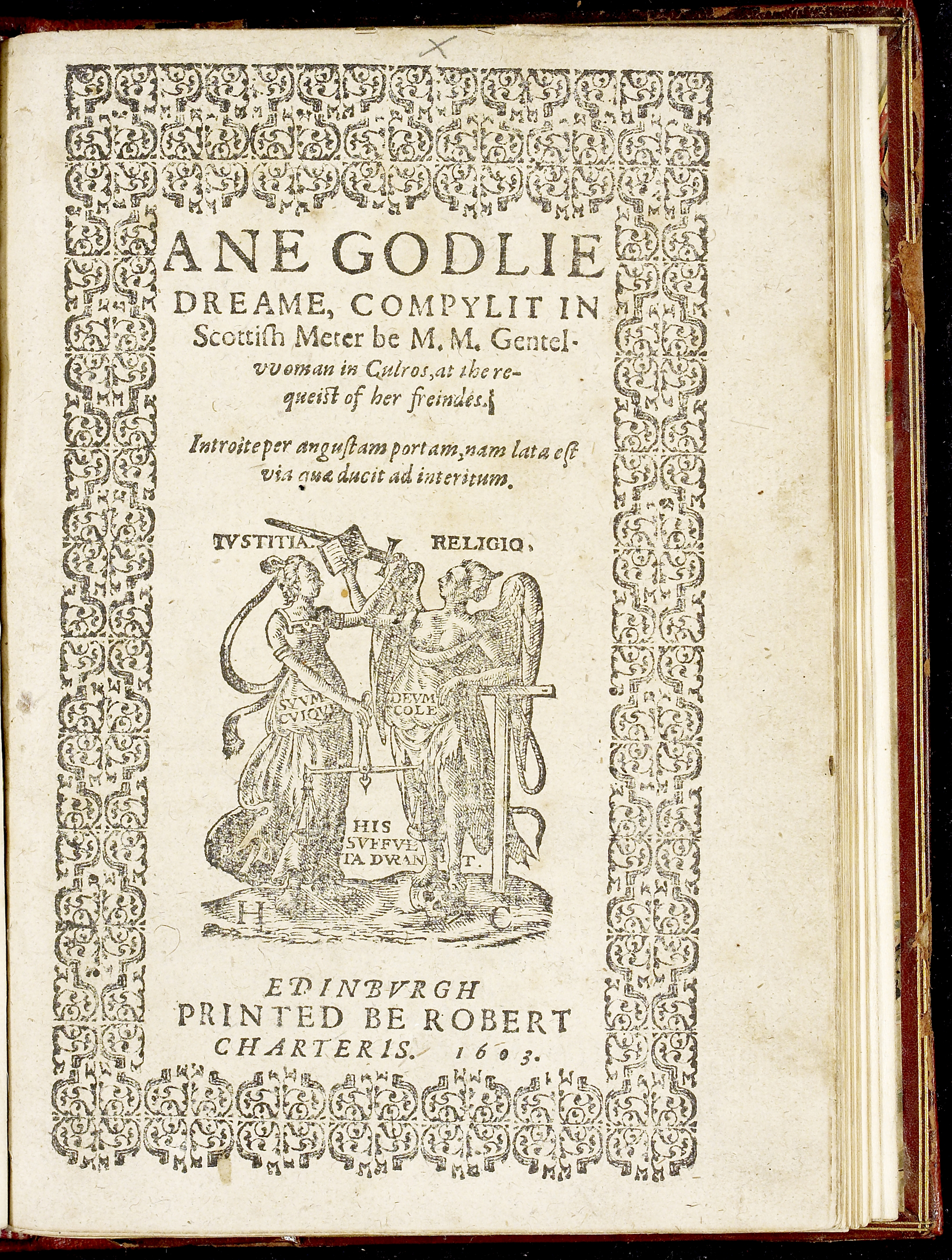
Ane godlie dreame, compylit in Scottish meter be M. M. gentelvvoman in Culros, at the requeist of her freindes, by Elizabeth Melville, Lady Culross. Title page. Published 1603 in Edinburgh by Robert Charteris. (Courtesy of National Library of Scotland.)

In 1599, the poet-pastor Alexander Hume dedicated his Hymnes, or Sacred Songs to ‘Lady Cumrie’, and in his prefatory address to her, he described her as ‘a Ladie, a tender youth, sad, solitare and sanctified’, adding ‘I knaw ye delyte in poesie yourselfe; and as I unconfeinedly confes, excelles any of your sex in that art, that ever I hard within this nation. I have seene your compositiones so copious, so pregnant, so spirituall, that I doubt not bot it is the gift of God in you’. In his essay ‘To the Scottish Youthe’ in the same volume, Hume set out his austere view that religious verse was the only poetry that Christians should read or write. Melville's poetry in many ways exemplifies Hume's prescriptions, though another minister, David Black, provides a perfect summary of the essence of Melville's work. In An Exposition vpon the thirtie two Psalme, describing the true maner of humbling and raysing vp of Gods children (1600), Black says that the psalm is a record of King David's ‘inwarde experience and observations of GOD his dealing with himselfe, which in the end of his labours and agonies, hee recompteth and committeth to writing’. Melville's writings are filled with echoes of the psalms, both of the Geneva Bible prose versions and those found in the Scottish metrical psalter of 1564 (by no means identical with the English Whole Booke of Psalmes of 1562). Much of her poetry was clearly born of her own personal spiritual struggles and her inward experience of God's dealings with her. In Ane Godlie Dreame, she made a narrative drama out of those struggles, and chose to share it with the world ‘at the requeist of her freindes’. The poem is cast in 60 eight-line ‘ballat royal’ stanzas (rhyming ababbcbc), and features dialogue between the narrator and Christ, effective descriptive passages, theological writing and homiletic exhortation; the last third of the poem reviews what has gone before, in an ‘application’ of its message, such as would have been found in a sermon of the time.

The 1603 print is presented in Scots orthography. In the next, undated edition, probably from 1604, the text has been transcribed into a form of English orthography, with some small textual changes, and the publication is now stated to have been ‘at the request of a friend’. All successive editions (thirteen are known of in all, down to 1737) followed this text. The success of the Dreame was such that Charteris issued a third edition in 1606. In these editions, and in Andro Hart's edition of 1620, the Dreame was followed by a ‘comfortable song’ in five stanzas, beginning ‘Away vaine warld’, long mis-attributed to the great court-poet Alexander Montgomerie (d.1598). It is a ‘sacred parody’ of the extremely successful English love-song, ‘Shall I let her goe’ published by Robert Jones in 1600 and quoted by Shakespeare in Twelfth Night. In Raban's 1644 Aberdeen print of the Dreame, ‘Away vaine world’ was joined by ‘Come sweet Lord, my sorrow ceas’, a Scots-language sacred parody of another English love-song. Militantly anti-Catholic, this is presumably a work of Elizabeth Melville's that had circulated in manuscript. In later editions of the Dreame, it replaces ‘Away vaine world’. A three-stanza text of ‘Away vaine warld’ was, however, included in a later Aberdeen publication, John Forbes’s Songs and Fancies (1662, 1666 and 1682), as song no. 35. Like all the book’s song texts, it is unattributed. Forbes’s error-strewn text cannot have been copied from the text printed eighteen years earlier at Aberdeen in Raban’s Godly Dream.

=== Manuscript poems ===
As far as is currently known, no other work by Melville appeared in print. The two comminatory ‘rhyme royal’ stanzas inscribed on the outer wall of the Melville mausoleum in Collessie kirkyard, built by Sir James of Halhill for his wife in 1609, are presumably the work of his poet daughter. Manuscript survivals of individual poems (three sonnets, a sacred parody of Marlowe's ‘Come live with me’ and the large-scale ‘Loves Lament for Christ's Absence’) indicate that handwritten copies of some of her works were in circulation. The major survival, however, is what seems to be a consciously ordered sequence of sixteen poems and three short sonnet-sequences. Totalling c.3,000 lines, these are found at the end of a beautifully copied manuscript volume of twenty-nine sermons on Hebrews 11, preached in 1590–91 by Robert Bruce, minister of Edinburgh. The overlap in lexis, phraseology, style and content with Ane Godlie Dreame and ‘Away vaine warld’ (and with the four manuscript poems bearing Melville's name) led to their being attributed to Melville by Jamie Reid-Baxter in 2002; for the same reasons, he also attributed the anonymous manuscript poem ‘Loves Lament for Christ's Absence’ to her that same year.

A distinctive stylistic marker is Melville’s use of a ‘chiming’ internal rhyme before the caesura in both lines of the closing couplet of her three scribally-assigned sonnets. The acrostic sonnet to the imprisoned minister John Welsh ends:

A sight most bright thy soul shall shortly see
When store of Glore thy rich reward shall be.

The acrostic (and anagram) sonnet to the imprisoned Andrew Melville ends:

Now saulls do schyne quho luik unto thy licht
And wel wer myne to sie that blissed sicht.

and the accompanying sonnet also addressed to him ends:

Rejoyce and sing thoch Sathan sift thee soir
Fecht for thy king and gaine ane crowne of glor.

This striking device is also employed in some of the Bruce Manuscript sonnets. It is also found in sonnets by four ministers of the presbytery of St Andrews. The last line of ‘A Sonnet sent to Blackness to Mr John Welsh, by the Lady Culross’, recorded in the idiosyncratic cursive hand of the presbyterian historian Rev. Robert Wodrow (1679–1734), has been repeatedly mistranscribed, despite the existence of the correct transcription printed by the Scottish manuscript scholar David Laing in 1826 and reprinted in 1895.

== Melville's Letters ==
Edinburgh University Library’s Laing Collection holds a bound volume of eleven holograph letters by Elizabeth Melville, and a transcript of a twelfth. One letter dates from August 1625, the other eleven were written between January 1629 and June 1632. They represent no more than a tiny fragment of what must have been a vast correspondence, but they constitute an invaluable source of biographical information about the poet. The most informative are the two that Melville addressed to her son James in 1625 and 1629, already discussed. These two are also the only letters to have been edited, but only one of the nine holograph letters (to the Countess of Wigton, Margaret Livingston) remains unpublished. Despite its addressee, it forms an integral part of the existing group of nine letters Melville wrote to the young minister John Livingstone between June 1629 and June 1632. Livingstone’s own autobiographical writings are, with the letters, the major source of information about Melville’s biography.

In 1845, Livingstone’s autobiography and the heterogeneous observations he entitled ‘Memorable Characteristics and Remarkable Passages of Divine Providence’ were published by W.K.Tweedie. Tweedie also included the texts of the eight holograph letters addressed to Livingstone by Elizabeth Melville, explaining that these had been transcribed by their original collector, the antiquary Charles Kirkpatrick Sharpe. Tweedie does not mention that in 1817, Sharpe had printed a ninth letter from Melville to Livingstone, prefacing it with the observation that, like Samuel Rutherford, John Livingstone ‘carried on an epistolary correspondence with all the distinguished female enthusiasts in Scotland, and I have seen many letters … expressing wonderful attachment to his person, as well as to the covenanted cause. As a specimen of the style in which these she-saints wrote, a letter of Lady Culross, much more brief than the generality of her religious rhapsodies, is subjoined, from the original MS.’. The letter in question is found only as a 19th century transcript in the bound volume in Edinburgh University Library. As printed by Tweedie, Sharpe’s transcription of the eight other letters is apparently not entirely accurate. Tweedie wrote that ‘It is difficult to fix the dates of the different letters with precision’, but their contents show that the order in which he printed them is not chronological. A list providing an apparently more accurate ordering was published in 2015, whereby the first-written would be Tweedie’s no III, followed by nos. VIII, I, II and then nos. IV to VII. In this ordering, the letter printed by Sharpe in 1817 would come between III and VII, i.e. second in the complete chronological series, while the unprinted holograph letter to the Countess of Wigton would come between nos. II and IV.

The extant letters are, like Melville’s poetry, are full of Biblical quotations and allusions, but contain no verse. The two to her son James are ‘more solicitous than imperious’, while those to Livingstone are ‘often imperious (as well as querulous and self-deprecatingly humorous)’; Melville writes like ‘a “mother in God”, lecturing Livingstone, counselling him, scolding him and even suggesting subject matter for sermons’. Having trained for the ministry in order to follow in his father’s footsteps, Livingstone found his path to a Scottish parish blocked by the episcopal hierarchy on account of his adherence to presbyterianism, and for several years he preached wherever he was welcome as a guest, including in Fife. In his writings, Livingstone speaks with gratitude of the protection and support he was afforded by a number of ladies of the landowning classes, but he ‘has more to say of Elizabeth Melville than of any of the much grander grandes dames to whom he was beholden’. Melville’s letters to him make references to persons and places that demonstrate the extent to which she was part of the nationwide Scottish network of presbyterians practising passive resistance to Crown policy with regard to worship and Kirk governance. Apart from her correspondence, other sources give clues to her network and contacts, in December 1609 Alexander Hume, minister of Logie, linked "elder Lady Elizabeth Melville, Lady Comrie" with Marie Stewart, Countess of Mar in his will, wishing them both "love, Christian affection, and blessing". Robert Wodrow was told that she had visited Anne Livingstone at Eglinton Castle in 1622, meeting the minister David Dickson.

== Modern interest in Melville ==
=== Interest within the universities ===
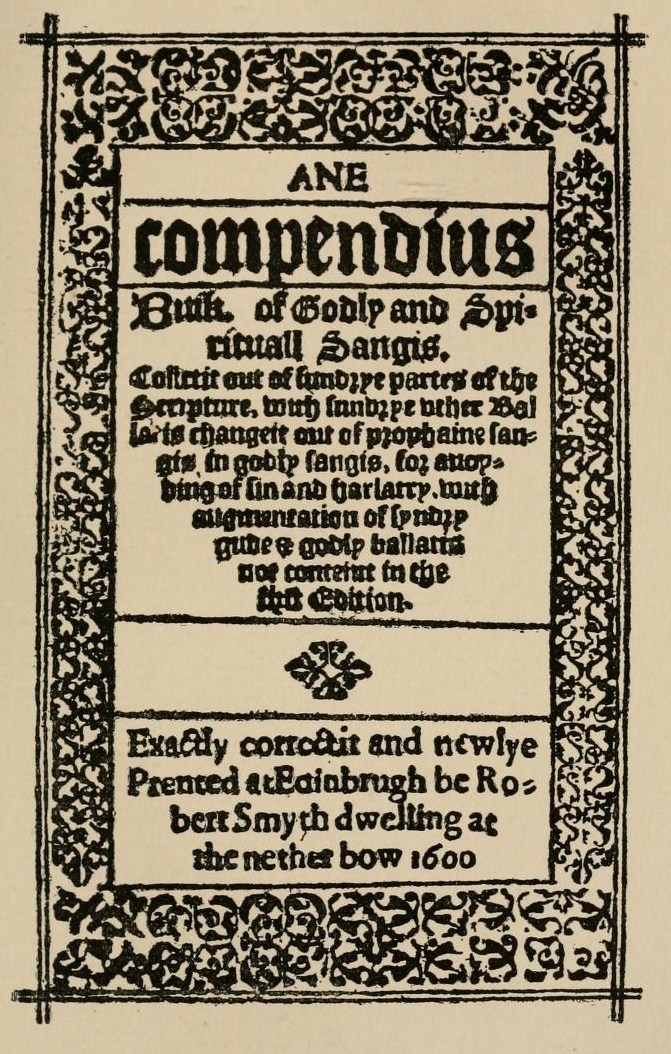
1600 Edinburgh imprint of the anonymous Gude and Godlie Ballatis, one of Melville's first-hand literary influences.

Modern scholarship on Melville dates back to David Laing's 1826 reprint of the 1603 text of Ane Godlie Dreame in Scottish Metrical Tales, reissued by Carew Hazlitt in 1895 as Early Popular Poetry of Scotland. Laing's enthusiastic introduction to the Dreame included Melville's acrostic sonnet of 1606 or 1607 to the imprisoned minister John Welsh (the acrostic reads M Jhone Welshe), which had survived in non-contemporary copies in the Wodrow Manuscripts (now held by the National Library of Scotland). Laing omitted ‘Away vaine warld’, however, since he discovered a version of the text in the Margaret Kerr Manuscript of the poems of Alexander Montgomerie, whose date of death was completely unknown until the 1970s. Laing assumed that a poem of such quality must be the work of James VI's ‘maister makar’, and had been appropriated by Melville's printer as a make-weight. Paratextual studies are a very recent development, and Laing was not alone amongst 19th-century editors of older printed work in omitting liminary verse as irrelevant. It is nonetheless curious that Laing failed to notice how closely this short lyric relates to the major theme of the Dreame, namely the spiritual bliss afforded in this earthly life by a truly unconditional love for Christ and complete trust in Him as guide and in the strength of His hand to protect and save. In his Scottish Text Society edition of the works of Melville's friend Alexander Hume (Edinburgh, 1902), Alexander Lawson included both the Dreame and ‘Away vaine warld’ in an appendix.

However, Melville really began to register with contemporary scholarship only with Germaine Greer's inclusion and discussion of her work in the epoch-making Kissing the Rod: An Anthology of 17th-Century Women's Verse (1988). In 1991, An Anthology of Scottish Women's Verse, edited by the Scottish-Canadian Catherine Kerrigan, likewise reproduced some stanzas from Ane Godlie Dreame and Melville's sonnet to John Welsh. Since then, Melville's name and poetry have been regularly mentioned and discussed in scholarly work on Early Modern Women. Academic interest in and writing about Melville continues to grow, though she is often treated as an ‘early modern Englishwoman’, and hence sometimes even referred to as ‘Elizabeth Colville’. Sarah Dunnigan, Rebecca Laroche, Sarah Ross and Jamie Reid-Baxter have attempted to place Melville firmly in her Scottish context, whether historical, ecclesiastical or literary.

Still unexplored is the extent of her familiarity with French literature, though there are clear parallels to be drawn with the poetry of Marguérite de Navarre. Her own father's French connections ran very deep. But Scotland's intimate links with France, by virtue of the 'Auld Alliance', meant that after the Reformation, great numbers of Scots continued to study and teach there, not least in the various French Protestant academies. Her friend Alexander Hume spent several years studying in France, and her own son Alexander would make a large part of his career there. That Melville was aware of English literary developments, read the publications of Tudor puritan divines, and had an encyclopaedic familiarity with the Geneva Bible and its marginalia is not in dispute, but in literary terms, her work relates most immediately to the productions of her Scottish contemporaries Alexander Hume, James Melville and Alexander Montgomerie, and behind them, the presence of Sir David Lindsay's Dreme (c.1526; published 1574) and his huge Dialogue betuix Experience and ane Courteour, Off the miserabill estait of the world (Paris, 1558, Scottish reissue 1574), as well as the anonymous Gude and Godlie Ballatis (1565 and several later editions). Elizabeth Melville's language, her use of complex rhyme-schemes and alliteration, and of the Scottish interlacing sonnet form (ababbcbccdcdee) all belong to her native poetic tradition. Like Robert Henryson's Orpheus, David Lindsay's narrator travels to hell in both the Dreme and Ane Dialogue betuix Experience and ane Courteour. The Scottish dream-vision tradition was still lively in the 1590s, with James Melville, John Burel and Montgomerie all publishing substantial, if very different, dream-vision poems between 1590 and 1597. For the growing academic interest in Melville, see Bibliography below.

=== Interest outwith the universities ===
There is no monument of any kind to Lady Culross in the historic village of Culross, where she worshipped throughout her adult life in the Abbey kirk, under the ministry of her brother-in-law and her brother. Popular books expressive of nineteenth-century presbyterian piety, which venerated the spirit of the National Covenant of 1638, noted Melville's existence as a friend of John Welsh, John Livingstone and Samuel Rutherford, though there was no popular reprint of Ane Godlie Dreame to parallel the multiple editions of Rutherford's Letters. Melville was occasionally mentioned in popular histories of Scottish vernacular literature, but her work does not seem to have been included in any of the many popular anthologies of Scottish poetry which were produced right through the 19th and 20th centuries, nor does she appear in the New Penguin Book of Scottish Verse (2002).

However, following Jamie Reid-Baxter's recovery of the manuscript poetry, there were two public concert presentations of Melville's life and work: 3 April 2004 in Culross Abbey, and 26 June 2005 in Innerpeffray Collegiate Kirk. In 2010, Melville's songs were included in three concerts (in Culross, Dundee and Dunfermline) marking the 450th anniversary of the Scottish Reformation. Poems of Elizabeth Melville, Lady Culross was launched at the first of these, in Culross Abbey on 17 April 2010. The inscribed flagstone in Makars' Court in Edinburgh commemorating Melville is a public statement, and the quotation chosen highlights Melville's continuing relevance to modern life as a woman who resisted tyranny. Its unveiling by Germaine Greer on 21 June 2014 formed part of ‘Elizabeth Melville Day’, a series of public events culminating in a choral concert featuring all five of Melville's lyrics for which music is extant.

== Reading Melville ==
Melville's Geneva-Bible-based lexicon largely eschews specifically Scots items of vocabulary, and thus poses few problems for a non-Scotophone reader. The sound of Melville's language, however, is that of her native late 16th-century Fifeshire Scots, and her artistry and technical skill are all the more apparent when her work is pronounced as Scots. This is no easy task in view of the vagaries and often very anglicised spelling of her scribes and printers; by 1603, when Ane Godlie Dreame was first printed, the traditional Scots system orthography had long started to break down under the impact of imports of English printed books. Melville's lines also need to be correctly scanned: she did not write unmetrical doggerel. In her verse, the standard Middle Scots written termination "-is" (marking plural nouns or the 3rd person singular) is almost never to be given syllabic value; the same often applies to the past participle ending ‘-it’, while – as so often in Middle Scots – intervocalic "v" is very frequently elided (cf. ‘Hallowe'en’ and ‘o’er’). Like all the vernacular poetry of late 16th- and early 17th-century Scotland, Melville's work uses much alliteration, and so "k" in words beginning "kn", and "w" (pronounced as "v") in words beginning "wr" should be voiced, e.g. ‘vretchit’ for written ‘wretchit’. The guttural consonant "ch" should always be given its proper value, even if spelled "gh” and the sound represented by ‘ow’ in words like ‘downe’ and ‘crowne’, or by ‘ou’ in words like ‘out’ and ‘about’, is ‘oo’, as in modern spoken Scots.) As her rhyme-schemes show, in Melville's Fife-Angus dialect, words like "peace", "cease", or "heid" and "deid" were pronounced as "pace, sayss, hayd, dayd" (cf. modern Ulster pronunciation). Like other Scots poets, Melville makes occasional use of ‘southern’ pronunciation of certain sounds for the purposes of rhyme; for example, when written "moir/more" is rhymed with "gloir" or "befoir" it is not pronounced as "mair". The richer the Scots in which Melville's lines are read, and the more accurately they are scanned, the greater their musicality. In her song lyrics, the lines are well shaped to the melodies she chose, and when sung, these poems are deeply affecting. The impact of Melville's work in general is greatly heightened by being heard: Ane Godlie Dreame proved to be an effective performance piece at the Elizabeth Melville Day Symposium on 21 June 2014. Also suitable for performance by two voices is the lengthy penultimate poem in the Bruce Manuscript, a dialogue between the soul of someone in great spiritual distress – perhaps even dying? – and a soberly consoling spiritual counsellor.

== Melville's legacy ==
John Livingstone’s notes on the "Memorable Characteristics" of his contemporaries contain several references to Elizabeth Melville, which testify to the extent of her influence on her correligionists. These individuals included the versifying presbyterian minister of Irvine on the Ayrshire coast, David Dickson, whom she singled out to lead the prayers of a despondent company of dissident ministers and other presbyterians on 4 August 1621 after the Scottish Parliament had ratified the episcopalian Five Articles of Perth. Dickson’s much-reprinted long poem, True Christian Love, to be sung with the common tunes of the psalms, first published in 1634, is reminiscent of Melville’s work. Dickson also wrote an acrostic poem (on his own name, in three ababacc stanzas), reminiscent of Melville’s acrostic spiritual sonnets. She is known to have been in correspondence with Dickson. It has been suggested that Melville’s poetry also influenced another apparently presbyterian poet from Ayrshire, Francis Hamilton of Silvertonhill. It is probable that Ane Godlie Dreame was known to the militantly presbyterian Sir William Mure of Rowallan, also from Ayrshire. In particular, his sonnet-sequence The Joy of Teares (published in 1635) contains many lines and images strongly reminiscent of Melville’s poetry deploring the persecution of the faithful. But Melville’s legacy is much more extensive, insofar as the very long shelf-life of Ane Godlie Dreame must have influenced the spirituality of several generations of pious Scottish presbyterians. With the unveiling of the commemorative flagstone in Makars' Court, and the considerable publicity which surrounded that event, she has become a flagship for the revaluation of the writings of Scottish women of earlier centuries: the other six women commemorated there all published after 1900.

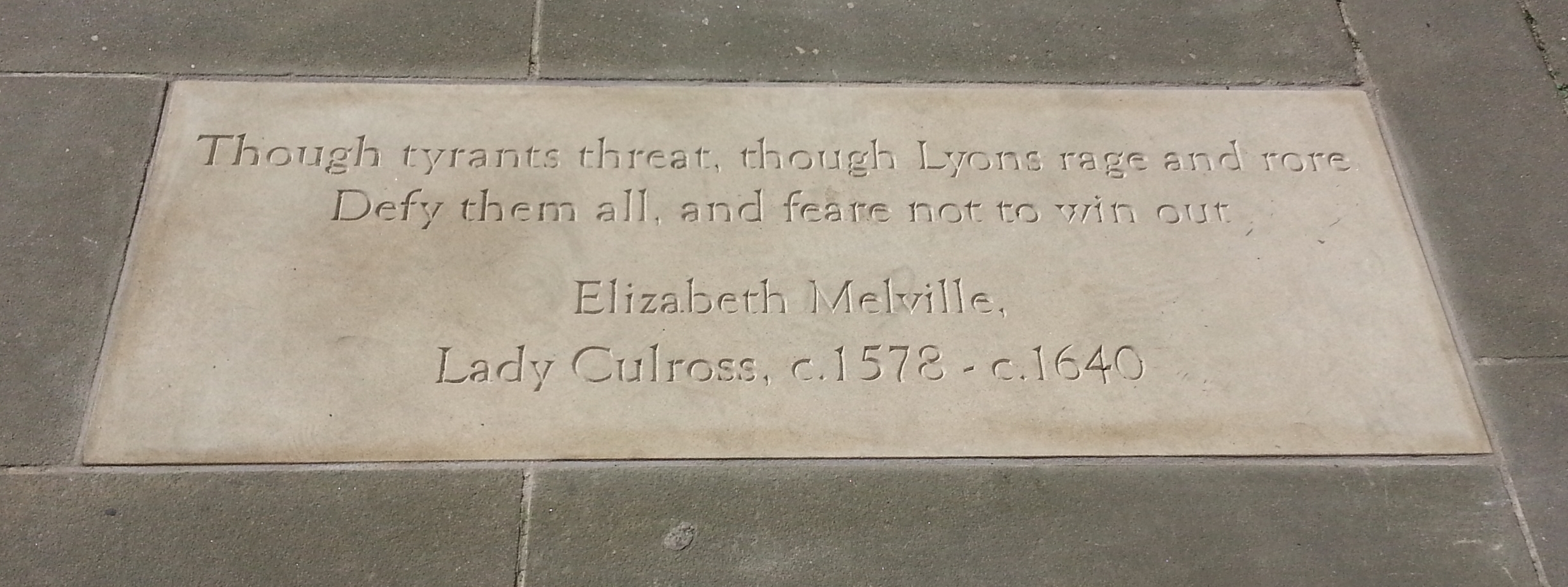
Flagstone commemorating Elizabeth Melville, Lady Culross (c1578-c1640), in Makars' Court, Lawnmarket, Edinburgh, Scotland. Unveiled by Germaine Greer on 21 June 2014. The inscription is taken from the 1606 edition of Melville's poem, Ane Godlie Dreame, which was first published in Edinburgh in 1603: "Though tyrants threat, though Lyons rage and rore Defy them all, and feare not to win out"

== Bibliography ==
- Ane Godlie Dreame. Edinburgh: R. Charteris. 1603
- A Godly Dreame. Edinburgh: R. Charteris. ?1604
- A Godlie Dreame. Edinburgh: R.Charteris. 1606
- A Godlie Dreame. Edinburgh: Andrew Hart. 1620
- A Godly Dream. Aberdeen: Raban, 1644.
- A Godly Dream. Edinburgh: Heirs of A. Anderson, 1680. H.G. Aldis, A List of Books printed in Scotland before 1701, no. 2206. No copies currently known.
- A Godly Dream. [Glasgow: R. Sanders?], 1686. Aldis, no. 2645.5. Copy in National Library of Scotland.
- A Godly Dream. Edinburgh, 1692. Aldis, no. 3233. No copies currently known.
- A Godly Dream. Edinburgh, 169[8?]. Aldis, no. 3761. Copy in National Library of Scotland.
- A Godly Dream. Glasgow: printed by Robert Sanders, 1698. [16 p.] Aldis, no. 3762. Copy in National Library of Scotland.
- A Godly Dream. [Edinburgh?], 1718. ESTC T16266. Copy in British Library.
- A Godly Dream. Glasgow: Robert Sanders, 1727. Copy in Thomas Fisher Rare Book Library, University of Toronto.
- A Godly Dream. 1737. Listed in Early Metrical Tales, ed. David Laing. (Edinburgh: W. D. Laing/ London: J. Duncan, 1826), p. xxxvi. No Copy currently known.
- 'A Sonnet Sent to Blackness.' In Early Metrical Tales, ed. David Laing. (Edinburgh: W. D. Laing/ London: J. Duncan. 1826), p. xxxii.
- 'Letters from Lady Culross, Etc.' Select Biographies. Ed. W. K. Tweedie. 2 vols (Edinburgh: Wodrow Society, 1845), I, 349-70.
- Poems of Elizabeth Melville, Lady Culross. Ed. Jamie Reid Baxter. Edinburgh: Solsequium, 2010.
- James Anderson, ‘Lady Culross’ in The Ladies of the Covenant (Glasgow, 1862), pp. 31–38.
- Sarah Dunnigan, ‘Sacred Afterlives: Mary, Queen of Scots, Elizabeth Melville and the Politics of Sanctity’ in Women's Writing, vol. 10 (2003), pp. 401–424.
- Sarah Dunnigan, 'Elizabeth Melville (fl.1603)' in D. Gifford and D. MacMillan, eds, A History of Scottish Women's Writing (Edinburgh University Press, 1997), pp. 31–34.
- Deanna Evans, 'Elizabeth Melville' in The Literary Encyclopedia. Ed. Robert Clark, Emory Elliott and Janet Todd.
- Deanna Delmar Evans, ‘Holy Terror and Love Divine: The Passionate Voice in Elizabeth Melville's Ane Godlie Dreame’ in Sarah Dunnigan et al (eds.) Woman and the Feminine in Medieval and Early Modern Scottish Writing (New York and London: Palgrave, 2004), pp. 153–161.
- Germaine Greer, Introduction to Germaine Greer et al (eds.) Kissing the Rod: An Anthology 17th-Century Women's Verse (London: Virago, 1988), pp. 31–38.
- Karen Rae Keck, ‘Elizabeth Melville's Ane Godlie Dreame: A Critical Edition’, PhD thesis, Texas Tech University, 2006.
- Rebecca Laroche, 'Elizabeth Melville and Her Friends: Seeing Ane Godlie Dreame through Political Lenses.' CLIO 34.3 (Spring 2005): 277(19).
- Femke Molekamp, Women and the Bible in Early Modern England (Oxford University Press, 2013); Melville is discussed in Chapter 4 ‘Women and Affective Religious Reading and Writing’.
- Jamie Reid-Baxter, 'The Apocalyptic Muse of Francis Hamilton of Silvertonhill (c.1585–1645)', in Journal of the Northern Renaissance vol. IV (2012), numbered paragraph 32.
- Jamie Reid-Baxter, ‘Elizabeth Melville, Lady Culross: new light from Fife’, in The Innes Review, 68.1 (2017), pp. 38–77.
- Jamie Reid-Baxter, ‘ Defy them all, and feare not to win out: Elizabeth Melville, Scotland’s first woman in print’, in iScot Magazine, March 2017.
- Jamie Reid-Baxter, 'Elizabeth Melville, Lady Culross: Two Letters to her Son James', in E Ewan and J Nugent (eds.) Children and Youth in Medieval and Early Modern Scotland (Martlesham: Boydell and Brewer, 2015), pp. 205–19.
- Jamie Reid-Baxter, 'The "Real" Dr Alexander Colville of Galgorm', in Familia no. 30 (2014), pp. 57–76, Ulster Historical Foundation.
- Jamie Reid-Baxter, ‘Elizabeth Melville, Calvinism and the Lyric Voice’, in D. J. Parkinson, eds. Tides of Change: Scottish Literature under James VI and I (Leiden: Brill, 2013), pp. 151–171.
- Jamie Reid-Baxter, ‘Elizabeth Melville, Lady Culross (c.1570–1640)’ entry in The Biographical Dictionary of Scottish Women (Edinburgh University Press, 2006).
- Jamie Reid-Baxter,‘Elizabeth Melville's Letters in Edinburgh University Library, Laing III.347’ in Notes and Queries, (Oxford University Press), December 2006, pp. 525–528.
- Jamie Reid-Baxter, 'The Songs of Lady Culross' in G. M. Hair, M MacKay and G. J. Munro (eds.) Notis Musycall: Essays on Music and Scottish Culture presented to Kenneth Elliott at 75 (Glasgow: Musica Scotica Trust, 2005), pp. 143–163.
- Jamie Reid-Baxter, 'Presbytery, Politics and Poetry: Maister Robert Bruce, John Burel and Elizabeth Melville, Lady Culross', in RSCHS (Records of the Scottish Church History Society) vol. xxxiv (2004), pp. 6–27.
- Jamie Reid-Baxter, 'Elizabeth Melville, Lady Culross: 3500 New Lines of Verse' in S. Dunnigan et al (eds.) Woman and the Feminine in Medieval and Early Modern Scottish Writing (New York and London: Palgrave, 2004), pp. 195–200.
- Jamie Reid-Baxter and Sarah Ross, 'Elizabeth Melville, Lady Culross' entry in Encyclopedia of English Renaissance Literature (Wiley-Blackwell, 2012).
- Sarah C. Ross 'Peripatetic Poems: Sites of Production and Routes of Exchange in Elizabeth Melville's Scotland', Women's Writing, 26:1, (2019), pp. 53–70.
- Sarah C. Ross 'Elizabeth Melville's Religious Poetry', chapter 1 of Sarah C. Ross, Women, Poetry and Politics in Seventeenth Century Britain (Oxford University Press, 2015), pp. 26–62.
- Sarah C. Ross ‘Elizabeth Melville’, entry in the Early Modern Women’s Research Network
- Sarah C. Ross, 'Elizabeth Melville and the Religious Sonnet Sequence in England and Scotland', in Susan J. Wiseman (ed.), Early Modern Women and the Poem (Manchester University Press, 2014).
- Sarah C. Ross, '"Give me thy hairt and I desyre no more": The Song of Songs, Petrarchism and Elizabeth Melville's Puritan Poetics’, in Johanna Harris and Elizabeth Scott-Baumann (eds), The Intellectual Culture of Puritan Women (Basingstoke: Palgrave Macmillan, 2011), pp. 96–107.
- Jeremy J. Smith, Older Scots : A Linguistic Reader (Woodbridge: Scottish Text Society, 2012).
- Carolyn R. Swift, 'Elizabeth Melville'. Literary Resource Center. Thomson Gale. 2 February 2007.
