= Andro Hart =

Scottish printer (died 1621)

Andro Hart (died December 1621), or Andrew Hart, was a Scottish printer, publisher, and bookseller in Edinburgh.

== Biography ==
Andro Hart was a printer, publisher and bookseller in the city of Edinburgh, Scotland who flourished during the late 16th century and early 17th century. He established his business sometime in the late 1580s; initially working solely as a bookseller. His first wife, Janet Micklehill (died 1604), played an instrumental role in the early years of this business and along with her husband became a major force in Edinburgh's book trade. The couple had one son, Samuel, who also participated in the family business when he came of age. There were also several daughters.

By 1589 at the latest Andro was an importer of foreign books. A document to Edinburgh's privy council indicates that he and Englishman John Norton imported books from Germany, possibly as early as 1857, and that they were selling these books not only in Edinburgh but also in London and other parts of England. This document related a complaint to the council which successfully led to the abandonment of a new duty on imported books in 1859. Hart's book business initially occupied a shop on the north side of the High Street, opposite the mercat cross at the head of Craig's Close. He later acquired another site for his printing-house which was located further down the close on the same side of the street. His printing business was in operation by 1607, and in 1610 he acquired the printing plant of publisher Robert Charteris.

Hart was joined in his business efforts by his family which dominated the book trade in Edinburgh in the late 16th century and first half of the 17th century. After the death of first wife, he married two more times. His third wife, Jonet Kene, also became heavily involved in the running of the family's book business. They maintained an influential place through a series of alliances established through marriages and business dealings which enabled them to influence the retail, importing, and printing side of the book business in that city. Andro and Jonet had two sons who joined the family trade, John and Andrew.

Hart published a much admired edition of the Bible in 1610. It was the second domestically produced edition of the Geneva Bible. In 1615 he published an influential psalter which included within it the first collection of Scottish "Common Tunes that served as a foundation for the Hymnbooks of the Church of Scotland. He was also celebrated for his printing of John Barbour's The Brus; a work he published in 1616 and 1620 editions. He also published books on theology and mathematics among other topics.

Hart served as the publisher for contemporary writers, Sir William Alexander and of William Drummond of Hawthornden. He also published editions of Blind Harry's The Wallace (1611, 1618 & 1620), John Rolland's Seven Sages (1620), Elizabeth Melville's Ane Godlie Dreame (1620), and Alexander Montgomerie's The Flyting Betwixt Montgomery and Polwart (1621). He was contacted by Michael Drayton in a letter dated 9 November 1618 with the hopes of arranging the publication of the last part of his topographical poem Poly-Olbion, but the negotiations never came to fruition.

Andro Hart died in Edinburgh in December 1621. In his will, he enjoined 'Samvell, my eldest sone, to … instruct John and Androw Hartes, his breither, if at Godis plesowr they cum to perfyt zeires, in my tred and vocatioun of buikis selling'. His second wife, Jonet, assumed control of Andro's press and continued to operate it with the assistance of her sons until her death in May 1642. She published using the imprint "Heires of Andro Hart". Her output included several influential publications of Scottish church music, including a 1635 psalter consisting of 143 psalm settings by mainly Scottish composers.

The Hart family's original bookshop was later occupied by stores owned by William Creech and Archibald Constable.
