= Culross Abbey =

Monastery in Fife, Scotland

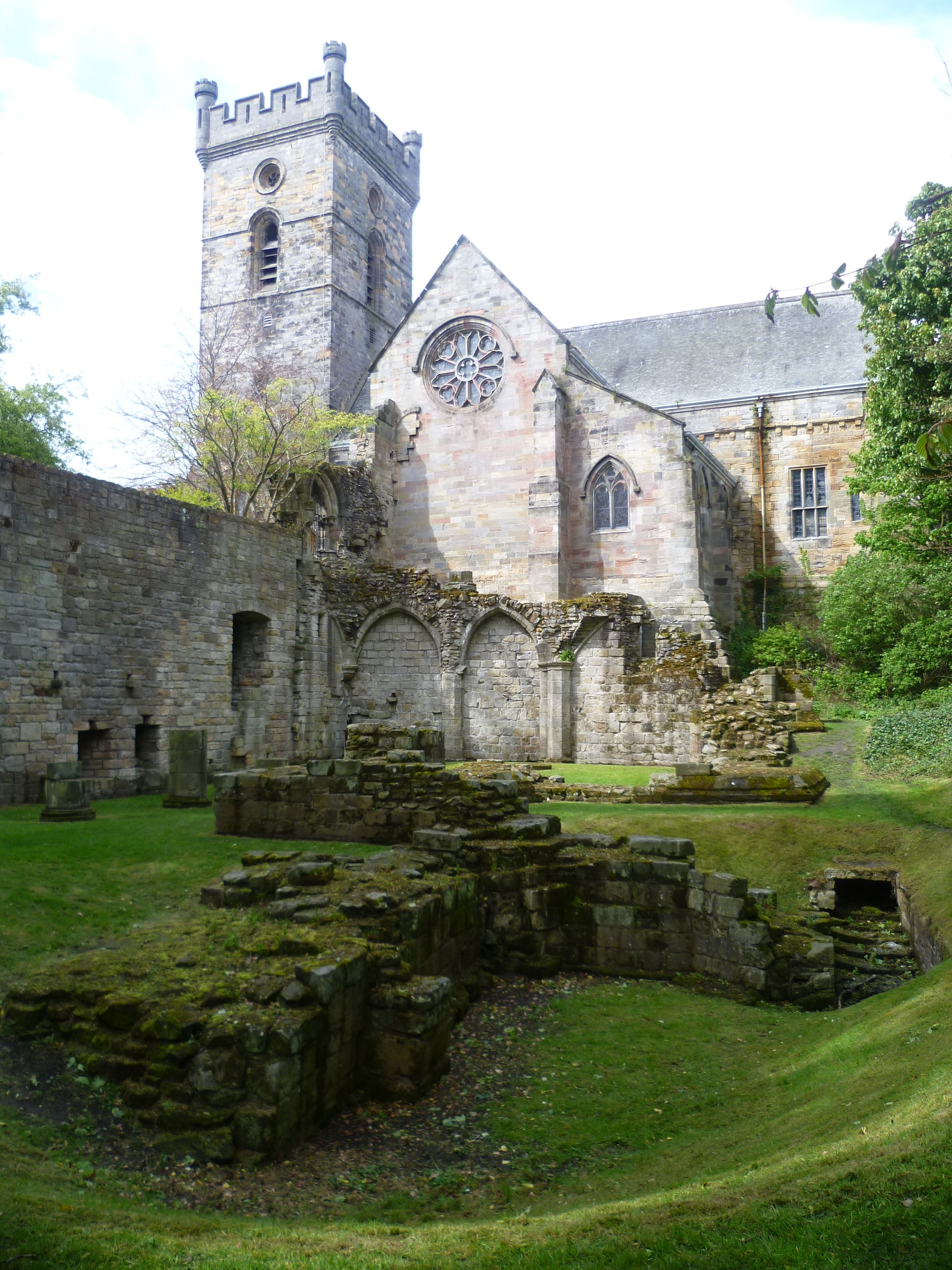
- Culross Abbey in 2012
- Interactive map of Culross Abbey

Monastery information
- Order: Cistercian
- Established: 1217
- Disestablished: 1589
- Mother house: Kinloss Abbey
- Diocese: Diocese of St Andrews
- Controlled churches: Crombie; Culross; Tullibole

People
- Founder: Maol Choluim I, Earl of Fife

Site
- Coordinates: 56.05811°N 3.62551°W

Scheduled monument
- Official name: Culross Abbey
- Designated: 13 December 2013
- Reference no.: SM13334

Culross Abbey is a former Cistercian abbey in Culross, Scotland, headed by the Abbot or Commendator of Culross.

== History ==
The abbey was founded in 1217 by Malcolm I, Mormaer or Earl of Fife, and was first colonised by monks from Kinloss Abbey. Culross may have been chosen to establish an abbey because this was the birthplace of Saint Mungo. It is evident that the abbey was built over the earlier Pictish church supposedly founded by Saint Serf in the 6th century, as witnessed by the presence in the ruined Cistercian church of early medieval carved stones and from a ninth-century reference to a church of St Serf at Culross (Cuileann Ros) in a Gaelic list of the mothers of various saints.

The original 13th-century abbey was cruciform in plan, without aisles. By the late 15th century the lay brothers had ceased to be part of the monastery, and the abbey community consisted of only 15 choir-monks. The western half of the monastic cloister range was therefore abandoned, and the nave was demolished around 1500, although it is possible that it was about to be rebuilt at the time of the reformation. The reformation parliament of 1560 outlawed monastic life in Scotland and the monastery was allowed to continue, but was planned to die out naturally with the death of the last monk. In the 1580s the local parish congregation began to worship in the old monastic east end.

In 1613 the heart of Edward Bruce, a son of Edward Bruce, 1st Lord Kinloss who built Culross Abbey House, was buried in the kirkyard in a silver casket after he was killed in a duel with Edward Sackville.

In 1633 the east end of the abbey church was legally and completely taken over for use as a parish church, while the adjoining buildings fell into decay. In 1642 the north transept was converted into a tomb house by Sir George Bruce of Carnock. Alabaster carved effigies of him, his wife, and eight children can still be viewed there today. The abbey was restored in 1823, although many original features were removed, including the transept chapels. Another restoration took place in 1905, by Glasgow architect Peter MacGregor Chalmers, which reinstated the chapels and left the buildings much as they can be seen today. The eastern parts of the church are still in use for worship, and are generally open to the public.

A Ley tunnel is said to exist beneath the abbey, and within is said to sit a man in a golden chair waiting to give valuable treasures to anyone who succeeds in finding him. According to one story, many years ago a blind piper decided to try and upon entering at Newgate with his dog he proceeded to search and could be heard playing his pipes as far as the West Kirk, three quarters of a mile away. Eventually the dog emerged into the daylight, however the piper was never seen, or heard of, again.

== Current use ==
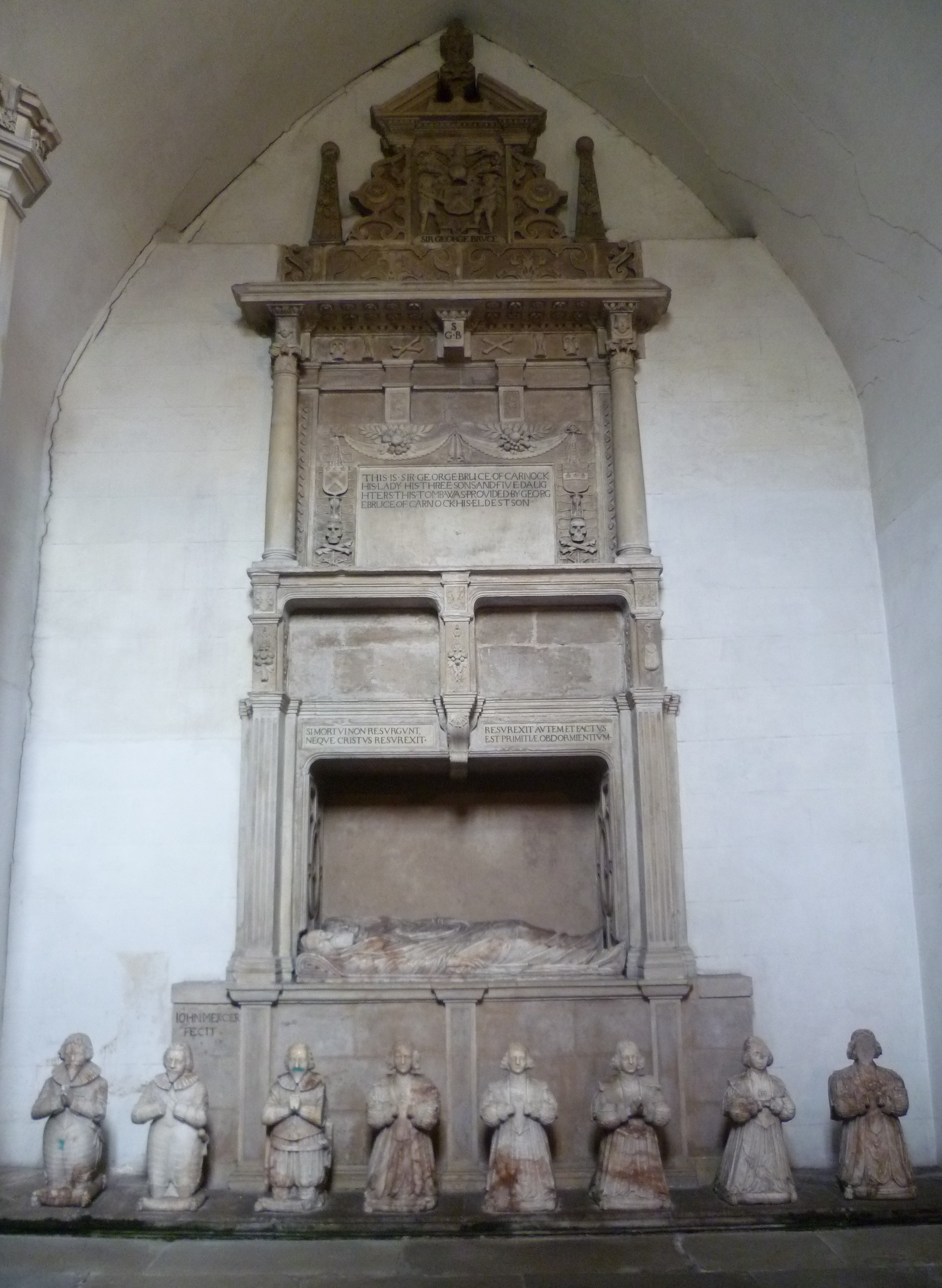
Sir George Bruce monument

The remaining ruins of the abbey are now in the care of Historic Environment Scotland. The remaining intact part of the Abbey was used by the Church of Scotland as the local parish church until November 2026. A service of closure was held on November 3rd marking the end of over 800 years of Christian worship at the site. The church contains stained glass in the main east window by the Edinburgh company of Ballantyne & Son, plus several modern stained glass windows.

The Abbey has played host to a number of cultural events, including an inaugural concert by Fife Opera.

== See also ==
- Abbot of Culross
- Elizabeth Melville (Lady Culross)
- List of Church of Scotland parishes
- Scheduled monuments in Fife
