= James Melville of Halhill =

Scottish diplomat (1535–1617)

Sir James Melville (1535–1617) was a Scottish diplomat and memoir writer, and father of the poet Elizabeth Melville.

== Life ==
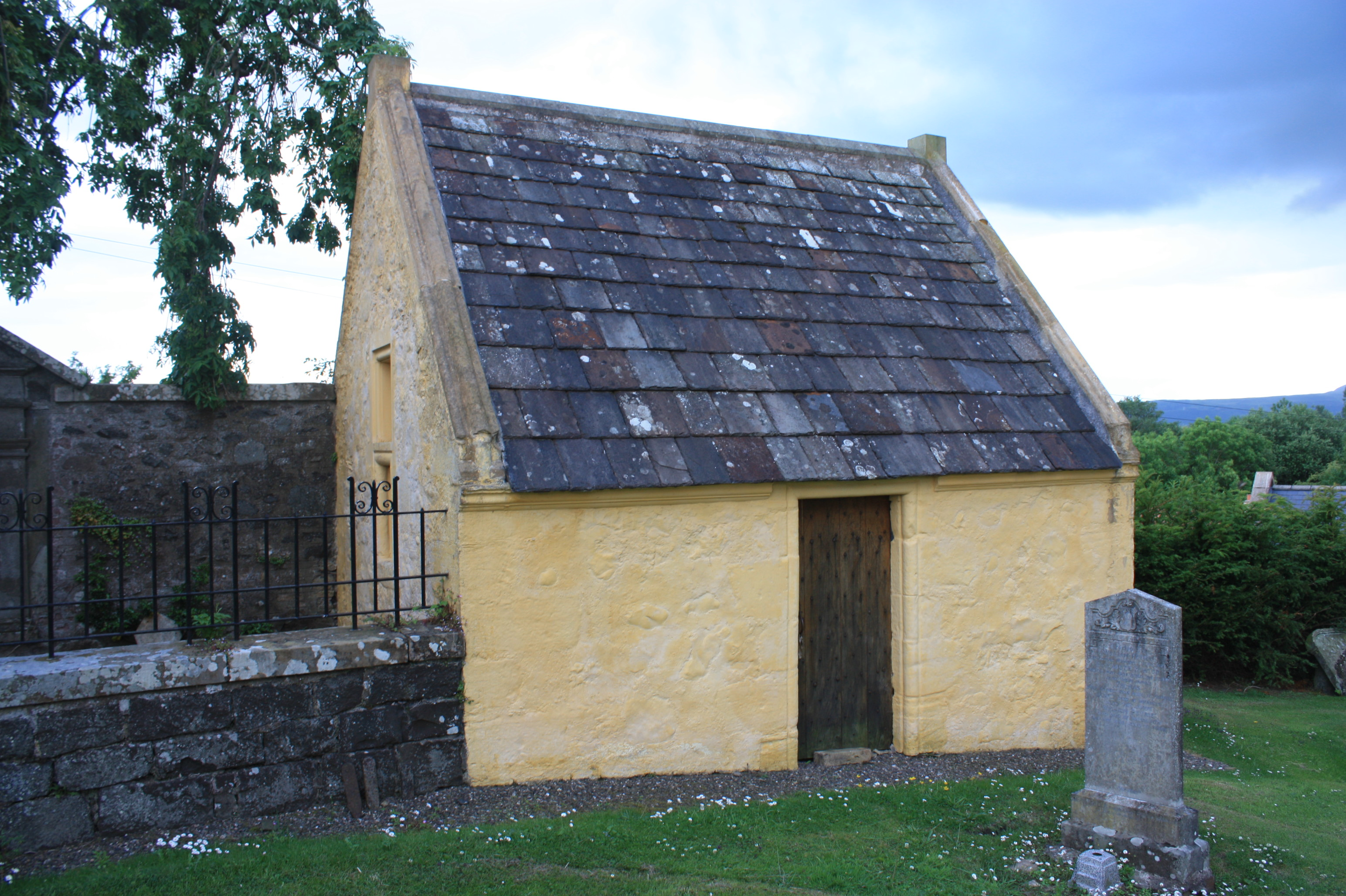
The vault of Sir James Melville in the Collessie churchyard, Fife.

Melville was the third son of John Melville of Raith, in Fife, who was executed for treason in 1548. One of his brothers was Robert, 1st Baron Melville of Monimail (1527–1621). In 1550, James Melville went to France with Jean de Monluc, Bishop of Valence at the request of Mary of Guise, who intended he should become a page to Mary, Queen of Scots. Melville first learned to speak French and play the lute in Paris, and in May 1553 joined the service of Anne de Montmorency, 1st Duke of Montmorency. Melville went on campaign with Montmorency in 1554. Serving at the Battle of St. Quentin in 1557 Melville was wounded and taken prisoner. He subsequently carried out a number of diplomatic missions for Henry II of France.

On Mary's return to Scotland in 1561 she gave Melville a pension and an appointment in her household. Sent to England as a diplomat, Melville included an account of his meeting with Elizabeth I in 1564 in his memoir. This often-quoted passage includes their discussion of the comparative attributes and accomplishments of the two queens. Elizabeth showed him miniature portraits and arranged for him to hear or overhear her play the virginals.

Melville said he had meals at Hampton Court with Lady Stafford and her daughter Elizabeth, who he had met in France. Mary, Queen of Scots, had instructed him to sometimes leave aside matters of gravity, and he discussed the fashions of clothings in Holland, Poland, Italy with Elizabeth. Elizabeth's clothes were of various styles, and he thought her golden hair was best shown when she wore an Italian-style kell (caul) and bonnet. William Cecil presented him with a gold chain.

Mary employed him as special emissary to reconcile Elizabeth to her marriage with Henry Stuart, Lord Darnley. Later, when an English merchant gave Melville a water spaniel, Melville gave the dog to Darnley. This gift displeased Mary as Darnley was not then in her favour.

Melville met the English agent Christopher Rokeby in Edinburgh in May 1566. In June 1566 he attended Mary in Edinburgh Castle, and when Mary Beaton told him of the birth of Prince James, he rode to London with the news. Melville was sent to Elizabeth with messages from Mary and her half-brother, the Earl of Moray. Melville was back in Edinburgh on 3 July.

After the murder of Darnley in February 1567, Melville joined Lord Herries in boldly warning Mary of the danger and disgrace of her projected marriage with Bothwell, and was only saved from the latter's vengeance in consequence by the courageous resolution of the queen. Just before the coronation of James VI, Melville was sent to Hamilton to invite the Archbishop of St Andrews and Abbot of Arbroath.

During the troubled times following Mary's imprisonment and abdication Melville conducted several diplomatic missions of importance, and won the confidence of James VI when the king took the government into his own hands. When Francis Walsingham came to Scotland as ambassador in September 1583, Melville was his escort.

When the Danish ambassadors, Manderup Parsberg, Henrik Below and Nicolaus Theophilus came to Scotland in June 1585. James VI appointed Melville, William Schaw, and the Laird of Segie to be their companions. Melville described the events of the embassy in his Memoirs. When they departed, Melville went to their ship and presented them with gold chains from King James and rewarded the gunners, trumpeters, and drummers.

Richard Douglas met him at Falkland Palace in 1588 and mentioned that his uncle Archibald Douglas was sending him a pair of virginals from London, for the education of his daughter, Elizabeth Melville.

Melville was knighted at the coronation of Anne of Denmark on 17 May 1590. Melville was delegated to entertain the English ambassador, Edward Somerset, 4th Earl of Worcester, who travelled to Edinburgh to congratulate James VI on his safe return from Denmark and marriage to Anne of Denmark. James VI gave the Earl a present of a ring set with seven diamonds. Melville entered the service of the queen as a Gentleman of her Chamber. In his memoir he records how he was appointed to the position by James VI at Falkland Palace and had to overcome the Queen's initial suspicions of him as her keeper and a potential informant.

Melville noted that Agnes Sampson was accused of witchcraft and the Earl of Bothwell was implicated. The Earl was supposed to have asked ten witches at Prestonpans to procure the death of King James with a wax image. Melville was present when King James questioned Ritchie Graham, another of the accused in the North Berwick witch trials. According to Melville, James Carmichael, kirk minister of Haddington, had the "history and whole depositions" of the accused.

In July 1593 an advisory council for the administration of her estates, the genesis of the "Octavians", was appointed and Melville was not included. On 24 July, Melville went to reassure two Danish ambassadors, Steen Bille and Niels Krag who were lodged at John Kinloch's house in the Canongate after the Raid of Holyrood.

In March 1594, Melville wrote in French to the Danish diplomat Christian Barnekow, describing the appointment of the Octavians. In the summer of 1594, Melville was involved in James's plan to improve the royal parks and seems to have requested landowners send deer. He attended Anne of Denmark at the baptism of Prince Henry at Stirling Castle in August 1594, standing behind her and making speeches for her in French to the ambassadors who brought gifts.

Having been adopted as his heir by the reformer Henry Balnaves, he inherited from him, at his death in 1579, the estate of Halhill in Fife; and he retired there in 1603, refusing the request of James to accompany him to London on his accession to the English throne. By his wife, Christina Boswell, he had one son and two daughters; the elder of these, Elizabeth Melville, who married John Colville, de jure 3rd Baron Colville of Culross, has been identified with the author of a poem published in 1603, entitled Ane Godlie Dreame.

Sir James Melville died at Halhill on 13 November 1617. He was buried in Collessie churchyard.

"Halhill" was the name of the main house of the lands of Easter Collessie in Fife.

== Marriage and children ==
In 1569 Melville married Christian Boswell (d. 1609), a daughter of David Boswell of Balmuto in Fife. Her father was said to have been a devout Catholic who welcomed a visit of Mary, Queen of Scots as an opportunity for his seven sons to hear mass said in their home.

Their children included:

- James Melville.
- Robert Melville
- Margaret Melville, who married Andrew Balfour of Montquhanie
- Elizabeth Melville, poet, mother to Alexander Colville
- Christian Melville, who married John Bonar of Lumquhat

== Works ==
At Halhill, Melville wrote the Memoirs of my own Life, a valuable authority for the history of the period, first published by his grandson, George Scott of Pitlochie, in 1683, from a manuscript discovered at Edinburgh Castle in 1660. The most complete edition of the Memoirs is that prepared by Thomas Thomson for the Bannatyne Club (Edinburgh, 1827), based on a manuscript discovered in 1827. Some eighteenth-century Scottish historians doubted the authenticity of Scott's publication. Gordon Donaldson notes in Scott (1683) some editing errors and suppression of the more sinister dealings of English government before Mary's condemnation.

== Sources and editions of the Memoirs ==
- Donaldson, Gordon, ed., The Memoirs of Sir James Melville of Halhill, Folio Society, London (1969), edited from George Scott (1683)
- Scott, George, ed., The Memoires of Sir James Melvil of Hal-Hill, Robert Boulter, London (1683)
- Steuart, A. Francis, ed., Memoirs of Sir James Melville of Halhill, 1535-1617, George Routledge London (1929), edited from George Scott (1683), linked Googlebook scan lacks front matter.
- Thomson, Thomas, ed., Memoirs of Sir James Melville, Bannatyne Club, Edinburgh (1827), from an original manuscript.
