= John Wemyss (landowner) =

Scottish landowner

Sir John Wemyss (11 April 1557 – 27 April 1624) was a Scottish landowner.

== Biography ==
He was the son of David Wemyss (d. 1596) and Cecilia Ruthven, a daughter of William Ruthven, 2nd Lord Ruthven.

His home was Wemyss Castle in Fife. The coastal location was sometimes called West Wemyss, and he was sometimes called the "Laird of West Wemyss".

In May 1583 James, Lord Doune, his father-in-law, wrote to him about his feud with the Laird of Balmuto, which James VI intended to resolve. Sir Robert Melville had said that House of Raith were always friends to Wemyss. James VI had been playing a game in the Peel of Linlithgow with the Laird of Dunipace, and said he fought on Wemyss' side. John Wemyss went to Loch Gelly and built a fort and kept an armed boat to prevent the Boswells of Balmuto fishing on the loch.

In 1592 he (and his father) provided a refuge at Wemyss castle for the Anne of Denmark's Danish lady-in-waiting Margaret Winstar whose partner John Wemyss of Logie had plotted with Francis Stewart, 5th Earl of Bothwell against the king. The queen wrote to thank him for looking after her servant. James VI had ordered her to send Winstar home. In April 1594 Winstar's husband, John Wemyss of Logie was lodged at Wemyss Castle.

He seems to have been knighted at Stirling Castle at the time of the baptism of Prince Henry in August 1594.

The laird of Wemyss was obliged to lodge borderers who were pledges for good behavior, including Jock Johnstone of Brummell in October 1597 and Willie Johnstone of Greenside in December 1598. He held Archie Armstrong of Whitehaugh from the Scottish Borders at Wemyss Castle for a time. John Wemyss and other lairds complained about this duty, and in April 1597 James VI wrote to him and asked him to bring Armstrong as a prisoner to be kept at Falkland Palace instead.

In the summer of 1599 James VI wrote to him for a hackney riding horse to send to Falkland Palace for the use of the French ambassador, Philippe de Béthune, brother of the Duke of Sully. The ambassador went to Perth and then hunting with the king in the west of Scotland.

In 1603 James VI and Anne of Denmark wrote to him requesting that he escort Anne of Denmark to London. John Wemyss had a long gallery built at Wemyss Castle overlooking the sea with lodgings above.

== Marriage and family ==
He married Margaret Douglas, daughter of Sir William Douglas of Lochleven in 1574. He married, secondly, Mary Stewart, daughter of James Stewart, 1st Lord Doune and Margaret Campbell, in 1581. Their children included:

- John Wemyss, 1st Earl of Wemyss (1586–1649)
- Isobel Wemyss (1588–1636), who married Hugh Fraser, 7th Lord Lovat in 1614 at Wemyss.
- Cecilia Wemyss, who married William Murray, 2nd Earl of Tullibardine
- Catherine Wemyss, who married Sir John Haldane of Gleneagles
