= Fife Opera =

Coordinates: 56°6′42.99″N 3°9′50.6″W

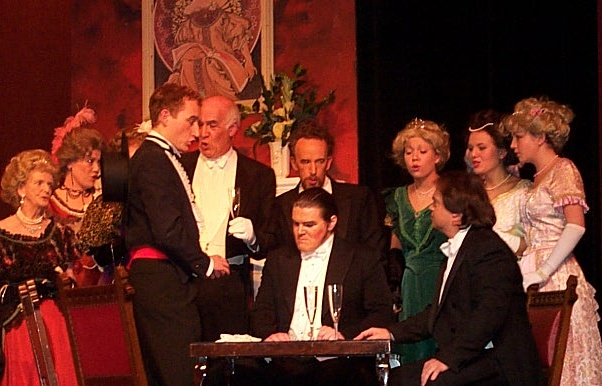
Scene from Fife Opera's 2004 production of La traviata

Fife Opera is a semi-professional grand opera company dating back to 1976, and based in Kirkcaldy, Scotland. It has produced over 40 full-scale productions since its inception.

At present, it is one of only a handful of companies left in Scotland today producing large-scale operas, and one of the few to routinely to play with a full orchestra, and the foremost company of its sort in Fife.

== History ==
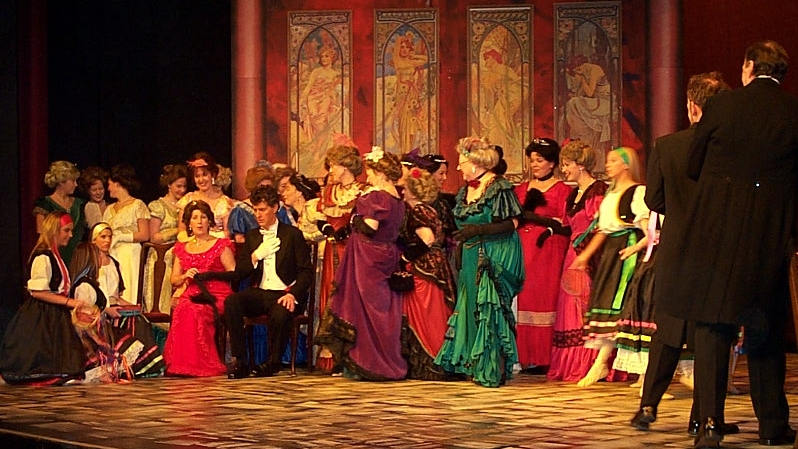
On the arrival of the entertainers in La traviata, act 2, scene 2

The company was founded in 1975 with the impetus being provided by Kirsty Adam, who was then keen to draw together a number of opera enthusiasts and singers from across the county. In 1978, the company performed Menotti's Amahl and the Night Visitors in the 13th-century Cistercian Culross Abbey.

From the outset, the musical director, Richard Galloway, insisted on auditioning everyone interested in joining, and insisted on high vocal quality and level of professionalism from company members. Despite this, for the company's first full-scale production from 1979, Bizet's Carmen, a cast of 54 took to the stage, accompanied by a 37-piece orchestra.

A bomb scare interrupted Fife Opera's 1981 production of Smetana's The Bartered Bride leading to hordes of Bohemian peasants being spilt out into the War Memorial Gardens.

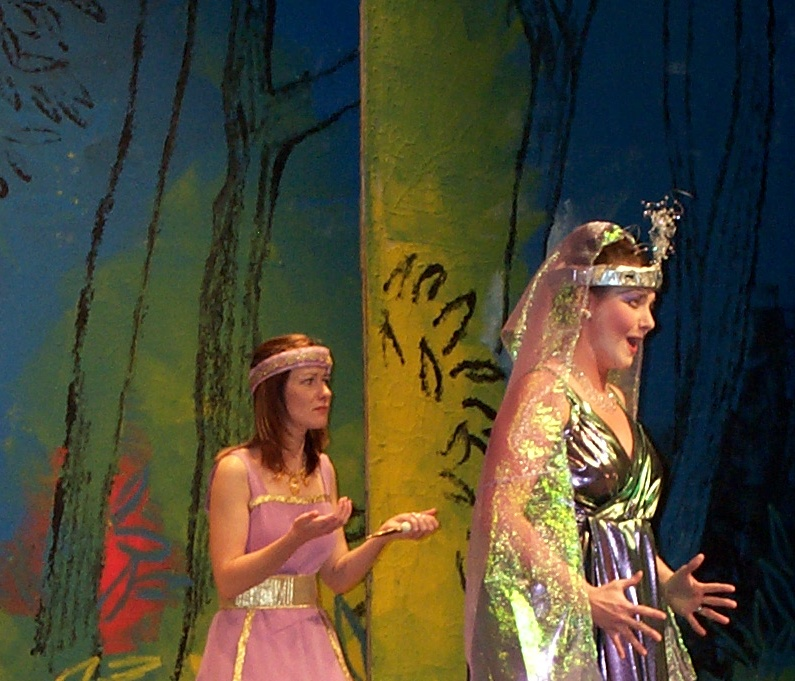
The Magic Flute from 2006

The company has appeared at Falkland Palace and Stirling Castle, and headlined the inaugural concert at Buckhaven Theatre.

Prominent musical personalities associated with the company include Jennifer Galloway, principal oboist with the BBC Philharmonic, trumpeter John Wallace, current principal of the Royal Scottish Academy of Music and Drama, Lesley Ross, principal soprano with D'Oyly Carte Opera Company and numerous former company members who have graduated from the Royal Scottish Academy and elsewhere.

Fife Opera has a large proportion of younger singers, and increasingly is geared towards outreach and touring. In recent years, it has appeared annually at the Edinburgh Festival.

Highlights from the company's past productions include Aida in 2004 and the 1983 presentation of La traviata. Among the comparative rarities performed are Lakmé by Léo Delibes, Les pêcheurs de perles by Georges Bizet, and Noël Coward's Bitter Sweet.

In 2011 the company ran a highly successful "Come and Sing" Carmen; it then performed, for the first time The Tales of Hoffmann by Jacques Offenbach as its annual production in the Adam Smith Theatre in Kirkcaldy and gave a Christmas concert. 2012 saw the "Come and Sing" idea developed further with a "Come and Sing from the Shows" day in March and a "Come and Sing" Aida in May.

== Funding ==
Fife Opera is a registered charity and receives funding and support from the National Operatic and Dramatic Association (NODA), Making Music and the Scottish Arts Council.
