= Samuel Colvil =

Scottish poet and satirist

Samuel Colvil (fl. 17th century), also spelled Colvill or Colville, was a Scottish poet and satirist, best known for his mock poem The Whiggs Supplication, also known as The Scotch Hudibras.

== Life and family ==
Samuel Colvil was active during the latter half of the 17th century. He was the youngest of the three sons of the notable Scottish poet Elizabeth Melville, Lady Culross and John Colville, the Commendator of Culross and heir to the title of his uncle, Lord Colville of Culross. In contrast to his devout mother, Colvil was characterized by his "generally irreverent behavior" and was said "to have taken little seriously." Due to a lack of detailed information, the nature of his relationship with his parents is a matter of scholarly interpretation based on his known character. Early scholars expressed "dismay on her behalf" regarding his writing and conduct.

In a letter of 1631 to John Livingstone, Elizabeth had commented that ‘Samuell is going to the colledge in Sant Andrews, to a worthy maister thair, bot I feare him deadly’, which indicates that her youngest child's behaviour had long been unpredictable.

It is highly probable that Samuel Colville, rather than James or Alexander, was the son referred to by Melville's correspondent Samuel Rutherford when he wrote to her on 9 July 1637: ‘As for your son, who is your grief, your Lord waited on you and me, till we were ripe, and brought us in. It is your part to pray and wait upon him. When he is ripe, he will be spoken for. Who can command our Lord’s wind to blow? I know that it shall be your good in the latter end.’

Samuel Colvil in his works did not acknowledge his belonging to the family beyond the verse:

Samuel was sent to France,
To learn to sing and dance,
And play upon a fiddle:
Now he's a man of great esteem, ---
His mother got him in a dream,
At Culross on a girdle.

== Works ==
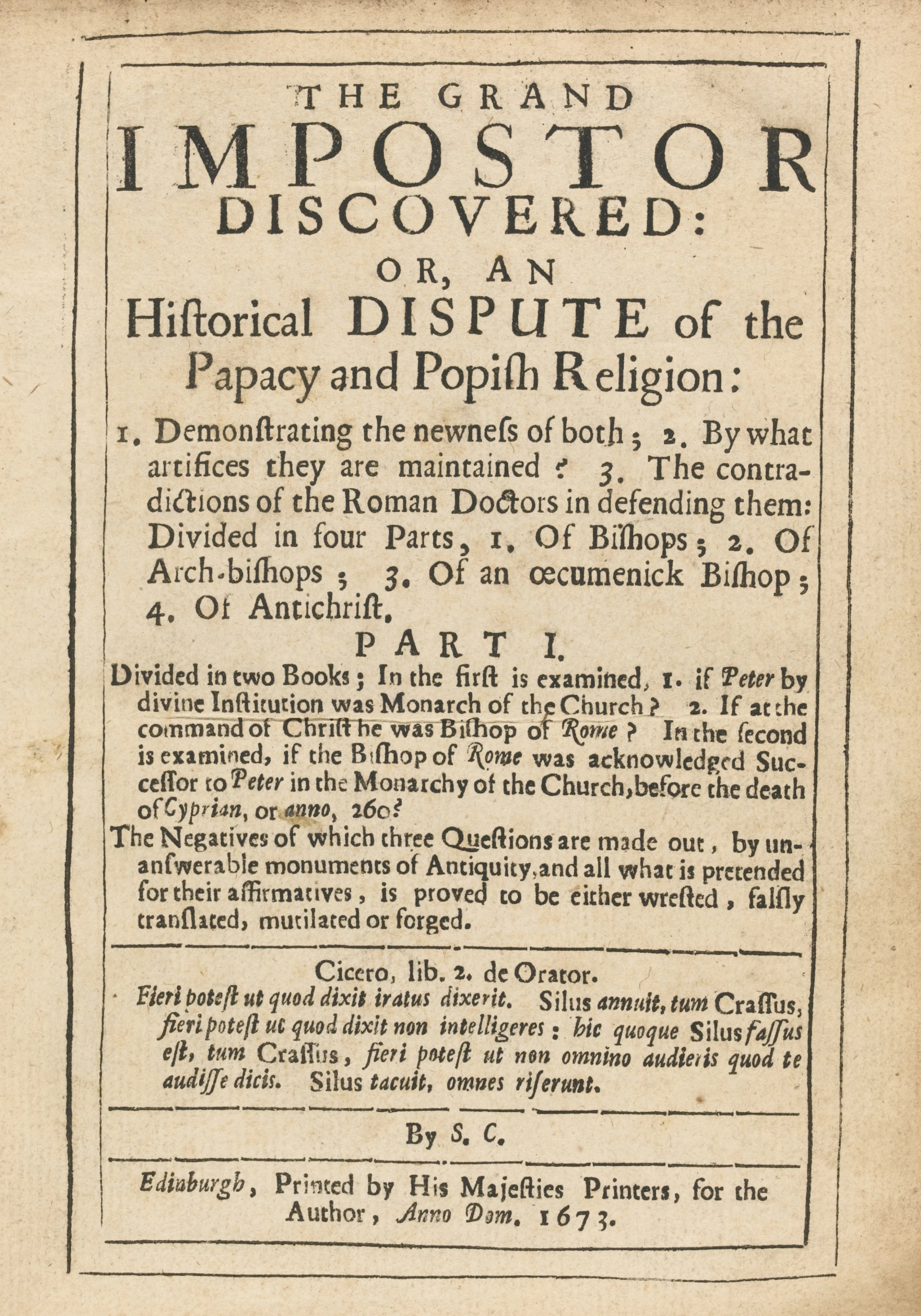
Title page of The Grand Impostor Discovered by Samuel Colvil (1673)

Colvil's literary output was primarily satirical. His two known major works are:

- The Grand Impostor Discovered: An attack on the papacy, published in Edinburgh. First published in 1673, a large tome was titled, The Grand Impostor Discovered: or, An Historical Dispute of the Papacy and Popish Religion, supposedly the first of two. No further parts ever appeared.
- Mock Poem, or, Whiggs Supplication (1681): This is his most famous work. It is a satirical mock poem aimed at the Scottish Presbyterians and written in imitation of Samuel Butler's Hudibras. The work circulated in manuscript form for years before its first printing; a manuscript version from as early as 1667 exists in the Scottish archives. The poem was first published in London in 1681 and was frequently reprinted under various titles, including The Whiggs Supplication and, most notably, The Scotch Hudibras.

Three of Samuel's doggerel pasquils (from 1643, 1669 and 1673) survive in manuscript, attacking Clerk Register Sir Alexander Gibson, Bishop Gilbert Burnet and the Earl of Dundonald respectively.

== Sources ==
- Keck, Karen Rae (May 2006). Elizabeth Melville's Ane Godlie Dreame: A Critical Edition (Doctor of Philosophy thesis). Texas Tech University.
- "NA16537 - Person Record: Samuel Colvill". Scottish Archive Network Catalogue. National Records of Scotland.
