= Lochgelly =

Town in Fife, Scotland

Coordinates: 56.12816°N 3.31109°W

Lochgelly: Scottish Gaelic: Loch Gheallaidh
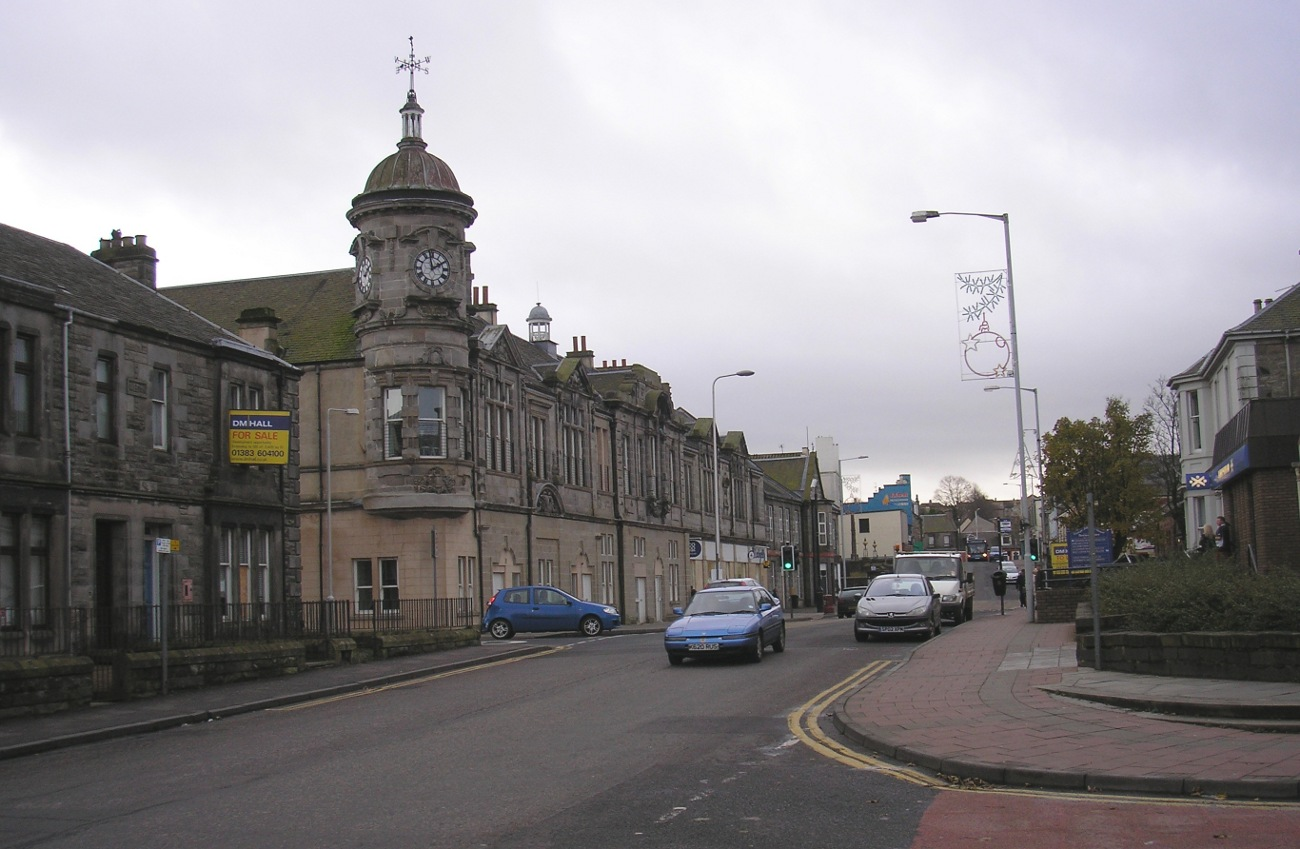
- Lochgelly in November 2008

- Location within Fife
- Population: 7,300 (2020)
- OS grid reference: NT186936
- Council area: Fife
- Lieutenancy area: Fife
- Country: Scotland
- Sovereign state: United Kingdom
- Post town: LOCHGELLY
- Postcode district: KY5
- Dialling code: 01592
- UK Parliament: Glenrothes and Mid Fife
- Scottish Parliament: Cowdenbeath

Lochgelly (/lɒxˈɡɛli/; Scottish Gaelic: Loch Gheallaidh, IPA:[ˈɫ̪ɔxˈʝaɫ̪ai]) is a town in Fife, Scotland. It is located between Lochs Ore and Gelly to the north-west and south-east respectively. It is separated from Cowdenbeath by the village of Lumphinnans. According to the 2007 population estimate, the town has a population of 6,834.

== History ==
Lochgelly, as part of the old parliamentary constituency of West Fife, was known as "Little Moscow" up to the 1950s owing to its Communist political leanings.

An area of Lochgelly was known as the Happy Lands (or Happy Valley) and is referred to in the Scottish folk song 'The Kelty Clippie'.

The town is served by Lochgelly railway station on the line between Edinburgh and Markinch.

== Economy ==
In the 1970s new investment was brought in the form of a factory and development office built by the Andrew Corporation. This created microwave antennae under the banner of Andrew Antennas, symbolised by a red lightning flash on the dishes they made. These dishes were primarily for commercial and military usage. The firm located at the end of "The Avenue" on the south-east side of the village. Adjoining fields were used for testing new equipment.

Lochgelly is also the home of the most reputed firm that produced tawses, John Dick (Saddlers), and was hence a synonym for that typically Scottish device for corporal punishment.

== Gelly Loch ==
The town derives its name from the nearby body of water, Loch Gelly. The name comes from the Gaelic Loch Gheallaidh which, loosely translated, means ‘Shining Waters’ or ‘Loch of Brightness’. Land around the loch is owned by Wemyss 1952 Trustees.

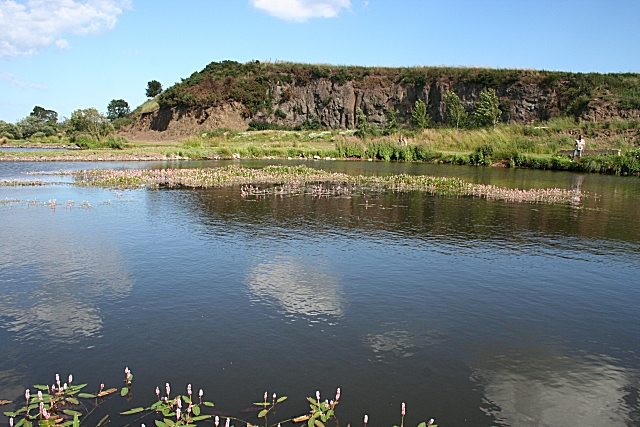
Loch Gelly. The town derives its name from this body of water.

The loch was once a very popular spot for the local community and was used on a regular basis for water skiing up until the early 90s. Since then the loch has not been used for water sports.

Lochgelly Loch was noted to be one of the best lochs to catch very large perch, pike and eels. There has never been any trout in the loch. There was a large pond to the west of the loch, which was known locally as the Pike Pond. This was filled in, when the A92 was built. In years gone by, in harsh winters, locals skated and played curling on the loch.

== Entertainment ==
Lochgelly used to be served in the entertainment sector by the Lochgelly Centre, which had a 424-seat theatre that was ideal for community theatre groups, dance groups and music events. The Lochgelly Centre closed in 2010 for remodelling/refurbishment work, leaving Lochgelly without any access to children's facilities, elderly facilities, community access to various events and classes. The centre re-opened in 2012 and has facilities including the New Jennie-Lee library. The centre runs classes and has a theatre.

The town is also entertained by Lochgelly Town Hall, which is now establishing itself as a venue for live music.

== Sport ==
=== Football ===
Lochgelly is home to the football club Lochgelly Albert, who play in the East of Scotland League First Division. Former clubs include Lochgelly United who played in the senior leagues between 1890 and 1928 and Lochgelly Violet.

=== Motor racing ===
There is quarter mile oval racing track just outside the town known as Lochgelly Raceway. The circuit hosted the 2013 Superstox World Championship.

== Community organisations ==
To tackle issues of multiple deprivation in the town various organisations such as the Coalfields Regeneration Trust have been given funding monies to distribute locally via community-based groups such as social enterprises, charities and voluntary groups.

Lochgelly Community Council holds meetings, on the last Thursday of Every Month except December, to discuss issues affecting Lochgelly, from planning issues to general issues representative of the local community. All meetings are open to the public. The Community Council is made up of local members of the Lochgelly Community. Monthly minutes from the meetings are available in the Lochgelly Library and on the Lochgelly Community Council website.

The Lochgelly Community Development Forum (LCDF), until early 2011 known as the Lochgelly Community Regeneration Forum, is a voluntary group representing the interests of the local community and providing a forum for raising local issues with Fife Council. The LCDF publish a 2 sided glossy newsletter, The Voice, which is delivered to every home in Lochgelly. This replaced a full magazine, designed for free by a locally based not-for-profit Social Enterprise (Subliminal Directions), now closed.

Mooth O the Yooth, is a local non-profit group, managed by and for local youths, with support from Fife Council workers, community wardens and community police officers. The 'Moothies' aim to provide and set up activities for other youths in the area. Activities and successes include arranging the 'Bairns Ball' (a youth disco), which is held on a monthly basis in Lochgelly. The Moothies obtained a Youth Shelter (an open steel construction, similar to a bus shelter, with a seating area and roof to provide some shelter), located at the bottom of Lochgelly Public Park. The shelter has since been vandalised.

In January 2010 'Loch of Shining Waters', an online not-for-profit community platform, was launched. It allows members of the local community to publish articles about Lochgelly, raise issues of concern and find out more about local issues. The aim is to release all material under a Creative Commons Licence, provide information about Lochgelly and the issues affecting the town and provide tutorials covering a wide range of technologies, such as using open source scripts for gaining a web presence, as well as articles on computer and online safety.

The Royal Oak Community Club provided affordable venue hire for many smaller groups in the local community, such as the Lochgelly Community Council, dance groups and meals for the elderly. It gained charitable and social enterprise status and planned to redevelop their building with a complete upgrade of facilities but appears to have been abandoned for several years.

== Development ==
=== Fife Ethylene Plant ===
Approximately 4 km from Lochgelly is the Fife Ethylene Plant, known locally as Mossmorran and run by ExxonMobil. This is one of Europe's largest ethylene plants and is bordered by the communities of Lochgelly, Lumphinnans, Cowdenbeath and Auchtertool.

There is local concern over the impacts Mossmorran has on the local communities regarding flaring events, noise pollution, light pollution, vibrations, safety, health and environmental impacts. There are also supporters of the development.

ExxonMobil invest in the local area through community schemes, such as the Links programme, which provides additional funding to the majority of schools in the local communities surrounding the complex.

=== Wind farm development ===
Installation of the first wind turbine of nine at the Little Raith wind farm, south of Lochgelly, was completed in September 2012. The farm is 1.6 km south of the nearest houses in Lochgelly and 1.3 km from Cowdenbeath. It is Fife's first commercial wind farm and is immediately to the north of the Fife Ethylene Plant.

The wind farm is owned by Kennedy Renewables who purchased the site from West Coast Energy.

=== Future development ===
In 2010 Lochgelly participated in the Lochgelly Charrette, led by designer Andrés Duany. The Lochgelly Charrette was the only charrette in Scotland to be led by the local authority.

The Charrette process has identified areas in need of regeneration within the town centre and aims to improve the central area of Lochgelly by regenerating existing walkways and buildings. It included a review of all design-based policies, simplifying the mechanisms to achieve good design for planning zones, cross departmental working with the transportation services so proposals can work towards the Scottish Government policy statement 'Designing for Streets'.

There has been much local criticism of the Lochgelly Charrette. It received criticisms from the Community Council and the Lochgelly Development Forum for ignoring them on specific issues. There were objections to the halting of plans for a supermarket with petrol station in favour of plans for a smaller store objected. There was also criticism of the removal of Lochgelly Golf Course and other green areas for housing developments.

Further plans include completely redeveloping the town centre to improve access and better integrate walkways. The plan will take until 2066 to be fully realised.
