= Raith, Fife =

Area of Fife, Scotland

Coordinates: 56.110°N 3.235°W

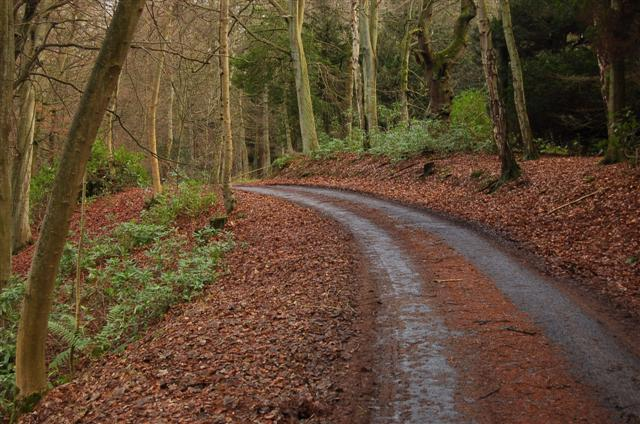
A track on the Raith Estate

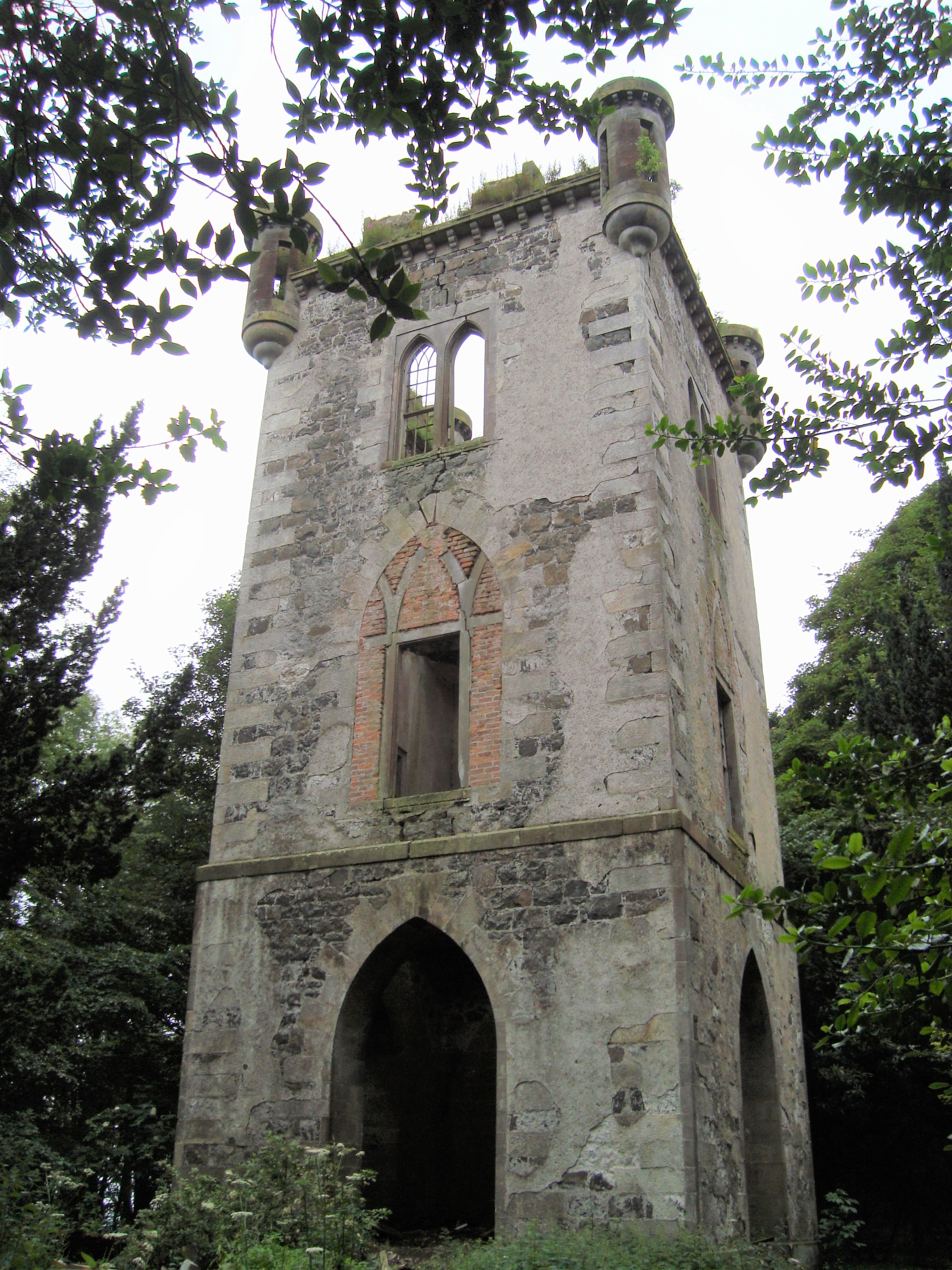
Raith Tower

Raith (Scottish Gaelic: ràth, "fort" or "fortified residence"), as an area of Fife, once stretched from the lands of Little Raith (earlier Wester Raith), south of Loch Gelly, as far as Kirkcaldy and the Battle of Raith was once theorised to have been fought here in 596 AD. Raith Hill, west of Auchtertool and immediately to the east of the Mossmorran fractionation plant, may also be in reference to this wider area or may refer to an actual fort on this hill, distinct to the one naming the area.

The name is found in Kirkcaldy's professional football team, Raith Rovers. This name was earlier borne by an entirely distinct team, probably named for the Little Raith colliery, east of Cowdenbeath, which merged with Cowdenbeath Rangers to form Cowdenbeath F. C.

Raith House and the 19th-century folly Raith Tower sit on Cormie Hill to the west of Kirkcaldy. The former was designed by James Smith in the Palladian style in the 1690s, remodelled and extended by James Playfair in the 1780s and the library and garden remodelled in 1899 by Robert Lorimer. To the southeast, the artificial Raith Lake was formed by the damming of the Dronachy Burn in 1811 and 1812. From the late nineteenth century onwards, tracts of land of the Raith Estate were sold off and developed for housing and to form the town's Beveridge Park, expanding Kirkcaldy westwards. The modern housing estate bearing the Raith name dates from the latter part of the 20th century, long after the origins of the football team.

== See also ==
- Robert Ferguson of Raith
- Robert Munro Ferguson
- Ronald Craufurd Ferguson
- Ronald Munro Ferguson, 1st Viscount Novar
- John Melville of Raith
- Lord Raith, Monymaill and Balwearie
