= John Melville of Raith =

Sir John Melville of Raith (died 1548) was laird of Raith in Fife, Scotland. He was active in the Scottish court in the second quarter of the 16th century, but was executed for his support of the Protestant cause.

Sir John Melville, laird of Raith in Fife, was early impressed by the principles of the Reformation, and associated himself closely with the movement. He was one of the three hundred noblemen and gentlemen whom Cardinal Beaton pressed King James V to pursue as heretics. As a friend of those who assassinated Cardinal Beaton at St Andrews, he was subsequently executed by Beaton's successor, Archbishop John Hamilton.

During the minority of Mary, Queen of Scots, Melville was a steady favourer of the policy of the 'English Party' in Scotland, who sought to consolidate the interests of the two nations by uniting the crowns in the marriage of Edward VI and Mary, Queen of Scots. Melville was arrested, carried prisoner to Edinburgh, and, being convicted of treason, was executed there on 13 December 1548. His estates were forfeited. According to John Knox, Melville had a natural son in England, John Melville, with whom he regularly corresponded while the two countries were at war. Melville was arrested when one of these letters fell into the hands of the governor of Scotland, Regent Arran.

== Biography ==
He was the eldest son of John Melville the younger of Raith and Janet Bonar, his wife, probably a daughter of the laird of nearby Rossie. He succeeded his grandfather, William Melville, as laird of Raith in 1502, and was knighted by James IV in the following year, probably on the occasion of that king's marriage in August to Princess Margaret Tudor.

He is said to have accompanied James IV to Flodden (1513), but if so he returned in safety, and was more or less actively engaged in the many disputes of the regency during the minority of James V (1513–1528). He was appointed Master of the Artillery for life in October 1526, but a few months later he took part with John, Earl of Lennox, in his unsuccessful attempt to free the king from the control of the Earl of Angus, and had to sue to Angus for mercy. Yet within a brief space the Douglases were in exile, and for intercommuning with them Melville had to beg a remission from the crown.

With James V (ruled 1528–1542), whose banner he followed in several of his expeditions to the Borders and elsewhere, Melville stood in considerable favour, and the king took a personal interest in the staunching of a blood-feud between him and his neighbour, Moultray of Seafield. The feuding became so bad that King James V was forced to intervene personally in 1533, arranging at Cupar for umpires to reach an amicable settlement between the warring factions. The Moultrays were confirmed in their former compensation arrangement of 12 merks per annum for the original killing of John Moultray by an earlier Melville, and this continued for many years. This appears to have been a renewal of the sum granted four decades earlier to the son of the original victim to be spent upon a priest who would celebrate a mass "in a fitting place".

In 1529, Moultray, who remained staunchly Catholic, heard that Melville was on his way to Kirkcaldy to murder James Beaton, Archbishop of St Andrews. Moultray and his ally Vallence (Wallace) and a few followers stood with a band of armed followers in Kirkcaldy High Street. Melville approached on horseback. Neither side would give way. Vallence was slain and Melville was seriously wounded. The legal accounts show that Kirkcaldy of Grange, was later executed for treason.

He was a member of the juries who tried Janet Douglas, Lady Glamis, and Sir James Hamilton of Finnart, who were both executed for conspiring to bring about the death of the king, in 1537 and 1540 respectively. About 1540 Melville was made captain of the castle of Dunbar, and had the custody of several important state prisoners.

Melville was early impressed by the principles of the Reformation, and associated himself closely with the movement. He was one of the three hundred noblemen and gentlemen whom David Cardinal Beaton pressed James V to pursue as heretics. During the minority of Queen Mary (1542–1561), Melville was a steady favourer of the policy of the Protestant, pro-English party in Scotland, who sought to consolidate the interests of the two nations by uniting the crowns in the marriage of the infant Mary with Edward VI of England.

Sir John had a natural son who lived in England, John Melville, with whom he regularly corresponded while the two countries were at war. One of his letters fell into the hands of the Scottish governor, Arran, and he was arrested and carried prisoner to Edinburgh. As a friend of those who assassinated Cardinal Beaton in 1546, he was convicted of treason by Beaton's successor, Archbishop Hamilton.

He was executed at Edinburgh on 13 December 1548. His estates were forfeited, but this forfeiture was rescinded in favour of his widow and children in 1563.

== Family ==
The children of John Melville included:

- Robert Melville, 1st Lord Melville (1527–1621)
- James Melville of Halhill, diplomat and writer, father of the poet Elizabeth Melville
- Andrew Melville of Garvock, Master of the Household to Mary, Queen of Scots and later to James VI.
- William Melville, Lord Tongland, lawyer and diplomat.
- Margaret who married James, son of John Scrimgeour
