= Battle of Raith =

Hypothetical battle of 596 AD

Coordinates: 56°07′02″N 3°11′36″W

Location	near Kirkcaldy, Scotland
Result	Angle victory

Belligerents
Gaels; Picts; Britons	Angles

Commanders and leaders
King Aedan	Unknown

The Battle of Raith was the theory of E. W. B. Nicholson, librarian at the Bodleian Library, Oxford. He was aware of the poem Y Gododdin in the Book of Aneirin and was aware that no-one had identified the location "Catraeth". He parsed the name as "cat" Gaelic for battle or fight, and "Raeth" and he recalled that there was a place in Scotland called Raith.

Nicholson's claim was that this battle was fought in 596 AD to the west of present-day Kirkcaldy. An invading force of Angles landed on the Fife coast near Raith and defeated an alliance of Scots, Britons and Picts under King Áedán mac Gabráin of Dál Riata.

Today the location of the Battle of Catraeth is usually recognised instead as Catterick.

Nicholson's proposition was given added circulation when it was included in the local history book "Kirkcaldy Burgh and Schyre" by its editor and co-author Lachlan Macbean.
