= Loch Gelly =

Small lake in Fife, Scotland

- Loch Gheallaidh
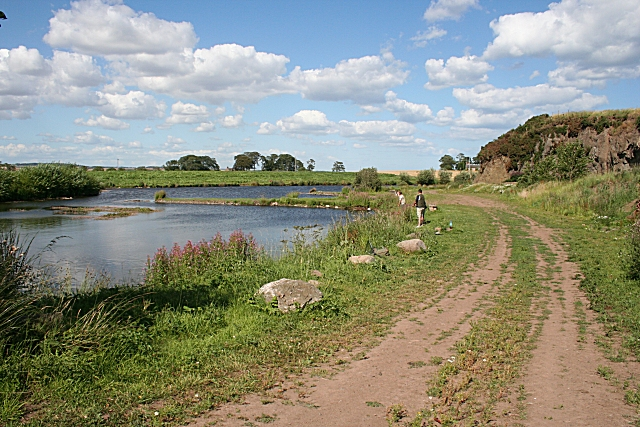
- Gelly Loch

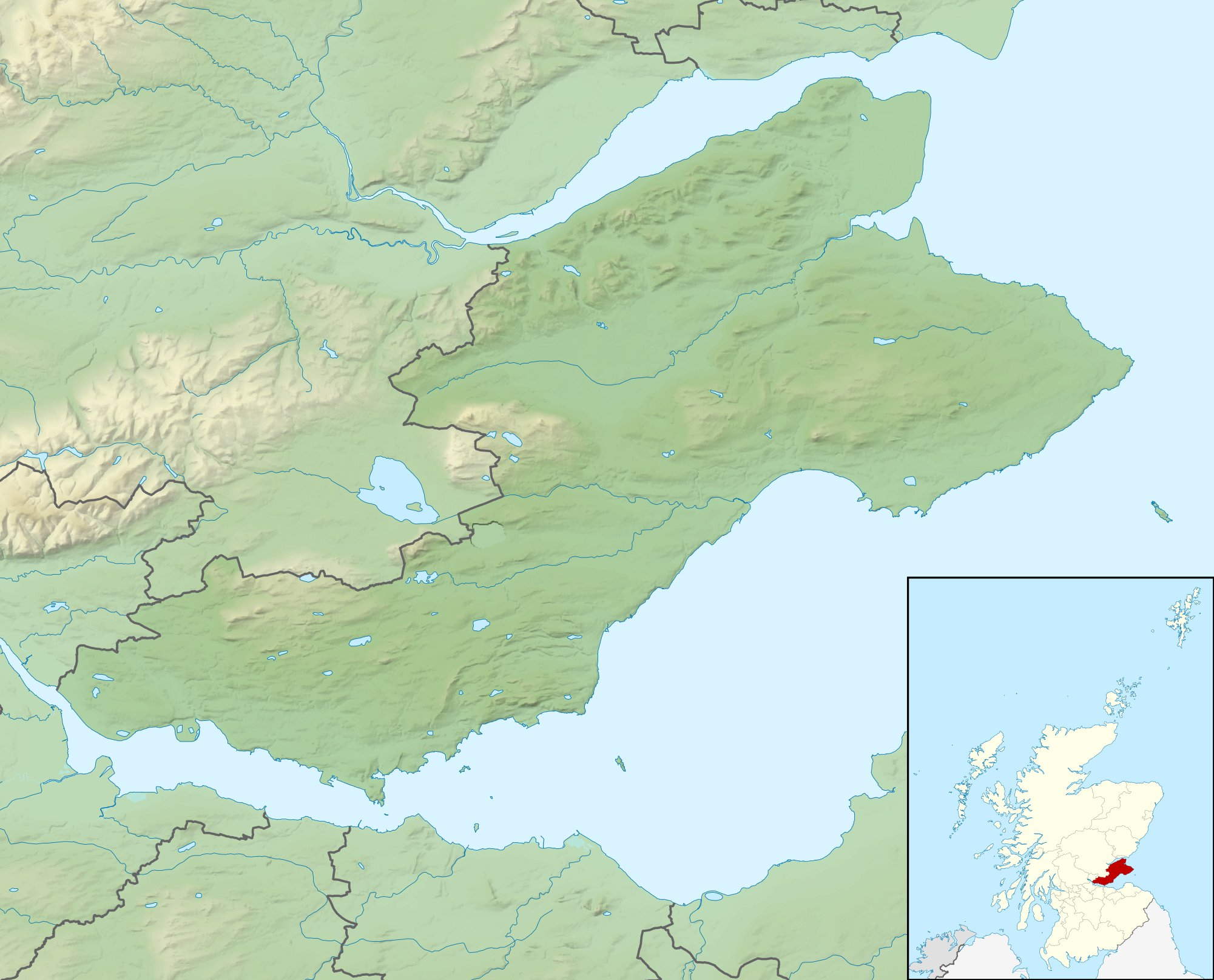
- Location within Fife
- Location: Fife, Scotland
- Coordinates: 56°7′3″N 3°17′12″W
- Type: freshwater loch
- Primary inflows: Lochgelly burn
- Primary outflows: Lochgelly burn
- Basin countries: Scotland
- Max. length: 1.21 km (0.75 mi)
- Max. width: 0.80 km (0.5 mi)
- Average depth: 2.1 m (7 ft)
- Max. depth: 2.7 m (9 ft)
- Water volume: 910,000 m^{3} (32,000,000 ft^{3})
- Surface elevation: 107.0 m (351.2 ft)

Loch Gelly (Scottish Gaelic: Loch Gheallaidh) is a small loch in Fife, Scotland lying approximately 1.5 km to the south east of the town of Lochgelly which itself is named after the loch. The Gaelic name of the loch, Loch Gheallaidh, can be loosely translated as Loch of Shining Waters or Loch of Brightness. It is a broad, shallow flat bottomed basin approximately 1.75 km in length from west to east and 0.75 km wide at its maximum breadth.

In May 1583, Sir John Wemyss built a fort on the south side of the loch and kept an armed boat to prevent the Boswells of Balmuto from fishing in the loch.

Land around the loch is owned by Wemyss 1952 Trustees.

The loch was surveyed on 11 May 1905 by Sir John Murray and later charted as part of The Bathymetrical Survey of Fresh-Water Lochs of Scotland 1897-1909.
