= Abbot of Culross =

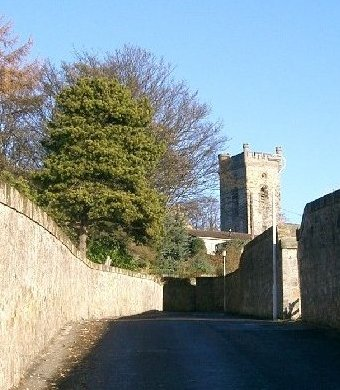
The tower of Culross Abbey.

The Abbot and then Commendator of Culross was the head of the monastic community of Culross Abbey, Fife, Scotland. The abbey was founded in 1218 on the patronage of Maol Choluim I, Earl of Fife by Cistercian monks from Kinloss Abbey, Moray. Control of the abbey was secularized in the 16th century and after the accession of James Stewart, the abbey was held by commendators. The number of monks under the abbot had also declined by the 16th century, there being only 15 monks by 1557.

== List of Abbots ==
- Hugh (I), 1217-1227
- William de Ramsay, 1230-1232
- Hugh (II), 1232-1245
- Matthew, 1245-1246
- Geoffrey, 1246-1252
- Michael, 1252-1260
- John de Haddington, 1260
- Gilbert, c. 1296
- ???, d. 1329 x 1331
- Adam de Strivelyn (or Scrawelyn), x 1337-1340
- Walter, 1340x1354
- Adam de Crail, c. 1399
- John de Peebles, c. 1399-1435
- Robert de Wedale, 1435-1444
- Laurence de Lindores, 1436-1443 x 1444
- Richard Marshall, 1449-1467 x 1469
- James Rait, 1468 x 1469-1489 x 1490
- Laurence Button, x 1486
- Andrew Mason, c1486
- John Hog, 1490-1492
- Andrew Forman, 1492-1493
- Thomas, 1492-1493
- Andrew Mason (again), 1493-1510
- Philip of Luxembourg, c. 1510
- James Stewart, 1511-1513

== List of Commendators ==
- Thomas Nudry, 1514-1527
- Peter de Accoltis, 1529
- James Inglis, 1529-1531
- Sixtus Zuchellus, 1531
- William Colville, 1531-1567
- John Colville (I), 1535-1550 x 1552
- William Colville (again), 1550 x 1552-1567
- Francis Stewart, 1567
- Alexander Colville, 1567-1581/7
- John Colville (II), 1581–1587,
- Alexander Colville (again), 1587-1597
- John Colville (again), 1597-1609

== Current ministry ==
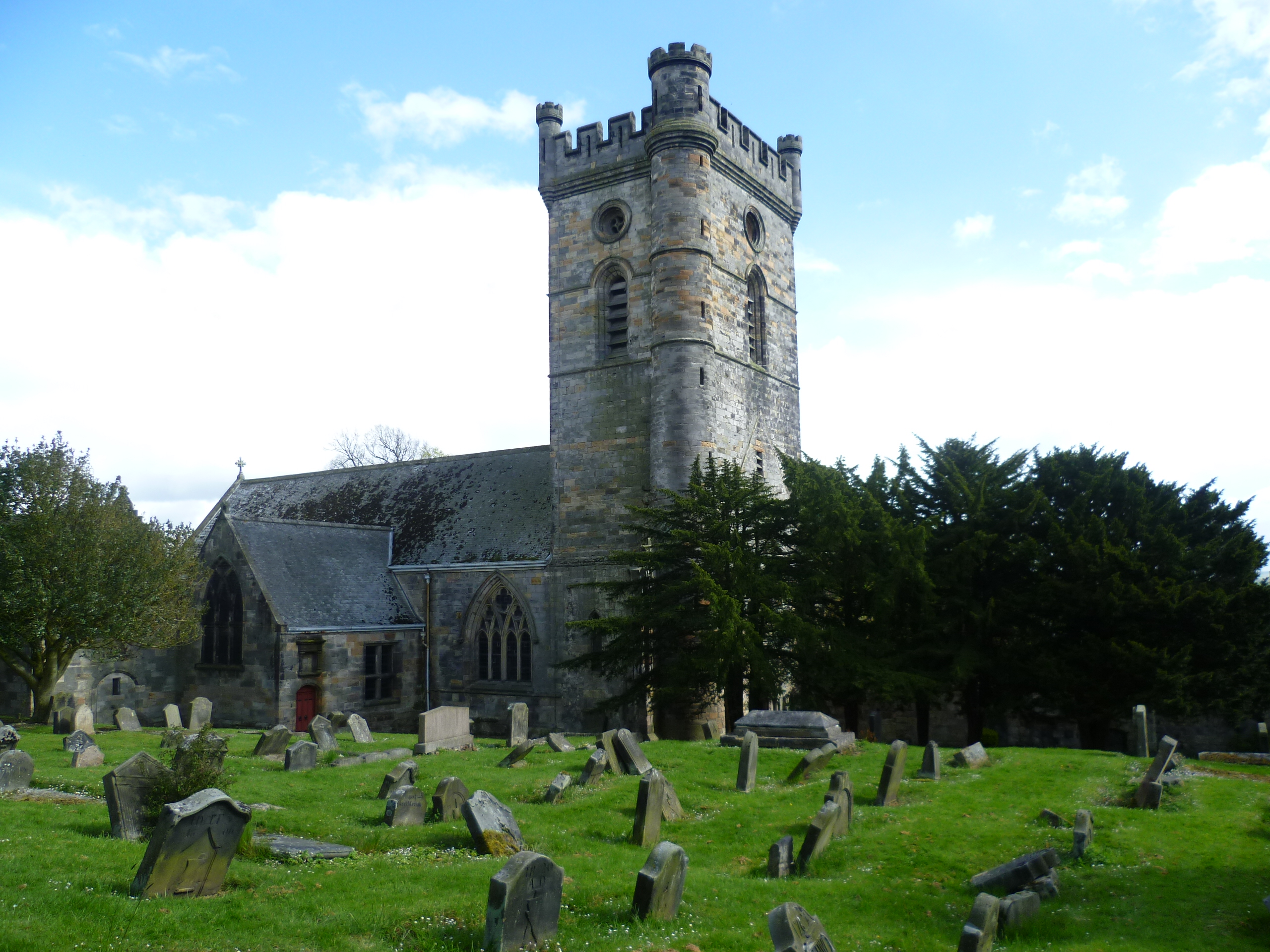
Culross Parish Church

The remaining intact part of Culross Abbey is still used by the Church of Scotland as the local parish church. The current minister of Culross Abbey (since 2009) is the Reverend Jayne Scott.

== Bibliography ==
- Cowan, Ian B. & Easson, David E., Medieval Religious Houses: Scotland With an Appendix on the Houses in the Man, Second Edition, (London, 1976), p. 74
- Watt, D.E.R. & Shead, N.F. (eds.), The Heads of Religious Houses in Scotland from the 12th to the 16th Centuries (The Scottish Records Society, New Series, Volume 24), (Edinburgh, 2001), pp. 50–4
