= Lady Jean Stewart =

Scottish noblewoman (1533–1587)

- Born: c. 1533
- Died: 7 January 1588 (aged 54-55); Edinburgh
- Buried: Holyrood Palace, Edinburgh
- Noble family: House of Stuart
- Spouse: Archibald Campbell, 5th Earl of Argyll
- Father: James V of Scotland
- Mother: Elizabeth Bethune

Lady Jean Stewart (also known as Jane Stuart; c. 1533 – 7 January 1588), was an illegitimate daughter of King James V of Scotland by his mistress, Elizabeth Bethune (sometimes spelled Betoun or Beaton).

== Childhood ==
Jean was born between 1528 and 1537. Her mother Elizabeth was the daughter of Sir John Bethune, 2nd of Creich, and Janet Hay. Elizabeth Bethune was first married to John Stewart, 4th Lord Innermeath, by whom she had two sons: James Stewart, later 5th Lord Innermeath and the poet John Stewart of Baldynneis. She married, secondly, James Gray, son of Patrick Gray, 4th Lord Gray.

As an infant, Lady Jean Stewart was brought up in the household of Mary of Guise, the Queen of Scotland as wife of King James V, and then briefly in the nursery of the Queen's eldest son, Prince James, the Duke of Rothesay, her legitimate half-brother. The Scottish treasurer's accounts record purchases for the infant Lady Jean.

In September 1538, Jean Stewart was given a canopy made with 27 ells of red, yellow, and green cloth. A clothing account from 1538 mentions a "hood of the French sort" made from black velvet and lined with red "crammesy" satin for Jean Stewart. The coif or frontlet was embellished with a gold "chafferoun" of Paris or filigree work made by John Mosman. In November, Jean was at Falkland Palace with Mary of Guise. Her nurse was Christine Baxter. Baxter's kirtle was altered in December 1538 to made a "gown of the French fashion" then prevailing at the Scottish court.

By March 1539, Jean Stewart was housed with her illegitimate half-brothers, "Lord James of Kelso and "Lord James of Saint Andrews", and had a black velvet and taffeta night gown lined with 'martrik' sable. In May 1539 she moved with the court from Stirling Castle to St Andrews. Her clothes were washed at Falkland Palace in April 1540. In May 1540, at St Andrews, James V gave her nurse 22 shillings, and in July she was sent seven hanks of coloured silks and cloth to embroider samplers, and in December 1540, she was given a missal and a matins book.

A list of payments for livery clothes for the household servants of the two Princes made in January 1541 includes two servants of their half-sister Lady Jean Stewart; Cristiane Baxstar and the chamberer Thomas Stroupe. Mary of Guise's son by her first marriage, François III d'Orléans, Duke of Longueville, received a gift of a gold chain from James V's daughter, probably Lady Jean Stewart, and in return he sent another chain, with blue and green enamelled gold beads Jane Stewart seems to have been in France with Mary, Queen of Scots. Accounts held by the National Library of Scotland mention clothes for her, and her tailor. As Mary's half sister, she was known at the French court as "Mademoiselle la bâtarde d'Ecosse".

== Countess of Argyll ==
On 5 July 1553, Jean's marriage contract with Archibald Campbell, 5th Earl of Argyll was signed at Falkland Palace. Her jointure property included the lordship of Lorne and a cash dowry of 5,000 merks to be paid by Mary of Guise and Jean's brothers, the Commendators of Kelso, Holyrood, and Coldingham. In August 1553, Henri Cleutin mentioned the process of obtaining a dispensation from Rome for her marriage, "le memoire touchant Mademoiselle la bastarde et le filz du Conte d'argueillz".

A wardrobe account of Mary of Guise includes clothes made as a gift for Lady Jean shortly before her wedding. Her cloak and skirt front had decorative bands of black satin. The wedding itself was in April 1554, possibly at Castle Campbell.

During her married years, Jean lived for a time at Dunoon Castle, where her half-sister, Mary, Queen of Scots, visited her in 1563, and granted several charters during her stay there. The queen gave her a substantial allowance or pension of £150 Scots paid three times each year.

The Countess was at Holyrood Palace in December 1563. Mary, Queen of Scots, was tired after dancing on her twenty-first birthday and stayed in bed. The ambassador Thomas Randolph gave the Countess a diamond ring for Mary, a gift from Elizabeth I.

In February 1566, following the Chaseabout Raid, Mary gave her a charter of lands including Castle Campbell which were forfeited by her husband for his part in the rebellion.

On the night of 9 March 1566, Jean Stewart, her mother Elizabeth, and her half-sister Queen Mary, witnessed the murder of Queen Mary's secretary, David Rizzio, at Holyroodhouse. At the baptism of Prince James at Stirling Castle in December 1566, she went in the chapel on behalf of the English ambassador, the Earl of Bedford, and was godmother. He gave her a valuable ruby ring.

== Divorce ==
After the "lang siege" of Edinburgh Castle in 1573, Lady Jean and her aunt Margaret Beaton were taken prisoner. She requested not be delivered to her husband, the Earl of Argyll. They were divorced on 23 June 1573, the reason being desertion. The French ambassador in London, Bertrand de Salignac de la Mothe-Fénelon wrote that Argyll had rejected her to marry another woman. The English ambassador Henry Killigrew reported she was living comfortably at Regent Morton's board in June 1574, probably at Dalkeith Palace.

== Later life ==
In May 1583 she had an illness described as a "spire of appoplexie" and considered finding a treatment in France, travelling through England.

She died at her lodging in the Canongate of Edinburgh which she rented from the goldsmith William Cokkie on 7 January 1588, attended by her servant and "special friend" Katrine Hamilton. Jean made Katrine her executor. She bequeathed her best gowns and perfumed beads, described as "ane pair of muist beidis of gold", to Marie Stewart, Mistress of Gray.

Lady Jean Stewart was buried next to her father, King James V, in the royal vault at Holyrood Palace in Edinburgh.

== Ancestors ==
Ancestors of Lady Jean Stewart

8. James III of Scotland
4. James IV of Scotland
9. Margaret of Denmark
2. James V of Scotland
10. Henry VII of England
5. Margaret Tudor
11. Elizabeth of York
1. Lady Jean Stewart
12. John Betoun, 5th of Balfour
6. David Betoun of Creich
13. Mary Boswell
3. Elizabeth Bethune
14. Stephen Duddingston, 1st of Sandfurd (Saintford)
7. Janet Duddingston
