= Rosyth Castle =

- Rosyth, Fife
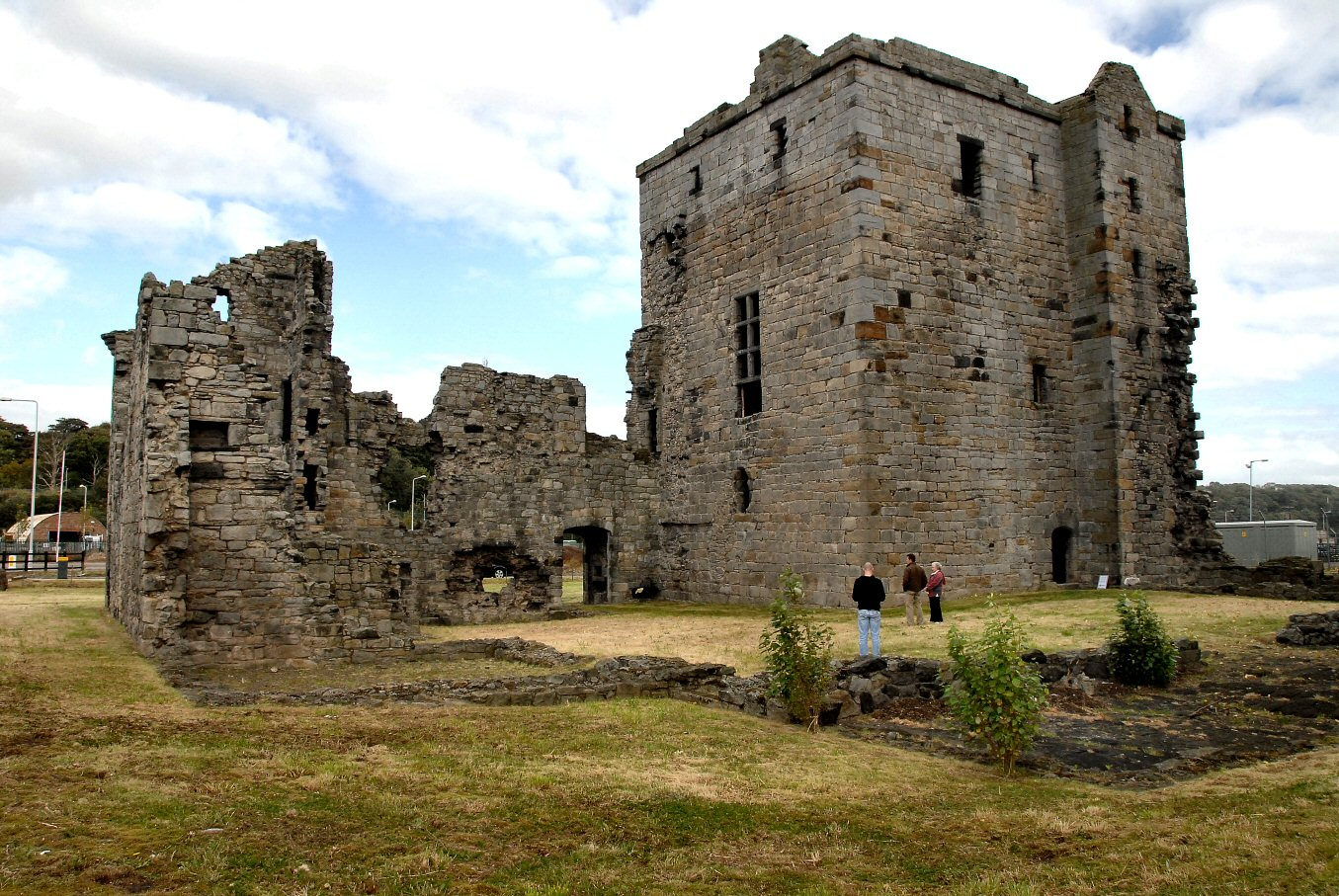
- Rosyth Castle from the south

Location
- Coordinates: 56.0235°N 3.4314°W

Scheduled monument
- Official name: Rosyth Castle
- Type: Secular: castle
- Designated: 5 July 1995
- Reference no.: SM9150

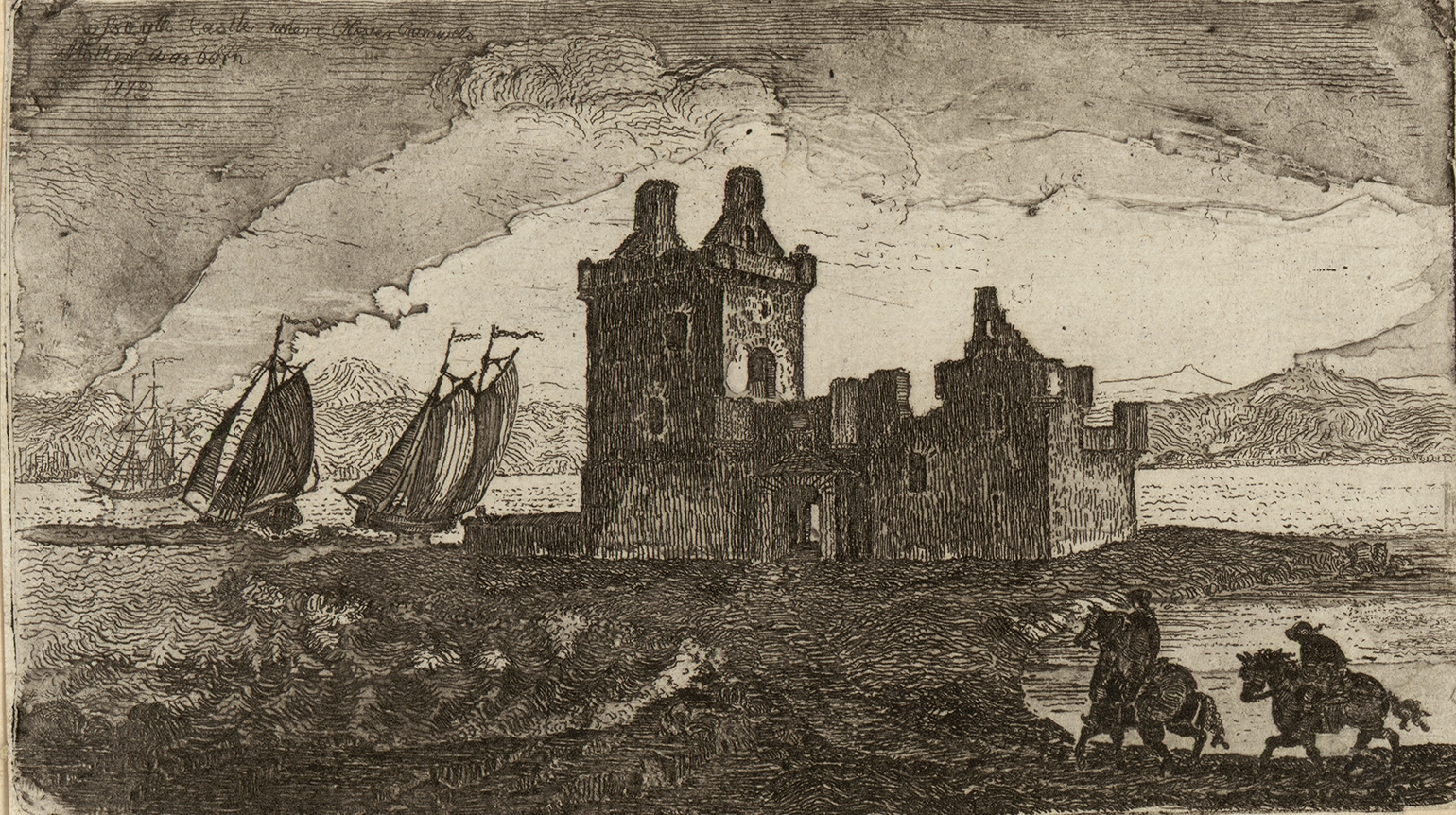
18th Century engraving of Rosyth Castle

Rosyth Castle is a fifteenth-century ruined tower house on the perimeter of Rosyth Naval Dockyard, Fife, Scotland.

It originally stood on a small island in the Firth of Forth accessible only at low tide, and dates from around 1450, built as a secure residence by Sir David Stewart, who had been granted the Barony of Rosyth in 1428.

The original tower house (58 feet high) was enlarged and extended in the 16th and early 17th centuries.

In 1572 it was attacked by men from Blackness Castle on the southern shore of the Firth of Forth and it was occupied in 1651 by Oliver Cromwell's army after the Battle of Inverkeithing.

It remained a Stewart residence until it was sold in the late seventeenth century to David Drummond of Invermay. It ultimately ended up in the possession of the Earl of Hopetoun and from the eighteenth century onward remained unoccupied. During this and later periods large parts of the stonework were re-used in other structures, and the later courtyard buildings were almost razed to the ground, leaving only the tower and north courtyard wall remaining significantly above ground-floor level.

It became Admiralty property in 1903 and as the result of land reclamation lost its waterfront position, becoming marooned within the dockyard. Although plans were made to restore and use the building, they came to nothing and the structure was made safe in its current condition. It passed into private hands when large tracts of the surrounding dockyard were sold.

About half a mile north of the castle is a well-preserved sixteenth-century dovecot, with a crow-stepped gable roof, with carved heads at two corners. Internally it has a barrel vaulted ceiling.

== References and external links ==
- RCAHMS Inventory of Fife, Kinross and Clackmannan, HMSO 1933

Footnotes
