= Battle of Dömitz =

1635 battle of the Thirty Years' War

- Part of the Thirty Years' War
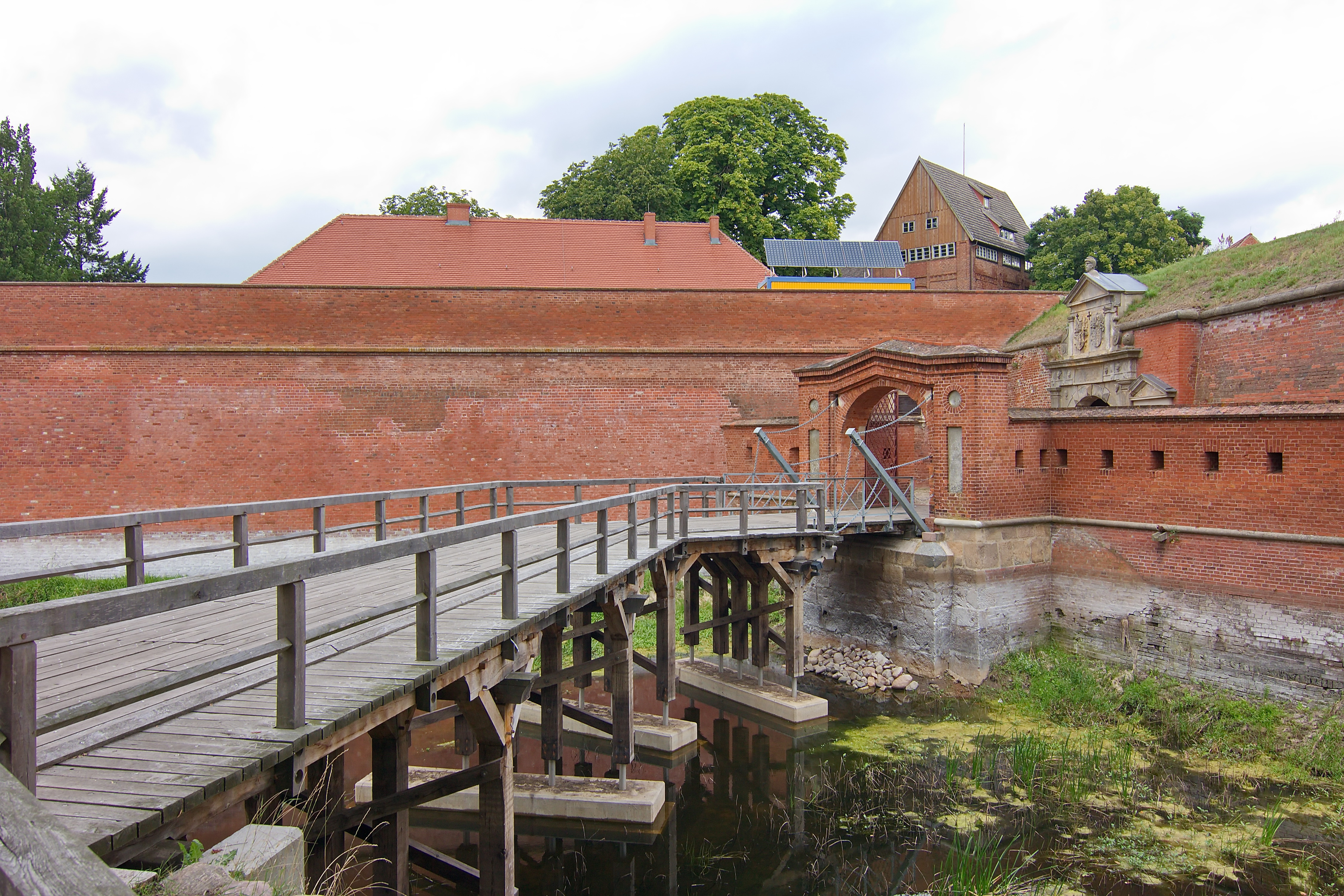
- Entrance to Dömitz Fortress
Date	22 October 1635
Location	Dömitz, Mecklenburg-Vorpommern 53°08′30″N 11°15′00″E
Result	Swedish victory

Belligerents
Swedish Empire	Holy Roman Empire; Saxony

Commanders and leaders
Patrick Ruthven; Lt-Colonel Jetzwitzny; Torsten Stålhandske	von Baudissin; Lt-Colonel Büna (POW)

Strength
c. 5,000	6,000–7,000

Casualties and losses
Unknown	3,500 to 5,000 dead, wounded, or captured

The Battle of Dömitz took place on 22 October 1635, during the Thirty Years' War. A Saxon force led by von Baudissin was besieging Dömitz Fortress when it was surprised by a Swedish relief column under Patrick Ruthven. Baudissin's detachment was effectively destroyed, losing between 3,500 and 5,000 men, including 2,500 prisoners who were incorporated into the Swedish army.

== Background ==
The Swedish intervention in the Thirty Years' War began in June 1630 when nearly 18,000 troops under Gustavus Adolphus landed in the Duchy of Pomerania and entered the Holy Roman Empire. Backed by French subsidies, and supported by the Protestant states of Saxony and Brandenburg-Prussia, Gustavus won a series of victories over Imperial forces before he was killed at Lützen in November 1632. The war continued despite his death, Sweden and its German allies forming the Heilbronn League in April 1633.

However, after the Imperial army defeated the Swedes and their German allies at Nördlingen in 1634, Saxony made peace with Emperor Ferdinand II. At this point, the Swedish position in Germany seemed fatally compromised, their presence reduced to a few scattered garrisons in Saxony, and 26,000 mutinous troops under Johan Banér in Halberstadt and Magdeburg. (Note: Less than 3,000 of these were actually Swedish, the rest being German, many of whom came from states previously allied with Sweden, but had switched sides after the Peace of Prague.)

In August 1635, the newly appointed Saxon commander, von Baudissin, concentrated his troops around Leipzig. (Note: Previously an energetic and effective commander, by 1635 Baudissin was an alcoholic, whose troops had little confidence in him.) His purpose was to prevent Banér crossing the River Elbe, and cut his supply lines with Stralsund and Stettin to the north, in Swedish Pomerania. On 28 September, Brandenburg-Prussia accepted the Peace of Prague, and Banér withdrew north, leaving a few regiments to hold Magdeburg.

Dömitz campaign; key locations in text

By 15 October, Banér and his remaining troops had reached Artlenburg, and on 19th they began crossing the Elbe into Mecklenburg, despite Saxon attempts to prevent this. Another force led by Baudissin besieged the Swedish garrison of Dömitz, 50 kilometres to the south, who also sent a detachment to Gardelegen to block Swedish troops in the Altmark under Patrick Ruthven from intervening.

== Battle ==
On 20 October, Baudissin sent the bulk of hs cavalry to Grabow, hoping to intercept Swedish units in the town. He retained 6,000 to 7,000 infantry to continue the siege, but their dispatch gave Ruthven an opportunity. Early on the morning of 22 October, he arrived outside Dömitz with 4,000 cavalry and 800 infantry, taking Baudissin by surprise.

The Saxon troops in the town came under heavy fire from the Swedes in the fortress, and withdrew outside the walls in disorder. Attacked by Ruthven in front, and the garrison under Lt-Colonel Jetzwitzny from behind, they disintegrated after three hours of fighting, losing 5,000 dead, wounded, or taken prisoner. (Note: Other sources suggest between 3,500 and 4,000 dead, wounded, or captured.) Baudissin escaped, but several senior officers were captured, including his deputy, Lt-Colonel Büna, along with the guns and baggage. A brief counterattack by Imperial cavalry was beaten off by Torsten Stålhandske.

== Aftermath ==
Ruthven absorbed most of the prisoners into his regiments, although Dömitz was retaken by Saxony on 4 August 1637. Banér successfully crossed into Pomerania, while the September 1635 Treaty of Stuhmsdorf with Poland meant the Swedes no longer needed to guard against a possible Polish intervention. This allowed 9,700 recruits under Lennart Torstensson to be moved from Prussia to reinforce Banér, enabling the latter to relieve Magdeburg, and regain much of the territory previously lost. By spring 1636, the Saxons were back in Halle, close to Leipzig where their advance began in 1635.

== Sources ==
- Ersch, Johann Samuel von (1836). Allgemeine Encyclopädie der Wissenschaften und Künste (in German). BN Brodhaus.
- Knox, Bill (2017). Tucker, Spencer (ed.). Enduring Controversies in Military History Volume I: Critical Analyses and Context. Greenwood Press. ISBN 978-1440841194.
- Pütter, Johann Stephan (1795). Grundriß der Staatsveränderungen des Teutschen Reichs (in German) (2019 ed.). Wentworth. ISBN 978-0530832968.
- Riches, Daniel (2012). Protestant Cosmopolitanism and Diplomatic Culture: Brandenburg-Swedish Relations in the Seventeenth Century (Northern World). Brill. ISBN 978-90-04-24079-7.
- Wedgwood, C. V. (1938). The Thirty Years War (2005 ed.). New York Review of Books. ISBN 978-1-59017-146-2.
- Wilson, Peter (2009). The Thirty Years War: Europe's Tragedy. London: Belknap Press. ISBN 978-0-674-06231-3.
