= Elizabeth Bethune =

Mistress of King James V of Scotland

Elizabeth Bethune, or Beaton (died after 1581), was one of the mistresses of King James V of Scotland. Their daughter, Lady Jean Stewart, married Archibald Campbell, 5th Earl of Argyll.

Elizabeth was the daughter of Sir John Beaton of Creich, a nephew of James Beaton, Archbishop of St Andrews, and Keeper of Falkland Palace.

As an infant, Elizabeth's daughter Jean Stewart was brought up in the household of Mary of Guise (the Queen of Scotland as wife of King James V), and then briefly in the nursery of her legitimate half-brother, Prince James, the Duke of Rothesay, the infant son of King James V.

Subsequently, Elizabeth was married to John Stewart, 4th Lord Innermeath, by whom she had two sons, James Stewart, 5th Lord Innermeath and the poet John Stewart of Baldynneis. Elizabeth and her husband John were granted lands in the parish of Inverkeilor in May 1544.

In 1572 she married secondly James Gray, son of Patrick Gray, 4th Lord Gray. In 1578 Gray fathered a child by her niece, Isobel Beaton. The subsequent quarrel led to sieges of Redcastle in Angus, and several court cases. She got her divorce in 1581.
