= James Stewart, 5th Lord Innermeath =

James Stewart, 5th Lord Innermeath (died 1586) was a Scottish peer, courtier and landowner.

He was the son of John Stewart, 4th Lord Innermeath and Elizabeth Beaton, daughter of David Betoun of Creich. She was a former mistress of James V of Scotland.

His younger brother was the court poet John Stewart of Baldynneis. His maternal half-sister was Jean Stewart, Countess of Argyll.

He became Lord Innermeath on the death of his father in 1579. Innermeath in Strathearn is now called Invermay.

He claimed in July 1582 that his family had held the right to the Colonelship of the Sherrifdom of Perth for generations, but Patrick Lord Drummond had challenged this right and stole away his court documents at the Market Cross of Dunblane.

He died on the 14 February 1586.

== Marriage and family ==
He married Helen Ogilvy, daughter of James, 4th Lord Ogilvy of Airlie. Their children included:

- John Stewart, 1st Earl of Atholl (1566–1603), who married (1) Margaret Lindsay, daughter of David Lindsay, 9th Earl of Crawford and Katherine Campbell, (2) Marie Ruthven, the widow of John Stewart, 5th Earl of Atholl, and daughter of William Ruthven, 1st Earl of Gowrie and Dorothea Stewart.
- Robert Stewart, who was a servant of the murdered Earl of Moray, and in 1592 tried to assassinate the Earl of Huntly in revenge. He disguised himself in Highlandman's clothes for an attempt made in Perth.
- Katherine Stewart, who married William Ruthven of Ballindean, and was the mother of Patrick Ruthven, 1st Earl of Forth

Peerage of Scotland
Preceded by John Stewart	Lord Innermeath; 1569–1586	Succeeded by John Stewart
