= John Stewart of Baldynneis =

Scottish courtier

John Stewart of Baldynneis (c. 1545–c. 1605) was a writer and courtier at the Scottish Court. He was one of the Castalian Band grouped around James VI.

He was the son of Elizabeth Beaton, a former mistress of James V, and John Stewart, 4th Lord Innermeath, who died in January 1570. He was the younger brother of James Stewart, 5th Lord Innermeath. His nephew, John Stewart was 6th Lord Innermeath and became Earl of Atholl.

He was known as "John Stewart of Redcastle and Laitheris", and after his brother Lord Innermeath gave him the lands of Balydnneis in Dunning on 26 April 1580 as "Stewart of Baldynneis".

In 1579, James Gray, son of Patrick Gray, 4th Lord Gray, married Elizabeth Beaton, who owned the Red Castle, Angus. They quarreled and Gray (with his brother Andrew of Dunninald) occupied the castle. James VI ordered John Erskine of Dun and his son Robert to bring siege engines and eject Gray, with the help of the townspeople of Dundee. Erskine was asked to make an inventory of the goods in the castle and give safe conduct for Elizabeth Beaton's son, John Stewart the poet, to the king's presence.

He was the translator of Ariosto's Orlando Furioso producing an abridgement in twelve cantos in 1590 preceding Sir John Harington's translation the following year. The translation appeared with some of his own poems in a volume bearing the title Ane Abbregement of Roland Fvriovs, translait ovt of Aroist: togither vith sym Rapsodies of the Avthor's yovthfvll braine, and last ane Schersing ovt of trew Felicitie; composit in Scotis meiter be J. Stewart of Baldynneis a copy of which is preserved in the Advocates Library, Edinburgh.

This may well have been the 'propyne' of verse which Stewart gave to James VI as a New Year's Day gift. Stewart wrote of a "laurel crown" and the king deserving a "doubill croune and moir", not just referring to the likelihood of James inheriting the English throne, but also to coronation of Petrarch as poet-king in Rome in 1341, or that of Conrad Celtes in 1487.

Stewart's poems frequently evoke the imagery of precious stones, their colours, and the heraldic connection to moral virtues. These relationships were explored in Scots in the earlier Deidis of Armorie. Stewart's sonnet Of the Signification of Colors summarises his version of these traditional identifications:

The color red of hardiment is sing :
And quhyt ane lyf unspottit dois declair :
Greine schaws that comfort in the hart dois spring :
The purpur luif : Blak steadfastnes and cair :
Broune bourdsum is : And brycht Incarnat fair
In honest dealing takith ay delyt;
And glansing cleir columbie maist preclair
Presents ane Royall courtassie perfyt :
The blew is trew, And sanguine hew dispyt :
Orange content : And gray dois hoip to speid :
The tannie lykith craft and to Bakbyt : [tanny was mixed colour like purple]
And blaiknit yallow is foirsakin veid.

Quhan I this sonnet of thir hews did mak,
for my estate, thocht I, aggreis the Blak.

Although Stewart's poems praise the king's poetry, and mention aspects of court life in the 1580s like New Year's Day gifts, he did not have a salaried position in the household, leading to some critics to suggest the poet was not regularly present at the Scottish court. His father's 1569 will had recommended John to the care of Regent Moray to remain with him or the king, and a list of 25 gentleman pensioners appointed to attend the king riding and "passing to the fields" in May 1580 includes; "Johne Stewart brother of the Lord Innermeath".
