= Patrick Ruthven, 1st Earl of Forth =

Scottish peer, diplomat and professional soldier (1573–1651)

Earl of Forth and Brentford
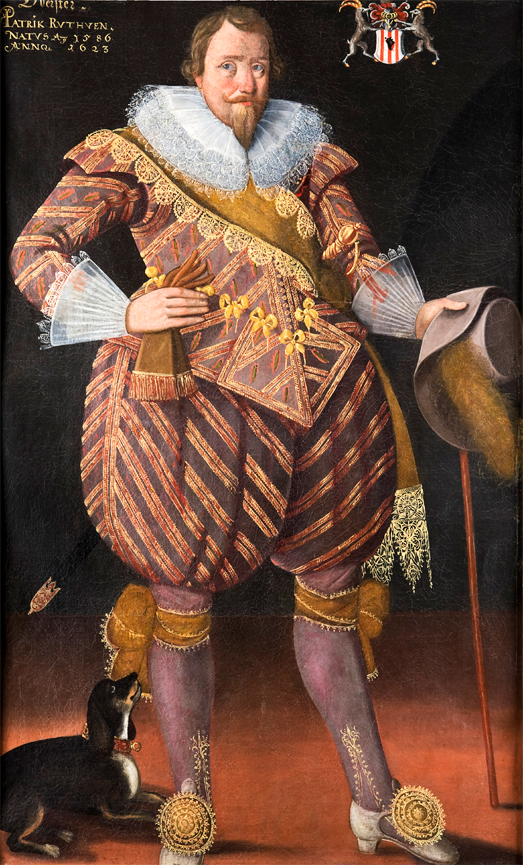
- Patrick Ruthven, portrait by Georg Günther Kräill von Bemeberg, 1623

Lord General of the Royalist Army
- In office 1642–1644

Governor of Edinburgh Castle
- In office 1638–1639

Governor of Ulm
- In office 1632–1632

Governor of Memel
- In office 1630–1631

Military Commandant of Malbork
- In office 1626–1629

Personal details
- Born: c. 1573 (Note: Generally accepted date, although his 1623 portrait (above) gives this as 1586) Ballindean, Perthshire
- Died: 2 February 1651 (aged 77) Buxtehude, Germany
- Spouse(s): (1) Unknown (2) Jean Henderson (3) Clara (1633-his death)
- Children: (2) Alexander (d. before 1649), Elspeth, Jean, and Christiana (3) Patrick (1648-1650), plus two others, also died young
- Parent(s): William Ruthven and Katherine Stewart
- Occupation: Professional soldier and diplomat

Military service
- Battles/wars: Polish–Swedish War (1600–1611); Ingrian War; Capture of Novgorod (1611); Siege of Pskov (1615); Polish–Swedish War (1621–1625); Siege of Riga (1621); Polish–Swedish War (1626–1629); Defence of Kalmar; Battle of Gniew; Battle of Dirschau; Thirty Years' War; Siege of Stralsund (1628); Capture of Landsberg; Breitenfeld; Nördlingen; Battle of Dömitz; War of the Three Kingdoms; Defence of Edinburgh Castle, 1640; Battle of Edgehill; Brentford; Siege of Gloucester (WIA); First Newbury (WIA); Battle of Cheriton; Cropredy Bridge; Battle of Lostwithiel; Second Newbury (WIA)

Patrick Ruthven, 1st Earl of Forth and Earl of Brentford (c. 1573 – 2 February 1651) was a professional soldier and diplomat from Perthshire in Scotland. He spent nearly 30 years in the Swedish army, reaching the rank of lieutenant general before returning home in 1637. During the War of the Three Kingdoms, he served as Lord General of the Royalist Army from 1642 to 1644, and later accompanied the future Charles II of England into exile.

He is thought to have died outside Buxtehude, Germany, in February 1651, and was buried nearby.

== Personal details ==
Patrick Ruthven was born between 1572 and 1573, (Note: His exact date of birth is unrecorded, but Swedish records note he reached the age of 60 in 1632, when he was appointed Governor of Ulm, suggesting 1572.) second son of William Ruthven (died 1603) of Ballindean, Perthshire, and Katherine Stewart. His father was a grandson of the 1st Lord Ruthven, and his mother a daughter of the 5th Lord Innermeath. His siblings included an elder brother, William Ruthven (1569–1634).

In 1600, the head of the Ruthven family, the 3rd Earl of Gowrie, became involved in the Gowrie conspiracy, an alleged plot to murder King James VI. He and his brother Alexander Ruthven were both killed, their estates confiscated, and the Ruthven name outlawed by the Parliament of Scotland. James continued to pursue the family even after this, one possible factor in why Patrick Ruthven and other relatives chose careers in foreign service.

Ruthven was married three times, although no details survive of his first. He had at least four children with his second wife Jean, a son Alexander (d. before 1649), (Note: Ruthven's will dated 9 May 1649 left property to Alexander's widow, Anna Erasma Klencke) and three daughters, Elspeth, Jean, and Christiana. He also had children with his third wife Clara Berner (died 1679), all of whom died young.

== Career ==
=== Swedish Service ===
In the first half of the 17th century, many Scots served with the Swedish army, and in 1609 Ruthven became one of the earliest recruits. His career began in the Polish–Swedish War (1600–1611), when he campaigned in Livonia under Charles IX of Sweden. The latter died in 1611, and was replaced by his son, Gustavus Adolphus, who continued his expansionist policies. During the Ingrian War with Russia, Ruthven took part in the fighting around Novograd, and Pskov.

In 1615, he returned to Scotland to enlist more recruits, and was appointed captain in Cockburn's regiment. He was colonel of the Småland Regiment when a new war with Poland began in 1621, his junior officers including Alexander Leslie and James King. His unit participated in the capture of Riga the same year. A victory that greatly enhanced Gustavus Adolphus's reputation within Protestant Europe, it also provided a vital bridgehead on the Baltic Sea, which Sweden retained until 1710.

In addition to his military duties, Ruthven's capacity for alcohol reportedly made him a useful negotiator, allegedly being known as "Pater Rotwein" (Note: Father Redwine) by his colleagues. When war with Poland broke out again in 1626, Ruthven took part in the defence of Kalmar, as well as the battles of Gniew and Dirschau. He was appointed military commandant of Malbork, and in September 1627 was one of four Scots colonels knighted by Gustavus Adolphus, the others being Alexander Leslie, David Drummond and John Hepburn.

Sweden entered the Thirty Years' War in 1628, when an expeditionary force led by Leslie was sent to defend Stralsund from an Imperial army. Ruthven became governor of Memel shortly before Gustavus Adolphus invaded the Holy Roman Empire in 1630.

His regiment took part in the April 1631 capture of Landsberg, and fought at Breitenfeld in September. When the Swedes pushed into Bavaria the following year, Ruthven was appointed Governor of Ulm, and given lands near Kirchberg in Franconia. However, he was now 60, an age Gustavus Adolphus allegedly considered too old for a field command, and Ruthven asked to be released from Swedish service, unsuccessfully asking the Duke of Hamilton to intervene on his behalf.

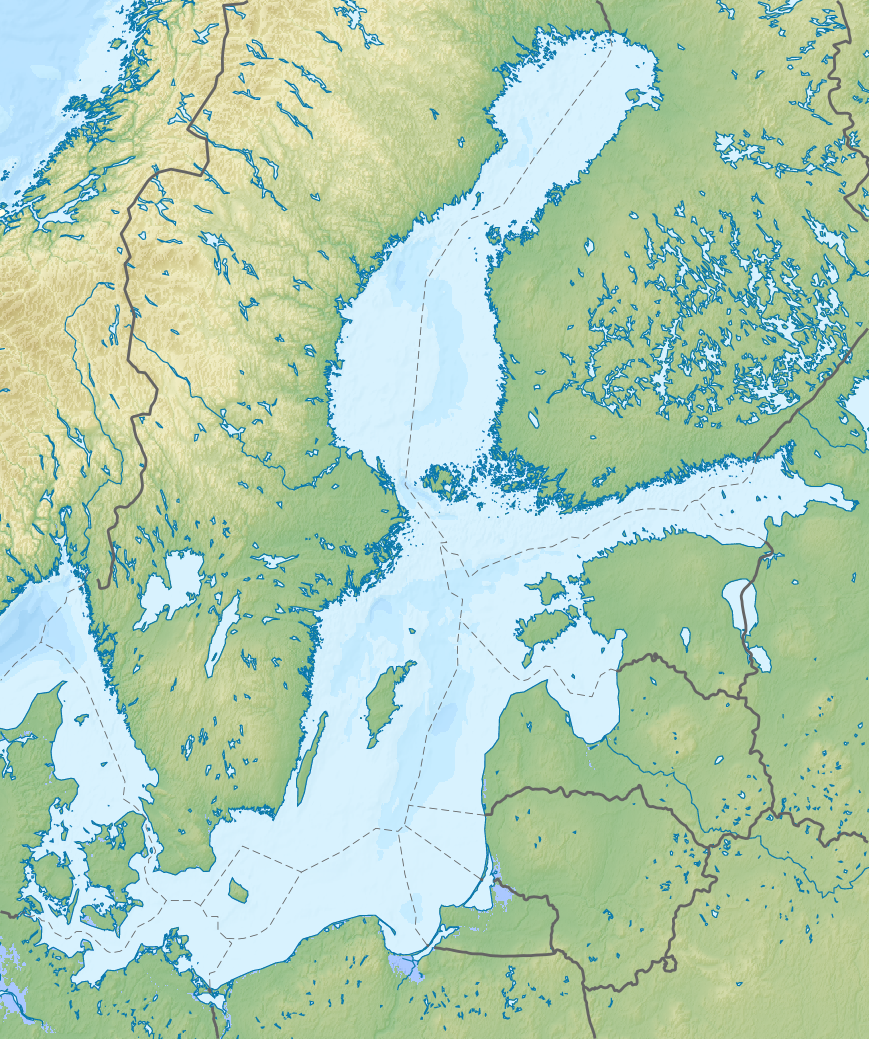
Patrick Ruthven - Baltic Campaigns 1609 to 1628; key locations in text

In November 1632, Gustavus Adolphus was killed in a hard-fought victory at Lützen, while defeat at Nördlingen in September 1634 forced the Swedes to retreat from Southern Germany, and temporarily threatened their entire position within the Empire. Ruthven joined the only remaining Swedish field army, commanded by Johan Banér, and spent the 1634 and 1635 campaigning along the Rhine. In October 1635, he routed a Saxon force at Dömitz, but later fell out with Banér. He was finally allowed to return home by Queen Christina in June 1637.

=== Wars of the Three Kingdoms ===
As the struggle over religious practice and royal authority intensified between Charles I and his Scottish opponents, both sides began preparing for a possible civil war. In December 1637, Charles made Ruthven Muster Master General for Scotland, and in 1639 appointed him Governor of Edinburgh Castle. The outbreak of the Bishops' Wars in March prevented him taking up this position, while he turned down command of the Scottish Royalists, as he was made subordinate to his less experienced social superiors. The First Bishops' War ended in June with the Treaty of Berwick, but was seen as only a temporary pause in hostilities.

Ruthven was finally able to enter Edinburgh Castle in November 1639, the garrison containing a number of experienced Scots officers who had served in Germany, including his son Alexander. When the Second Bishops' War began in April 1640, they held out until September, when forced to surrender by starvation. One of the few bright spots in a disastrous war for Charles I, the right to use the Ruthven name was restored to the Ballindean branch of the family in May 1641, while Ruthven was made "Earl of Forth" in March 1642.

When the First English Civil War broke out in August 1642, Ruthven was appointed Marshal General of the Royalist forces. On the eve of the Battle of Edgehill in October, he had a furious row over how to arrange the army with his immediate superior, the Earl of Lindsey. Lindsey resigned, and later died of wounds received fighting with his regiment, while Ruthven was appointed Lord General in his place. In the subsequent Battle of Brentford, a brigade led by Ruthven stormed the town, but the Royalists failed to take London after being repulsed at Turnham Green, and withdrew to Oxford.

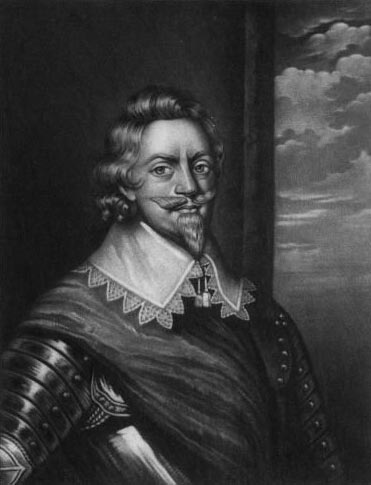
Ruthven as the newly created Earl of Forth, c. 1642

As Lord General, Ruthven acted as Charles' Chief of Staff, and played an active role, being wounded at the Siege of Gloucester and First Battle of Newbury in 1643. He informally commanded the Royalist army at Cheriton in March 1644, a defeat that ended hopes of retaking South-East England from Parliament. Although largely caused by the indiscipline of his subordinates, this impacted his reputation at court, especially given the increasing prominence of younger, more aggressive leaders like Charles' nephew, Prince Rupert of the Rhine. Ruthven was also showing signs of age, Royalist statesman Clarendon later noting that while "a man of unquestionable courage and integrity", by 1644 he "was much decayed in his parts, and with long...immoderate drinking, dozed in his understanding...".

At 72, Ruthven himself recognised he was too old for active service, and in May 1644 he was created Earl of Brentford in the Peerage of England. However, in early 1644, Charles ordered Prince Rupert to relieve York, an expedition that ended in defeat at Marston Moor on 2 July. In his absence, Ruthven played a key role in the Royalist campaign in Western England, beating off one Parliamentarian army at Cropredy Bridge in June, then trapping another at Lostwithiel in September, arguably the most comprehensive Royalist victory of the war. Returning to Oxford, he was wounded at Second Newbury on 27 October, and on 6 November resigned his position in favour of Prince Rupert.

=== Exile and death ===
The Prince of Wales, later Charles II, was given command of Western England in March 1645, and Ruthven appointed his Lord Chamberlain. By early 1646, the Royalists were on the verge of defeat, and when the prince went into exile, Ruthven accompanied him. Following the Execution of Charles I in January 1649, he and his old comrade James King used their contacts in Sweden to secure arms and recruits for Royalist uprisings in Scotland and Ireland. This included a landing in the Orkney Islands by Montrose, which was abandoned after Charles II agreed the Treaty of Breda with the Covenanter government. Despite being barred from returning home by Parliament, Ruthven accompanied Charles II to Scotland in summer 1650.

Some sources suggest he died in Dundee on 2 February 1651, and was buried in the parish church of Monifieth. If so, there is no trace of the original monument, since it was completely rebuilt in 1812, although a plaque commemorating Ruthven was later installed. However, Swedish records suggest he had returned to Stockholm by January 1651, and was traveling to Copenhagen when he died at Buxtehude, just outside Hamburg, and taken to a nearby monastery for burial. While his body may have been transported to Scotland at a later date, this seems unlikely, and it has been suggested he was confused with one of his many relatives.

Ruthven died deeply in debt, involving his wife and daughters in lengthy legal disputes. Since he had no surviving direct male heirs, his titles became extinct.

== Sources ==
- Barratt, John (2004). Cavalier Generals: King Charles I and His Commanders during the English Civil War 1642–46. Leo Cooper. ISBN 978-1844151288.
- Berg, Jonas; Lagercrantz, Bo. "Scots in Sweden – Seventeenth Century – Part 1". electricscotland.com.
- Clarendon, Edward, Earl of (1888). Macray, W. Dunn (ed.). The History of the Rebellion and Civil Wars in England begun in the year 1641. Vol. 3. Clarendon Press.
- Frost, Robert (2000). The Northern Wars; War, State and Society in Northeastern Europe 1558-1721. Longman. ISBN 978-058206429-4.
- Harris, Tim (2014). Rebellion: Britain's First Stuart Kings, 1567-1642 (2015 ed.). OUP. ISBN 978-0198743118.
- Kamen, Henry (2003). Spain's Road to Empire. Allen Lane. ISBN 978-0-14-028528-4.
- Reid, Stuart (2008). "Ruthven, Patrick, earl of Forth and earl of Brentford (died 1651)". Oxford Dictionary of National Biography (online ed.). Oxford University Press. doi:10.1093/ref:odnb/24373. (Subscription, Wikipedia Library access or UK public library membership required.)
- Macray, William Dunn, ed. (1898). Ruthven Correspondence: Letters and Papers of Patrick Ruthven, Earl of Forth and Brentford, and of His Family: A. D. 1615 – A. D. 1662. With an Appendix of Papers Relating to Sir John Urry (2023 ed.). Legare Street Press. ISBN 978-1019539125.
- Malcolm, J (1910). The Parish of Monifieth in Ancient and Modern Times. Edinburgh Press.
- Murdoch, Steve; Zickermann, Kathrin (2007). "Major General Patrick Moore of Buxtehude: A Scottish Officer in 'Swedish Bremen'". Friends of Perth and Kinross Council Archive. 21: 8–10.
- Pearce, Dominic (2015). Henrietta Maria. Amberley. ISBN 978-1-4456-4555-1.
- Murdoch, Steve; Grosjean, Alexia (2014). Alexander Leslie and the Scottish Generals of the Thirty Years' War, 1618-1648. Routledge. ISBN 978-1848934672.
- Murdoch, Steve; Grosjean, Alexia. "RUTHVEN, PATRICK [SSNE 3413]". University of St Andrews - Institute of Scottish Historical Research.
- Royle, Trevor (2004). The Wars of the Three Kingdoms, 1638–1660. Palgrave MacMillan. ISBN 0-312-29293-7.
- Scally, John (2024). The Polar Star - James, First Duke of Hamilton (1606-1649). Ubiquity Press. ISBN 978-1914481406.

Peerage of Scotland
New creation	Earl of Forth; 1642–1651	Extinct
New creation	Lord Ruthven of Ettrick; 1639–1642	Succeeded by Alexander Ruthven
Peerage of England
New creation	Earl of Brentford; 1644–1651	Extinct
