= John Stewart, 1st Earl of Atholl (1566–1603) =

Scottish nobleman (1566–1603)

John Stewart, 1st Earl of Atholl (1566-1603) was a Scottish landowner. He was the sixth Lord Innermeath and was made Earl of Atholl in 1596.

His parents were James Stewart, 5th Lord Innermeath and Helen Ogilvy, a daughter of James Ogilvy, Lord Airlie, and Helen Sinclair. His uncle was the court poet, John Stewart of Baldynneis.

In 1580, John Stewart married Margaret Lindsay, the daughter of David Lindsay, 9th Earl of Crawford and Katherine Campbell.

In February 1592 his brother Robert Stewart had been a servant of their kinsman, the young James Stewart, 2nd Earl of Moray. In March 1592, in retribution, Robert stole a trunk of money belonging to George Gordon, then Earl of Huntly, and twice tried to assassinate him by entering his house in disguise armed with a pistol.

== Earl of Atholl ==
In March 1596, he married, secondly, Marie Ruthven, the widow of John Stewart, 5th Earl of Atholl, and a friend of Anne of Denmark. She was a daughter of William Ruthven, 1st Earl of Gowrie and Dorothea Stewart. He was newly created Earl of Atholl at Holyrood Palace on 25 March, after Marie Ruthven had bought back the rights to the earldom for £10,000 Scots. The king knighted five of his followers as part of the ceremony.

There had been competition for the Earldom from Lord Ochiltree, and Esmé Stewart the brother of the Duke Lennox. The English diplomat George Nicholson heard that the Countess of Atholl had made an alternative plan to have her daughters marry the Earl of Moray and his younger brother Francis Stewart, and so the Earl of Moray would also be Earl of Atholl, and the brother become Earl of Moray.

In April 1597 he wrote from Blair Atholl to Ogilvy of Inverquharity mentioning a previous meeting with the Ogilvy family at Cupar to discuss their business with the Laird of Balfour, and suggesting a meet-up at Blair or Dunkeld.

In November 1597, Atholl and Marie Ruthven armed their followers and marched to the House of Moircleuch and besieged Walter Leslie, and brought him back to Blair Atholl and imprisoned him. Around this time he and his followers attacked Andrew Spalding at Ashintully Castle in Strathardle, bringing great guns, hagbuts, and pistols and raising fire at his house.

Marie Ruthven and Atholl arrested Agnes McCawis and Bessie Ireland as suspected witches. The two women accused two more women from Dunkeld of witchcraft, Margaret Stewart and Isobel Douglas, who complained in 1598 of their unjust imprisonment to the Privy Council of Scotland. Marie Ruthven and the Earl were ordered to bring the four women to Edinburgh. According to the Chronicle of Perth, Bessie Ireland, Jonet Robertson, and Marion McCauss were burnt on the South Inch on 9 September 1597.

John Stewart died in 1603. The next earl was his son from his first marriage, James Stewart, 2nd Earl of Atholl (died 1625).

In October 1603 his widow Marie Ruthven wrote to Lord Cecil from Dunkeld asking for his help in her lawsuits. In 1605 she was in litigation with the new earl.

Peerage of Scotland
New creation	Earl of Atholl; 9th creation 1596–1603	Succeeded by James Stewart
Preceded by James Stewart	Lord Innermeath; 1585–1603	Succeeded by James Stewart
