= Archibald Campbell, 5th Earl of Argyll =

Scottish nobleman, peer, and politician

Archibald Campbell
- 5th Earl of Argyll
- Tenure: 1558—1573
- Born: c. 1532
- Buried: Kilmun Parish Church
- Wars and battles: Battle of Langside
- Noble family: Campbell
- Spouses: Lady Jean Stewart; Janet Cunningham
- Issue: Stillborn son
- Parents: Archibald Campbell, 4th Earl of Argyll; Lady Helen Hamilton

Archibald Campbell, 5th Earl of Argyll (1532/1537 – 12 September 1573) was a Scottish nobleman, peer, and politician. He was one of the leading figures in the politics of Scotland during the reign of Mary, Queen of Scots, and the early part of that of James VI.

== Rise to prominence ==
Succeeding his father Archibald Campbell, 4th Earl of Argyll (c. 1507–1558) in the earldom in 1558, Argyll's inheritance made him one of the most powerful magnates in the kingdom. A devout Protestant, he along with his brother-in-law, Lord James Stewart, illegitimate son of James V of Scotland, became an adherent of John Knox about 1556. Like his father he was one of the most influential members of the party of religious reform, signing what was probably the first "godly band" in December 1557, and Argyll soon became one of the leaders of the Lords of the Congregation. Together, Argyll and Stewart negotiated with Sir William Cecil to secure English aid against the regent, Mary of Guise, by the Treaty of Berwick, and were largely responsible for the negotiation of the Treaty of Edinburgh in 1560, which saw the triumph of the Congregation and the withdrawal of French and English troops from Scotland. It was about this time that Cecil referred to Argyll as "a goodly gentleman universally honoured of all Scotland."

== Influences of national events ==
=== Mary's court ===
With the young queen's return to Scotland in 1561, Argyll and Stewart, now Earl of Moray, retained their leading roles in the kingdom, continuing to pursue an anglophilic policy, and Argyll was separated from the party of Knox. Mary, Queen of Scots, and Moray came to Castle Campbell in January 1563 to celebrate the marriage of his sister, Margaret Campbell, to James Stewart, 1st Lord Doune. Her courtiers put on a masque, dressed as shepherds.

Mary and her court wore Highland clothes for a visit to Argyll and Inveraray in 1563. Mary wore a "marvellous fair" costume which had been a gift from Agnes Campbell the wife of James MacConel or MacDonald of Dunyvaig.

=== Chaseabout raid ===
The Earl of Argyll was said to be an opponent of the planned wedding of Mary, Queen of Scots, and Henry, Lord Darnley. It was said that Argyll was a leader of a plot to kidnap Mary and Henry Stuart, Lord Darnley in June 1565 as they travelled between Perth and Edinburgh. They would be imprisoned in Lochleven Castle or Castle Campbell. According to Adam Blackwood the plot failed while the other conspirators were waiting for Argyll, when the Laird of Dowhill gave Mary a warning. The English diplomat Thomas Randolph said that Argyll came towards Kinross hoping to meet Mary, but only to join her for a discussion over dinner.

The Argyll's pre-eminence at court came to an end in 1565, with the queen's marriage to Darnley, whose claims to the English throne did not endear him to Elizabeth I of England, leading Argyll, the Earl of Moray, and other Protestant leaders to rise in a revolt, now known as the "Chaseabout Raid". When the English failed to help their Scottish allies, Argyll, alone of the rebels, was able to remain in the Kingdom, due to his very strong position in the Highlands. The failure of the English to come to the aid of his party led to the beginning of Argyll's disillusionment with his previous Anglophilic policy.

=== Mary at Lochleven ===
Argyll can be connected to the assassinations of David Rizzio in 1566 and of Henry Stuart, Lord Darnley in 1567. Although supposed to be a signatory of the Ainslie Tavern Bond, Argyll was horrified by the Queen's marriage to James Hepburn, 4th Earl of Bothwell. He joined with Moray and other Protestant leaders in fighting Mary and Bothwell in that year, leading to the capture of the queen at Carberry Hill, but broke with his former allies over the question of deposing the queen.

=== Offices held and military involvement ===
With Mary's escape from prison in 1568, Argyll became the leader of the Queen's Party, and led Mary's army in the defeat at Langside in which he showed little military skill. He continued to champion the queen's cause following her flight to England. According to the chronicle known as the Diurnal of Occurrents, Argll attended a meeting of the nobility at Dalkeith Palace in February 1570, where the potential homecoming of Mary, Queen of Scots, was discussed. Argyll made the English ambassador Thomas Randolph unwelcome, accusing him of sowing discord in Scotland.

Argyll reconciled with Regent Lennox in 1571, and lent his support to the King's party, as a means of restoring peace and lessening English meddling in Scottish affairs. He was appointed to the Privy Council that year, and became Lord Chancellor of Scotland in 1572.

== Role in Ulster politics ==
Argyll, in his role as Campbell clan chief, was also heavily involved in the politics of Ulster during the 1560s. Although he initially hoped for an alliance with the English to secure his claims on land possessed by the O'Donnell and Sorley Boy MacDonnell families against the encroachment of the O'Neill, English unwillingness to work with him led him to ally with Shane O'Neill, and orchestrate a marriage alliance among the three feuding clans of Ulster, which would ultimately have major effects on Irish history with the eruption of the Hugh O'Neill rebellion in the 1590s.

In February 1569, an English official, Nicholas White, visited Mary, Queen of Scots, at Tutbury Castle. They mentioned that he was going to Ireland, and White said that the chiefest troubles of Ireland proceed from the north of Scotland, through the Earl of Argyll's "supportation". Mary did not give him much of an answer.

== Marriages and death ==
He first married Lady Jean Stewart (died 1588), daughter of James V of Scotland and Elizabeth Bethune; he was thus half-brother-in-law to Mary and to Moray. After divorcing Jean Stewart, Argyll married Janet Cunningham, daughter of the Earl of Glencairn in August 1573. Janet Cunningham gave birth to the Earl's stillborn posthumous son in June 1574. She subsequently married Humphrey Colquhoun of Luss and died in 1585.

Argyll died in September 1573, without male issue, and was buried at Kilmun Parish Church. He was succeeded by his half-brother Colin.

Legal offices
Preceded by 4th Earl of Argyll	Lord Justice General; 1558–1573	Succeeded by 6th Earl of Argyll
Political offices
Preceded by 4th Earl of Morton	Lord Chancellor of Scotland; 1572–1573	Succeeded by 8th Lord Glamis
Peerage of Scotland
Preceded by Archibald Campbell	Earl of Argyll; 1558–1573	Succeeded by Colin Campbell
