= Dömitz Fortress =

- Festung Dömitz
- Dömitz, Mecklenburg-Vorpommern, Germany
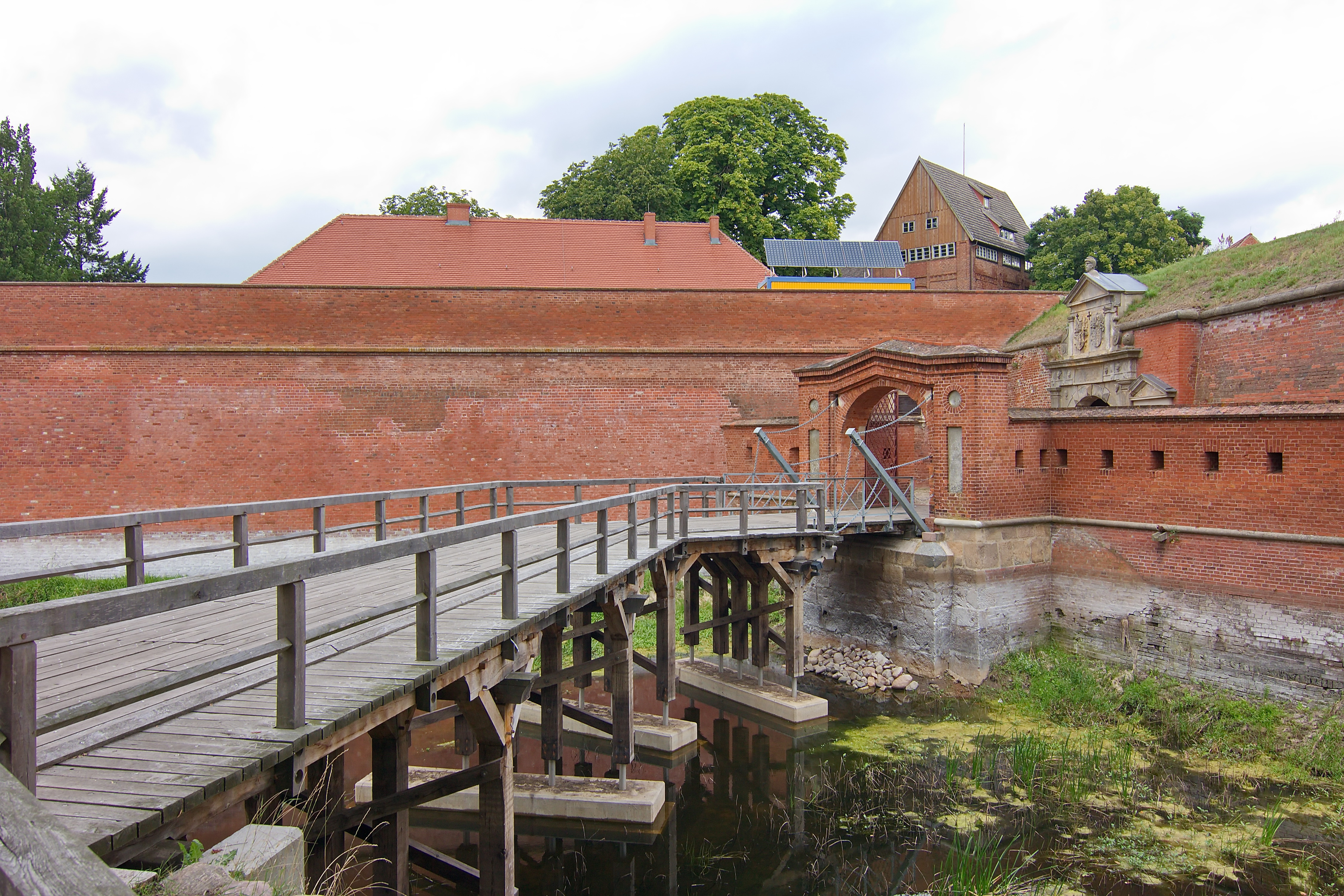
- Main entrance into the fort

Site information
- Type: pentagonal bastion fort
- Open to the public: Yes
- Condition: Intact
- Website: www.festung-doemitz-museum.de

Location
- Coordinates: 53°8′32″N 11°14′44″E

Site history
- Built: 1559–1565
- Built by: Duchy of Mecklenburg-Güstrow
- In use: 1565–1894
- Materials: Brick and sandstone
- Battles/wars: Thirty Years' War; Napoleonic Wars

The Dömitz Fortress (German: Festung Dömitz) is a bastion fort in Dömitz, Mecklenburg-Vorpommern, Germany. It was built by John Albert I, Duke of Mecklenburg-Güstrow, between 1559 and 1565, to secure Mecklenburg's border. The fort saw use during the Thirty Years' War and the Napoleonic Wars, and it was decommissioned in 1894. The fort is now in good condition, and it has been a museum since 1953. It is one of the few well-preserved 16th-century flatland forts in Northern Europe.

== History ==
The Dömitz Fortress was built between 1559 and 1565 on the orders of John Albert I, Duke of Mecklenburg. It was built on the site of an older fort, which had been built in the 13th century. The fort was one of the strongest in the area, and it was able to secure Mecklenburg's border on the Elbe River. The fort was designed by the Italian military engineer Francesco a Bornau, who also designed the fortifications of the Schwerin Palace.

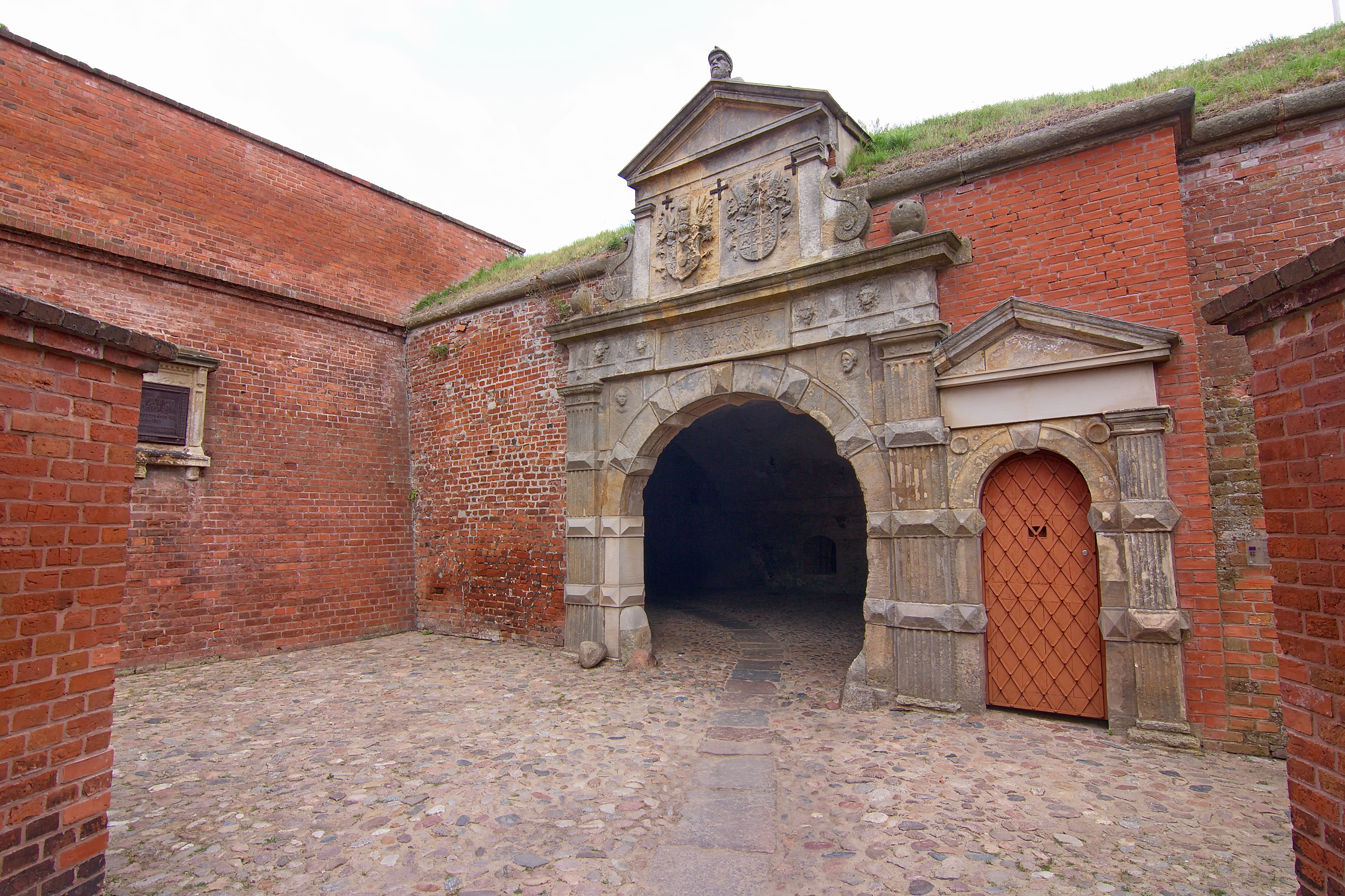
The main gate of Dömitz Fortress

Like many other examples of military architecture, the fort was designed with functionality rather than aesthetics in mind, and the only part of the structure which is ornate is its main gate, which is built out of sandstone. The gate is decorated with several carved reliefs, including the coats of arms of Mecklenburg and Brandenburg. The following inscription is written on the gate:

IOANNES ALBERTVS

DVX MEGAPOL SIBI
SVISQVE COMMVNIVIT
ANNO M D LXV

(meaning Erected by Johann Albrecht Duke of Mecklenburg for him and his in 1565)

The fort saw use during the Thirty Years' War, and was burnt during the Battle of Dömitz in 1635. The fort and town were bombarded and occupied by French and Dutch troops during the Napoleonic Wars. After 1705, the fort was also used as a prison and a madhouse.

When the Dömitz Fortress was built, it served as a citadel, and the rest of Dömitz was enclosed in walls in the form of a priests cap. The fort was altered a number of times over the centuries. The only original building within the fort is the Kommandantenhaus (Commander's House), since all other structures were demolished and rebuilt at some point. Its main gate was restored between 1851 and 1865.

The Dömitz Fortress became obsolete with the unification of the German Empire in 1871, and it was decommissioned by the military in 1894. The fort was used for a number of purposes, until it was decided to restore it for tourism purposes in 1934. The fort was used as an air raid shelter during World War II, and the buildings inside housed refugees in the years following the war.

Since 1953, the fort has been a museum, known as Museum Festung Dömitz. It was added to the list of protected landmarks in 1975, and it was restored for a third time between 2001 and 2007, as part of the ERDF-financed Baltic Fort Route project. Throughout the course of restoration, the main gate was cleaned and desalinated, some structural elements were removed and reattached, and measures were taken to reduce action of moisture on the fort.

== Layout ==
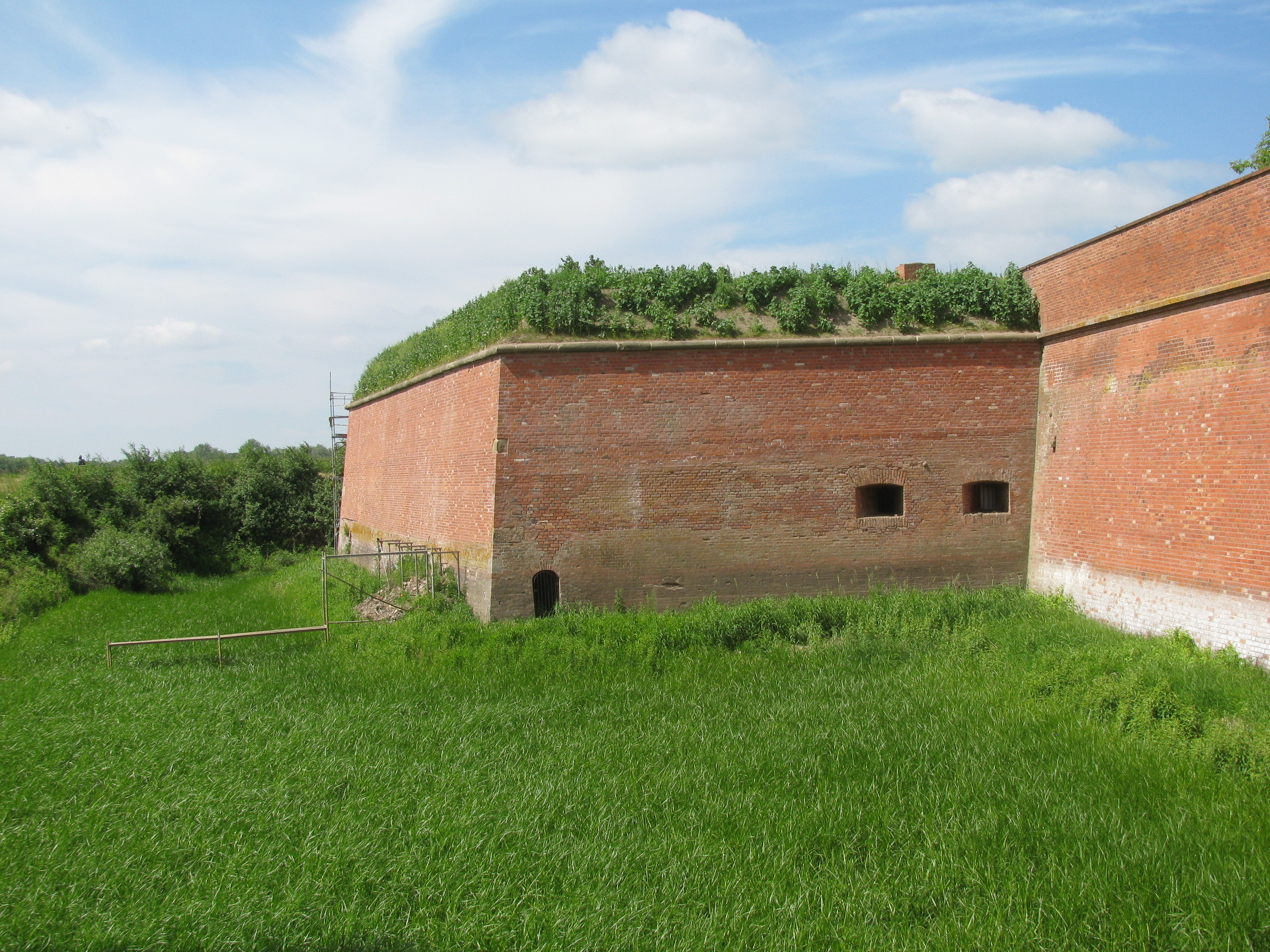
Held Bastion

The Dömitz Fortress is a pentagonal bastion fort, having five bastions containing casemates. The bastions are known as:

- Cavalier Bastion
- Held Bastion
- Drache Bastion
- Greif Bastion
- Burg Bastion

It is surrounded by a ditch, a counterscarp, a covertway and a glacis.
