= Dömitz =

Town in Mecklenburg-Vorpommern, Germany

- Town
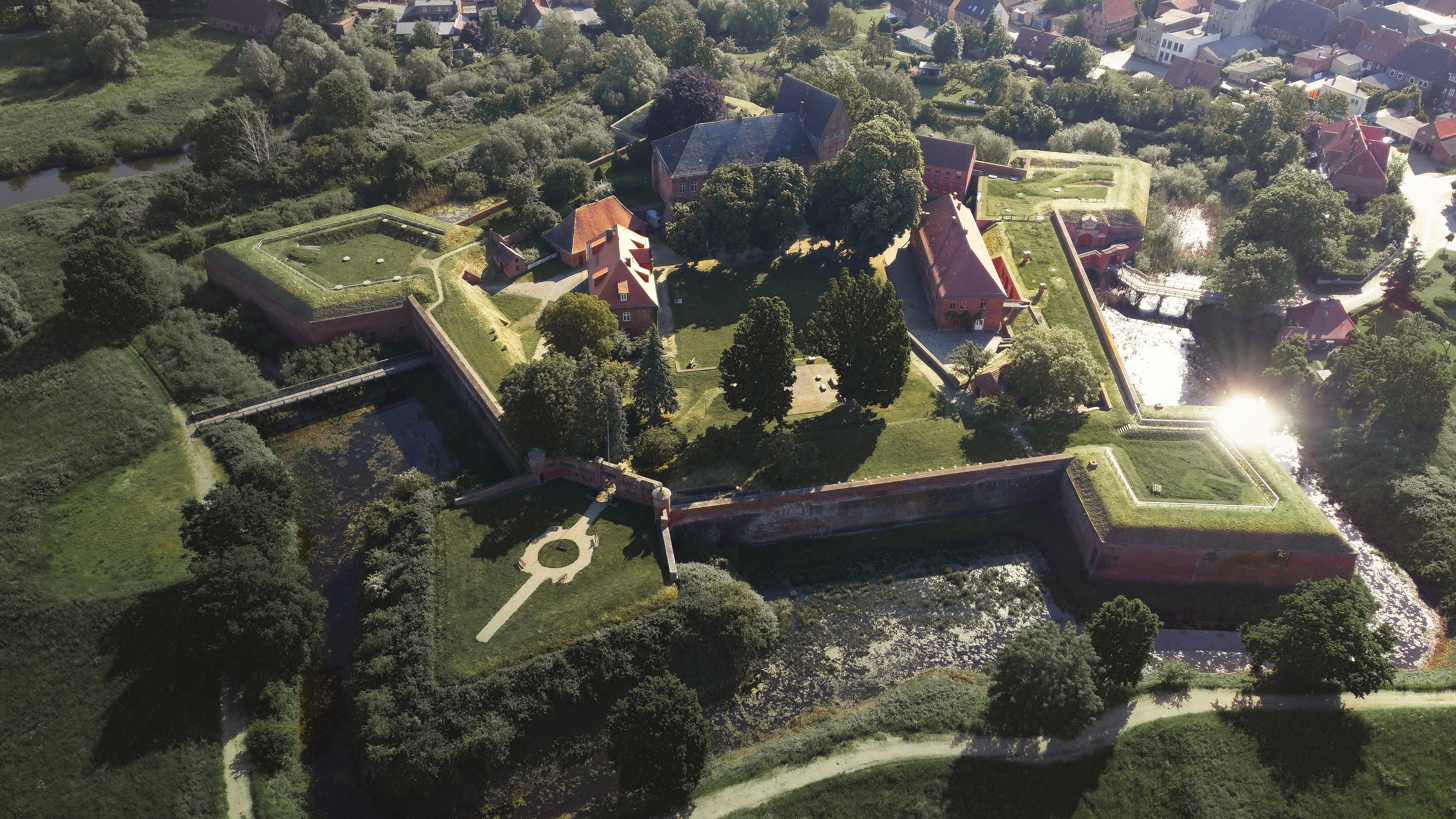
- Dömitz Fortress

- Flag Coat of arms

- Location of Dömitz within Ludwigslust-Parchim district
- Interactive map of Dömitz
- Location within Germany Location within Mecklenburg-Vorpommern
- Coordinates: 53°08′18″N 11°15′48″E
- Country: Germany
- State: Mecklenburg-Vorpommern
- District: Ludwigslust-Parchim
- Municipal assoc.: Dömitz-Malliß

Government
  - Mayor: Renate Vollbrecht

Area
  - Total: 60.58 km^{2} (23.39 sq mi)
- Elevation: 15 m (49 ft)

Population (2025-12-31)
  - Total: 2,793
  - Density: 46.10/km^{2} (119.4/sq mi)
- Time zone: UTC+01:00 (CET)
  - Summer (DST): UTC+02:00 (CEST)
- Postal codes: 19303
- Dialling codes: 038758
- Vehicle registration: LWL
- Website: www.doemitz.de

Dömitz (German pronunciation: [ˈdøːmɪts]) is a town in the Ludwigslust-Parchim district, in Mecklenburg-Western Pomerania, Germany. It is situated on the right bank of the Elbe, 25 km southwest of Ludwigslust, and 37 km northwest of Wittenberge.

It was granted town rights by the counts of Dannenberg in the 13th century. In the 16th century, the Dömitz Fortress was built.

== Pictures ==
Timber framing

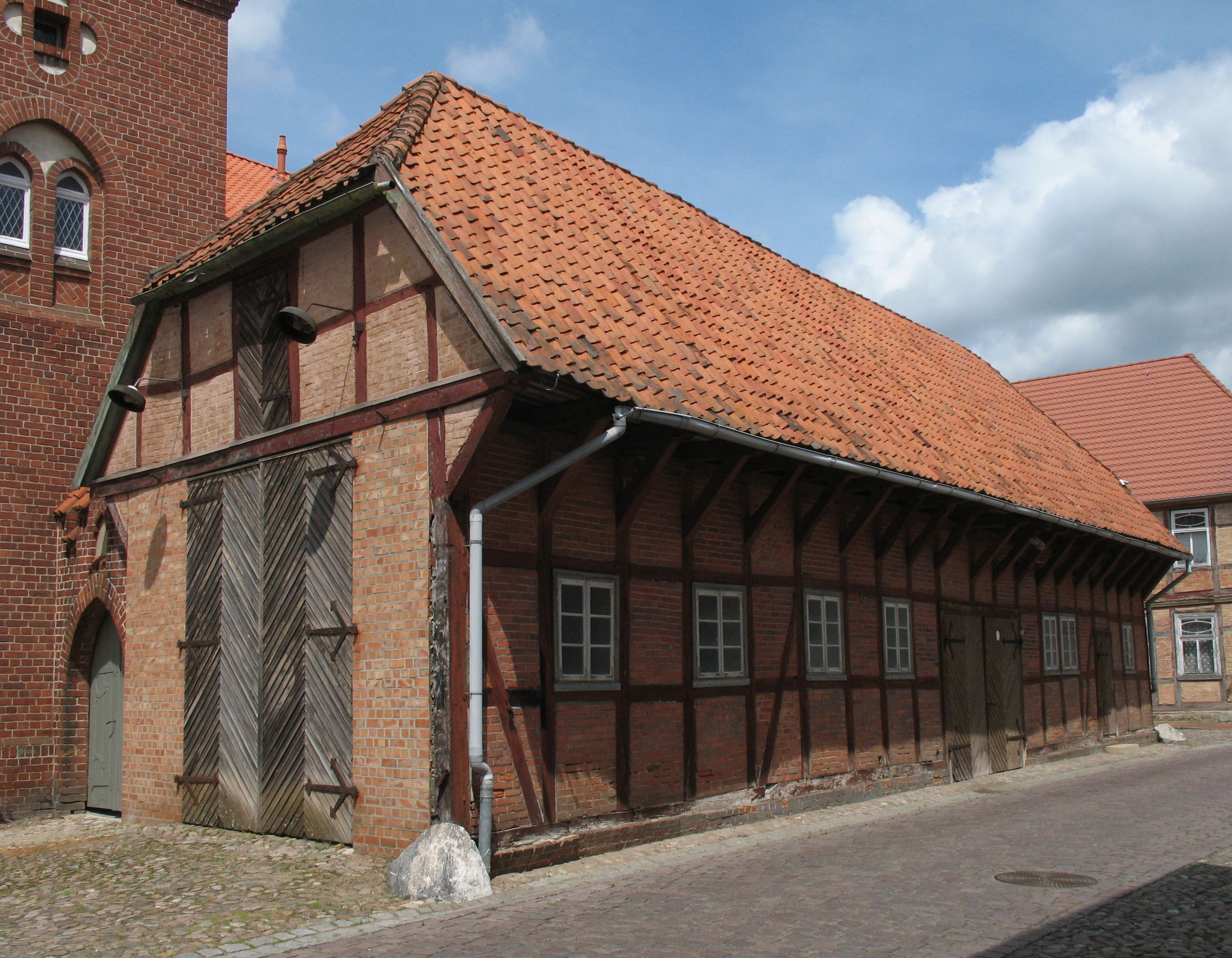

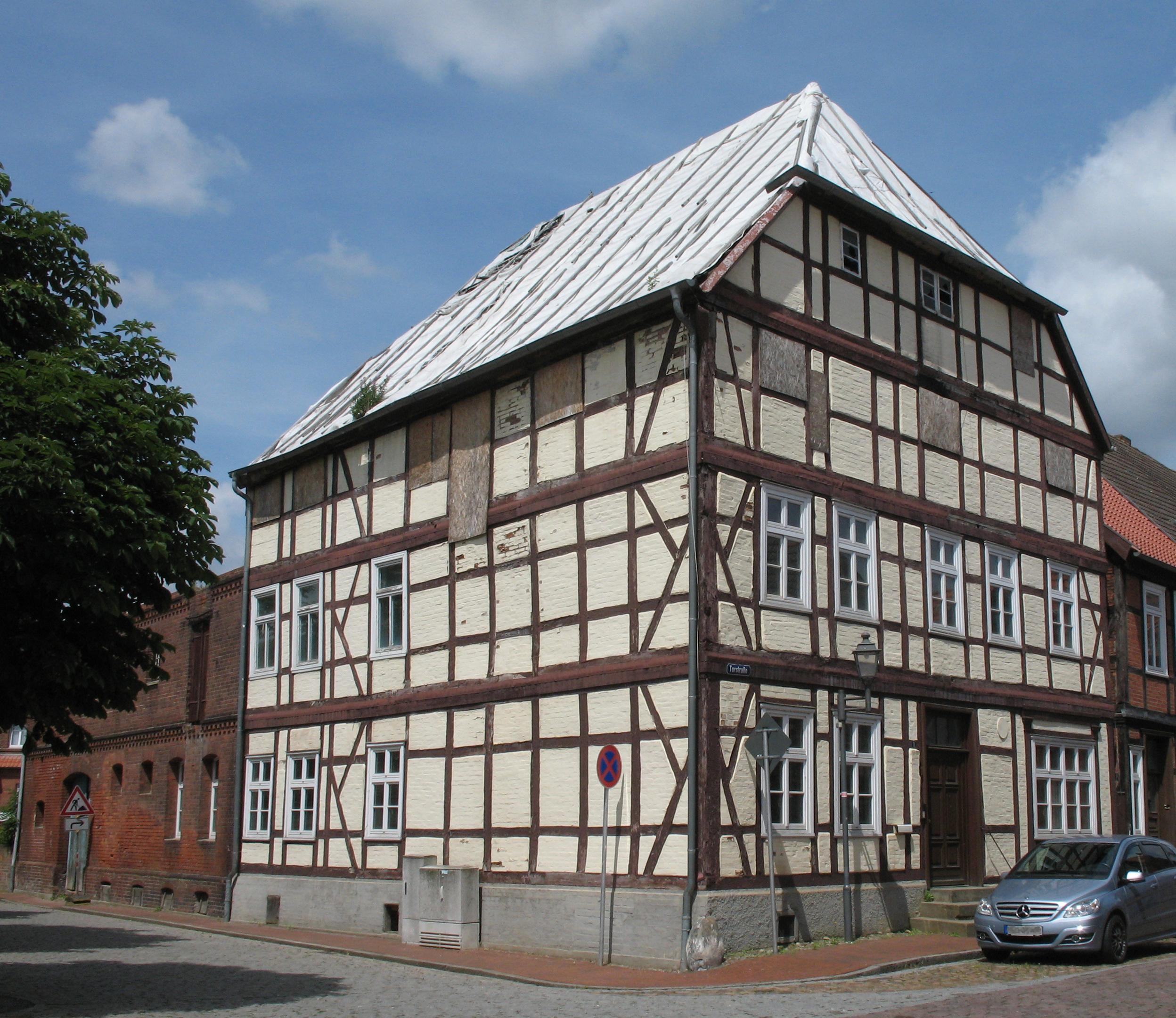
Torstraße

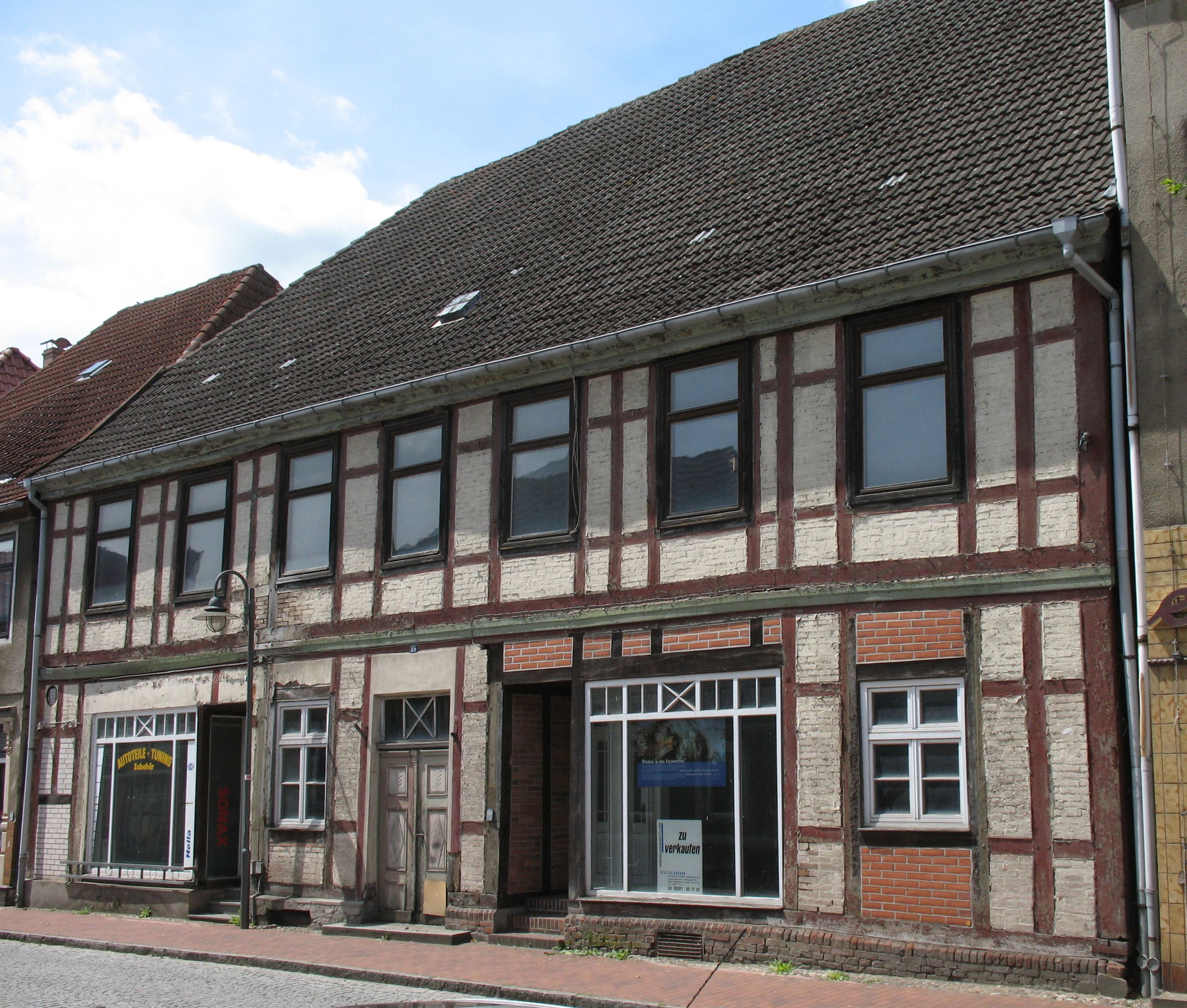

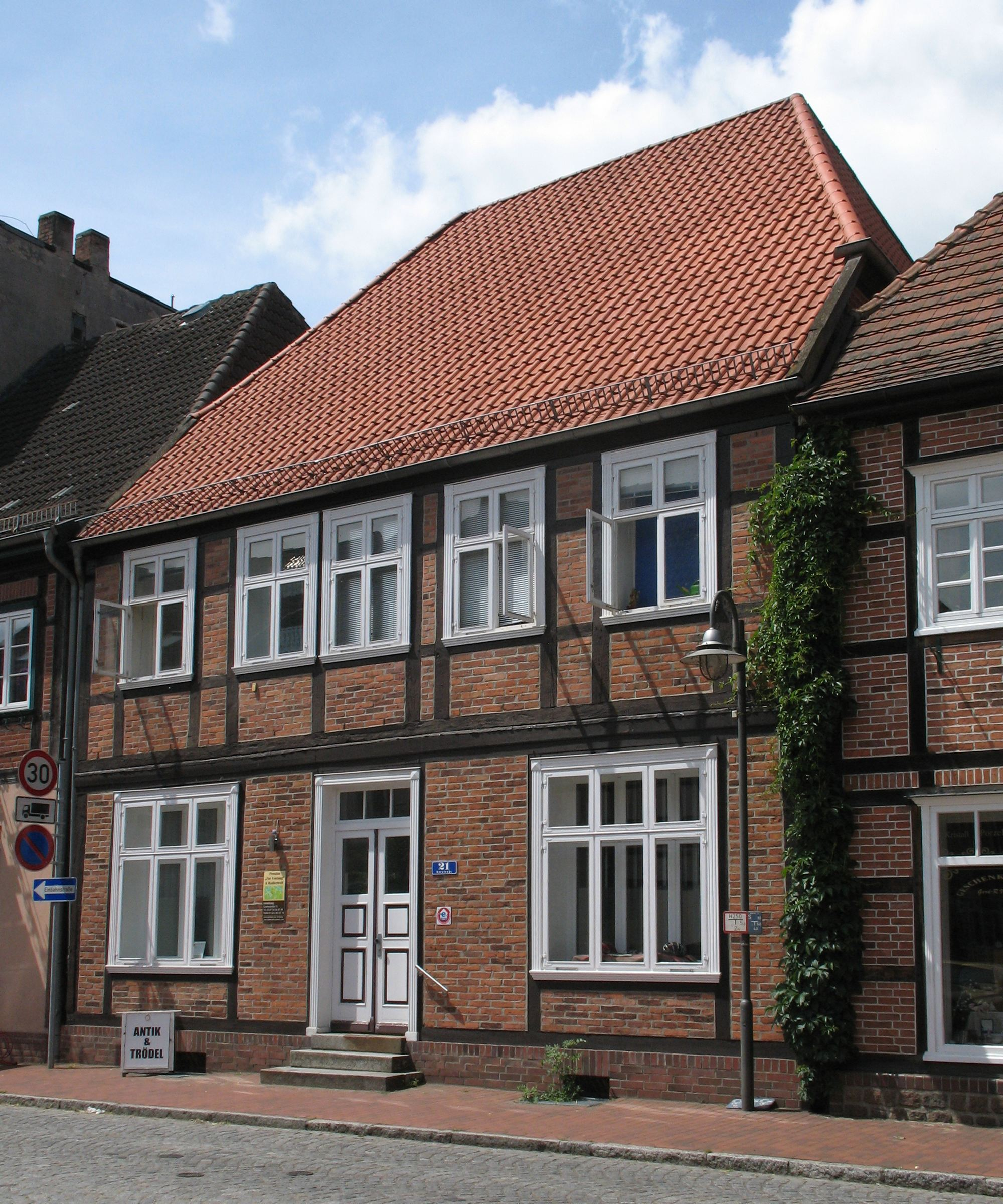

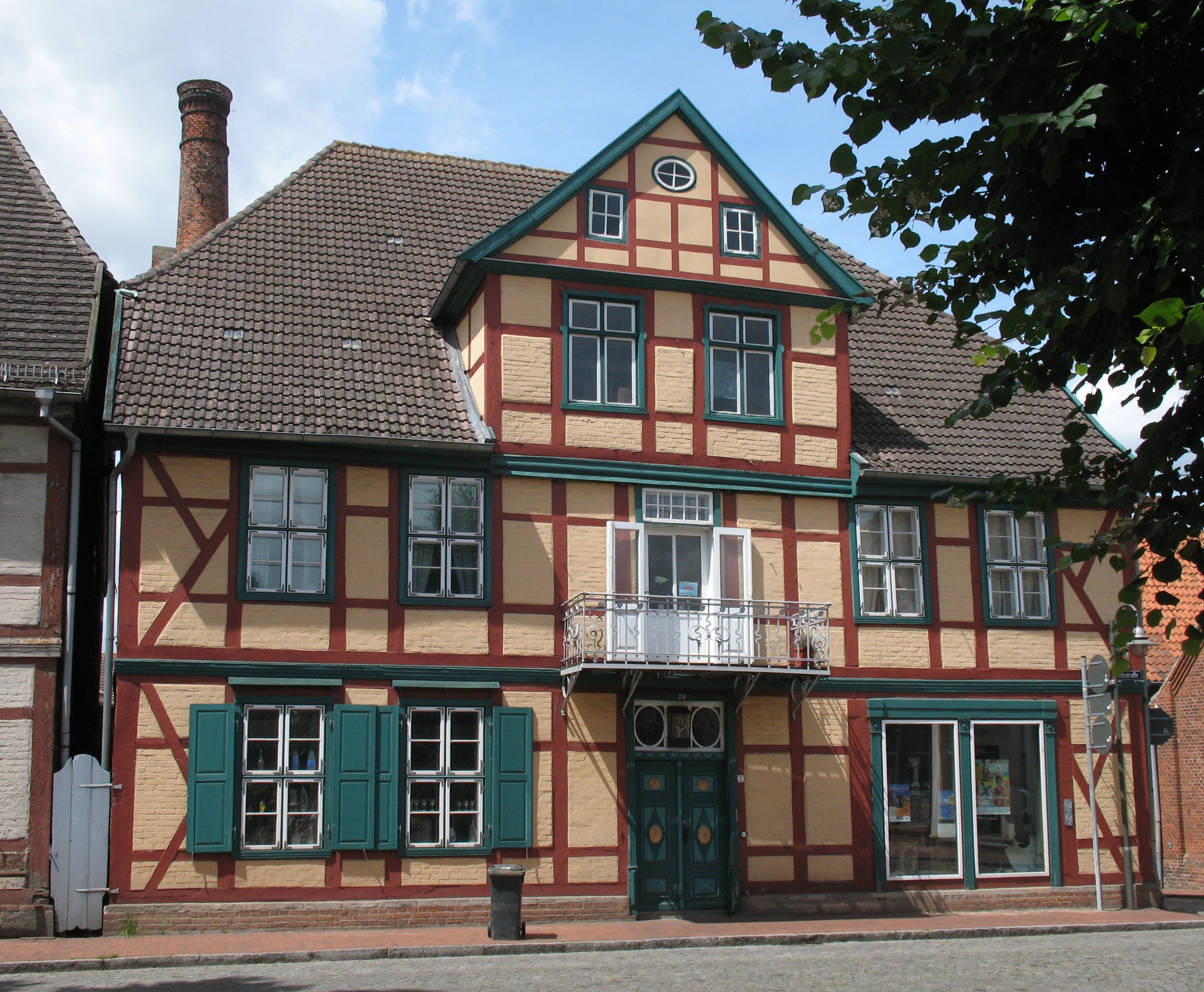

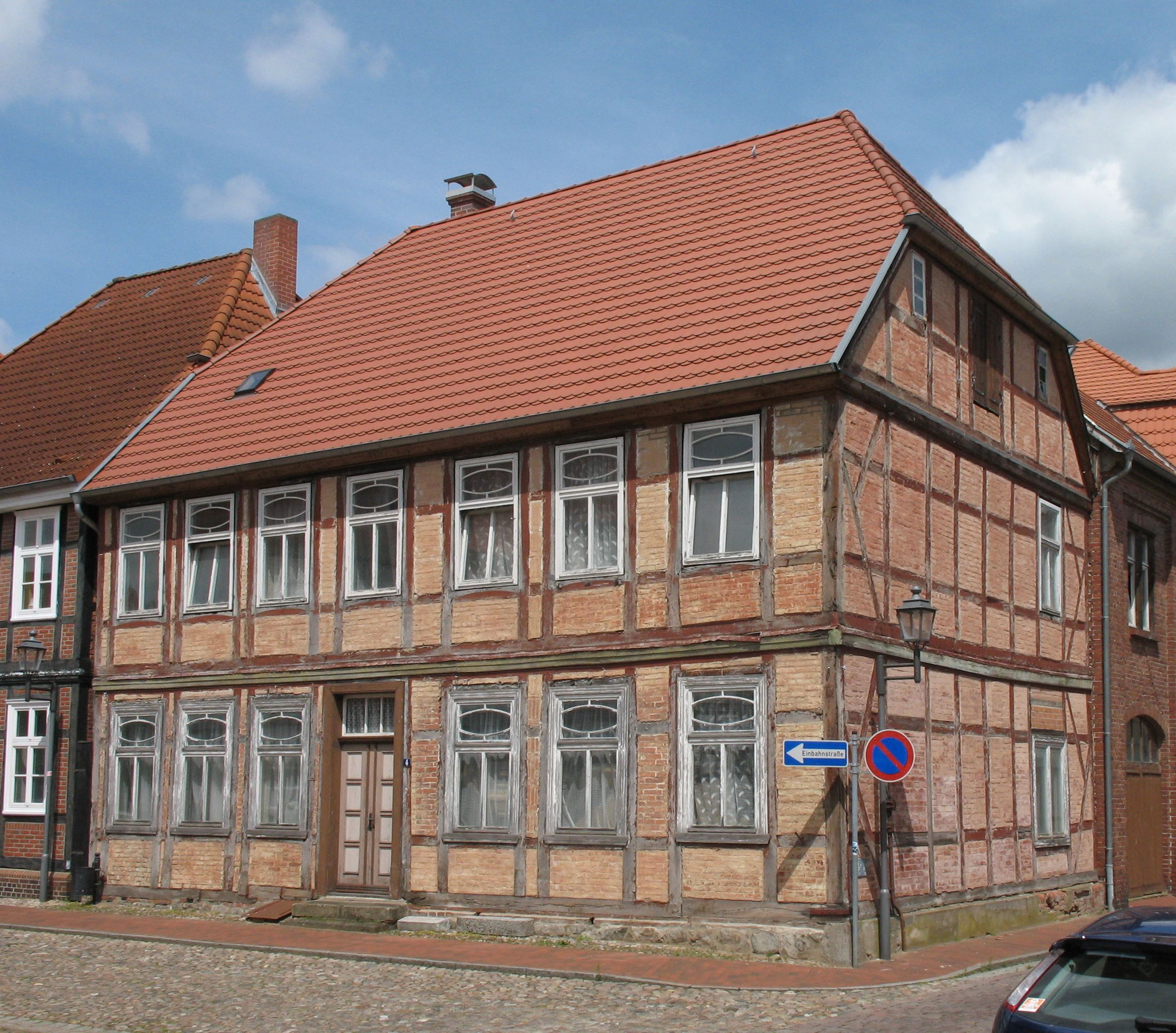
Town hall square

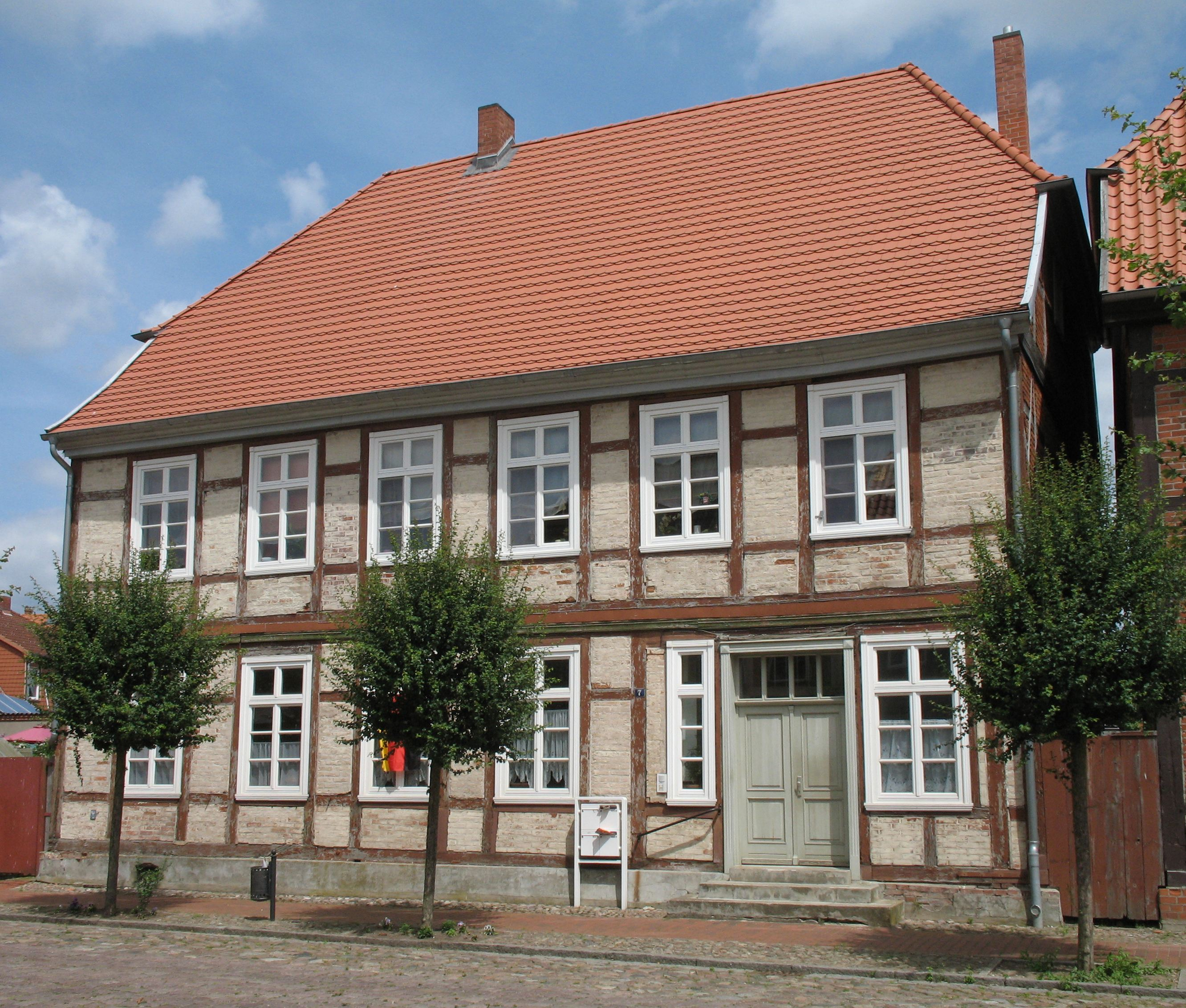
Elbstraße

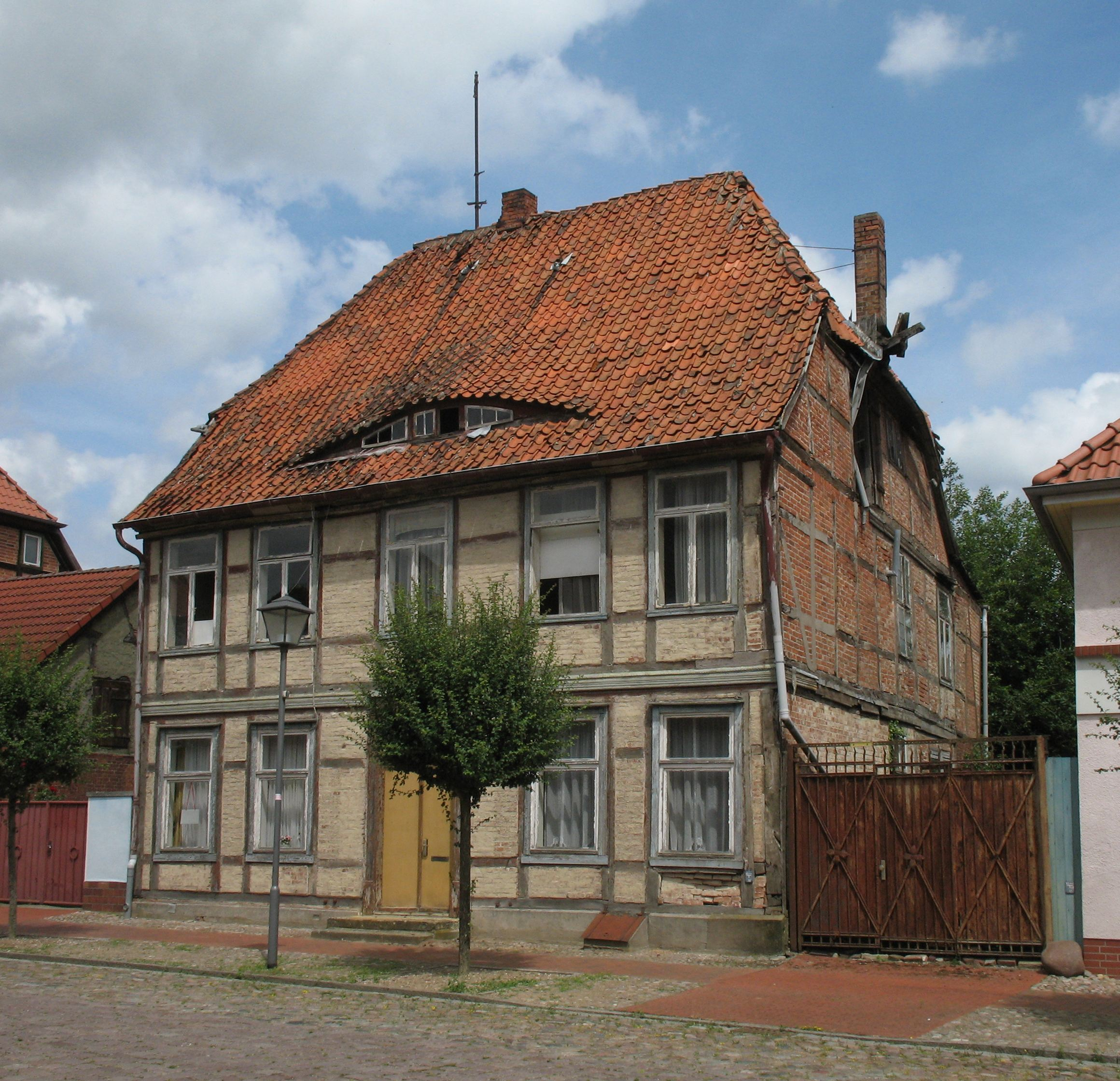

== Notable people ==
- Joachim Slüter (1490–1532), chaplain and Protestant Reformers
- Johannes von Karpf (1867–1941), marine officer and counter admiral
