= Lord Innermeath =

Title in the peerage of Scotland

Lord Innermeath is an extinct title in the Peerage of Scotland created c. 1471 for Walter Stewart, 1st Lord Innermeath. Stewart had previously been Lord of Lorne, but resigned that title - which came with substantial comital power - under pressure from James III; James wished to weaken the remaining power of the Black Douglases, who had been allies of Walter's uncle, The Black Knight of Lorn. Walter had in fact held the Lordship of Lorne for only a few days, following the murder of his brother, the former Lord of Lorne.

The creation of Lord Innermeath was designed as immediate compensation for Walter's loss of Lorne; he received it on the same day that Lorne was resigned. The title - Innermeath - refers to the family home of the Stewart Lords of Lorn - Innermeath (now Invermay). The Lordship of Lorn was subsequently awarded to Colin Campbell, husband of Walter's niece (Isabel Stewart), who became Earl of Argyll soon after.

The Lords of Innermeath claimed rights to office in the Sherrifdom of Perthshire.

The sixth Lord Innermeath was further ennobled as the Earl of Atholl in 1596, but both titles became extinct upon the death of James Stewart, 2nd Earl of Atholl and 7th Lord Innermeath.

== Lords Innermeath ==
- Walter Stewart, 1st Lord Innermeath (d.c. 1489)
- Thomas Stewart, 2nd Lord Innermeath (k. 1513 Battle of Flodden)
- Richard Stewart, 3rd Lord Innermeath (d. 1532)
- John Stewart, 4th Lord Innermeath (d. 1569)
- James Stewart, 5th Lord Innermeath (d.1585)
- John Stewart, 6th Lord Innermeath (d. 1603) created Earl of Atholl in 1596.
- James Stewart, 7th Lord Innermeath (d. 1625)
