= Witch trials in early modern Scotland =

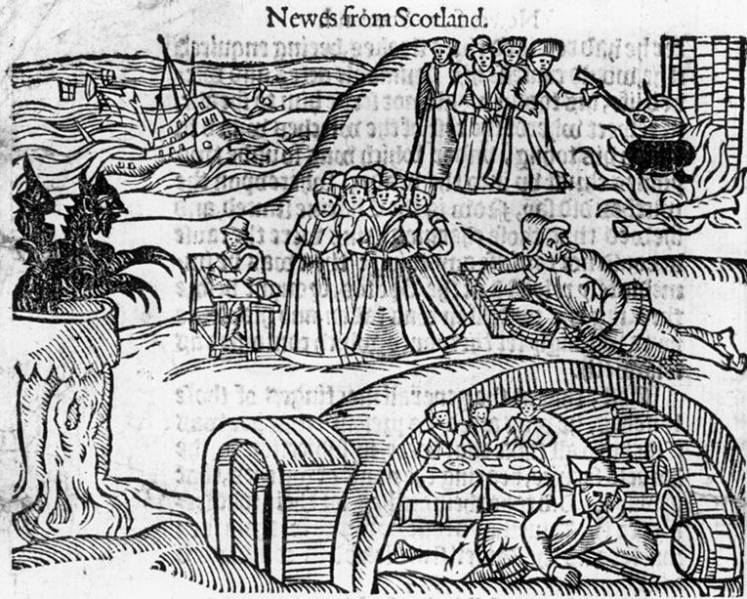
The North Berwick Witches meet the Devil in the local kirkyard, from a contemporary pamphlet, Newes from Scotland

In early modern Scotland, in between the early 16th century and the mid-18th century, judicial proceedings concerned with the crimes of witchcraft (Scottish Gaelic: buidseachd) took place as part of a series of witch trials in Early Modern Europe. In the Late Middle Ages, there were a handful of prosecutions for harm done through witchcraft, but the passing of the Witchcraft Act 1563 made witchcraft, or consulting with witches, capital crimes. The first major issue of trials under the new act were the North Berwick witch trials, beginning in 1590, in which King James VI played a major part as "victim" and investigator. He became interested in witchcraft and published a defence of witch-hunting in the Daemonologie in 1597, but he appears to have become increasingly sceptical and eventually took steps to limit prosecutions.

An estimated 4,000 to 6,000 people, mostly from the Scottish Lowlands, were tried for witchcraft in this period, a much higher rate than for neighbouring England. There were five major series of trials in 1590–91, 1597, 1628–31, 1649–1650 and 1661–62. Seventy-five per cent of the accused were women. Modern estimates indicate that more than 1,500 persons were executed; most were strangled and then burned. The hunts subsided under English occupation after the Civil Wars during the period of the Commonwealth led by Oliver Cromwell in the 1650s, but returned after the Restoration in 1660, causing some alarm and leading to the Privy Council of Scotland limiting arrests, prosecutions and torture. There was also growing scepticism in the later seventeenth century, while some of the factors that may have contributed to the trials, such as economic distress, subsided. Although there were occasional local outbreaks of witch-hunting, the last recorded executions were in 1706 and the last trial in 1727. The Scottish and English parliaments merged in 1707, and the unified British parliament repealed the 1563 act in 1736.

Many causes have been suggested for the hunts, including economic distress, changing attitudes to women, the rise of a "godly state", the inquisitorial Scottish judicial system, the widespread use of judicial torture, the role of the local kirk, decentralised justice and the prevalence of the idea of the diabolic pact. The proliferation of partial explanations for the witch-hunt has led some historians to proffer the concept of "associated circumstances", rather than one single significant cause.

== Origins ==
=== Legal origins ===
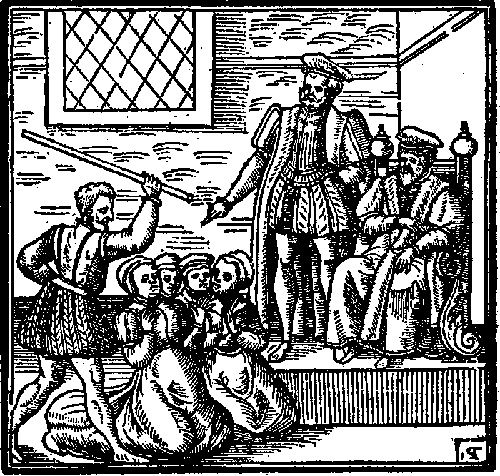
Illustration of witches, perhaps being tortured before James VI, from his Daemonologie (1597)

For late medieval Scotland there is evidence of occasional prosecutions of individuals for causing harm through witchcraft. High-profile political cases included the action against John Stewart, Earl of Mar for allegedly using sorcery against his brother King James III in 1479. Evidence of these political cases indicates that they were becoming rarer in the first half of the sixteenth century however. Popular belief in magic was widespread in the Middle Ages, but theologians had been generally sceptical, and lawyers interested in prosecuting only cases in which harm from magic was seen as being evident. Three women from Edinburgh and Dunfermline accused of witchcraft were held at St Andrews Castle and executed by burning on 10 October 1542. They were accused of divination and malefice, using harmful magic.

From the late sixteenth century attitudes began to change, and witches were seen as deriving powers from the devil, with the result that witchcraft was seen as a form of heresy. These ideas were widely accepted by both Catholics and Protestants in the sixteenth century. In the aftermath of the initial Reformation settlement of 1560, Parliament passed the Witchcraft Act 1563, one of a series of laws underpinning Biblical laws and similar to that passed in England a year earlier, which made the practice of witchcraft itself, and consulting with witches, capital crimes.

The first witch-hunt under the act was in the east of the country in 1568–69 in Angus and the Mearns, where there were unsuccessful attempts to introduce elements of the diabolic pact and the hunt collapsed. The Earl of Argyll made a progress in Lorne, Argyll, and Cowal in July 1574 holding courts and executing men and women convicted of "common sorcery."

=== Role of James VI ===
James VI's visit to Denmark in 1589, where witch-hunts were already common, may have encouraged an interest in the study of witchcraft, and he came to see the storms he encountered on his voyage as the result of magic. After his return to Scotland, he attended the North Berwick witch trials, the first major persecution of witches in Scotland under the 1563 Act and the first known to successfully involve the diabolic pact. Several people, most notably Agnes Sampson and the schoolmaster John Fian, were convicted of using witchcraft to send storms against James' ship. James became obsessed with the threat posed by witches. He subsequently believed that his cousin, the nobleman Francis Stewart, 5th Earl of Bothwell, was a witch, and after the latter fled in fear of his life, he was outlawed as a traitor. Stewart had been a rival of James as there were several disputes over the legitimacy of the Scottish and English thrones, especially following the execution of Mary, Queen of Scots (James' mother and Stewart's aunt), causing Stewart to be punished by James for several plots against him. The king subsequently set up royal commissions to hunt down witches in his realm, recommending torture in dealing with suspects. James is known to have personally supervised the torture of women accused of being witches. Inspired by his personal involvement, in 1597 he wrote the Daemonologie, a tract that opposed the practice of witchcraft and which provided background material for Shakespeare's Tragedy of Macbeth, which contains probably the most famous literary depiction of Scottish witches.

James imported continental explanations of witchcraft. In the view of Thomas Lolis, James I's goal was to divert suspicion away from male homosociality among the elite, and focus fear on female communities and large gatherings of women. He thought they threatened his political power so he laid the foundation for witchcraft and occultism policies, especially in Scotland. The point was that a widespread belief in the conspiracy of witches and a witches' Sabbath with the devil deprived women of political influence. Occult power was supposedly a womanly trait because women were weaker and more susceptible to the devil. However, after the publication of Daemonologie his views became more sceptical, and in the same year he revoked the standing commissions on witchcraft, limiting prosecutions by the central courts.

== Nature of the trials ==
Although Scotland had probably about one quarter of the population of England, it had three times the number of witchcraft prosecutions, at an estimated 4,000 to 6,000 over the entire period. This was about four times the European average. The overwhelming majority were in the Lowlands, where the Kirk had more control, despite the evidence that basic magical beliefs were very widespread in the Highlands. Persecution of witchcraft in Orkney differed from the mainland with most trials taking place before 1650. Large series of trials included those in 1590–91 and Great Scottish Witch Hunt of 1597, which took place across Scotland from March to October. At least 400 people were put on trial for various forms of diabolism. The number of those executed as a result of these trials is unknown, but is believed to be about 200. Later major trials included hunts in 1628–31 and 1649–50. Probably the most intense witch-hunt was in 1661–62, which involved some 664 named witches in four counties.

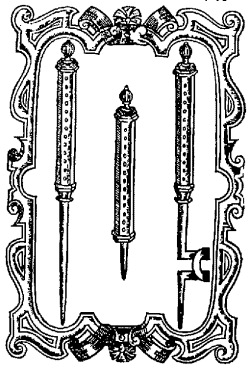
False witch-pricking bodkins from Reginald Scott's Discovery of Witchcraft, 1584

Most of the accused, some 75%, were women, though some men were also executed as witches or as warlocks. Modern estimates indicate that over 1,500 persons were executed. Most of these were older women, with some younger women and men accused because they were related to an accused witch, usually as daughters and husbands. Some men were accused because they were folk healers who were felt to have misused their powers, although folk healers as a group were not targeted. Most were not vagrants or beggars, but settled members of their communities. Most had built a reputation for witchcraft over years, which resulted in prosecution when a "victim" suffered ill fortune, particularly after a curse had been issued. The use of curses by some women as a means of acquiring social power may have made this process more likely to occur.

Almost all witchcraft prosecutions took place in secular courts under the provisions of the 1563 Act. In 1649 the religiously radical Covenanter regime passed a new witchcraft act that ratified the existing act and extended it to deal with consulters of "Devils and familiar spirits", who would now be punished with death. There were three main types of court in which accused witches could be tried. First was the Court of Justiciary in Edinburgh, which took cases from all over Scotland, with a heavy bias to the local region. Next were the circuit courts, presided over by judges from the central courts and held in the various shires of the country. Finally, there were a series of ad hoc local courts, held under commissions by the Privy Council or Parliament and staffed by local landholders and gentlemen to try witches in the places where they were accused. Based on known outcomes, the execution rates for the local courts were much higher than the courts run by professional lawyers, with the local courts executing some 90 per cent of the accused, the Judiciary Court 55 per cent, but the circuit courts only 16 per cent. After the revocation of the standing commissions in 1597, the pursuit of witchcraft was largely taken over by kirk sessions, disciplinary committees run by the parish elite, and was often used to attack "superstitious" and Catholic practices. The central courts only launched a trial when the Privy Council issued a commission, although the council did not have full control over prosecutions in the Court of Judiciary.

Scottish witchcraft trials were notable for their use of pricking, in which a suspect's skin was pierced with needles, pins and bodkins as it was believed that they would possess a Devil's mark through which they could not feel pain. Professional prickers included John Kincaid and John Dick, whose actions helped set off the outbreak of witch-hunting in 1661–62, and whose exposure as frauds, and subsequent imprisonment, helped end the trials. Judicial torture was used in some high-profile cases, like that of John Fine, one of the witches accused of plotting the death of the king in 1590, whose feet were crushed in a shin press, known as the boots. However, these cases were relatively rare. Confessions, considered the best evidence for conviction, were more usually extracted by "waking" the witch, keeping the suspect sleep deprived. After about three days individuals tend to hallucinate, and this provided some exotic detail in witchcraft trials. In Scotland, convicted witches were usually strangled at the stake before having their bodies burned, although there are instances where they were burned alive.

== Witch beliefs ==
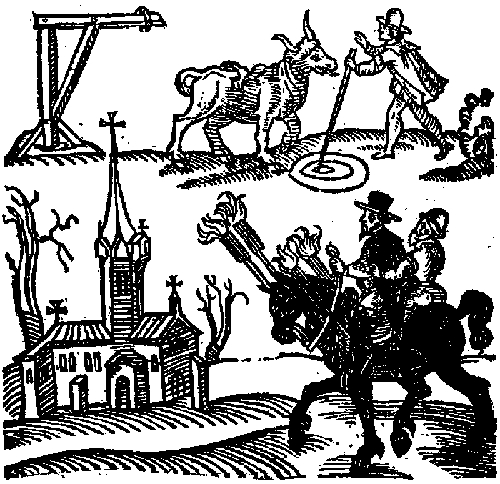
Illustration of Doctor Fian, from Newes from Scotland

The belief that witches could cause harm was common among all social groups in early modern Scotland. In 1701 in Anstruther, Elizabeth Dick had been turned away from the local mill when begging. She cursed the mill and several witnesses testified that the grain in the mill turned red. Only when one of the people who had refused her help ran after her and gave her alms did she bless the mill and everything returned to normal. About half of accused witches had already gained a reputation for causing harm over a long period of time. The fact that only four per cent of recorded accused witches were involved in folk healing seems to indicate that healing skills were largely seen as different from witchcraft. The Aberdeenshire trials of 1596 reveal that spells could be purchased from folk magicians for success at fishing, to ensure a happy marriage, to prolong life and to affect the weather, but harmful spells were considered witchcraft. Many accusations included sexual fears. Margaret Bane, a midwife, it was claimed, could transfer the pains of childbirth to a woman's husband and Helen Gray cast a spell on a man that gave him a permanent erection. Witches and other sorts of folk magicians could also carry out divinations. These included by reading the marks on the shoulder blade of a slaughtered animal, measuring a person's sleeve or waist to see if they were suffering from a fever, or being able to find answers based on which way a sieve suspended from scissors or shears swung, as Margaret Mungo was accused of doing, before the kirk session of Dingwall in 1649.

It has often been stated that Scottish witchcraft was particularly concerned with the demonic pact. In the high court, Katherine Sands, who was one of four women accused of witchcraft at Culross in 1675, admitted to renouncing her baptism, receiving the Devil's mark and having sex with the Devil, but in local trials these demonic elements were rarer. Stuart MacDonald notes that in trials from Fife, the Devil was a relatively insignificant and indistinct figure and that a number of instances of covens meeting look like fairy revels, where the dancing fairies traditionally disappeared when a human broke the ring, rather than satanic gatherings. Fairies were an important part of magical beliefs in Scotland. Isobel Gowdie, the young wife of a cottar from near Auldearn, who was tried for witchcraft in 1662, left four depositions, gained without torture, that provide one of the most detailed insights into magical beliefs in Britain. She stated that her coven met on nearby Downie Hill, that they could transform themselves into hares and that she had been entertained by the Queen of the Fairies in her home under the hill. J. A. MacCulloch argued that there was a "mingling of beliefs" in Scotland, between popular belief in fairies and elite Christian ideas of demonic action. Alison Dick of Kirkcaldy in Fife was accused with her husband by neighbours for putting 'curses' on them, and was burned to death on 8 November 1633. She is one of the thirteen accused witches in an exhibition Witches in Word, Not Deed by artist Carolyn Sutton, at the Edinburgh Central Library in 2023.

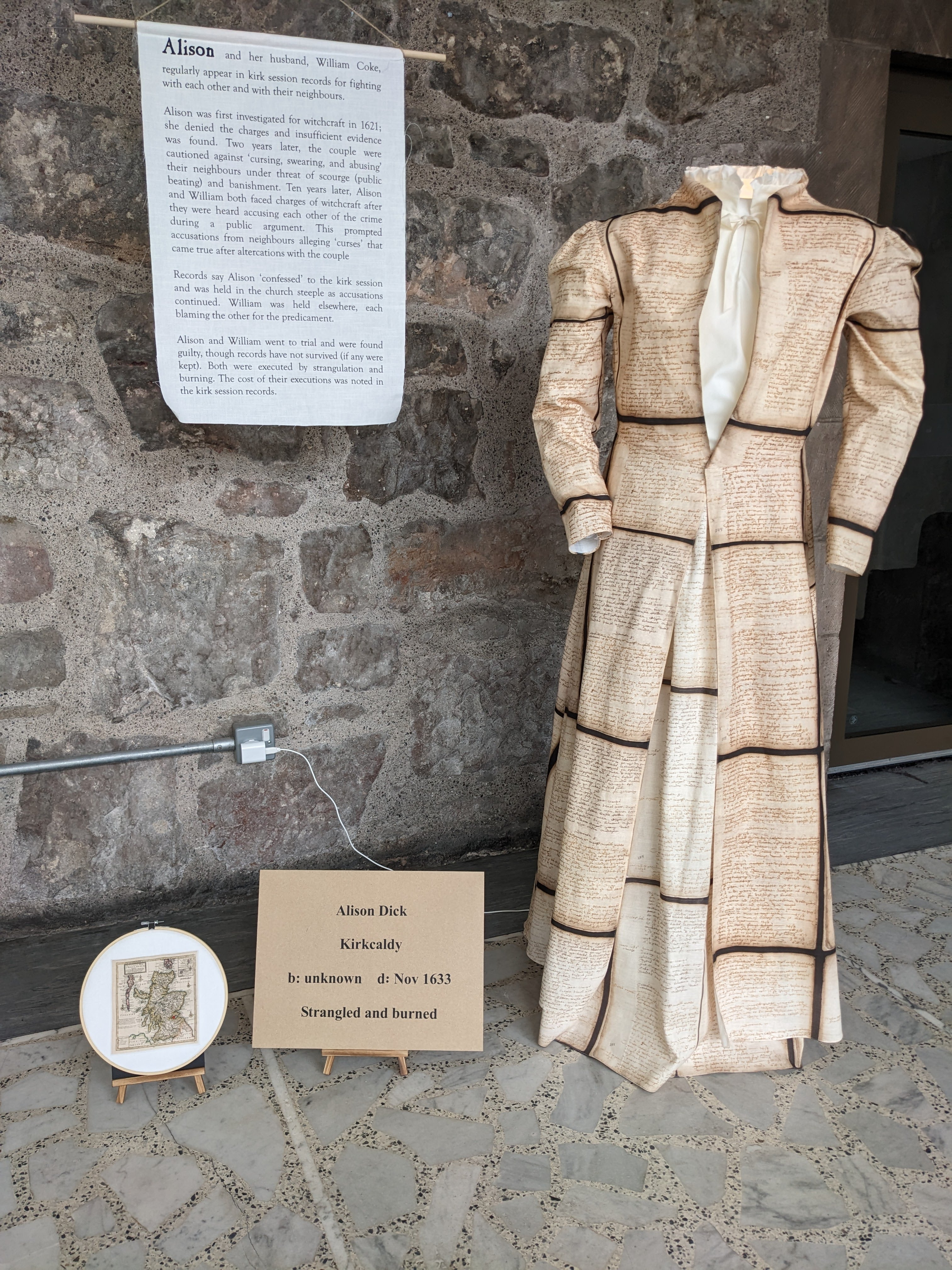
Alison Dick display at Edinburgh Central Library 'Witches in Word, Not Deed' by Carolyn Sutton

== Decline ==
In the seventeenth century there was growing scepticism about the reality of witchcraft among the educated elite. Scotland was defeated in the Civil Wars by the forces of the English parliament led by Oliver Cromwell and occupied. In 1652 Scotland was declared part of a Commonwealth with England and Ireland and the Privy Council and courts ceased to exist. The English judges who replaced them were hostile to the use of torture and often sceptical of the evidence it produced, resulting in a decline in prosecutions. In an attempt to gain support among the landholding orders, Sheriff's courts were re-established and Justices of the Peace returned in 1656. The result was a wave of witchcraft cases, with 102 in the period 1657–59. The limitations on prosecutions were fully reversed with the Restoration of the monarchy in 1660, and there was a flood of over 600 cases that alarmed the restored Privy Council, leading it to insist on the necessity of its commission for an arrest or prosecution, and banning judicial torture.

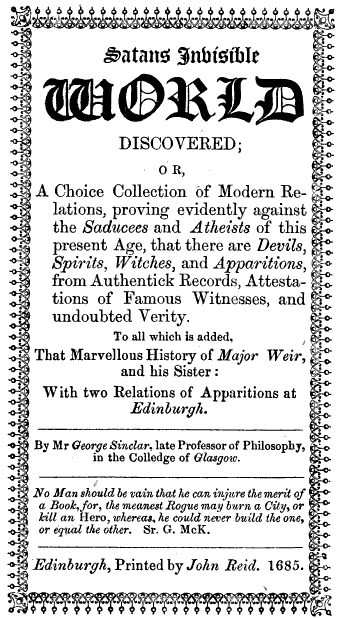
Reprint of the title page of George Sinclair's Satans Invisible World (1685), one of the many tracts published in Scotland arguing against sceptical views of witchcraft

Prosecutions began to decline as trials were more tightly controlled by the judiciary and government, torture was more sparingly used and standards of evidence were raised. The exposure of prickers as frauds in 1662 removed a major form of evidence. The Lord Advocate George Mackenzie made efforts to make prosecutions ineffective. There may also have been a growing popular scepticism, and, with relative peace and stability, the economic and social tensions that may have contributed to accusations were reduced, although there were occasional local outbreaks, like those in Forfar in 1662, East Lothian in 1678 and in Paisley in 1697. The last executions in the records of the central courts were in 1706. The last trial was held against Janet Horne in the court of a sheriff-depute at Dornoch in 1727, and was of questionable legality. The British Parliament repealed the 1563 act in 1736, making the legal pursuit of witches impossible. Nevertheless, basic magical beliefs persisted, particularly in the Highlands and Islands.

== Causes ==
Various reasons for the Scottish witch-hunt, and its more intense nature than that in England, have been advanced by historians. Older theories, that there was a widespread pagan cult that was persecuted in this period and that the witch-hunts were the result of a rising medical profession eliminating folk healers, have been discredited among professional historians. Most of the major periods of prosecution coincided with periods of intense economic distress, and some accusations may have followed the withdrawal of charity from marginal figures, particularly the single women that made up many of the accused. The reformed Kirk that emerged from 1560 was heavily influenced by Calvinism and Presbyterianism, and may have perceived women as more of a moral threat. As a result the witch-hunt in Scotland has been seen as a means of controlling women. However two of the major witch-hunts took place while the Church of Scotland was controlled by Episcopalians. Christina Larner suggested that the outbreak of the hunt in the mid-sixteenth century was tied to the rise of a "godly state", where the reformed Kirk was closely linked to an increasingly intrusive Scottish crown and legal system.

It has been suggested that the intensity of Scottish witch-hunting was due to an inquisitorial judicial system and the widespread use of judicial torture. However, Brian P. Levack argues that the Scottish system was only partly inquisitorial and that use of judicial torture was extremely limited, similar to the situation in England. A relatively high level of acquittal in Scottish trials may have been due to the employment of defence lawyers in Scottish courts, a benefit not given accused witches in England. The close involvement of the Scottish Kirk in trials and the decentralised nature of Scottish courts, where local magistrates heard many cases (in contrast to England where most were before a small number of circuit judges), may have contributed to higher rates of prosecution. The diabolic pact is often stated as a major difference between Scottish and English witchcraft cases, but Stuart Maxwell argues that the iconography of Satan may be an imposition of central government beliefs on local traditions, particularly those concerned with fairies, which were more persistent in Scotland than in England. The proliferation of partial explanations for the witch-hunt has led some historians to proffer the concept of "associated circumstances", rather than one single significant cause.

== 21st-century pardons and memorials ==
In 2020 and 2021, three centuries after repeal of the Witchcraft Act, and after a two-year campaign by the Witches of Scotland group, a member’s bill in the Scottish parliament has the support of the Scottish administration to clear the names of those accused. On the International Women's Day in 2022, First Minister Nicola Sturgeon officially apologized on behalf of the Scottish government to those accused under the Witchcraft Act.

The Kirk apologised in May 2022 for its part in the persecution of those accused of witchcraft. In Forfar, a plaque was placed on the Town House which has been built on top of the tolbooth where the victims of the Forfar witch trials were imprisoned; in additional a local couple also erected a memorial to the victims close to Forfar loch.

In 2023, there was an exhibition of thirteen figures of accused witches, Witches in Words, not Deeds, created by Carolyn Sutton. Alison Dick was one of the figures exhibited at Edinburgh's Central Library.

== See also ==
- Witch trials in England
- Survey of Scottish Witchcraft
