= History of popular religion in Scotland =

1500, John Konx, John Calvin ,

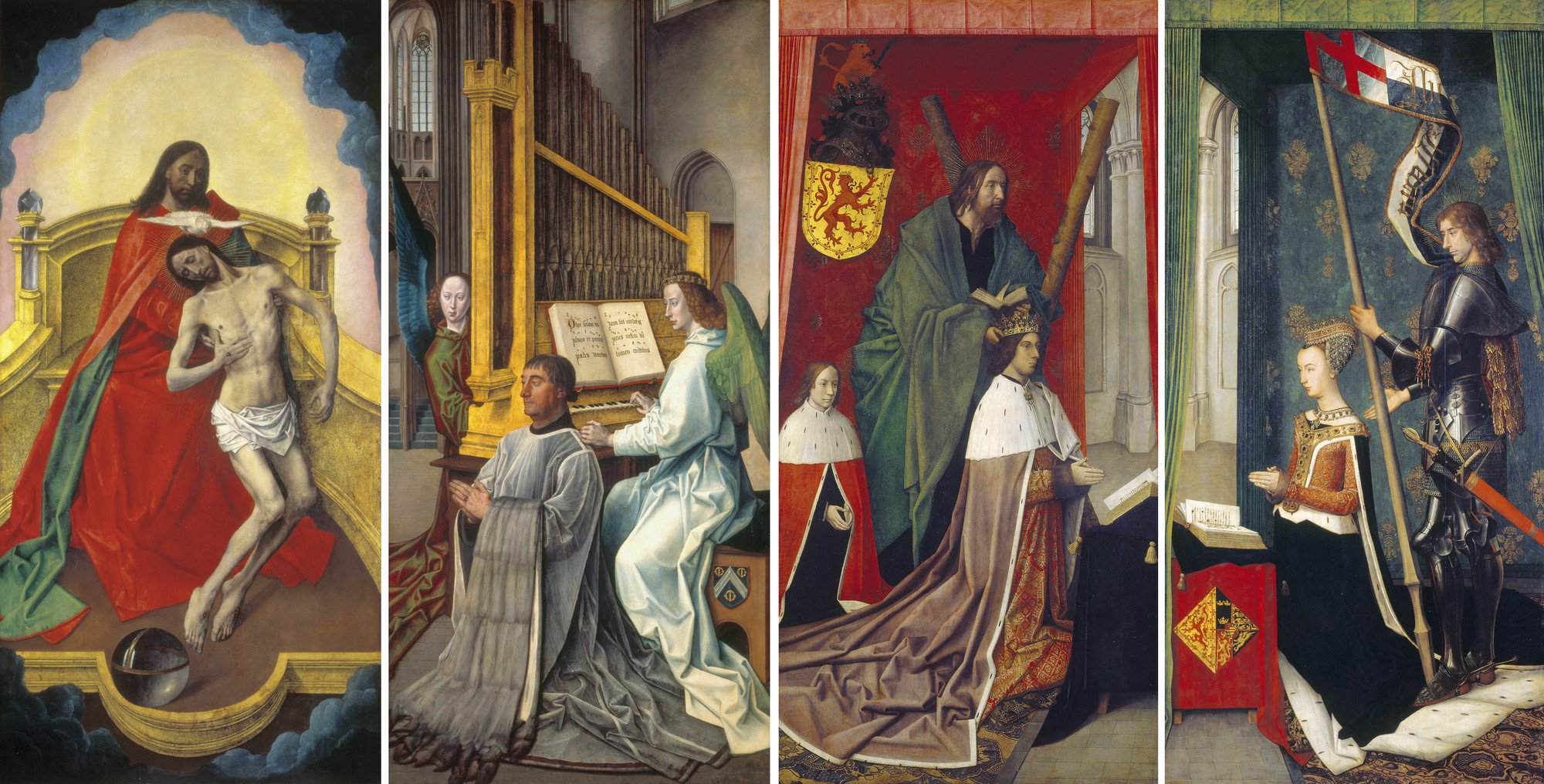
The fifteenth-century Trinity Altarpiece by Flemish artist Hugo van der Goes

The history of popular religion in Scotland includes all forms of the formal theology and structures of institutional religion, between the earliest times of human occupation of what is now Scotland and the present day. Very little is known about religion in Scotland before the arrival of Christianity. It is generally presumed to have resembled Celtic polytheism and there is evidence of the worship of spirits and wells. The Christianisation of Scotland was carried out by Irish-Scots missionaries and to a lesser extent those from Rome and England, from the sixth century. Elements of paganism survived into the Christian era (see: folk religion). The earliest evidence of religious practice is heavily biased toward monastic life. Priests carried out baptisms, masses and burials, prayed for the dead and offered sermons. The church dictated moral and legal matters and impinged on other elements of everyday life through its rules on fasting, diet, the slaughter of animals and rules on purity and ritual cleansing. One of the main features of Medieval Scotland was the Cult of Saints, with shrines devoted to local and national figures, including St Andrew, and the establishment of pilgrimage routes (see: folk saints). Scots also played a major role in the Crusades. Historians have discerned a decline of monastic life in the late medieval period. In contrast, the burghs saw the flourishing of mendicant orders of friars in the later fifteenth century. As the doctrine of Purgatory gained importance the number of chapelries, priests and masses for the dead within parish churches grew rapidly. New "international" cults of devotion connected with Jesus and the Virgin Mary began to reach Scotland in the fifteenth century. Heresy, in the form of Lollardry, began to reach Scotland from England and Bohemia in the early fifteenth century, but did not achieve a significant following.

The Reformation, carried out in Scotland in the mid-sixteenth century and heavily influenced by Calvinism, amounted to a revolution in religious practice. Sermons were now the focus of worship. The Witchcraft Act 1563 made witchcraft, or consulting with witches, capital crimes. There were major series of trials in 1590–91, 1597, 1628–31, 1649–50 and 1661–62. Prosecutions began to decline as trials were more tightly controlled by the judiciary and government, torture was more sparingly used and standards of evidence were raised. Seventy-five per cent of the accused were women and modern estimates indicate that over 1,500 persons were executed across the whole period. Scottish Protestantism in the seventeenth century was highly focused on the Bible, which was seen as infallible and the major source of moral authority. In the mid-seventeenth century Scottish Presbyterian worship took the form it was to maintain until the liturgical revival of the nineteenth century with the adoption of the Westminster Directory in 1643. The seventeenth century saw the high-water mark of kirk discipline, with kirk sessions able to apply religious sanctions, such as excommunication and denial of baptism, to enforce godly behaviour and obedience. Kirk sessions also had an administrative burden in the system of poor relief and a major role in education. In the eighteenth century there were a series of reforms in church music. Communion was the central occasion of the church, conducted at most once a year, sometimes in outdoor holy fairs.

Industrialisation, urbanisation and the Disruption of 1843 all undermined the tradition of parish schools. Attempts to supplement the parish system included Sunday schools. By the 1830s and 1840s these had widened to include mission schools, ragged schools, Bible societies and improvement classes. After the Great Disruption in 1843, the control of relief was removed from the church and given to parochial boards. The temperance movement was imported from America and by 1850 it had become a central theme in the missionary campaign to the working classes. Church attendance in all denominations declined after World War I. It increased in the 1950s as a result of revivalist preaching campaigns, particularly the 1955 tour by Billy Graham, and returned to almost pre-war levels. From this point there was a steady decline that accelerated in the 1960s. Sectarianism became a serious problem in the twentieth century. This was most marked in Glasgow in the traditionally Roman Catholic team, Celtic, and the traditionally Protestant team, Rangers. Relations between Scotland's churches steadily improved during the second half of the twentieth century and there were several initiatives for cooperation, recognition and union. The foundation of the ecumenical Iona Community in 1938 led to a highly influential form of music, which was used across Britain and the US. The Dunblane consultations in 1961–69 resulted in the British "Hymn Explosion" of the 1960s, which produced multiple collections of new hymns. In recent years other religions have established a presence in Scotland, mainly through immigration, including Islam, Hinduism, Buddhism and Sikhism. Other minority faiths include the Baháʼí Faith and small Neopagan groups. There are also various organisations which actively promote humanism and secularism.

== Pre-Christian religion ==
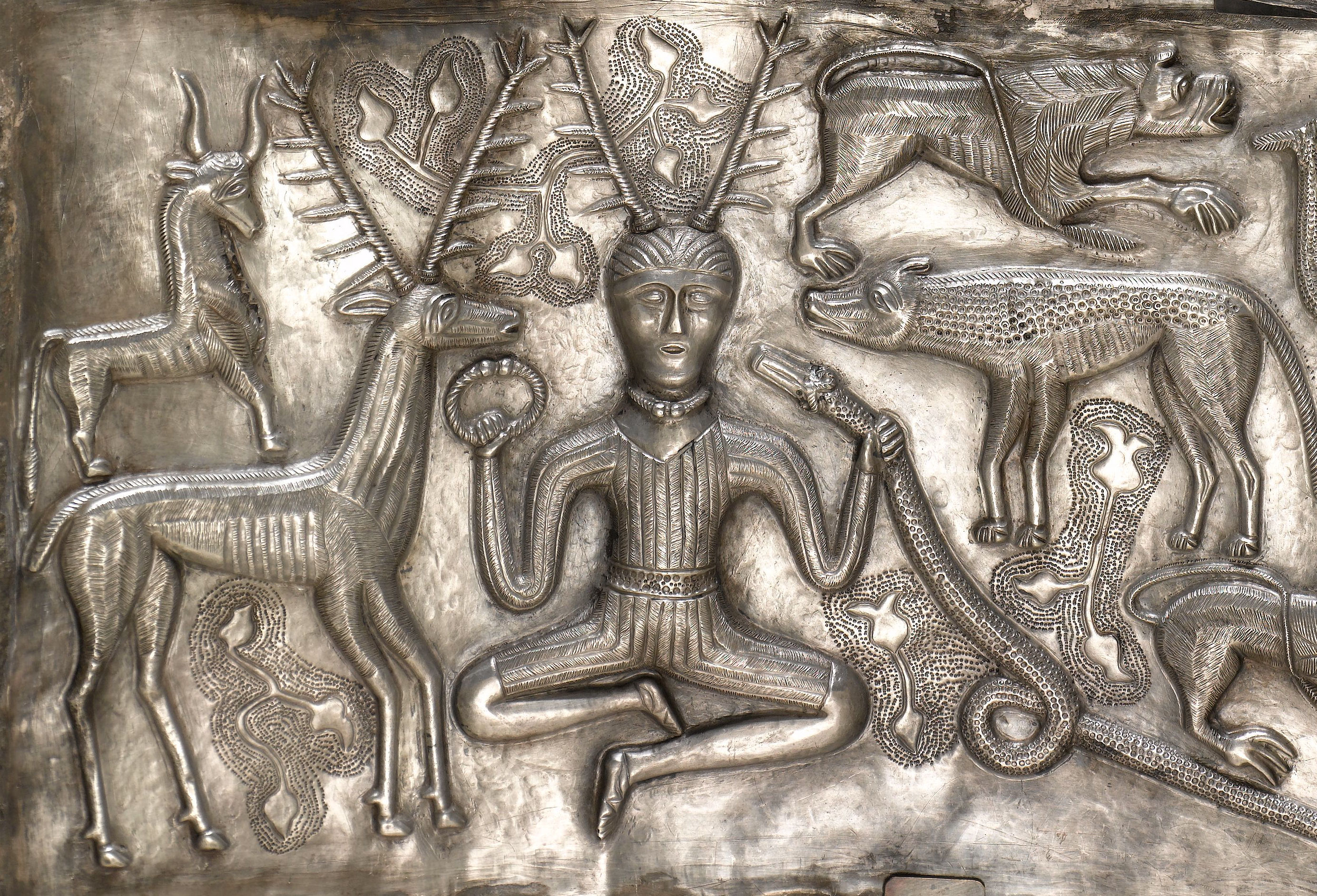
The "Cernunnos" type antlered figure on the Gundestrup Cauldron found in Denmark

Very little is known about religion in Scotland before the arrival of Christianity. The lack of native written sources among the Picts means that it can only be judged from parallels elsewhere, occasional surviving archaeological evidence and hostile accounts of later Christian writers. It is generally presumed to have resembled Celtic polytheism. The names of more than two hundred Celtic deities have been noted, some of which, like Lugh, The Dagda and The Morrigan, come from later Irish mythology, whilst others, like Teutates, Taranis and Cernunnos, come from evidence from Gaul. The Celtic pagans constructed temples and shrines to venerate these gods, something they did through votive offerings and performing sacrifices, possibly including human sacrifice. According to Greek and Roman accounts, in Gaul, Britain and Ireland, there was a priestly caste of "magico-religious specialists" known as the druids, although very little is definitely known about them. Irish legends about the origin of the Picts and stories from the life of St. Ninian, associate the Picts with druids. The Picts are also associated in Christian writing with "demon" worship and one story concerning St. Columba has him exorcising a demon from a well in Pictland, suggesting that the worship of well spirits was a feature of Pictish paganism. Roman mentions of the worship of the Goddess Minerva at wells, and a Pictish stone associated with a well near Dunvegan Castle on Skye, have been taken to support this case.

== Early Middle Ages ==
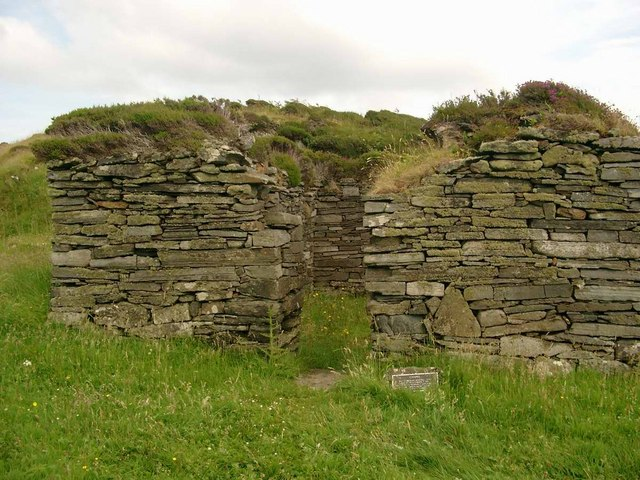
Remains of a chapel on Eileach an Naoimh

The Christianisation of Scotland was carried out by Irish-Scots missionaries and to a lesser extent those from Rome and England from the sixth century. This movement is traditionally associated with the figures of St Ninian, St Kentigern and St Columba. Elements of paganism survived into the Christian era. Sacred wells and springs became venerated as sites of pilgrimage.

Most evidence of Christian practice comes from monks and is heavily biased towards monastic life. From this can be seen the daily cycle of prayers and the celebration of the Mass. Less well recorded, but as significant, was the role of bishops and their clergy. Bishops dealt with the leaders of the tuath, ordained clergy and consecrated churches. They also had responsibilities for the poor, hungry, prisoners, widows and orphans. Priests carried out baptisms, masses and burials. They also prayed for the dead and offered sermons. They anointed the sick with oil, brought communion to the dying and administered penance to sinners. The church encouraged alms giving and hospitality. It also dictated in moral and legal matters, including marriage and inheritance. It also impinged on other elements of everyday life through its rules on fasting, diet, the slaughter of animals and rules on purity and ritual cleansing.

Early local churches were widespread, but since they were largely made of wood, like that excavated at Whithorn, the only evidence that survives for most is in place names that contain words for church, including cill, both, eccles and annat, but others are indicated by stone crosses and Christian burials. Beginning on the west coast and islands and spreading south and east, these were replaced with basic masonry-built buildings. Many of these were built by local lords for their tenants and followers, but often retaining a close relationship with monastic institutions.

Viking raids began on monasteries like Iona and Lindisfarne began in the eighth century. Orkney, Shetland and the Western Isles eventually fell to the Norsemen. Although there is evidence of varying burial rites practised by Norse settlers in Scotland, such as grave goods found on Colonsay and Westray, there is little that enables a confirmation that the Norse gods were venerated prior to the reintroduction of Christianity. The Odin Stone has been used as evidence of Odinic beliefs and practices but the derivation may well be from "oathing stone". A few Scandinavian poetic references suggest that Orcadian audiences understood elements of the Norse pantheon, although this is hardly conclusive proof of active beliefs. Nonetheless, it is likely that pagan practices existed in early Scandinavian Scotland.

== High Middle Ages ==
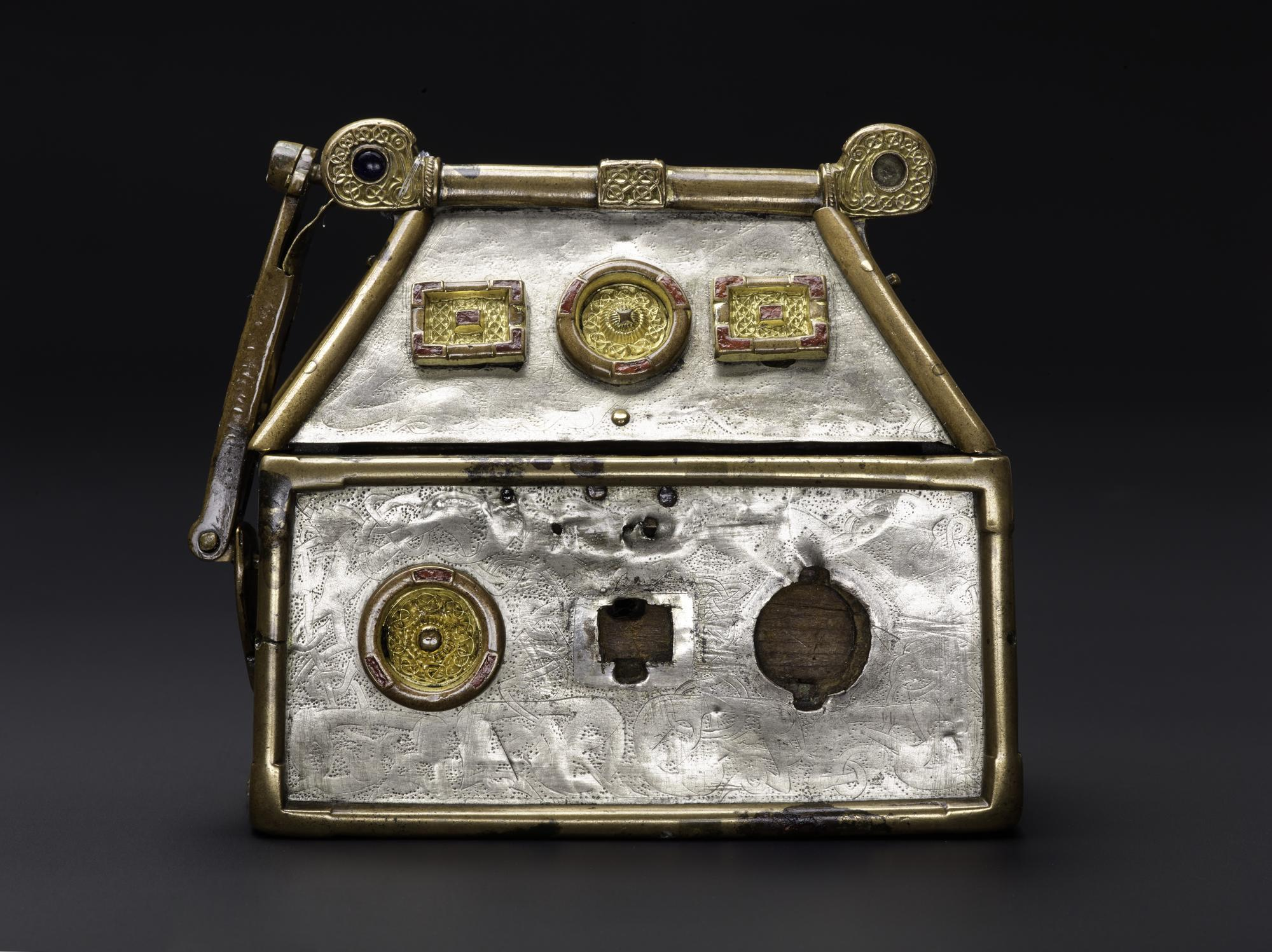
The Monymusk Reliquary, or Brecbennoch, said to house the bones of Columba

One of the main features of Medieval Scotland was the Cult of Saints. Saints of Irish origin who were particularly revered included various figures called St Faelan and St. Colman, and saints Findbar and Finan. Columba remained a major figure into the fourteenth century and a new foundation was endowed by William I (r. 1165–1214) at Arbroath Abbey. His relics, contained in the Monymusk Reliquary, were handed over to the Abbot's care. Regional saints remained important to local identities. In Strathclyde the most important saint was St Kentigern, whose cult (under the pet name St. Mungo) became focused in Glasgow. In Lothian it was St Cuthbert, whose relics were carried across the Northumbria after Lindisfarne was sacked by the Vikings before being installed in Durham Cathedral. After his martyrdom around 1115, a cult emerged in Orkney, Shetland and northern Scotland around Magnus Erlendsson, Earl of Orkney. One of the most important cults in Scotland, that of St Andrew, was established on the east coast at Kilrymont by the Pictish kings as early as the eighth century. The shrine, which from the twelfth century was said to have contained the relics of the saint brought to Scotland by Saint Regulus, began to attract pilgrims from across Scotland, but also from England and further away. By the twelfth century the site at Kilrymont had become known simply as St. Andrews and it became increasingly associated with Scottish national identity and the royal family. The site was renewed as a focus for devotion with the patronage of Queen Margaret, who also became important after her canonisation in 1250 and after the ceremonial transfer of her remains to Dunfermline Abbey, as one of the most revered national saints.

Pilgrimage was undertaken to local, national and international shrines for personal devotion, as penance imposed by a priest, or to seek cures for illness or infirmity. Written sources and pilgrim badges found in Scotland, of clay, jet and pewter, indicate journeys undertaken to Scottish shrines and further afield. The most visited pilgrimage sites in late medieval Christendom were Jerusalem, Rome and Santiago de Compostela, in Spain, but Scottish pilgrims also visited Amiens in France and Canterbury in England.

Scots also played a role in the Crusades. Crusading was preached by friars and special taxation was raised from the late twelfth century. A contingent of Scots took part in the First Crusade (1096–1099). Significant numbers of Scots participated in the Egyptian crusades and the Seventh Crusade (1248–1254) and Eighth Crusade (1270), led by Louis IX of France. A later commentator indicated that many of these were ordinary Scotsmen. Many died of disease, including the leaders and Louis himself. This was the last great crusade, although the ideal remained a major concern of late medieval kings, including Robert I and James IV.

The Christian calendar incorporated elements of existing practice and dominated the social life of communities. Fairs were held at Whitsun and Martinmas, at which people traded, married, moved house and conducted other public business. The mid-Winter season of Yule involved two weeks of revels in which even the clergy joined in. The feast of Corpus Christi, focused on the body of Christ and held in June, grew in importance throughout the period. The central occasion of the Christian calendar was Easter. It was preceded by the 40 days of fasting of Lent, during which preachers urged full confession, which took place in church aisles to by priests and friars. It cumulated in Easter Sunday, when most parishioners received their annual communion.

== Late Middle Ages ==
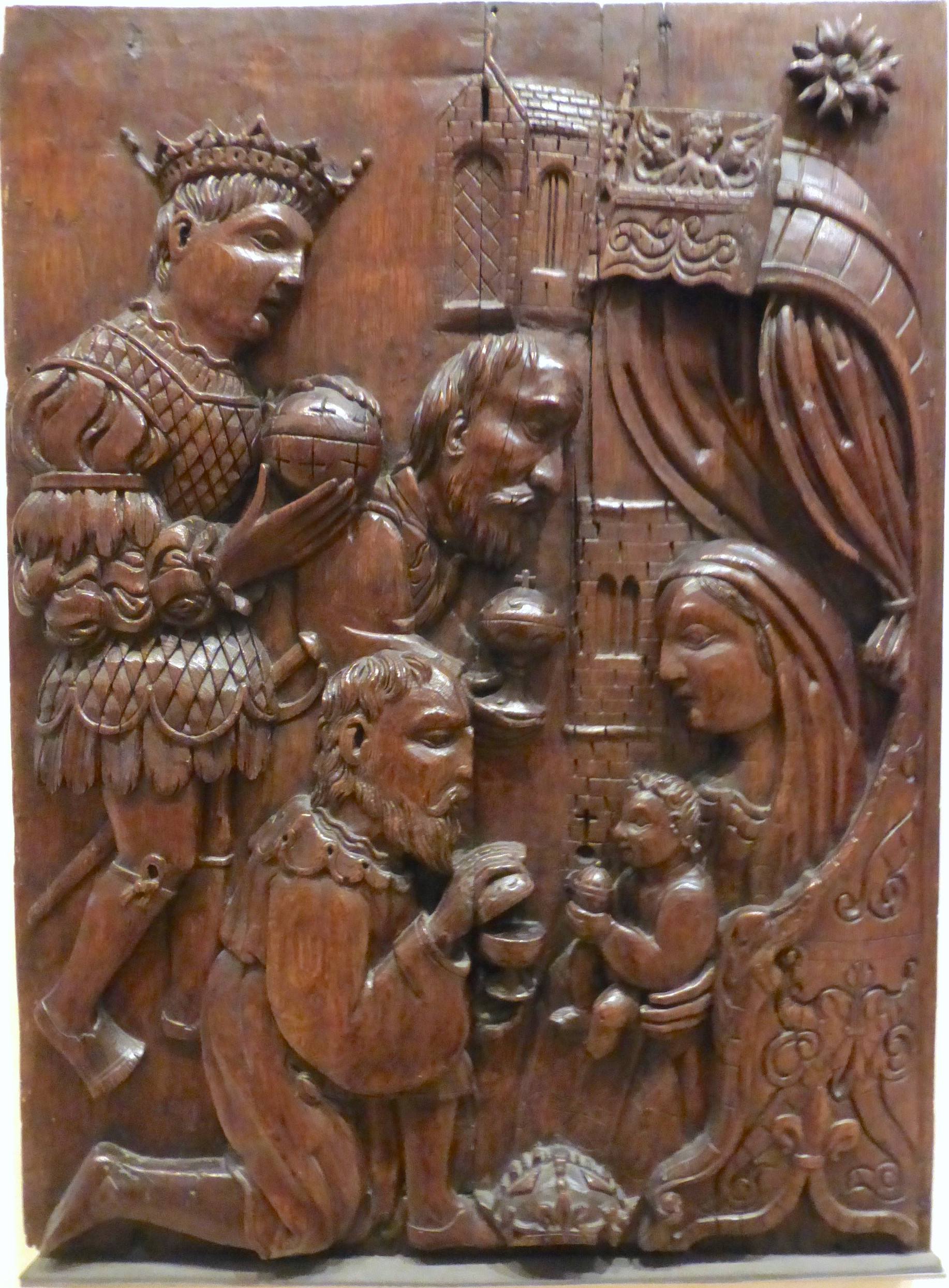
The Adoration of the Magi, a rare survival of pre-Reformation religious iconography from a house in Dundee

Traditional Protestant historiography tended to stress the corruption and unpopularity of the late Medieval Scottish church, but more recent research has indicated the ways in which it met the spiritual needs of different social groups. Historians have discerned a decline of monastic life in this period, with many religious houses keeping smaller numbers of monks, and those remaining often abandoning communal living for a more individual and secular lifestyle. The rate of new monastic endowments from the nobility also declined in the fifteenth century. In contrast, the burghs saw the flourishing of mendicant orders of friars in the later fifteenth century, who, unlike the older monastic orders, placed an emphasis on preaching and ministering to the population. The order of Observant Friars were organised as a Scottish province from 1467 and the older Franciscans and the Dominicans were recognised as separate provinces in the 1480s.

In most Scottish burghs, in contrast to English towns where churches and parishes tended to proliferate, there was usually only one parish church, but as the doctrine of Purgatory gained importance in the period, the number of chapelries, priests and masses for the dead within them, designed to speed the passage of souls to Heaven, grew rapidly. The number of altars dedicated to saints, who could intercede in this process, also grew dramatically, with St. Mary's in Dundee having perhaps 48 and St Giles' in Edinburgh over 50. The number of saints celebrated in Scotland also proliferated, with about 90 being added to the missal used in St Nicholas church in Aberdeen. New "international" cults of devotion connected with Jesus and the Virgin Mary began to reach Scotland in the fifteenth century, including the Five Wounds, the Holy Blood and the Holy Name of Jesus, but also St Joseph, St. Anne, the Three Kings and the Apostles, would become more significant in Scotland. There were also new religious feasts, including celebrations of the Presentation, the Visitation and Mary of the Snows.

Heresy, in the form of Lollardry, began to reach Scotland from England and Bohemia in the early fifteenth century. Lollards were followers of John Wycliffe (c. 1330–84) and later Jan Hus (c. 1369–1415), who called for reform of the Church and rejected its doctrine on the Eucharist. Despite evidence of a number of burnings of heretics and limited popular support for its anti-sacramental elements, it probably remained a small movement. There were also further attempts to differentiate Scottish liturgical practice from that in England, with a printing press established under royal patent in 1507 in order to replace the English Sarum Use for services.

== Sixteenth century ==
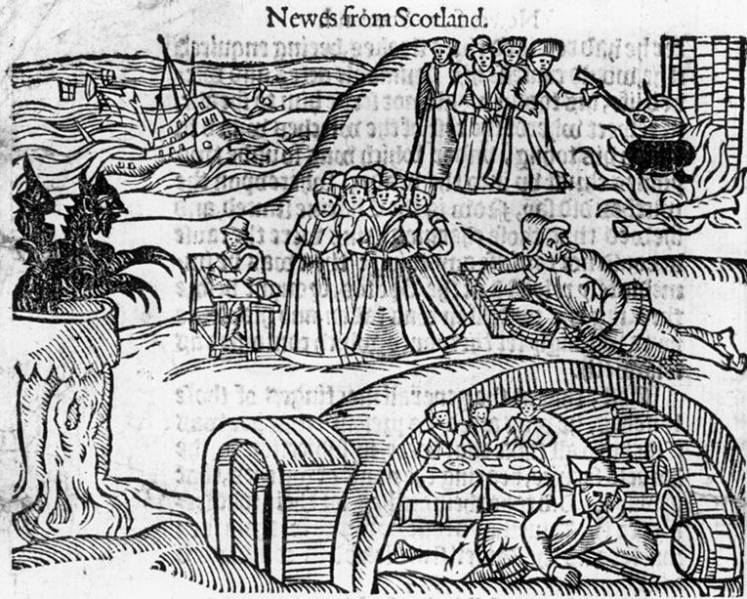
The North Berwick Witches meet the Devil in the local kirkyard, from a contemporary pamphlet, Newes from Scotland

The Reformation, carried out in Scotland in the mid-sixteenth century and heavily influenced by Calvinism, amounted to a revolution in religious practice. It led to the abolition of auricular confession, the wafer in mass, which was no longer seen as a "work", Latin in services, prayers to Mary and the Saints and the doctrine of Purgatory. The interiors of churches were transformed, with the removal of the High Altar, altar rails, rood screens, choir stalls, side altars, statues and images of the saints. The colourful paintwork of the late Middle Ages was removed, with walls whitewashed to conceal murals. In place of all this were a plain table for communion, pews for the congregation, pulpits and lecterns for the sermons that were now the focus of worship. Printed sermons indicate that they could be as long as three hours. Until the 1590s most parishes were not served by a minister, but by readers, who could not preach or administer the sacraments. As a result, they might only hear a sermon once every two weeks and communion was usually administered once a year on Easter Sunday.

In the late Middle Ages there had been a handful of prosecutions for harm done through witchcraft, but the passing of the Witchcraft Act 1563 made witchcraft, or consulting with witches, capital crimes. The first major series of trials under the new act were the North Berwick witch trials, beginning in 1589, in which James VI played a major part as "victim" and investigator. He became interested in witchcraft and published a defence of witch-hunting in the Daemonologie in 1597, but he appears to have become increasingly sceptical and eventually took steps to limit prosecutions. An estimated 4,000 to 6,000 people, mostly from the Scottish Lowlands, were tried for witchcraft in this period; a much higher rate than for neighbouring England. There were major series of trials in 1590–91, 1597, 1628–31, 1649–50 and 1661–62. Seventy-five per cent of the accused were women and the hunt has been seen as a means of controlling women. Modern estimates indicate that over 1,500 persons were executed across the whole period.

== Seventeenth century ==
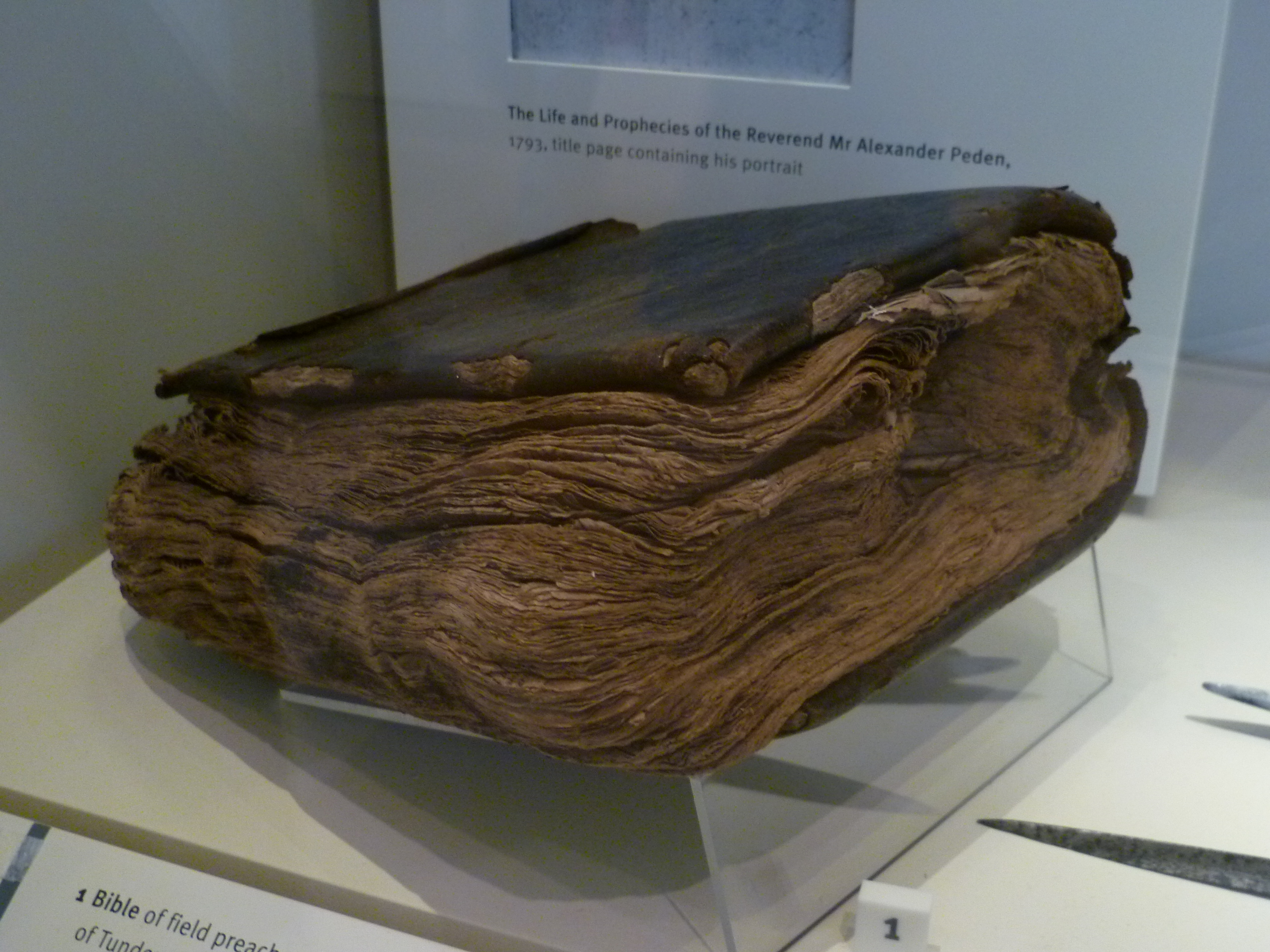
The Bible of William Hannay of Tundergarth, a Covenanter during the period of the "Killing Time"

Scottish Protestantism in the seventeenth century was highly focused on the Bible, which was seen as infallible and the major source of moral authority. In the early part of the century the Genevan translation was commonly used. In 1611 the Kirk adopted the Authorised King James Version and the first Scots version was printed in Scotland in 1633, but the Geneva Bible continued to be employed into the seventeenth century. Many Bibles were large, illustrated and highly valuable objects. They often became the subject of superstitions, being used in divination. Family worship was strongly encouraged by the Covenanters. Books of devotion were distributed to encourage the practice and ministers were encouraged to investigate whether this was being carried out.

It was in the mid-seventeenth century that Scottish Presbyterian worship took the form it was to maintain until the liturgical revival of the nineteenth century. The adoption of the Westminster Directory in 1643 meant that the Scots adopted the English Puritan dislike of set forms of worship. The recitation of the Creed, Lord's Prayer, Ten Commandments and Doxology were abandoned in favour of the lengthy sermon of the lecture. The centrality of the sermon meant that services tended to have a didactic and wordy in character. The only participation by the congregation was musical, in the singing of the psalms. From the late seventeenth century the common practice was lining out, by which the precentor sang or read out each line and it was then repeated by the congregation.

The seventeenth century saw the high-water mark of kirk discipline. Kirk sessions were able to apply religious sanctions, such as excommunication and denial of baptism, to enforce godly behaviour and obedience. In more difficult cases of immoral behaviour they could work with the local magistrate, in a system modelled on that employed in Geneva. Public occasions were treated with mistrust and from the later seventeenth century there were efforts by kirk sessions to stamp out activities such as well-dressing, bonfires, guising, penny weddings and dancing. Kirk sessions also had an administrative burden in the system of poor relief. An act of 1649 declared that local heritors were to be assessed by kirk sessions to provide the financial resources for local relief, rather than relying on voluntary contributions. By the mid-seventeenth century the system had been rolled out across the Lowlands, but was limited in the Highlands. The system was largely able to cope with general poverty and minor crises, helping the old and infirm to survive and provide life support in periods of downturn at relatively low cost, but was overwhelmed in the major subsistence crisis of the 1690s. The kirk also had a major role in education. Statutes passed in 1616, 1633, 1646 and 1696 established a parish school system, paid for by local heritors and administered by ministers and local presbyteries. By the late seventeenth century there was a largely complete network of parish schools in the Lowlands, but in the Highlands basic education was still lacking in many areas.

In the seventeenth century the pursuit of witchcraft was largely taken over by the kirk sessions and was often used to attack superstitious and Catholic practices in Scottish society. The most intense witch hunt was in 1661–62, which involved some 664 named witches in four counties. From this point prosecutions began to decline as trials were more tightly controlled by the judiciary and government, torture was more sparingly used and standards of evidence were raised. There may also have been a growing scepticism and with relative peace and stability the economic and social tensions that contributed to accusation may have reduced. There were occasional local outbreaks like that in East Lothian in 1678 and 1697 at Paisley. The last recorded executions were in 1706 and the last trial in 1727. The British parliament repealed the 1563 Act in 1736.

== Eighteenth century ==
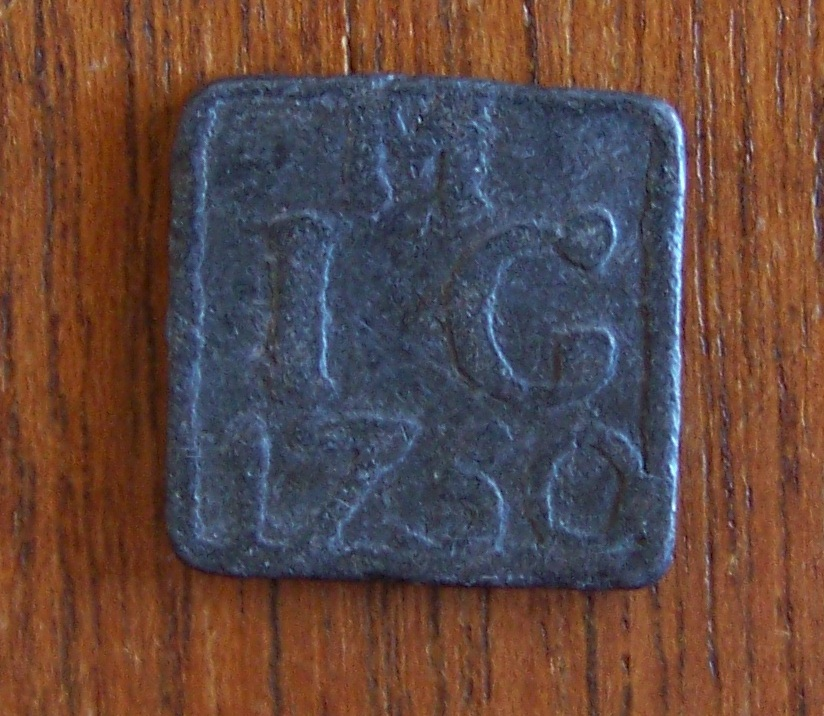
A Scottish communion token from 1750

The kirk had considerable control over the lives of the people. It had a major role in the Poor Law and schools, which were administered through the parishes, and over the morals of the population, particularly over sexual offences such as adultery and fornication. A rebuke was necessary for moral offenders to "purge their scandal". This involved standing or sitting before the congregation for up to three Sundays and enduring a rant by the minister. There was sometimes a special repentance stool near the pulpit for this purpose. In a few places the subject was expected to wear sackcloth. From the 1770s private rebukes were increasingly administered by the kirk session, particularly for men from the social elites, while until the 1820s the poor were almost always give a public rebuke. In the early part of the century the kirk, particularly in the Lowlands, attempted to suppress dancing and events like penny weddings at which secular tunes were played. The oppression of secular music and dancing by the kirk began to ease between about 1715 and 1725.

From the second quarter of the eighteenth century it was argued that lining out should be abandoned in favour of the practice of singing the psalms stanza by stanza. In the second half of the century these innovations became linked to a choir movement that included the setting up of schools to teach new tunes and singing in four parts.

Among Episcopalians, Qualified Chapels used the English Book of Common Prayer. They installed organs and hired musicians, following the practice in English parish churches, singing in the liturgy as well as metrical psalms, while the non-jurors had to worship covertly and less elaborately. When the two branches united in the 1790s, the non-juring branch soon absorbed the musical and liturgical traditions of the qualified churches. Catholic worship was deliberately low-key, usually in the private houses of recursant landholders or in domestic buildings adapted for services. Surviving chapels from this period are generally austere and simply furnished. Typical worship consisted of a sermon, long vernacular prayers and Low Mass in Latin. Musical accompaniment was prohibited until the nineteenth century, when organs began to be introduced into chapels.

Communion was the central occasion of the church, conducted infrequently, at most once a year. Communicants were examined by a minister and elders, proving their knowledge of the Shorter Catechism. They were then given communion tokens that entitled them to take part in the ceremony. Long tables were set up in the middle of the church at which communicants sat to receive communion. Where ministers refused or neglected parish communion, largely assemblies were carried out in the open air, often combining several parishes. These large gatherings were discouraged by the General Assembly, but continued. They could become mixed with secular activities and were commemorated as such by Robert Burns in the poem Holy Fair. They could also be occasions for evangelical meetings, as at the Cambuslang Wark.

== Nineteenth century ==
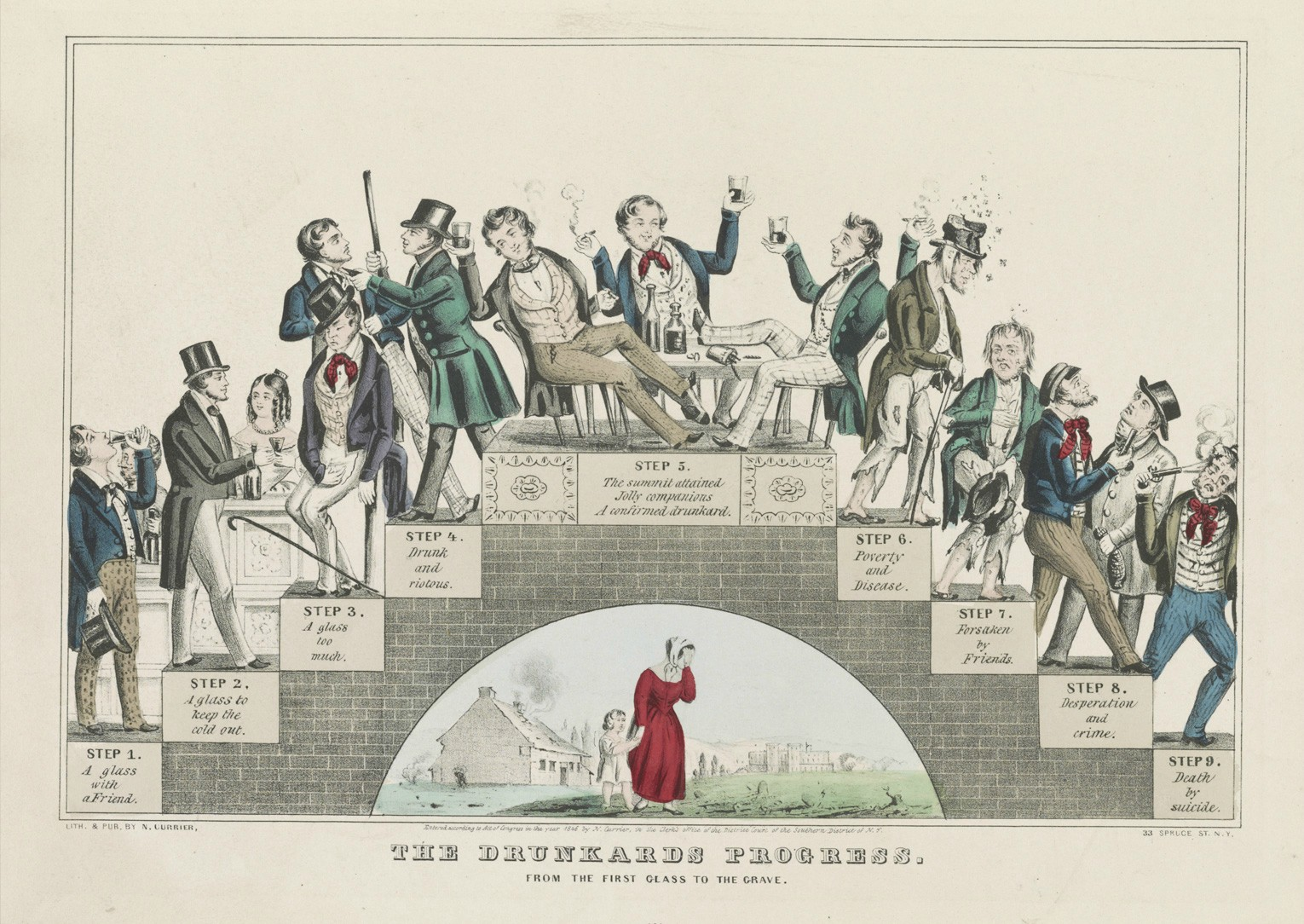
The Drunkard's Progress, a US lithograph from 1846, shows the stages of alcoholism that were common in temperance propaganda

The rapid population expansion in the late eighteenth century and early nineteenth century, particularly in the major urban centres, overtook the system of parishes on which the established church depended, leaving large numbers of "unchurched" workers, who were estranged from organised religion. The Kirk began to concern itself with providing churches in the new towns and relatively thinly supplied Highlands, establishing a church extension committee in 1828. Chaired by Thomas Chalmers, by the early 1840s it had added 222 churches, largely through public subscription. The new churches were most attractive to the middle classes and skilled workers. The majority of those in severe hardship could not afford pew rents needed to attend and remained outside of the church system.

Industrialisation, urbanisation and the Disruption of 1843 all undermined the tradition of parish schools. Attempts to supplement the parish system included Sunday schools. Originally begun in the 1780s by town councils, they were adopted by all religious denominations in the nineteenth century. By the 1830s and 1840s these had widened to include mission schools, ragged schools, Bible societies and improvement classes, open to members of all forms of Protestantism and particularly aimed at the growing urban working classes. By 1890 the Baptists had more Sunday schools than churches and were teaching over 10,000 children. The number would double by 1914. The problem of a rapidly growing industrial workforce meant that the Old Poor Law, based on parish relief administered by the church, had broken down in the major urban centres. Thomas Chambers, who advocated self-help as a solution, lobbied forcibly for the exclusion of the able bodied from relief and that payment remained voluntary, but in periods of economic downturn genuine suffering was widespread. After the Disruption in 1845 the control of relief was removed from the church and given to parochial boards, but the level of relief remained inadequate for the scale of the problem.

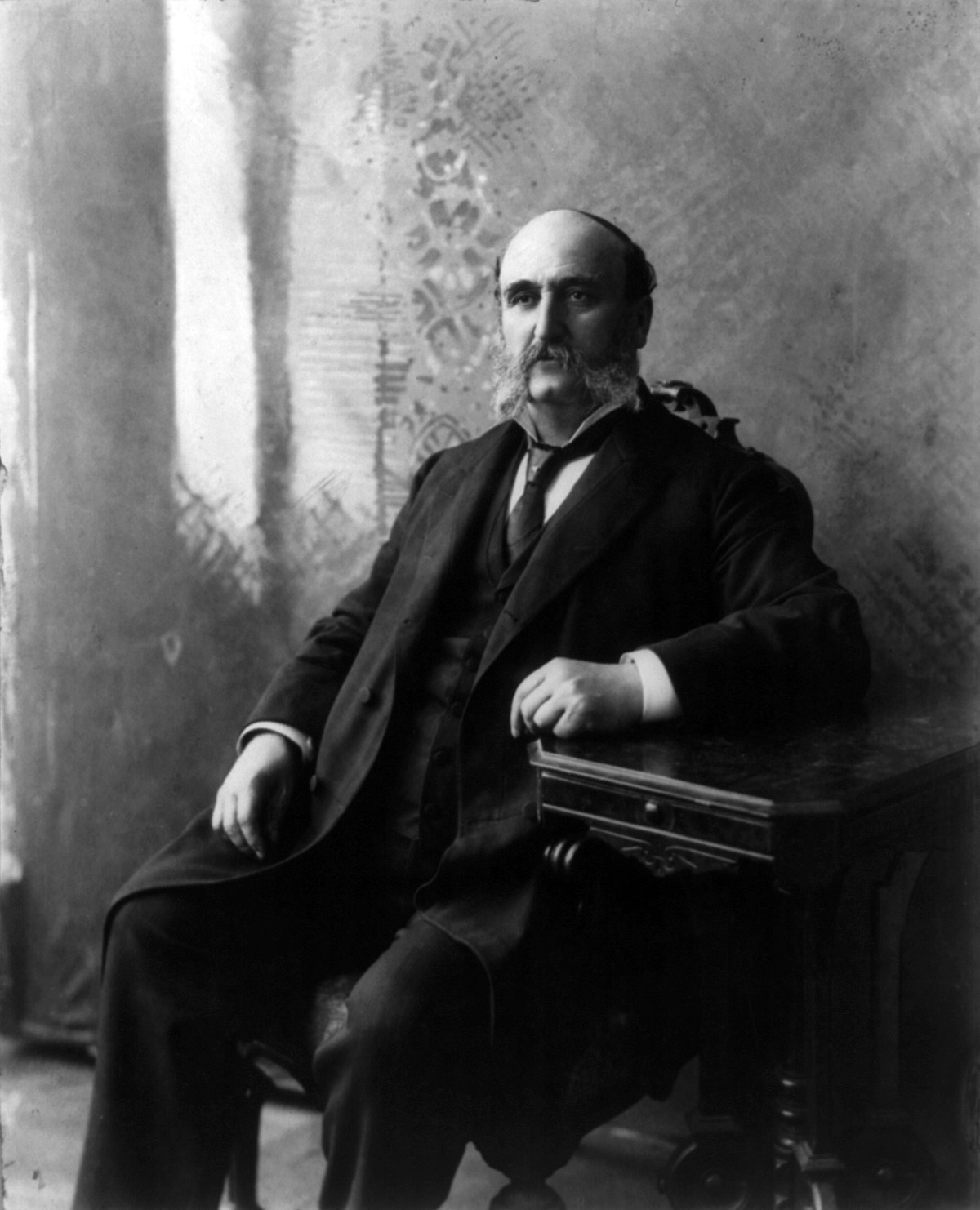
Ira D. Sankey, whose singing and compositions helped popularise accompanied church music in Scotland in the late nineteenth century

The beginnings of the temperance movement can be traced to 1828–29 in Maryhill and Greenock, when it was imported from America. By 1850 it had become a central theme in the missionary campaign to the working classes. A new wave of temperance societies included the United Order of Female Rechabites and the Independent Order of Good Templars, which arrived from the US in 1869 and within seven years had 1,100 branches in Scotland. The Salvation Army also placed an emphasis on sobriety. The Catholic Church had its own temperance movement, founding Catholic Total Abstinence Society in 1839. They made common cause with the Protestant societies, holding joint processions. Other religious-based organisations that expanded in this period included the Orange Order, which had 15,000 members in Glasgow by the 1890s. Freemasonry also made advances in the late nineteenth century, particularly among skilled artisans.

There was a liturgical revival in the late nineteenth century strongly influenced by the English Oxford Movement, which encouraged a return to Medieval forms of architecture and worship, including the reintroduction of accompanied music into the Church of Scotland. The revival saw greater emphasis on the liturgical year and sermons tended to become shorter. The Church Service Society was founded in 1865 to promote liturgical study and reform. A year later organs were officially admitted to Church of Scotland churches. They began to be added to churches in large numbers and by the end of the century roughly a third of Church of Scotland ministers were members of the society and over 80 per cent of kirks had both organs and choirs. However, they remained controversial, with considerable opposition among conservative elements within the church and organs were never placed in some churches. In the Episcopalian Church the influence of the Oxford Movement and links with the Anglican Church led to the introduction of more traditional services and by 1900 surpliced choirs and musical services were the norm. The Free Church was more conservative over music, and organs were not permitted until 1883. Hymns were first introduced in the United Presbyterian Church in the 1850s. They became common in the Church of Scotland and Free Church in the 1870s. The Church of Scotland adopted a hymnal with 200 songs in 1870 and the Free Church followed suit in 1882. The visit of American Evangelists Ira D. Sankey (1840–1908), and Dwight L. Moody (1837–99) to Edinburgh and Glasgow in 1874–75 helped popularise accompanied church music in Scotland. Sankey made the harmonium so popular that working-class mission congregations pleaded for the introduction of accompanied music. The Moody-Sankey hymn book remained a best seller into the twentieth century.

== Early Twentieth Century ==
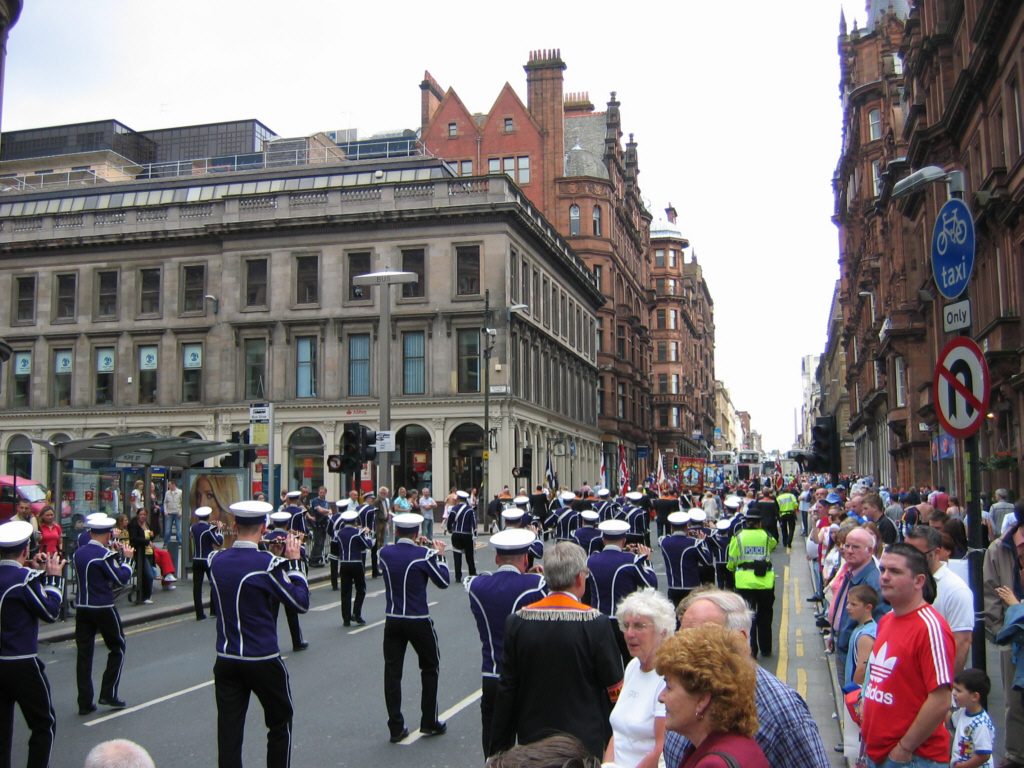
An Orange Order march in Glasgow

Church attendance in all denominations declined after World War I. Reasons that have been suggested for this change include the growing power of the nation state, socialism and scientific rationalism, which provided alternatives to the social and intellectual aspects of religion. By the 1920s roughly half the population had a relationship with one of the Christian denominations. This level was maintained until the 1940s when it dipped to 40 per cent during World War II, but it increased in the 1950s as a result of revivalist preaching campaigns, particularly the 1955 tour by Billy Graham, and returned to almost pre-war levels. From this point there was a steady decline that accelerated in the 1960s. By the 1980s it was just over 30 per cent. The decline was not even geographically, socially, or in terms of denominations. It most affected urban areas and the traditional skilled working classes and educated middle classes, while participation stayed higher in the Catholic Church than the Protestant denominations.

Sectarianism became a serious problem in the Twentieth Century. In the interwar period religious and ethnic tensions between Protestants and Catholics were exacerbated by the Great Depression. The Orange Order was still dominated by Irish Protestants and became a focus for Anti-Catholic feeling. It appealed strongly to working class Protestants and organised parades and carnivalesque commemorations of the Battle of the Boyne that veered into riotous behaviour. Tensions were heightened by the leaders of the Free Church and Church of Scotland and later the reunified church, who orchestrated a racist campaign against the Catholic Irish in Scotland. Key figures leading the campaign were George Malcolm Thomson and Andrew Dewar Gibb. This focused on the threat to the "Scottish race" based on spurious statistics that continued to have influence despite being discredited by official figures in the early 1930s. This created a climate of intolerance that led to calls for jobs to be preserved for Protestants. After the Second World War the Church became increasingly liberal in attitude and moved away from hostile attitudes. Sectarian attitudes continued to manifest themselves in football rivalries between Protestant and Catholic supporters. This was most marked in Glasgow in the traditionally Roman Catholic team, Celtic, and the traditionally Protestant team, Rangers. Celtic employed Protestant players and managers, but Rangers have had a tradition of not recruiting Catholics. Major watersheds were Rangers signing of the Catholic player Mo Johnston (b. 1963) in 1989, and in 1999 the appointment of their first Catholic captain, Lorenzo Amoruso.

At the same time there were moves towards creating links between the various denominations. The Scottish Council of Churches was formed as an ecumenical body in 1924. In the early twentieth century the Catholic Church in Scotland formalised the use of hymns, with the publication of The Book of Tunes and Hymns (1913), the Scottish equivalent of the Westminster Hymnal. The foundation of the ecumenical Iona Community in 1938, on the island of Iona off the coast of Scotland, led to a highly influential form of music, which was used across Britain and the US. Leading musical figure John Bell (b. 1949) adapted folk tunes or created tunes in a folk style to fit lyrics that often emerged from the spiritual experience of the community.

== Later twentieth century to the present ==
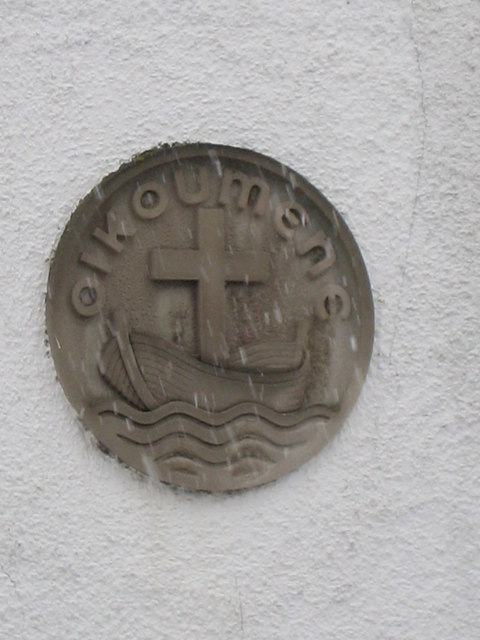
Plaque on Scottish Church House, Dunblane, one of the major centres of the ecumenical movement in Scotland in the twentieth century

Relations between Scotland's churches steadily improved during the second half of the twentieth century and there were several initiatives for cooperation, recognition and union. The Scottish Council of Churches was formed as an ecumenical body in 1924. Proposals in 1957 for union with the Church of England were rejected over the issue of bishops and were severely attacked in the Scottish press. The Scottish Episcopal church opened the communion table up to all baptised and communicant members of all the trinitarian churches and church canons were altered to allow the interchangeability of ministers within specific local ecumenical partnerships. The Dunblane consultations, informal meetings at the ecumenical Scottish Church House in Dunblane in 1961–69, attempted to produce modern hymns that retained theological integrity. They resulted in the British "Hymn Explosion" of the 1960s, which produced multiple collections of new hymns.

In 1990, the Scottish Churches' Council was dissolved and replaced by Action of Churches Together in Scotland (ACTS), which attempted to bring churches together to set up ecumenical teams in the areas of prisons, hospitals, higher education and social ministries and inner city projects. At the end of the twentieth century the Scottish Churches Initiative for Union (SCIFU), between the Episcopal Church, the Church of Scotland, the Methodist Church and the United Reformed Church, put forward an initiative whereby there would have been mutual recognition of all ordinations and that subsequent ordinations would have satisfied episcopal requirements, but this was rejected by the General Assembly in 2003.

The decline in religious affiliation continued in the early twenty-first century. In the 2001 census, 27.5 per cent who stated that they had no religion (which compares with 15.5 per cent in the UK overall) and 5.5 per cent did not state a religion. In the 2011 census roughly 54 per cent of the population identified with a form of Christianity and 36.7 per cent stated they had no religion. Other studies suggest that those not identifying with a denomination or who see themselves as non-religious may be much higher at between 42 and 56 per cent, depending on the form of question asked. In recent years other religions have established a presence in Scotland, mainly through immigration and higher birth rates among ethnic minorities, rather than large numbers of converts. Those faiths with the most adherents in the 2011 census were Islam (1.4 per cent, mainly among immigrants from South Asia), Hinduism (0.3 per cent), Buddhism (0.2 per cent) and Sikhism (0.2 per cent). Other minority faiths include Judaism, the Baháʼí Faith and small Neopagan groups. There are also various organisations which actively promote humanism and secularism.
