= Isobel Gowdie =

Scottish woman who confessed to witchcraft at Auldearn near Nairn in 1662

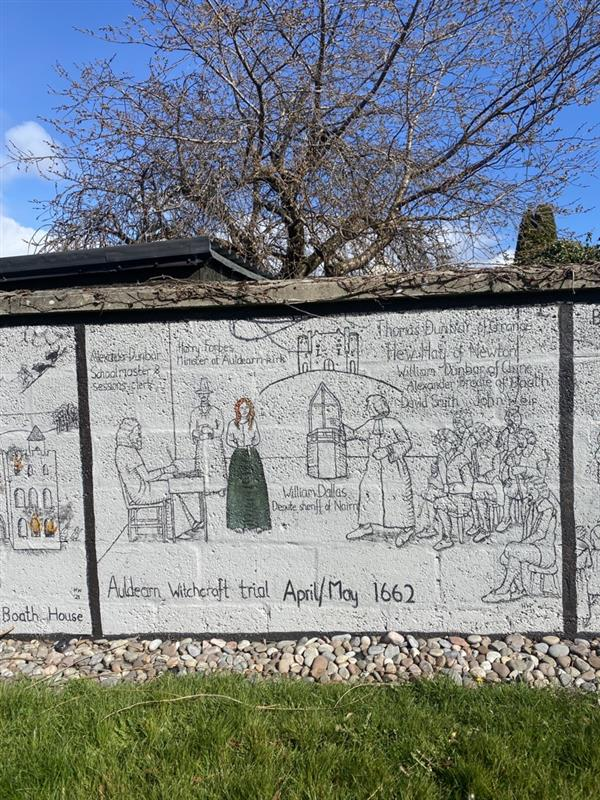
Isobel Gowdie Mural on Auldearn village green, an interpretation of the story of her accusation

Isobel Gowdie (Note: Surname sometimes spelled Gaudie or Goudie; women in Scotland did not assume their husband's name.) was a Scottish woman who confessed to witchcraft at Auldearn near Nairn in 1662. Scant information is available about her age or life, and although she was probably executed in line with the usual practice, it is uncertain whether this was the case or if she was allowed to return to the obscurity of her former life as a cottar’s wife. Her detailed testimony, apparently achieved without the use of violent torture, provides one of the most comprehensive insights into European witchcraft folklore at the end of the era of witch-hunts.

The four confessions she made over a period of six weeks include details of charms and rhymes, claims that she was a member of a coven in the service of the Devil and that she met with the fairy queen and king. Lurid details concerning carnal dealings with the Devil were also provided. A combination of demonic and fairy beliefs, the narratives were used by Margaret Murray as the basis for her now mostly discredited theories about cults and witchcraft.

Modern day academics characterise Gowdie, who was illiterate and of a low social status, as a talented narrator with a creative imagination. It is unclear why she came forward or was initially arrested but she may have suffered from ergotism. Since the confessions were transcribed by Robert Pitcairn and first published in 1833, historians have described the material as remarkable or extraordinary and scholars continue to debate the topic in the 21st century.

Gowdie is commemorated outside academia by songs, books, plays and radio broadcasts. The Confession of Isobel Gowdie, a 1990 work for symphony orchestra, was composed by James MacMillan as a requiem for her.

== Background ==
The early modern period saw the Scottish courts trying many cases of witchcraft and witch hunts began in about 1550. The parliament of Mary, Queen of Scots, passed the Scottish Witchcraft Act in 1563, making convictions for witchcraft subject to capital punishment. Mary's son, James, wrote Daemonologie in 1597 after his involvement with the North Berwick witch trials in 1590 and the Great Scottish Witch Hunt of 1597, a nationwide hunt that started in Aberdeen. In common with other European witch trials, major Scottish witch hunts occurred in batches; historians offer differing opinions as to why this would happen but generally agree that military hostilities and political or economic uncertainty played a part coupled with local ministers and landowners determined to seek convictions. Scotland had been subjected to nearly a century of vigorous oppression although areas in the north of the country had not felt the full brunt of Presbyterianism so a strong belief in fairy traditions and folklore persisted. The Laird of Castle of Park (Aberdeenshire), who owned the land where Gowdie lived, was a fervent Covenanter and rejected all traditional superstitions. He had been involved in commissions for witchcraft trials and the deaths of his father, uncle and grandfather were publicly credited as being caused by witchcraft.

Adverse weather conditions caused a sustained period of poor harvests from 1649 until 1653. The execution of King Charles I took place in 1649 and an extensive witch hunt started that year. Charles II was declared the monarch of Scotland in 1660; most historians connect the Great Scottish Witch Hunt of 1661–62, the last but most severe wave of prosecutions, with the Restoration. Writing in 1884, Scottish antiquary Charles Kirkpatrick Sharpe opined "Whatever satisfaction the return of King Charles the Second might afford to the younger females in his dominions, it certainly brought nothing, save torture and destruction, to the unfortunate old women, or witches of Scotland." According to Emma Wilby, a British historian who has undertaken a comprehensive study of Gowdie and her confessions, she was one of probably seven witches tried in Auldearn during this witch hunt.

== Personal life ==
Records provide no information on Gowdie before her marriage to John Gilbert, who had no involvement in the witchcraft case. Wilby speculates that she would have been brought up in the Auldearn region as she alluded to locations in the area. Likewise no detail is available concerning her age; at the time of her trial in 1662 she may have been aged anywhere from fifteen – although this is unlikely as she claimed to have participated in sexual activities fifteen years before her confession – to well into her thirties or fifties but she was certainly of child-bearing age despite there being no records of her having any children.

Gowdie and her husband lived in the area around Loch Loy, about two miles north of Auldearn. In the 17th century, the sea loch was larger than it is now and was surrounded by woodland, hills and sand dunes. Gowdie's husband was a farm labourer, possibly a cottar, hired by one of the tenants of the Laird of Park; in return for his labour he would have been provided with a cottage and the use of a small parcel of land. According to Wilby, their lifestyle and social status could be compared with present-day developing countries. Unable to read or write, Gowdie possessed a good imagination and the ability to express herself eloquently. Her daily life was spent in basic household chores and tasks such as milking, making bread, weaving yarn or weeding.

== Confessions ==
Gowdie made four confessions over a period of six weeks; the first is dated 13 April 1662 at Auldearn. It is uncertain why she came forward; the historian John Callow, who authored her Oxford Dictionary of National Biography article, (Note: Gowdie is one of only a handful of witches who have an entry in their own right.) suggests it was because of her involvement in a conspiracy to torment the local minister, Harry Forbes, a zealous extremist who had a fear of witchcraft. Forbes was a witness at each of Gowdie's four interrogations. Accusations against Gowdie would have circulated for a lengthy period before she confessed. She would have been detained in solitary confinement, most probably in the tolbooth in Auldearn, throughout the six-week time span of her confessions.

Her first confession described an encounter with the Devil after she arranged to meet him in the kirk at Auldearn at night. Naming several others who attended including Janet Breadhead (Note: Janet Breadhead was detained at Inshoch Castle and confessed to witchcraft the day after being named in Gowdie's first confession. Various spellings are used for her name: in Gowdie's confession, it is spelled Breadhead whereas her own confession gives her name as Breadheid.) and Margret Brodie, she said she renounced her baptism and the Devil put his mark on her shoulder then sucked blood from it. Other meetings took place at several locations, for instance Nairn and Inshoch. She touched on having sexual intercourse with the Devil who she described as a very cold "meikle, blak, roch man". He had forked and cloven feet that were sometimes covered with shoes or boots. Details were given of taking a child's body from a grave and spoiling crops together with information about covens and where they danced. She explained that brooms were laid beside her husband in his bed so he would not notice she was absent. The coven ate and drank the best of food at houses they reached by flying through the air on magical horses and entered via the windows. They were entertained by the Queen of the Fairies, also known as the Queen of Elphame, in her home at Downie Hill (Note: One of a series of mounds near Nairn.) which was filled with water bulls that frightened her. Gowdie claimed to have made clay effigies of the Laird of Park's male children to cause them suffering or death and that she had assumed the form of a jackdaw and, with other members of the coven who had transformed into animals like cats and hares, visited the house of Alexander Cumings. Some parts of her testimony, like her description of the king and queen of fairies, has been cut short when the notaries have just noted et cetera, a frequent occurrence when the material was deemed irrelevant or, if it did not comply with the inference the interrogators intended, it was abruptly ended. Alternatively it may have happened when the scribes were unable to keep pace with the volume of information being narrated by Gowdie.

To turn into a hare Gowdie would chant:

I shall go into a hare,
With sorrow and sych and meickle care;
And I shall go in the Devil's name,
Ay while I come home again. (Note: sych: sighs; meickle: great.)

To change back, she would say:

Hare, hare, God send thee care.
I am in a hare's likeness now,
But I shall be in a woman's likeness even now.

— Pitcairn, 1833.

A little over two weeks later, on 3 May 1662, Gowdie's second confession was transcribed. She expanded on details about the coven by providing the nicknames of its members and as many of the spirits that waited on them as she could remember; her own servant spirit, dressed in black, was called the Read Reiver. Claims included having the ability to transform into animals with the individual chants used to turn into a cat, horse or various other animals supplied. Over the duration of all her confessions a total of twenty-seven benevolent or malevolent chants were given, more than in any other British witchcraft case; three were transcribed twice but with significant differences.

Gowdie testified the Devil handmade elf arrows that were then enhanced by small roughly-spoken "elf-boys". (Note: Henderson and Cowan suggest Gowdie may have been alluding to a brownie or trow-like fairy when describing the elf-boys.) The Devil allocated a number of arrows to each coven member with instructions they were to be fired in his name; no bows were supplied so the arrows were flicked by thumb. The witches were not always accurate when they fired the arrows but if the intended target, whether it was a woman, a man or an animal, was touched by the implement, she claimed they would die even if wearing a protective armour. Spells used to inflict illness and torment on Harry Forbes, the minister, were also described.

On 15 May 1662 Gowdie was brought before her interrogators for a third time. Like her first and second confessions, and in common with many other Scottish witchcraft testimonies, the transcript begins by detailing her pact with the Devil after she encountered him and agreed to meet him at Auldearn kirk. Taking the information she provided previously about the elf arrows a step further, she revealed the names of those killed, expressing regret for the deaths she caused and supplied names of other coven members with details of who they had murdered too. She gave an account of the Devil sending her on an errand to Auldearn disguised as a hare. Her narrative went on to describe how while in that form she was chased by a pack of dogs; she escaped from them by running from house to house until eventually she had the opportunity to utter the chant to transform herself back into a human. She added that sometimes the dogs would be able to bite a witch when she took the form of a hare; although the dogs could not kill the shapeshifter, the bite marks and scars would still be evident once the human form was reinstated.

Descriptions of dining with the Devil and his beating of coven members and their responses to it are recounted. Salacious details concerning sexual relations with the Devil together with broad characteristics of his genitalia are chronicled. Continuing on from the tale in her first testimony about the methods undertaken to kill any male children of the Laird of Park, the verse the Devil had taught them to chant while burning the effigies was relayed.

The fourth and final confession, dated 27 May 1662, is, according to the historian Robert Pitcairn who first reproduced Gowdie's testimonies in 1833, basically to confirm the three previous testimonies coupled with an attempt to elicit more information about the members of the coven to enable charges to be brought against them. Forty-one people were arrested as the result of Breadhead and Gowdie's statements.

== Aftermath ==
The panel of interrogators felt there was ample evidence to secure a conviction against Gowdie so they applied to the Privy Council in Edinburgh seeking a Commission of Justiciary for a local trial to be held. Together with the confession of her accomplice, Janet Breadhead, some or all of Gowdie's confessions were sent with the request. According to Wilby, it is likely the confessions were received in Edinburgh around the middle of June 1662; the Register of the Privy Council for July contains an entry instructing the Sheriff principal of Nairn, Sir Hew Campbell of Calder [Cawdor], and others to arrange local trials for both women.

Gowdie's second testimony has a note on the back dated 10 July 1662 indicating the document had been appraised and the justice department found it germane; a further instruction was added to "Tak ceare of this peaper". On the same document the justice depute, Alexander Colville, (Note: Colville had served as commissioner to the General Assembly of the Church of Scotland and was a staunch Presbyterian; despite voicing some disbelief regarding witchcraft, he sentenced many witches to death.) added a signed statement beside the witness signatures endorsing the commission. Lord Brodie was likely to have been involved in approving the commission; he was in Edinburgh at the time and he noted in his diary that he had been "excisd in ordouring the depositions of witches". (Note: The Brodie family were prominent landowners around Loch Loy and Auldearn; Lord Brodie had been a commissioner to the General Assembly of the Church of Scotland, presided over witchcraft trials and left diaries covering the period 1652–1680 that detail several aspects of witches and justice at the time.) The entry in his diary the following day describes a meeting with Colville when they discussed witches and he mentions "Park's witches". Brodie was highly thought of by the minister and the lairds from the Auldearn area who had asked for his intervention on prior occasions. His relative, the Laird of Lethen, was a witness at Gowdie's interrogations and visited Brodie at the time; he was probably the person who took the trial application to Edinburgh. The pair prayed together petitioning against the Devil and witchcraft.

On 10 April 1662 the Privy Council had issued a proclamation prohibiting torture being used as a means of securing confessions from witches unless it was specifically authorised by the council. This led to a caution frequently being appended to commissions. In Gowdie and Breadhead's case, the Council advised they should be found guilty only if the confessions had been volunteered without torture, that they were sane and without a wish to die.

There is no record of Gowdie being executed although this is not unusual as in 90 per cent of Scottish cases the outcome is unknown due to the local records no longer existing. Wilby hypothesises that once the commission was returned to Auldearn, Gowdie and Breadhead would have been found guilty at a local trial in mid-July, transported by cart to Gallowhill on the outskirts of Nairn where they would have been strangled and burned. Prior to 1678 most Scottish witches tried under a Privy Council commission were convicted and executed; Pitcairn shared the opinion that Gowdie and Breadhead were executed and most modern day academics, like historian Brian P. Levack, agree it would be the likely outcome. The possibility the pair may have been acquitted on the basis of mental impairment has been put forward by some historians; Callow suggests they may have been freed under the clauses attached to the commission and then been permitted to return to "quiet obscurity".

== Modern interpretations ==
The confessions are a blend of fairy and demonic beliefs without parallel in any other witchcraft case. They are more detailed than most and are inconsistent with much of the folklore and records from the witchtrials. It is unclear whether Gowdie's confessions are the result of psychosis, whether she had fallen under suspicion of witchcraft or sought leniency by confessing. Locally it has been suggested she may have suffered ergotism, which can produce hallucinations and other mental instability. At least two other confessions from the 16th century, those of Andro Mann (Note: The name Andrew Mann is sometimes used.) and Allison Peirson, (Note: Mann, from Rathven in Aberdeenshire, was convicted in early 1598; Peirson's case was at Boarhills, Fife in 1588.) reported encounters with the Queen of Elphame; later, in 1670, Jean Weir from Edinburgh, also claimed she met the fairy queen.

Gowdie's confessions formed the crux of historian Margaret Murray's thesis about covens consisting of thirteen members; Murray also asserted cults were structured this way throughout Europe although her work was later discredited. Wilby opines there may have been dark shamanic aspects contained in the fairy elements. Despite the Privy Council's April 1662 proclamation, torture was often still employed and Levack speculates some form of it may have been applied to Gowdie; she may have become unbalanced by the imprisonment and lengthy inquisitions. While kept in solitary confinement, she was probably prevented from sleeping and mistreated. Scholars, such as Callow and Diane Purkiss, suggest Gowdie's narratives about sumptuous meals are indicative of a woman who was continually hungry; other details may be evidence of a powerless woman, angry and sexually frustrated by the austerity imposed by the ministers. Church and court records show rape as a recurrent crime during civil unrest and in the mid-16th century; Gowdie described her first carnal experience with the Devil as being in 1647 when soldiers may still have been in the area and Wilby postulates the lurid sexual details may be Gowdie's "fantasy-response to the trauma of rape."

Wilby characterises Gowdie as a survivor of conflicts like the Battle of Auldearn, who experienced the wrath of zealous, bigoted, ministers and local elite that were frightened of witches; she was a skilled story-teller who entertained relatives and friends with narratives of the supernatural. She suggests the tales recorded may have been the result of a talented orator responding to a "rapt audience".

Levack describes Gowdie's initial statement as "one of the most remarkable documents in the history of witchcraft" with academic Julian Goodare referring to her as "one of the most famous of all Scottish witches" whose "extraordinary confessions" include "some of the most remarkable [visionary activities] on record". These modern day descriptions mirror those of Pitcairn in 1833 and George F. Black in 1937 who wrote in the Calendar of Witchcraft in Scotland that "This is the most remarkable witchcraft case on record ... referred to, in more or less detail, in every work relating to witchcraft in Scotland." According to Wilby, the confessions still remain at the forefront of academics debating witchcraft.

== In literature, art and music ==
Gowdie and her magic have been remembered in a number of later works of culture. She appears as a character in the biographical novels The Devil's Mistress by novelist and occultist J. W. Brodie-Innes, Isobel by Jane Parkhurst, Bitter Magic, by Nancy Kilgore, Isobel Gowdie, by Martin Dey, and the fantasy novel Night Plague by Graham Masterton. In the 21st century, her story has been the inspiration for plays, radio broadcasts and lectures.

The Confession of Isobel Gowdie is a work for symphony orchestra by the Scottish composer James MacMillan; he believed Gowdie's confession was obtained by torture, and that she was burned at the stake for witchcraft. In a broadcast by BBC Radio 3 in 2010 he styled the composition as his requiem for her. The Sensational Alex Harvey Band song 'Isobel Goudie' was one of many commemorating her.

The traditional English folk singer Fay Hield has set a selection of Gowdie's transformation chants to music in the song 'Hare Spell' from her 2020 album Wrackline.

The American heavy metal band King 810 features Gowdie's alleged chant in their song Isobel.

In 2023, there was an exhibition of thirteen figures, Witches in Words, not Deeds, created by Carolyn Sutton. Gowdie was one of the figures exhibited at Edinburgh's Central Library.

In 2025, Pagan folk band Faun released the Song "Hare Spell" which featured the first part of Gowdie's chant in the lyrics.

"The Retraction" is a 2026 work for soprano, small chorus, and mixed ensemble by composer Davide Verotta. The work "serves partly as a timely warning of the perils of irrational thought and uncheked power, but mainly seeks to give voice to IsobeI Gowdie — a young woman at the bottom of the social order, destroyed by the wheels of a brutal and unjust society". First performed with Amy Foote in the lead role on April 24, 2026, San Francisco, CA, USA.

== See also ==
- Cunning folk in Britain
