= John Kincaid (witch-pricker) =

- Occupation: Witch-pricker
- Years active: 1649–1662
- Era: Scottish witch hunts of mid 17th century
- Known for: Renowned for witch-pricking in Great Scottish Witch Hunts and condemning accused women to be tortured and executed

John Kincaid (fl. 1649–1662) was a Scottish witch-pricker and a key figure in the Great Scottish Witch Hunts of 1649–1650 and 1661–1662.

== Biography ==
John Kincaid was based primarily in Tranent and earned his living from 'unmasking' witches in the localities of Tranent, Dalkeith, Dirleton, Forfar, and Kinross.

His dates of birth and death are unknown and little is known of his personal life. He is first mentioned in records in June 1649, when he acted as pricker in the witchcraft trials of Patrick Watson and his wife Menie Haliburton in the Great Hall at Dirleton Castle, near North Berwick.It can be deduced from the records that his professional status was already established by then.

John Kinkaid pricked the accused with a bodkin and was paid £6 for "brodding" Margaret Dunholm, with £4 expenses for wine and food. The bodkin used was also called a "brod".

He is regularly identified as a witch-pricker in court documents from 1649 to 1662, when his career came to a sudden end after the Privy Council found him guilty of fraud and deceit.

Kincaid managed to secure bail after spending just over two months in prison, but did so on the condition that he would not engage in any further torture or pricking.
