= Marion Walker =

Marion Walker (flourished c. 1590s) fought against the prosecutors of The Great Scottish Witch Hunt of 1597. Walker leaked documents about the witch trials to the public, wanting those involved in it to be held accountable. Walker resisted Protestantism, and later in life supported the Catholic priest, John Ogilvie. Walker was discovered by Daniel Macleod from the University of Manitoba; he discovered Walker through researching the resistance of Glasgow's Catholics.

== The Great Scottish Witch Hunt of 1597 ==
Walker acted as a whistleblower in the witch hunts. When Margaret Aitken (the great witch of Balwearie) confessed she had lied and was burned at the stake for fraud, Walker spread the confession to people throughout the city of Glasgow to show that Aiken was a fraud and to turn public opinion against the Scottish Witch Hunts.
