= Margaret Dunholm =

Scottish woman accused of witchcraft

Margaret Dunholm was a Scottish woman from Burncastle near Lauder who was accused of witchcraft and executed in 1649.

Her surname was also written as "Denholm, "Dinham" and "Dolmoune".

She was accused during the Great Scottish witch hunt of 1649–50. She was accused by Isobel Thompson from Stow, who was said to be a witch with a male accomplice.

John Kinkaid, a witch finder from Tranent who pricked the accused with a bodkin was paid £6 for "brodding" Margaret Dunholm, with £4 expenses for wine and food. The bodkin used was also called a "brod".

A record of the expenses of her trial and execution was first printed in 1797. Two barrels of tar were used to build the fire. The execution was supervised by the hangman of Haddington.
