= Christian Caldwell =

Scottish cross-dressing witch-hunter

Christian Caldwell aka John Dickson
- Citizenship: Scottish
- Years active: 1660s
- Known for: Witch-hunter

Christian Caldwell (Caddell) was a cross-dressing witch-hunter active in Morayshire, Scotland during the 1660s.

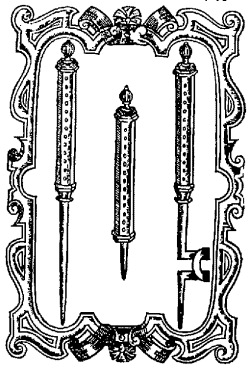
Witch-pricking Needles

== Biography ==
Caldwell signed a contract with the shire of Moray (Elgin) under her alias John Dickson, . Her true identity is unknown but as witch-pricking was a trade for men she disguised herself as a man to pursue her career.

=== Witch-pricking ===
Caldwell formed her first contract with the Baillie of Spynie, John Innes, and was granted to live in the shire for one year and in turn would identify witches for a salary of 6 shillings a day. A practice for her identification of witches was testing for the devil's mark:

"[A] spot on the body where a pin could be slipped in without bleeding or pain".

Isobel Gowdie, a Scottish woman who confessed to witchcraft at Auldearn near Nairn during 1662, might have been one of her victims. The practice involved stripping and shaving the victim completely and pushing the pin in repeatedly until the right spot was found.

=== Accusations and sentence ===
In Tain she wrongly accused John Hay, an influential court messenger who ordered her arrest. Dickson was accused of witchcraft and interrogated in Edinburgh on 30 August 1662 on the basis of "false accusation, torture, and causing death of innocent people in Moray". Her true gender was discovered. She was banished to a fever-subjected plantation in Barbados on 4 May 1663, the day her last victim was burnt in Forres.
