= Margaret Bane =

Scottish midwife (1542–1597) condemned for witchcraft

Margaret Bane also called Clerk (1542 – 25 March 1597), was a Scottish midwife and prominent victim of The Great Scottish Witch Hunt of 1597.

Margaret Bane lived in Kincardine O'Neil, Aberdeen, Scotland with her husband. Together they had two children, a son, Duncan Gardyn, and a daughter, Helen Rogie. Both children lived in Aberdeen alongside their parents. Bane made her career being a midwife and was well-respected for her skills. She had a clientele stretching from the peasantry to members of the nobility. She was accused of witchcraft in 1567, but managed to avoid a trial until 1597. She was executed that same year.

== Trial ==
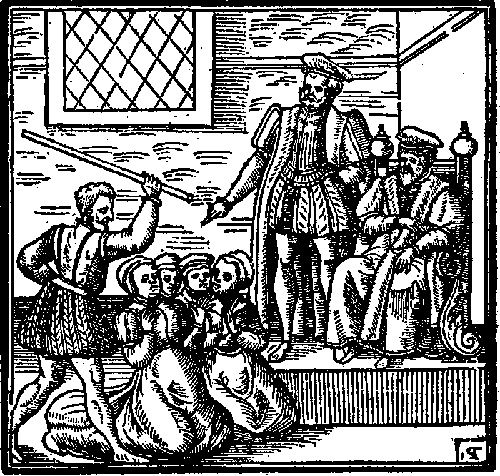
An image from King James VI book, Daemonologie, which aided in the Great Scottish Witch Hunt of 1597.

She was originally accused of witchcraft in 1567, due to association with Jonet Spaldarge, her sister. She avoided trial until the Great Scottish Witch Hunt of 1597. She was accused again in 1596 but was acquitted. In 1597, eight women accused of sorcery identified her as their accomplice. These women all lived and worked together, so it was not uncommon for them to identify each other while on trial. Bane was accused of several charges, including association with a convicted witch, her sister Jonet Spaldarge, and her extensive knowledge of midwifery. She was also accused of having killed her former spouse by transferring the labour pains from a woman to him, of not returning a greeting of a man who died later that day, of having been witnessed to perform magic rituals by a loch, and of having predicted the sex of an infant prior to birth.

Before her death, Bane seems to have denounced multiple women: Christiane Arcly, Jonat Davidsone, Jonat Lucas, Margrat Og, Issobell Oige, Issobell Richie, Beatrix Robbie and her own daughter Helene Rogie. Of those accused, Christiane Arcly was the only one not found guilty and was not executed. Issobell Richie, one of the accused witches identified by Bane, claimed she went to meetings with the devil alongside Bane. Bane never confirmed these accusations but she did confess to performing malefic, spells of evil intent, with Issobell Richie. Bane confessed that her sister Jonet had taught her magic and made her a follower of the Devil. She claimed they even shared a vision of a headless man.

Her third time being accused occurred on 25 March 1597, and was the trial that ultimately lead to her death. Despite being protected by powerful connections, such as Lady Ross of Auchlossan, who bribed clerks to hide the previous charge, she was trialed, judged guilty and executed by burning at Aberdeen in March 1597.

== Family involvement ==
Helen Rogie was the daughter of Margaret Bane and the niece of Jonet Spaldarge. Just like her mother, Helen lived in Aberdeen where she was married to a Johne Straquhan. Helen also has a daughter-in-law, Bessie. It is believed Helen was implicated for witchcraft due to her mother, Margaret. Some of the accusations against her included: conspiring with her mother to inflict an illness upon her daughter-in-law Bessie, causing a neighbour's animals to run wild before dying, and for casting a stone circle. A neighbour saw her performing a ritual at this stone circle and called her out, before dying shortly after. Rogie was accused of witchcraft on 4 April, 1597, and was found guilty on 24 April, 1597. She was sentenced to execution by hanging and burning, which took place later the 24th. She was burned on the Hills of Aberdeen.

Jonet Spaldarge was the sister of Margaret Bane and was recognised as a "good wife". Issobell Richie, a witch accused by Bane, denounced Spaldarge and declared that she had gifted a belt capable of harming bearded men. Margaret also claimed the she was introduced to witchcraft by Spaldarge. Jonet was burned in Edinburg for after being found guilty of sorcery.

== Post-trial ==
After Bane's execution in March, the Great Scottish Witch Hunt of 1597 continued for multiple months. The Hunt ended by the following October and an estimated 200 women were executed by the end of the year. Margaret Bane was one of the first to be executed in this Hunt. Of the multiple witch hunts that occurred in Scotland, this Hunt was the least documented. Although the cause of the Great Scottish Witch Hunt of 1597 is disputed, the plague and famine assisted in the widespread support of this Hunt. The nation was suffering and the Hunt provided people a way to "make sense" of their lives.

The occurrences of this Hunt were not abnormal despite the short time frame. Women who were accused of witchcraft often accused women from their local areas of witchcraft. These women often lived alongside each other and were familiar with one another. Turning on one's neighbour was a common occurrence for witch hunts.

== Sources ==
- Elizabeth Ewan, Sue Innes & Sian Reynolds, The Biographical Dictionary of Scottish Women: From the Earliest Times to 2004
