= Brian P. Levack =

American professor

Brian Paul Levack (born 1943) is an American historian of early modern Britain and Europe.

He received his B.A. (summa cum laude) from Fordham University in 1965, and then both his M.A. (1967) and Ph.D. (1970) from Yale. In 1969 he joined the History Department of the University of Texas at Austin, where he is now the John E. Green Regents Professor Emeritus in History. His research interests centre on the history of the law, the relationship between law and politics in early modern Britain, the formation of the British state, witch-hunting, and demonic possession.

Levack is most widely known for his book The Witch-Hunt in Early Modern Europe (4th edition, 2016), a comparative survey of witch-hunting throughout the early modern world that has been translated into eight languages. His book, The Devil Within: Possession and Exorcism in the Christian West (2013), challenges the commonly held belief that possession signals physical or mental illness and argues that demoniacs and exorcists—consciously or not—are following their various religious cultures, and their performances can only be understood in those contexts. His most recent book, Distrust of Institutions in Early Modern Britain and America, covers the period from 16th to the 21st centuries.Levack has also edited more than twenty books, including The Witchcraft Sourcebook (2nd edition, 2015) and The Oxford Handbook of Witchcraft in Early Modern Europe and Colonial America (2013).

The recipient of a Guggenheim Fellowship in 1975, Levack was appointed Scholar in Residence at the Frances Lewis Law Center, Washington and Lee University School of Law, in 1994. At Texas he was admitted to the Academy of Distinguished Teachers in 2004, and in 2011 he received the University of Texas Regents Outstanding Teaching Award. Levack taught courses on early modern British and European history, legal history, and the history of witchcraft. For eight years he was chair of his department.

== Select bibliography ==
=== Books ===
- The Civil Lawyers in England, 1603-1641: A Political Study. Oxford: Clarendon Press, 1973.
- The Formation of the British State: England, Scotland and the Union, 1603-1707. Oxford: Clarendon Press, 1987.
- Witch-Hunting in Scotland: Law, Politics and Religion. London: Routledge, 2008.
- The Devil Within: Possession and Exorcism in the Christian West. New Haven and London: Yale University Press, 2013.
- The West: Encounters and Transformations (with Edward Muir, Michael Maas, and Meredith Veldman). New York: Pearson Longman, 2004. 2nd edition 2006, 3rd ed. 2010, 4th ed. 2013, 5th ed.,2016.
- The Witch-Hunt in Early Modern Europe. London: Longman, 1987; 2nd ed. 1995; 3rd ed. 2006; 4th ed. Routledge, 2016.
- Distrust of Institutions in Early Modern Britain and America. Oxford: Oxford University Press, 2022; paperback 2023.

=== Books edited ===
- The Jacobean Union: Six Tracts of 1604. Co-edited with Bruce Galloway. Edinburgh: Scottish History Society, 1985.
- Articles on Witchcraft, Magic and Demonology: A Twelve-Volume Anthology of Scholarly Articles. New York: Garland, 1992.
- New Perspectives on Witchcraft, Magic and Demonology: A Six-Volume Anthology of Articles. New York: Routledge, 2001.
- The Witchcraft Sourcebook. New York and London: Routledge, 2004, 2nd.ed.,2015.
- The Oxford Handbook of Witchcraft in Early Modern Europe and Colonial America. Oxford: Oxford University Press, 2013.
