= Pricking =

Method of purported witch identification

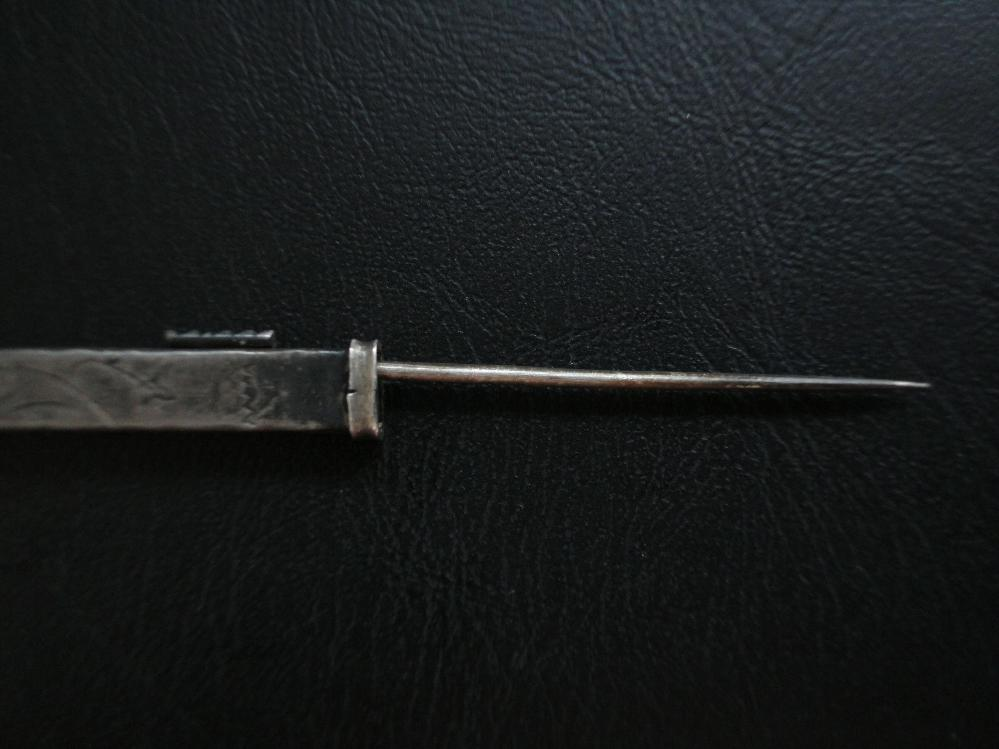
Part of a Scottish witch-pricking needle

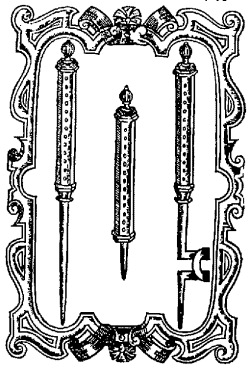
Needles used by street conjurers

During the height of the witch trials of the 16th and 17th centuries, common belief held that a witch could be discovered through the process of pricking their skin with needles, pins and bodkins – daggerlike instruments for drawing ribbons through hems or punching holes in cloth.

This practice derived from the belief that all witches and sorcerers bore a witch's mark that would not feel pain or bleed when pricked. The mark alone was not enough to convict a person, but did add to the evidence. Pricking was common practice throughout Europe. Professional witch finders earned a good living from unmasking witches, travelling from town to town to perform their services. Hollow wooden handles and retractable points have been saved from these finders, which would give the appearance of an accused witch's flesh being penetrated to the hilt without mark, blood, or pain. Other specially designed needles have been found with a sharp end and a blunt end. Through sleight of hand, the sharp end could be used on "normal" flesh, drawing blood and causing pain, while the unseen dull end would be used on a supposed witch's mark.

In 1632, the Privy Council of Scotland examined the case of John Balfour of Corshouse in the Lands of Blacklaw, a pricker who went "athort the country abusing simple and ignorant people for his private gain and commoditie". In 1662, John Kincaid, a well-known pricker from Tranent, was imprisoned by the Privy Council following a series of complaints about his activities; in the previous year he had been granted the freedom of the burgh for his work in Forfar. The Privy Council released Kincaid after nine weeks on the condition that he conducted no further pricking without their permission.

== In literature ==
The pricking of a witch forms significant plot points in John Buchan 1927 novel Witch Wood and in Robert Neill's 1967 novel Witch Bane.

== See also ==
- Witches' mark
- Witch-hunt

== Bibliography ==
- Brian P. Levack, The Witch-Hunt in Early Modern Europe (2nd edn., 1995)
- Gary K. Waite, Heresy, Magic, and Witchcraft in Early Modern Europe (2003)
- Robert W. Thurston, The Witch Hunts: A History of the Witch Persecutions in Europe and North America, 2nd ed. (2007)
- Joseph Klaits, Servants of Satan: the Age of the Witch Hunts (1985)
- Geoffrey R. Quaife, Godly Zeal and Furious Rage: the Witch in Early Modern Europe (1987)
