= Great Scottish Witch Hunt of 1661–1662 =

The Great Scottish Witch Hunt of 1661–1662 was a series of nationwide witch trials that took place across the whole of Scotland during a period of sixteen months from April 1661. At least 660 people were tried for witchcraft and various forms of diabolism.

The exact number of those executed is unknown, largely because they were tried by different legal courts, but is believed to number in the hundreds. Under no other period in Scottish history, possibly with the exception of The Great Scottish Witch Hunt of 1597, were so many tried for witchcraft as during the 1661–1662 witch hunt.

The witch hunt started in Midlothian and East Lothian east of Edinburgh, where 206 people were accused of sorcery between April and December 1661. Subsequently, the authorities appointed commissions to examine the existence of witchcraft in every part of the country. In Forfar, at least 53 men and women were accused of witchcraft of which nine were executed between 1661 and 1662.
