= Great Scottish Witch Hunt of 1597 =

1597 witch trials in Scotland

The Great Scottish Witch Hunt of 1597 was a series of nationwide witch trials that took place in the whole of Scotland from March to October 1597. At least 400 people were put on trial for witchcraft and various forms of diabolism during the witch hunt. The exact number of those executed is unknown, but is believed to be about 200. The Great Scottish Witch Hunt of 1597 was the second of five nationwide witch hunts in Scottish history, the others being the Great Scottish Witch Hunt of 1590–1591, the Great Scottish Witch Hunt of 1628–1631, the Great Scottish Witch Hunt of 1649–1650 and the Great Scottish Witch Hunt of 1661–1662.

== History ==
The Great Scottish Witch Hunt of 1597 is the least documented of the five nationwide Scottish witch hunts. As with the later ones, it was conducted by local courts under the supervision of royal commissions, but in contrast to the others, it was not documented by the central authorities, and the local records are often missing. It is not known what caused the Witch Hunt of 1597, but at the time, Scotland experienced a political conflict between the monarch and the Presbyterian Church, as well as plague and famine. In Edinburgh, a witch trial took place in 1596, when Christian Stewart was accused of having bewitched Patrick Ruthven to death, a case in which the king took a personal interest. This was also the same year as the king James VI published his book about witchcraft, Daemonologie.

In July 1597 James VI spent nine days at St Andrews investigating preaching at the university and attending the trials of witches. There was said to be large number of witches of several sorts (social classes) who had dedicated themselves to the devil and had a witches mark. The English diplomat Robert Bowes heard the trials would be published. In August Bowes heard that a witch MacKolme Anderson and others had attempted to drown the king at Dundee by witchcraft and others had tried to kill Prince Henry.

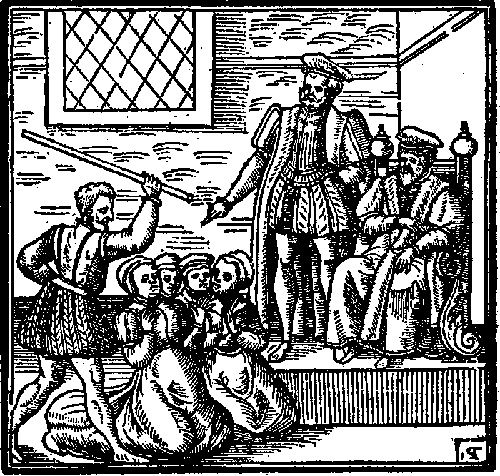
Suspected witches kneeling before King James VI; Daemonologie (1597)

The earliest cases recorded seem to have taken place in Slains north of Aberdeen in March 1597, where the local authorities asked for permission to execute witches. This was followed by a large witch trial in Aberdeen against Janet Wishart and her accomplices. Wishart was alleged to have used a cantrip (spell) to cause one victim to alternately shiver and sweat, bewitched other victims so that they died or nearly died, raised storms via the throwing out of live coals, used "nightmare cats" to inflict horrible dreams, and dismembered a corpse hanging at the gallows. She was executed by burning along with another witch.

Several royal commissions were sent to investigate sorcery in many parts of the country. The witch hunt seem to have been most frequent in Fife, Perthshire, Glasgow, Stirlingshire and especially Aberdeenshire, all between 4 March and October.

The best-known case was that of Margaret Aitken, called The Great Witch of Balwearie. She was likely arrested in Fife in April 1597. After having pleaded guilty under torture, she offered to help the commission to identify witches in all parts of the country in exchange for her life. During a period of four months, the Aitken commission visited several parts of Scotland and many people were arrested, put on trial and executed after having been pointed out by her.

Eventually Aitken was discredited as an expert witness after declaring innocent the same people she had identified as witches when she saw them previously. On 1 August she was stopped, and on 12 August, the commissions were ordered to end the trials until the claims could be better examined.

Bowes wrote on 15 August that, "the King hath been lately pestered and in many wayes troubled in the examination of the witches, which swarme in execeeding number and (as is credibly reported) in many thousands". It was reported on 5 September that James VI remained involved in witch trials. The accused were drawn all social classes; "The King hath his mynd onlie bent upon the examination and tryall of sorcerers, men and women. Such a great number are delated (accused) that it is a wonder, and those not onlie of the meanest sort, but also of the best".

Fewer death sentences seem to have been issued after the execution of Margaret Aitken, and by October the witch hunt seems to have stopped.
