= Barbara Napier =

Scottish woman convicted of witchcraft

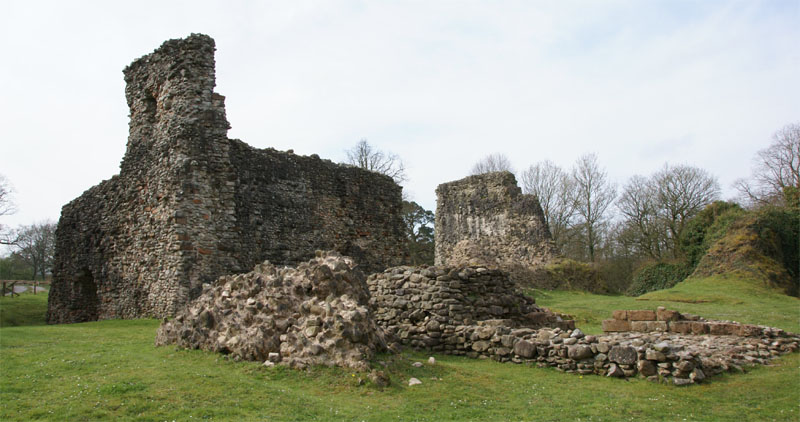
Barbara Napier was said to have asked Agnes Sampson to help her husband during the "Raid of Dumfries" and the siege of Lochmaben Castle

Barbara Napier or Naper was a Scottish woman involved in the 1591 North Berwick witch trials. Details of charges against her survive, and after James VI personally intervened, she was found guilty of consulting with witches however she was not executed.

== Background ==
Barbara Napier may have been a sister or relation of William Napier of Wrychtishousis, a now demolished castle to the south of the centre of Edinburgh, near Bruntsfield. She married a book seller named George Ker in 1572. George Ker died at La Rochelle in 1576, and she then married Archibald Douglas, a burgess of Edinburgh, whose brother Robert Douglas was the laird of Corshogill near Drumlanrig and Durisdeer. Her family included a son and a daughter, Janet Douglas.

The chronicle writer David Moysie wrote that Napier and Euphame MacCalzean were "wemen of guid reputation afoir", meaning they were members of the wealthy classes, and similar remarks appear in other contemporary sources about their good standing in the community. A neo-Latin writer, John Johnston, made a related point, describing them as dignitate formae haud degeneres, not degenerate in form, while a narrative about the trials, Newes from Scotland, says they "were reputed for as civill honest women as any that dwelled within the Cittie of Edenbrough before they were apprehended".

The witchcraft trials and accusations in 1591 were connected with the recent voyage of James VI to meet Anne of Denmark, which was troubled by "contrary winds" and a political controversy involving Francis Stewart, 5th Earl of Bothwell. Accusations against Barbara Napier also related to her husband's role in actions taken against John Maxwell, 8th Lord Maxwell in 1588. She was an acquaintance of Archibald Douglas, 8th Earl of Angus and his third wife Jean Lyon, Countess of Angus, and may have worked for them or been close to their household. The allegations or indictments were summarised in points known as "articles of dittay", which were published in 1833 by Robert Pitcairn.

=== William Napier ===
William Napier of Wrichtishousis also had a connection with the business affairs of Jean Lyon, Countess of Angus. In February 1590, James Lumsden of Airdrie in Crail (died 1598) and William Napier delivered a royal jewel consisting of a diamond in a gold setting worth 2,000 French gold crowns to the Privy Council. They had obtained the jewel from the Countess of Angus, and pledged it on her behalf to an Edinburgh merchant Jacob Barron for a loan, not knowing it was a royal jewel. Twenty years previously, a number of jewels of Mary, Queen of Scots had been marketed or pledged for loans by Regent Moray and William Kirkcaldy of Grange during the Marian Civil War, and this jewel may have left the royal collection at that time. Lumsden, like Barbara Napier, was a supporter of the Earl of Bothwell, and took part in Raid of Falkland in 1592.

Lumsden and Napier were related, William Napier's mother, Jonet Uddert, as a widow, had married Lumsden's uncle. As a merchant burgess of Edinburgh, William Napier was involved in shipping and in 1589 contracted to return Spanish sailors and soldiers stranded in Scotland after the defeat of the Spanish Armada.

== Witchcraft accusations ==
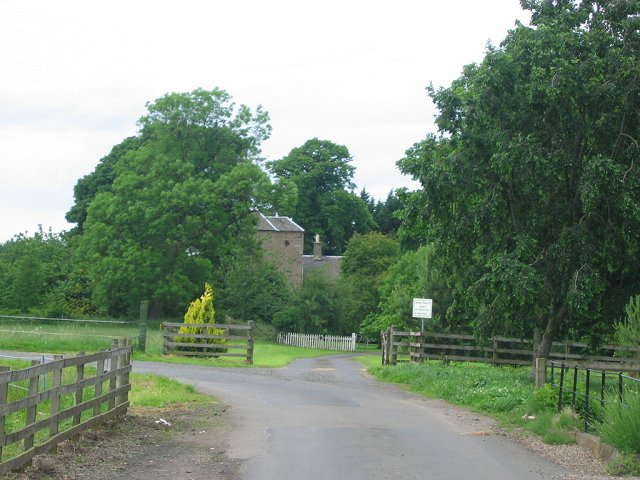
Barbara Napier was associated with the household of the Earl of Angus at Smeaton, close to Dalkeith, where she met with Agnes Sampson

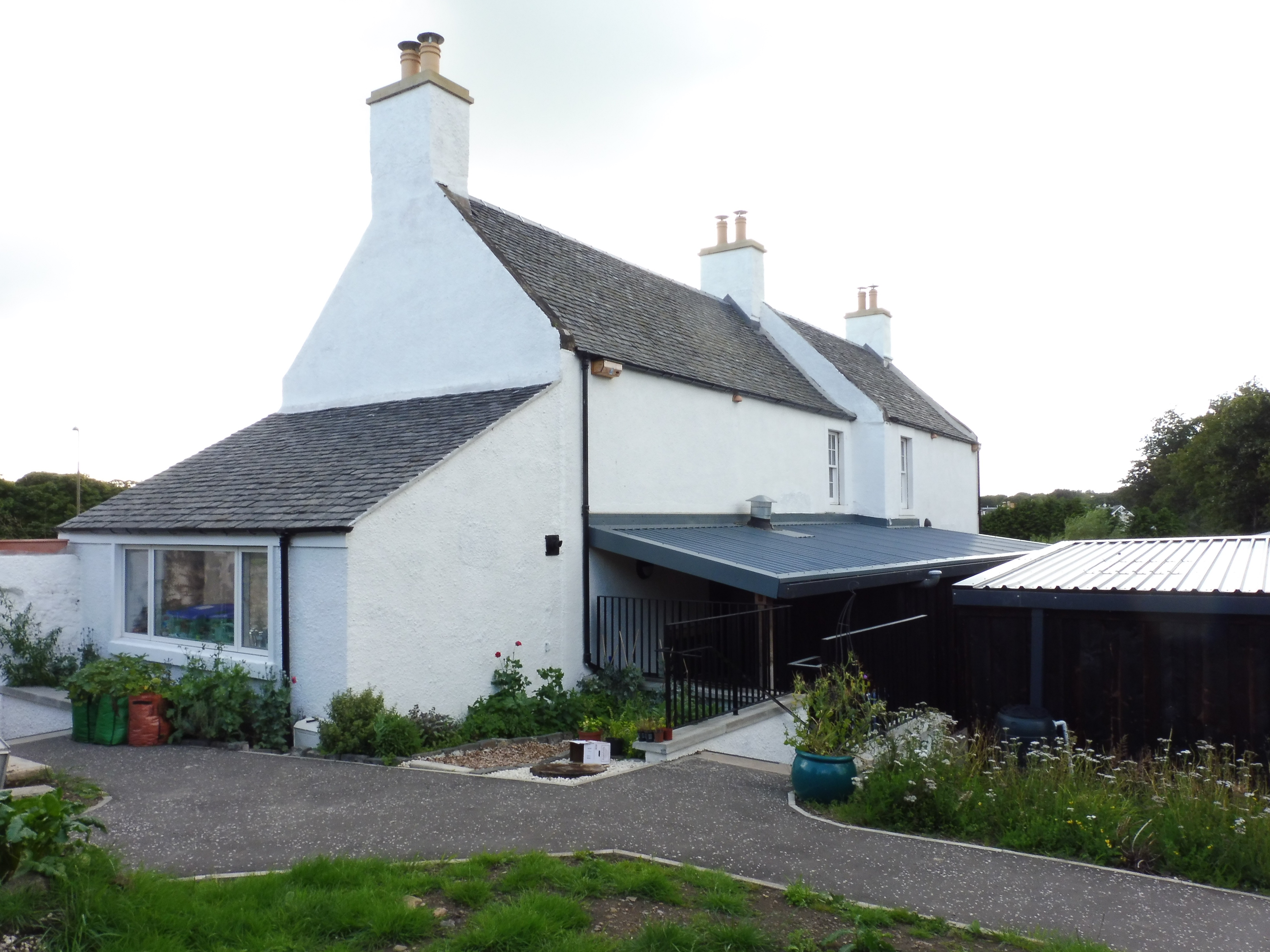
Bridgend Farmhouse near Cameron Toll and the Braid Burn

Geillis Duncan, a woman accused of witchcraft, alleged in her confession that Barbara Napier had caused the illness of Archibald Douglas, 8th Earl of Angus. The Earl was reported to have died from a disease so strange there could be no cure or remedy. He fell ill at Langhope and died at Smeaton near Dalkeith on 4 August 1588. It was said that witches caused his death from sweating and fever by toasting a wax image of him by a fire.

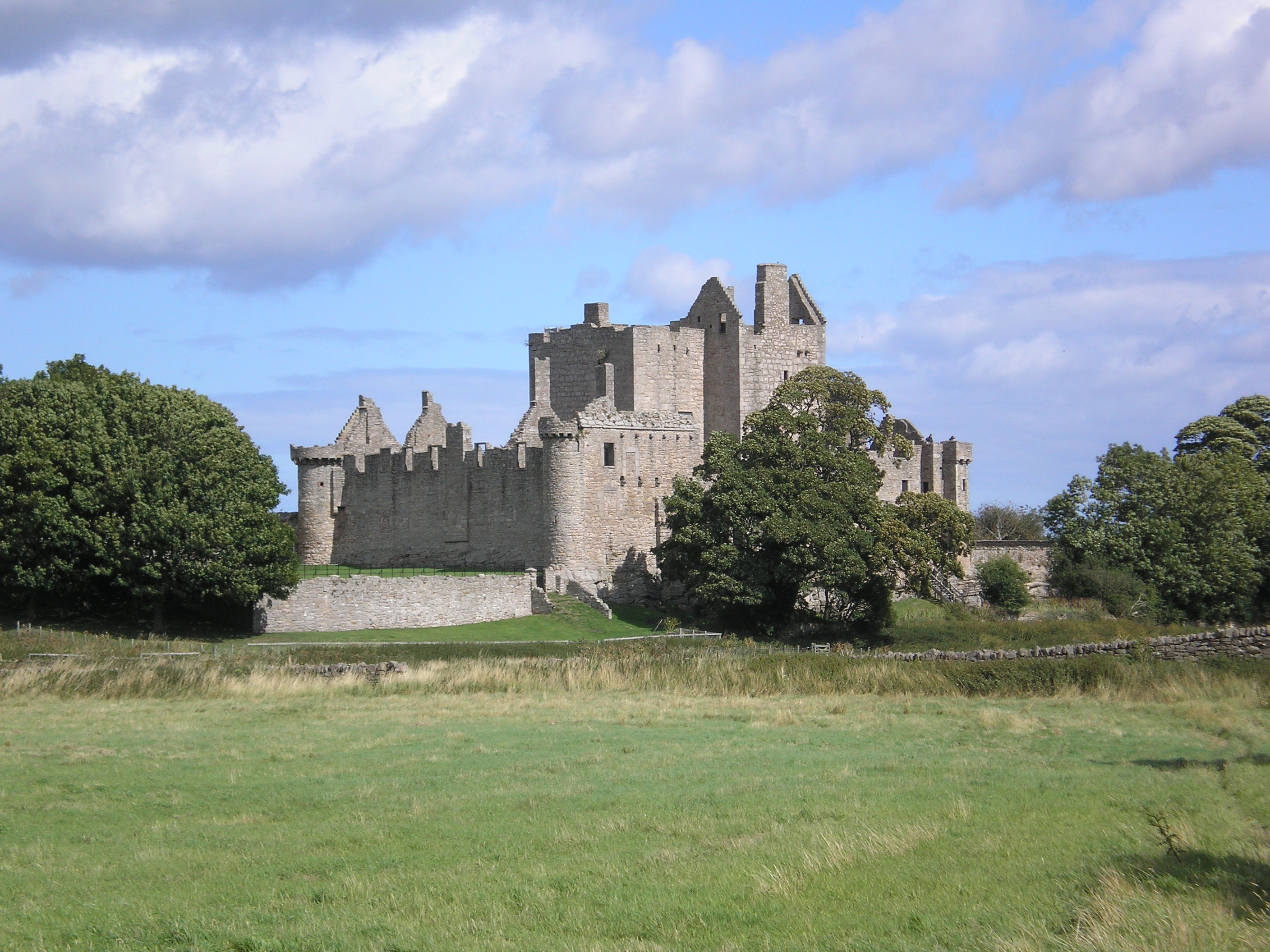
Agnes Sampson was accused of making a wax charm for Barbara Napier and placing it in a dovecote at Craigmillar

Donald Robinson made a confession that Euphame MacCalzean, Barbara Napier, Agnes Sampson and others had attended an assembly of witches at "Atkynson's or Acheson's Haven" where an image of James VI was passed around and given to the devil for the destruction of the king.

Napier was said to have bought charms to help her own health and to try and improve her relationship with Jean Lyon, Countess of Angus. She hoped that Agnes Sampson could prevent Jean Lyon's morning sickness. Sampson was also alleged to have given Barbara Napier a charmed ring set with a stone which would win her Jean Lyon's affection. Agnes Sampson and Barbara Napier met at Dalkeith and "Camroune-brig-end" near the Braid Burn, for friendly talks and to "contract hameliness".

Napier was said to have asked Sampson to protect her husband by magic while he was on military service against the Maxwell family at the "Raid of Dumfries" and at the House of Cowhill at Holywood, during a recent action against Lord Maxwell in May 1588 at the time of the siege of Lochmaben Castle. A brother of David Maxwell of Cowhill was the captain of Lochmaben.

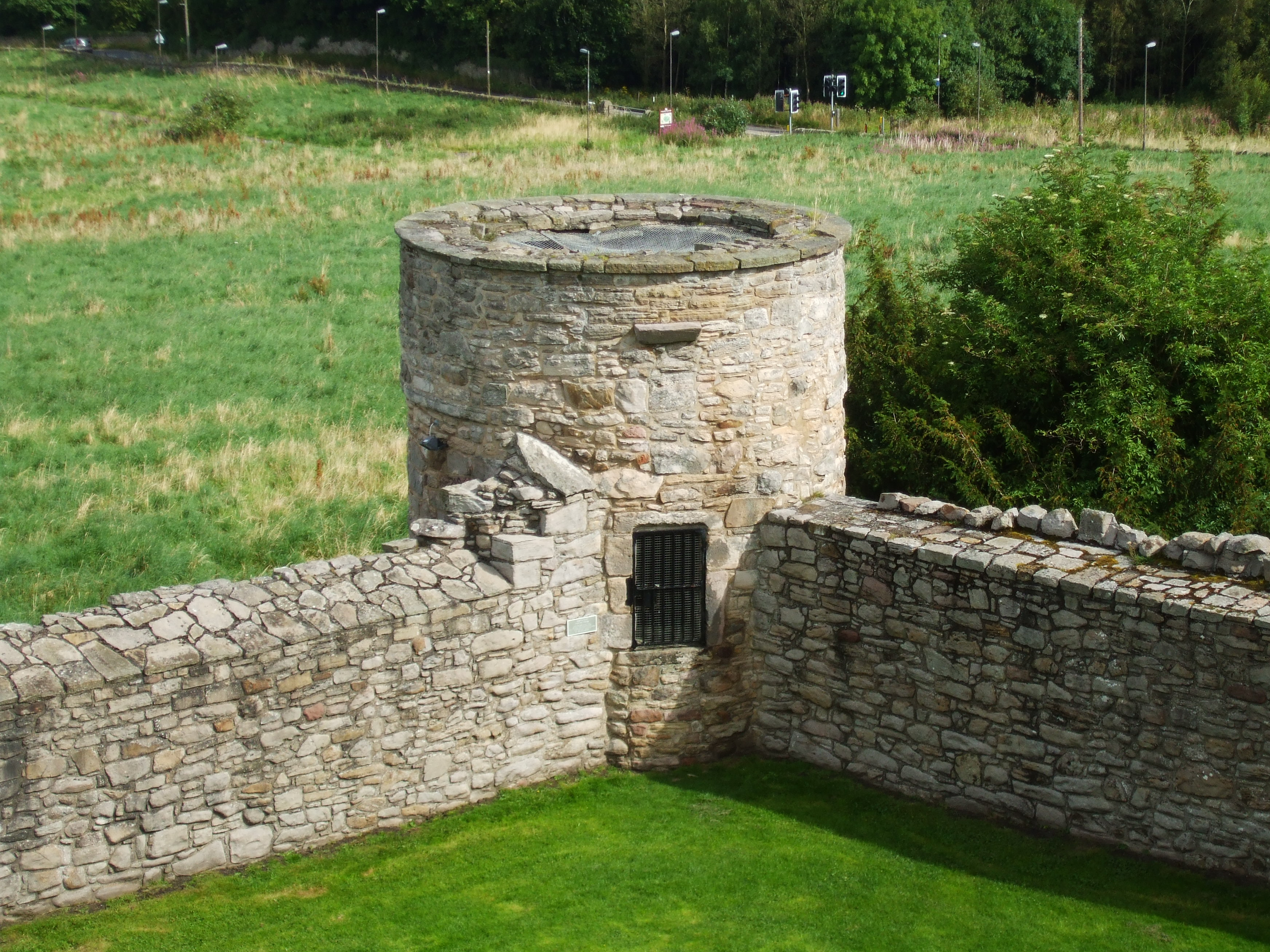
A corner turret at Craigmillar Castle served as a dovecote

Sampson made a charmed wax image to harm an enemy of Barbara Napier and her husband, a man called "Archie", thought to be Archie (Maxwell), a brother of the laird of Cowhill. As part of the charming process, the image of "Archie" was placed in a dovecote in Craigmillar Castle Park. Sampson advised Napier to pay close attention, "tak tent", to the aftercare of the charm. Archibald Maxwell of Cowhill seems to have survived, and a man of that name is mentioned in the Register of the Privy Council in subsequent years.

Barbara Napier was said to have paid for consultations with gifts of textiles, offering to send Sampson a linen "courch" or headcover, and lengths of bombassy and brown broadcloth to Richie Graham, who offered to help her son. Graham also advised her on finding a doublet that had belonged to her late husband, George Ker.

== Trial and verdict ==
The English ambassador in Edinburgh, Robert Bowes, heard that Napier and others were accused of a practice to kill the king by witchcraft and "compassing" the death of the Earl of Angus, and would be tried on 12 April. He heard that she wrote a letter to Francis Stewart, 5th Earl of Bothwell, who was also accused of involvement in witchcraft.

The jurors on her assize found her guilty only of the lesser crime of consulting with witches. She was acquitted of involvement with Sampson in making an image of the Earl of Angus, and attending the alleged convention of witches at North Berwick. This seems to have been because the evidence against her consisted only of testimony from people already found guilty of witchcraft. James VI acknowledged there was "no testimony but of witches". Bowes learnt that the assize debated the case past midnight. Barbara Napier had "many kinsfolk and friends of good credit" and they were able to help and even serve as her jurors on the assize.

James VI was displeased by this verdict, and on 10 May 1591 he wrote to the Justice Clerk Lewis Bellenden to hasten her execution. Her sentence or "doom" was pronounced, and she said she was pregnant. James VI ordered the Chancellor John Maitland of Thirlestane to have her examined by physicians her to see if she was pregnant, and if she was not, to have her burnt and publicly disembowelled. James wrote to Maitland with his instructions to continue questioning Euphame MacCalzean and Ritchie Graham:

Try, by the mediciners' oaths, if Barbara Napier be with bairn or not. Take no delaying answer. If ye find she be not, to the fire with her presently and cause bowel her publicly. Let Effie Makkaillen see the stoup two or three days and upon the sudden stay her in hope of confession if that service adverts. If not, despatch her in the next oulke anis [week, sometime], but not according to rigour of her doom. The rest of the inferior witches, off at the nail with them. But gar see [make sure] that Ritchie Grahme want not his ordinary allowance till I take farther order with him.

The king wanted an appeal to overturn the first verdict against Napier, in order to better prosecute the Earl of Bothwell, and an "assize of error" was planned. James VI spoke to the jurors, who faced penalties for their former decision, on 7 June 1591, and they agreed with his views and were pardoned of their "error". Some members of the original assize were employees of the royal household at Holyroodhouse, including; John Boig, Master Porter, George Boig, Master of the Ale Cellar, and John Seaton, creil-man. Other members were represented by the lawyer John Russell. The lawyers offered some opposition to James VI, arguing that his views confounded a "nice" distinction between civil and criminal law.

Barbara Napier's fate is unclear. The town council bought materials to build a fire for her execution and these were used on 25 June 1591 at the burning of Euphame MacCalzean. The opinion of the 17th-century historian of the Douglas family, David Hume of Godscroft, was that Barbara Napier had been released. Her property was forfeit to the crown by "escheat", and passed to Robert Learmonth and to the Earl of Morton, who arranged that the goods would return to Barbara Napier's daughter.

She was released from custody on 23 February 1592, but not declared innocent and her brother William Napier of Wrychtishouses was her cautioner. Evidence that Barbara Napier was not executed and lived on more than ten years after the trial is provided by the appearance of her name in the Registers of Deeds and the Registers of Decreets, records of legal transactions in the National Records of Scotland and Edinburgh City Archives.
