= Geillis Johnstone =

Scottish woman accused of witchcraft in 1609

Geillis Johnstone was a Scottish woman from Musselburgh accused of witchcraft in 1609 by the Presbytery of Dalkeith. She was acquitted by the Privy Council of Scotland, but faced a retrial in 1614 by the court of the regality of Dunfermline. The Dunfermline court had jurisdiction over the dower lands of Anne of Denmark, including Musselburgh, formerly a property of Dunfermline Abbey. Johnstone was acquitted.

Geillis Johnstone was married to John Duncan (died 1596). However, women in early modern Scotland did not use their husband's surnames after marriage. As such, she should not be confused with Geillis Duncan, a maidservant in Tranent accused of witchcraft in 1591.

Agnes Sampson, a victim of the North Berwick witch trials in 1590, was said to have helped cure an illness of John Duncan. During the 1614 trial of Geillis Johnstone, the charges against her included consulting with "Annie Sampsone" for her husband's care. Geillis was also accused of working with a woman called Irish Jonet to cure the mental illness of Robert Craig, a Musselburgh weaver.

Alexander Seton, 1st Earl of Dunfermline, who presided over the legal business of Anne of Denmark's lands as Bailie of Dunfermline, was prominent in the action of the Privy Council in 1609 and in the acquittal of Geillis Johnstone in 1614. The trial records detail the rejection of many of the allegations as spurious and irrelevant.
