= John Russell (advocate) =

Scottish lawyer and author

John Russell WS (1550–1613) was a Scottish lawyer and author, who acted at witch trials.

== Life ==
Russell's family connections are unclear, but he was probably a relative of the cloth merchant and Edinburgh City Treasurer, Mungo Russell. The kirk minister John Row lodged with John Russell in Edinburgh as a student. Russell's wife was Row's aunt. Russell received a quantity of books that had belonged to his father, the elder John Row, but refused to house the younger Row for his second year. Row's uncle the Laird of Balfour was unable to speak up for him because Russell was his lawyer.

In December 1583, James VI appointed him advocate to Ludovic Stewart, 2nd Duke of Lennox, with a salary of £20 Scots. Two more lawyers were also appointed to manage the Duke's affairs, John Shairp at £30, and Henry Wardlaw at £50.

Russell wrote an address in Latin to Anne of Denmark for her Entry to Edinburgh, published as, Verba Ioann. Russelli iureconsulti pro senatu populoque Edinburgensi habita, ad serenissimam scotorum reginam Annam dum Edinburgum ingreditur 19. Maij. An. 1590 (Edinburgh: Robert Waldegrave, 1590). Russell's speech invoked the memory of Margaret of Denmark, Queen of Scotland who married James III of Scotland. He anticipated the union of Scotland and England. During the ceremony his son was lowered in a globe from the West Port gate to present the keys of Edinburgh to Anne of Denmark.

At the North Berwick Witch Trials in 1591, Russell acted as a "procurator", speaking on behalf of Barbara Napier and Euphame MacCalzean. Russell also spoke for members of the assize of Barbara Napier, who were tried at an "assize of error" for their partial acquittal of Napier.

Russell was a member of a committee of lawyers and ministers including Sir John Preston of Fentonbarns, Robert Rollock and the Provost Henry Nisbet who planned reforms for the High School and drew up a syllabus for the University of Edinburgh in 1598 including readings from Latin authors. In 1604 Russell wrote a tract on further political and institutional union between Scotland and England, A Treatise of the Blissid and Happy Unioun, which circulated in manuscript and was published in 1985. He argues that Scotland ought not to become a "pendicle" of England, but should retain its own legal system and institutions, a proposal which he noted could be found in the old Rough Wooing propaganda tracts of Edward VI and the Duke of Somerset.

As a lawyer, Russell drew up several bonds intended to resolve conflict between families, which were noted by the Privy Council of Scotland, copied into official registers, and preserved.

== Family and the Granton property ==
John Russell married firstly Grissel Armstrong and secondly Marion Carmichael. His son was also named John Russell and a lawyer. Russell owned property at Granton near Edinburgh, and was described as a "portioner of Granton". His house at Wester Granton burnt down in 1602 and Russell had three of his neighbours imprisoned in Edinburgh tolbooth as suspect arsonists. He sold the property to Alexander Gibson of Carnbee in 1603. The house was rebuilt as Granton Castle by a subsequent owner, Sir Thomas Hope, and demolished in 1928.

His sister Janet Russell married the diplomat and intriguer John Colville in July 1572.
