= John Shairp (lawyer) =

Scottish lawyer and businessman

John Schairp of Houston (died 1607) was a Scottish lawyer and businessman.

== Career ==
Schairp studied at the University of St Andrews for the church, but changed careers and became a lawyer. His practice included work for Edinburgh town council and many private clients. He also lent money to aristocrats like John Lyon, 8th Lord Glamis.

Houston House is at Uphall in West Lothian. The lands were called Stathbrock when he bought them in 1569. The lands were erected into a barony for Shairp, but he had to defend his ownership of the property from various claimants. Schairp completed a new Houston House which still stands.

He gave a speech in Latin at the Entry of James VI into Edinburgh in October 1579. James VI appointed him advocate to Ludovic Stewart, 2nd Duke of Lennox in December 1583, with a salary of £30 Scots. Two more lawyers were also appointed to manage the Duke's affairs, John Russell at £20, and Henry Wardlaw at £50.

On 12 July 1593 he acted as proxy for John Maitland of Thirlestane and his wife Jean Fleming when they resigned the barony of Musselburgh to Anne of Denmark.

In 1604 he became involved in a commission to re-draft border law preparatory to the projected union between Scotland and England.

He died in 1607.

== Family ==
John Shairp married firstly, Agnes Moffet. Their children included:

- James Shairp, who was an invalid.
- John Shairp
- Patrick Shairp, Minister of Uphall.
- Anna Shairp, who married William Little.
- Agnes Shairp, who married, secondly, William Hume.

He married secondly Euphemia Acheson, daughter of Alexander Acheson of Gosford, merchant and master of the mint, and Helen Reid, and sister of Mark Acheson of Acheson's Haven. Their children included:

- Alexander Shairp, (d. 1604) while studying at Poitiers.
- Andrew Shairp
- William Shairp
- Euphemia Shairp
- Isobel Shairp, who married Robert Dunbar of Burgie.
- Helen Shairp

He married thirdly Margaret Collace in 1591. She brought lands at Kinloss, Muirton, and Findhorn and salmon fishing rights in pools called the Stells and Yairs. Schairp disputed their rights to these properties with Edward Bruce, 1st Lord Kinloss. When they building at Houston, Margaret Collace wrote to Shairp's secretary in Edinburgh asking about customary payments for the masons. They had asked for "morning and afternoon's drink", probably a reference to "drinksilver".
