= Archibald Douglas, 8th Earl of Angus =

Earl of Angus (1555–1588)

Archibald Douglas, 8th Earl of Angus and 5th Earl of Morton (1555 – 4 August 1588) was a Scottish aristocrat.

== Family background ==
He was the son of David, 7th Earl of Angus. He succeeded to the title and estates in 1558, being brought up by his uncle, James Douglas, 4th Earl of Morton, a Presbyterian.

== Life ==
Archibald Douglas was educated at the University of St Andrews and was tutored at Regent Morton's court by John Provan.

In 1573 he was made a Privy Councillor and Sheriff of Berwickshire; in 1574 Lieutenant-General in Scotland; in 1577 Warden of the West Marches and Steward of Fife; and in 1578 Lieutenant-General of the realm. As a supporter of Morton and "ultra-Protestant" policy he was twice forced in exile in England.

In 1580 Angus gave strong support to Morton during the attack upon the latter, made a vain attempt to rescue him, and was declared guilty of high treason on 2 June 1581. He then entered into correspondence with the English government for an invasion of Scotland to rescue Morton, and on the latter's execution in June, went in exile to London, where he was welcomed by Queen Elizabeth.

After the Raid of Ruthven in 1582, Angus returned to Scotland and was reconciled to King James VI. James was troubled by a rumour in September 1583 that Angus had an armed force and was refortifying Tantallon Castle, but it was discovered that he was only having the castle brew house repaired. Soon afterwards the king shook off the control of the Earls of Mar and Gowrie, and Angus was again banished from Court.

In 1584 he joined the rebellion of Mar and Glamis. Their supporters held Stirling Castle and Mar's Wark in April. The movement failed, and the insurgents fled to Berwick-upon-Tweed. Later they took up residence at Newcastle-upon-Tyne, which became a centre of Presbyterianism and of projects against the Scottish government, encouraged by Elizabeth, who regarded the banished lords as friends of the English and antagonists of the French interest.

In February 1585 they came to London and cleared themselves of the accusation of plotting against James's life. A plan was then prepared for their restoration and for the overthrow of James Stewart, Earl of Arran. In October they invaded Scotland and gained an easy victory over Arran, captured Stirling Castle with the King in November, and secured from him the restoration of their estates and the control of the government.

His Edinburgh residence lay off the Canongate, on its north side, close to where New Street now lies.

In January 1586 he was granted the Earldom of Morton with the lands entailed upon him by his uncle; this made him 5th Earl of Morton. In November 1586 Angus was appointed Warden of the Marches and Lieutenant-General on the Border, with a force of 100 horsemen and 100 foot soldiers, and their officers, drummers and pipers, and "furriers" or quartermasters.

He performed good services in restoring order; but he was unable to overcome the king's hostility to the establishment of Presbyterian government.

== Death ==
In July 1588 it was reported that he had travelled from the west of Scotland "sick of the flux and burning ague." He died on 4 August 1588 at Smeaton, near Dalkeith Palace. He was said to have been buried at Aberdour in Fife, but more likely, he was buried at Abernethy.

As reported in the Newes from Scotland tract of 1591, his death was said to have been caused by witchcraft. His physician found his illness strange and there was no cure or remedy, causing him to languish until his death. During the North Berwick witch trials, Geillis Duncan accused Barbara Napier of causing his death by witchcraft. Euphame MacCalzean, Agnes Sampson, and Richard Grierson were also accused. The Earl of Bothwell admitted that he had sent the cunning man Richie Graham to attend the earl.

== Family ==
The Earl of Angus was married three times: (1) on 13 June 1573 at the Church of the Holy Rude, Mary Erskine, a daughter of the Earl of Mar and Annabell Murray. Her "tocher" or dowry was 8,000 merks; (2) 25 December 1575 at Cupar, (divorced 1587) Margaret, a daughter of George Leslie, 4th Earl of Rothes; (3) 29 July 1587 Jean Lyon, a daughter of John Lyon, 8th Lord Glamis, with whom he had a daughter Margaret, who died unmarried aged 15.

Angus began proceedings to divorce Margaret Leslie in August 1586, which were strongly opposed by the Earl of Rothes who considered he had been Angus's ally during his banishment. A French diplomat in Edinburgh, Camille de Preau, sieur de Courcelles, heard that Angus claimed she had flirted with a stableboy, which was thought unlikely, and the Earl of Bothwell joked he would divorce his wife Margaret Douglas for the same. She was Angus's sister.

He was succeeded in the Earldom of Angus by his cousin William, a descendant of the 5th earl.

A closer line of the Douglas family to the former Earls of Morton inherited the Earldom of Morton. For the Morton title, see James Douglas, 4th Earl of Morton and William Douglas, 6th Earl of Morton.

Peerage of Scotland
Preceded by David Douglas	Earl of Angus; 1558–1588	Succeeded by William Douglas
Preceded by James Douglas (Attainded 1581)	Earl of Morton; 1586–1588	Succeeded by William Douglas
