= List of shipwrecks in January 1833 =

The list of shipwrecks in January 1833 includes ships sunk, foundered, grounded, or otherwise lost during January 1833.

== 1 January ==
List of shipwrecks: 1 January 1833
Ship	State	Description
Industry	United Kingdom	The ship struck a rock and sank in Loch Indaal. Her crew were rescued.
Nelly Christina Wilhelmina	Norway	The ship was driven ashore and damaged 5 nautical miles (9.3 km) from Bergen. Her crew were rescued. She was on a voyage from Lisbon, Portugal to Bergen. Nelly Christina Wilhelmina was refloated in late January and taken in to Bergen for repairs.

== 2 January ==
List of shipwrecks: 2 January 1833
Ship	State	Description
Bon Pére	France	The brig foundered in the English Channel 20 nautical miles (37 km) south of Portland Bill, Dorset, United Kingdom. Her crew survived.

== 3 January ==
List of shipwrecks: 3 January 1833
Ship	State	Description
Jupiter	Hamburg	The ship was wrecked on Alderney, Channel Islands. She was on a voyage from Hamburg to Valparaíso, Chile, and Lima, Peru.
Royal George	United Kingdom	The ship sank at Fishguard, Pembrokeshire. Her crew were rescued.

== 4 January ==
List of shipwrecks: 4 January 1833
Ship	State	Description
Britannia	United Kingdom	The ship was wrecked at Mazara del Vallo, Sicily with the loss of two of her crew. She was on a voyage from Cephalonia, Greece to Palermo, Sicily.
Cotton Plant, Saratoga	United States	The steamboat Cotton Plant was destroyed by fire at New Orleans, Louisiana. The flames spread to Saratoga (United States), which later sank.
John and Peggy	United Kingdom	The ship was driven ashore and wrecked at Fishguard, Pembrokeshire. Her crew were rescued. She was on a voyage from Swansea, Glamorgan to Cardigan.

== 5 January ==
List of shipwrecks: 5 January 1833
Ship	State	Description
Sultana	United States	The ship was driven ashore at Boston, Massachusetts.

== 6 January ==
List of shipwrecks: 6 January 1833
Ship	State	Description
Cecile	France	The ship departed from Nassau, Bahamas for Havre de Grâce, Seine-Inférieure. No further trace, presumed foundered with the loss of all hands.
Hume	United Kingdom	The ship was abandoned off the coast of Newfoundland. Her crew were rescued by Siren (United Kingdom).

== 7 January ==
List of shipwrecks: 7 January 1833
Ship	State	Description
Nancy	United Kingdom	The ship struck a rock and foundered in the Atlantic Ocean off the coast of County Donegal. She was on a voyage from Wick, Caithness to Limerick.

== 8 January ==
List of shipwrecks: 8 January 1833
Ship	State	Description
Julian Sophie	Denmark	The ship foundered off "Listerland". She was on a voyage from Vordingborg to Newcastle upon Tyne, Northumberland, United Kingdom.
Nautilus	United Kingdom	The ship sprang a leak and sank off the Blasket Islands, County Kerry. Her crew were rescued. She was on a voyage from Dingle County Kerry to Cork.

== 9 January ==
List of shipwrecks: 9 January 1833
Ship	State	Description
Astrologo	Ottoman Empire	The ship ran aground and capsized off Hamburg. She was declared a constructive total loss. Astrologo was on a voyage from Çeşme to Hamburg.
Emilienne	France	The ship was wrecked near Morlaix, Finistère with the loss of all on board. She was on a voyage from Havre de Grâce, Seine-Inférieure to Senegal.
Martha	United Kingdom	The schooner sprang a leak in the Atlantic Ocean off Arranmore, County Donegal and was abandoned by her crew. Presumed to have subsequently foundered. She was on a voyage from Liverpool, Lancashire to Newfoundland, British North America.

== 10 January ==
List of shipwrecks: 10 January 1833
Ship	State	Description
Dove	United Kingdom	The ship was wrecked on the coast of São Miguel, Azores, Portugal. She was on a voyage from São Miguel to "Villa France".
Elizabeth	United Kingdom	The ship was driven ashore and sank 4 nautical miles (7.4 km) from Caernarfon. Her crew were rescued. She was on a voyage from Bangor, Caernarfonshire to Bristol, Gloucestershire.
Neptune	France	The ship was wrecked at Sète, Hérault. She was on a voyage from Paimbœuf, Loire-Inférieure to Marseille, Bouches-du-Rhône.

== 11 January ==
List of shipwrecks: 11 January 1833
Ship	State	Description
Tartar	United Kingdom	The ship was driven ashore and severely damaged at Douglas, Isle of Man.

== 12 January ==
List of shipwrecks: 12 January 1833
Ship	State	Description
Enigheit	Russia	The ship was driven ashore at Fedderwarden, Kingdom of Hanover.
Flora	United Kingdom	The ship struck the Dulas Rock, in the Irish Sea off Anglesey and was wrecked. Her crew were rescued. She was on a voyage from Liverpool, Lancashire to Wexford.
Louisa	United States	The ship was driven ashore at Fedderwarden.
Unity	United Kingdom	The ship foundered in the Bristol Channel off Lundy Island, Devon. Her crew were rescued. She was on a voyage from Bury, Lancashire to Barnstaple, Devon.

== 13 January ==
List of shipwrecks: 13 January 1833
Ship	State	Description
Elena	Norway	The ship was wrecked near Venice, Kingdom of Lombardy–Venetia. She was on a voyage from Bergen to venice.
Isabella	United Kingdom	The ship was driven ashore on Sanda Island, Argyllshire. She was on a voyage from Glasgow, Renfrewshire to Dunkirk, Nord, France.

== 14 January ==
List of shipwrecks: 14 January 1833
Ship	State	Description
Leonidas	United Kingdom	The ship was wrecked on the Goodwin Sands, Kent. Her crew were rescued. She was on a voyage from Newcastle upon Tyne, Northumberland to Nantes, Loire-Inférieure, France.

== 15 January ==
List of shipwrecks: 15 January 1833
Ship	State	Description
Henrys	United Kingdom	The ship was driven ashore and wrecked on the coast of the Isle of Wight. Her crew were rescued. She was on a voyage from Sunderland, County Durham to Portsmouth, Hampshire.

== 16 January ==
List of shipwrecks: 16 January 1833
Ship	State	Description
Britannia	United Kingdom	The whaler was wrecked in the Comoros Islands. She was subsequently repaired and arrived at Mauritius on 28 June.

== 17 January ==
List of shipwrecks: 17 January 1833
Ship	State	Description
Rose	United Kingdom	The ship was wrecked at Ballyshannon, County Antrim.
Susannah	United Kingdom	The ship was in collision with Providentia (United Kingdom) off the Isles of Scilly and sank with the loss of all but three of her crew. She was on a voyage from Yarmouth, Isle of Wight to Bristol, Gloucestershire.

== 18 January ==
List of shipwrecks: 18 January 1833
Ship	State	Description
Friends	United Kingdom	The ship was driven ashore and wrecked at South Shields, County Durham. Her crew were rescued. She was on a voyage from Montrose, Forfarshire to London.
Keith Steward	United Kingdom	The ship was driven ashore and wrecked at South Shields. Her crew were rescued. She was on a voyage from Perth to London.
St. Ninian	United Kingdom	The ship was driven ashore and wrecked at South Shields. Her crew were rescued. She was on a voyage from Newry, County Antrim to London.
Thomas	United Kingdom	The ship was driven ashore and damaged at South Shields. Her crew were rescued. She was on a voyage from Sunderland, County Durham to London. She was refloated on 25 January and taken in to South Shields for repairs.

== 21 January ==
List of shipwrecks: 21 January 1833
Ship	State	Description
Fame	United Kingdom	The ship was driven ashore at "Ennishaven Head". she was on a voyage from Ayr to Londonderry.
Rosewall	United Kingdom	The ship was driven ashore at Bastia, Corsica, France. Her crew were rescued. She was on a voyage from St Ives, Cornwall to Livorno, Kingdom of Sardinia and Naples, Kingdom of the Two Sicilies.

== 22 January ==
List of shipwrecks: 22 January 1833
Ship	State	Description
Isabel	United Kingdom	The ship was driven ashore on Barbados.

== 24 January ==
List of shipwrecks: 24 January 1833
Ship	State	Description
Doctor	United Kingdom	The ship was wrecked on a reef off Sun Island. Her crew were rescued. She was on a voyage from Belize to Jamaica.
Leonidas	France	The ship was wrecked off Audierne, Finistère. Her crew were rescued. She was on a voyage from Bordeaux, Gironde to London, United Kingdom.
Walter Matthews	United Kingdom	The ship sank in Mount's Bay. Her crew were rescued. She was on a voyage from Cork to London.

== 25 January ==
List of shipwrecks: 25 January 1833
Ship	State	Description
Facility	United Kingdom	The galiot was driven ashore at Crail, Perthshire. She was on a voyage from Dundee, Forfarshire to Morrison's Haven, Lothian.

== 26 January ==
List of shipwrecks: 26 January 1833
Ship	State	Description
Guysbro	United Kingdom	The ship departed from Brigus, Newfoundland, British North America for Torquay, Devon. No further trace, presumed foundered with the loss of all hands.
Mary	United Kingdom	The ship was run down and sunk. Her crew were rescued. She was on a voyage from Dublin to Whitehaven, Cumberland.

== 27 January ==
List of shipwrecks: 27 January 1833
Ship	State	Description
Fame	United Kingdom	The ship was wrecked in Lough Foyle with the loss of one of her seven crew.

== 28 January ==
List of shipwrecks: 28 January 1833
Ship	State	Description
Guillaume	Belgium	The ship was driven ashore and wrecked near Ostend, West Flanders. She was on a voyage from "Vilaanova" to Ostend.
Highland Lad	United Kingdom	The ship was driven ashore and wrecked near Mazara del Vallo, Sicily. She was on a voyage from Palermo, Sicily to Falmouth, Cornwall.

== 29 January ==
List of shipwrecks: 29 January 1833
Ship	State	Description
Amity	United Kingdom	The ship was driven onto rocks at Gun Point, Padstow, Cornwall.
Calypso	United Kingdom	The ship was departed from Halifax, Nova Scotia, British North America for an English port. No further trace, presumed foundered with the loss of all on board.
Mary McDonald	United Kingdom	The brig was driven ashore on Santa Rosa Island, Florida, United States. Her crew survived. She was on a voyage from Puerto Cabello, Venezuela to Mobile, Alabama, United States.
Miguelite	Spain	The ship was driven ashore at Margate, Kent, United Kingdom.

== 31 January ==
List of shipwrecks: 31 January 1833
Ship	State	Description
Cossack	United Kingdom	The ship was driven ashore at Bridlington, Yorkshire. Her crew were rescued. She was on a voyage from London to South Shields, County Durham.
Easle	United Kingdom	The ship was driven ashore at Sandy Hook, New Jersey, United States. She was on a voyage from Liverpool, Lancashire to New York, United States.

== Unknown date ==
List of shipwrecks: Unknown date 1833
Ship	State	Description
Britannia	United Kingdom	The whaler was lost in the "Gosman Islands".
Brothers	United Kingdom	The ship was wrecked at Aracati, Brazil.
Dove	United Kingdom	The ship was wrecked on São Miguel, Azores, Portugal.
Earl Gower	United Kingdom	The ship sank at Wick, Caithness on or before 11 January. She was on a voyage from Leith, Lothian to Wick.
Emily	(United Kingdom of Great Britain and Ireland) British North America	The ship was wrecked on "Langlois Island". Her crew were rescued. She was on a voyage from Sydney, Nova Scotia to St. John's, Newfoundland.
James Laughton	United Kingdom	The ship was driven onto "Barnsby Island" by ice. She was on a voyage from Quebec City, Lower Canada, British North America to Liverpool, Lancashire.
James Sibbald	British East India Company	The ship was wrecked off Coringa, Andhra Pradesh, India before 15 January whilst bound for the United Kingdom. There was at least one survivor.
Jeune Adèle	France	The ship was wrecked on the French coast. She was on a voyage from the Charente to London, United Kingdom.
Logan	United States	The ship was struck by lightning and set afire in the Atlantic Ocean. She was abandoned by her crew, who were rescued after five days by Grand Turk (United States). Logan was on a voyage from Savannah, Georgia to Liverpool, Lancashire, United Kingdom.
Lord Ravensworth	United Kingdom	The ship was wrecked on the Norwegian coast with the loss of four of her crew. She was on a voyage from Arkhangelsk, Russia to Newcastle upon Tyne, Northumberland.
Lord St. Helens	United Kingdom	The ship was wrecked at Miramichi, New Brunswick, British North America.
Margaret	United Kingdom	The ship departed from Tenerife, Canary Islands, Spain in early January for Aberdeen. No further trace, presumed foundered with the loss of all hands.
Nancy	United Kingdom	The ship struck a sunken rock and foundered off the coast of County Donegal. She was on a voyage from Wick, Caithness to Limerick.
Theresa Julia	United Kingdom	The three-masted schooner was wrecked on the Wolf Rock in early January.
Woodrop	United Kingdom	The whaler was wrecked near "Cape Negre" on the Barbary Coast.
