= John Fian =

Scottish teacher; executed as warlock

Doctor Fian
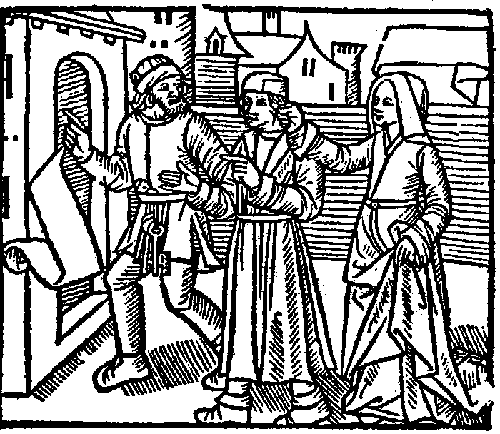
- Dr. Fian (center) showing penitence for his wicked life to his jailer and chaplain the morning before his escape from prison. From Daemonologie; Newes from Scotland (1597).
- Died: 27 January 1591; Edinburgh, Scotland
- Other name: John Cunningham
- Status: Burned at the stake
- Convictions: Sorcery, bewitchment (1590)
- Penalty: Death

John Fian (alias Cunninghame) (died 27 January 1591) was a Scottish schoolmaster and purported sorcerer. He confessed to have a compact with the devil while acting as register and scholar to several witches in North Berwick Kirk. He was accused of bewitching townsfolk, preaching witchcraft, and, along with Agnes Sampson and others, raising storms to sink the fleet of King James VI of Scotland and his wife Anne of Denmark as they returned from Copenhagen, having been married in Oslo. He along with several other purported witches were arrested, examined and put to torture, in what would become known as the North Berwick witch trials.

== Apprehension ==
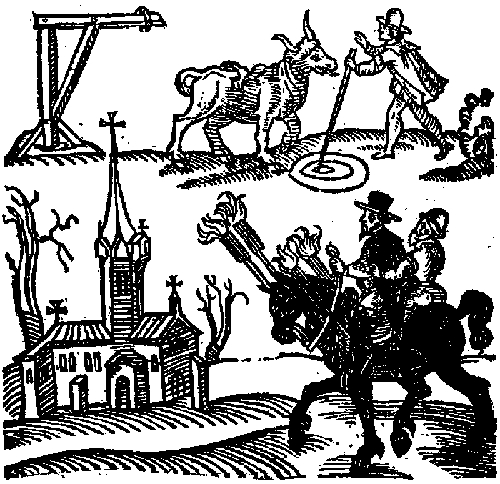
Illustration of Doctor Fian drawing conjuration circles with the bewitched cow, from the English pamphlet Newes from Scotland

His apprehension was caused by a confession from Geillis Duncan which afterward prompted his examinations as a sorcerer. Fian first openly confessed that he bewitched a gentleman to fall into fits of lunacy once every 24 hours. To verify this, Fian caused the same gentleman to come before the presence of King James in the king's chamber on 24 December 1590, where he purportedly bewitched the man, causing him to be in a hysterical fit for an entire hour of screaming, contorting and jumping high enough to touch the ceiling of the chamber; after the hour ended, the gentleman declared no memory of the event, as if he were asleep. Fian confessed during a later trial examination that he made a compact with Satan but would renounce Satan and vow to lead the life of a Christian. The next morning, he confessed that during the previous night, the Devil came to him in his cell dressed in all black with a white wand, demanding Fian to continue his faithful service, according to the first oath and promise of their agreement. Fian testified that he renounced Satan to his face saying "Avoided Satan, avoided, for I have listened too much to thee, and by the same thou hast undone me, in respect whereof I utterly forsake you." He confessed that the devil then answered "That once ere thou die thou shall be mine." The devil afterwards broke the white wand, and immediately vanished from his sight. He then was given a chance to lead the life he promised but the same night he stole a key to his cell and escaped. He was eventually captured and tortured until his execution.

== Death ==
He endured the torture of having his fingernails forcibly extracted, then having iron pins thrust therein, the pilliwinks, and the boot to crush his feet until they were so small that they were no longer usable. He was reported to have endured the torture without expressing pain. He was finally taken to the Castlehill in Edinburgh, placed in a cart, strangled, and burnt on 27 January 1591. The cost of his execution was £5 18s 2d.

The English ambassador Robert Bowes recorded that during his execution Fian denied his confession, saying he told those tales by fear of torture and to save his life.

== See also ==
- Newes from Scotland
- Daemonologie
- North Berwick witch trials
- John Spreul
