= Jean Lyon, Countess of Angus =

Scottish courtier and landowner

Jean Lyon, Countess of Angus (died c. 1610) was a Scottish courtier and landowner, who became involved in a witchcraft trial.

She was a daughter of John Lyon, 8th Lord Glamis and Elizabeth Abernethy, only daughter of William Abernethy, 5th Lord Saltoun.

== Marriages ==
She married firstly Robert Douglas younger of Lochleven, Master of Morton. Their children included William Douglas, 7th Earl of Morton. Robert Douglas was lost at sea in 1585. Secondly she married Archibald Douglas, 8th Earl of Angus, and they had a daughter, Margaret Douglas. Thirdly she married Alexander Lindsay, 1st Lord Spynie.

== Witchcraft ==
The Earl of Angus died at Smeaton on 4 August 1588, and the influence of witchcraft was suspected. On 8 May 1591 Barbara Napier was accused on several witchcraft charges including that of asking Agnes Sampson to aid Jean Lyon during pregnancy by preventing her vomiting with magic. Barbara was also accused of asking Sampson to charm her into Jean Lyon's favour. Napier was acquitted of making a charm with Sampson to cause the death of the Earl of Angus. It is unclear if Barbara Napier was subsequently executed, or released.

The countess had a daughter on 26 December 1588, and so the inheritance of the earldom came into dispute.

== Royal jewel ==
In February 1590 James Lumsden of Airdrie in Crail (d. 1598) and William Napier of Wrichtshouses returned a royal jewel consisting of a diamond in a gold setting worth 2,000 French gold crowns to the Privy Council. Lumsden said he had obtained the jewel from Jean Lyon, Countess of Angus, and pledged it on her behalf to an Edinburgh merchant Jacob Barron for a loan, not knowing it was a royal jewel. Twenty years previously a number of jewels of Mary, Queen of Scots had been marketed or pledged for loans by Regent Moray and William Kirkcaldy of Grange during the Marian Civil War, and this jewel may have left the royal collection at that time.

== Lord Spynie ==
James VI of Scotland influenced Jean Lyon to wed Lord Spynie, writing letters to both parties to urge their marriage. They hosted James VI and Anne of Denmark at Aberdour at the end of December 1590.

They had two sons, Alexander Lindsay, 2nd Lord Spynie, and John who died young, and two daughters, Anne, who married to Sir Robert Graham of Invermay, and Margaret, who married John Erskine of Dun.

The English ambassador Robert Bowes described her in August 1592 as the "late lady and mistress of Arderyre", meaning James Lumsden, Laird of Airdrie, who was a supporter of the rebel Earl of Bothwell, who she owed money. It was thought she had spoken to Bothwell at Aberdour Castle and invited him there. Bowes wrote that Spynie was pursuing Airdrie for money owed to Jean Lyon, apparently to prevent him testifying about Bothwell's alleged visit to Aberdour. The old laird of Airdrie's wife, Marjorie Douglas, had died on 14 February 1591.
