= Daemonologie =

Book by King James VI/I of Scotland/England about demons

Daemonologie, in Forme of a Dialogue, Diuided into Three Bookes
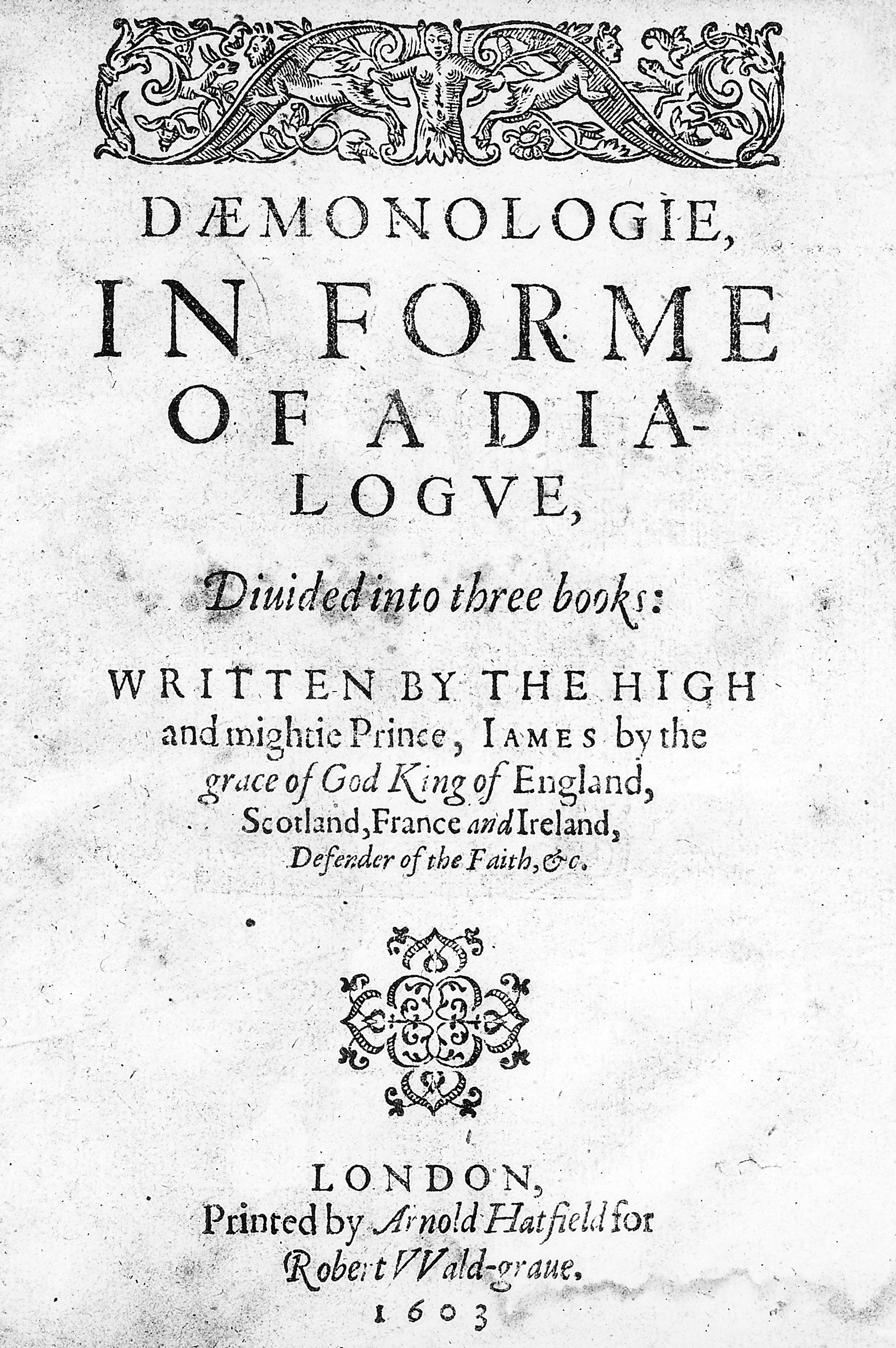
- Title page of a 1603 reprinting
- Author: James R. [i.e., James VI and I]
- Language: English
- Subject: Occult, philosophy, religion
- Genre: Socratic dialogue
- Publisher: Robert Waldegrave
- Publication date: 1597
- Publication place: Edinburgh, Scotland
- Media type: Print (hardcover)
- Pages: 81
- OCLC: 1180799576
- Preceded by: Newes from Scotland (1591)

Daemonologie, in Forme of a Dialogue, Divided into Three Bookes, usually known as simply Daemonologie (/ˌdiː.mən.ˈɒl.ə.dʒi/, DEE-mən-ALL-ə-jee), is a philosophical dissertation by King James on contemporary necromancy and the historical relationships between the various methods of divination used from ancient black magic, first published in 1597. It was reprinted in 1603 when James took the throne of England. The widespread consensus is that King James wrote Dæmonologie in response to sceptical publications such as Reginald Scot's The Discoverie of Witchcraft.

Dæmonologie included a study of demonology and the methods demons used to bother troubled men. The book frames witchcraft as "treason against God" and endorses the practice of witch hunting.

This book is believed to be one of the main sources used by William Shakespeare in the production of Macbeth. Shakespeare attributed many quotes and rituals found within the book directly to the Weird Sisters, yet also attributed the Scottish themes and settings referenced from the trials in which King James was involved.

== Structure ==
King James wrote a dissertation titled Daemonologie that was first sold in 1597, several years prior to the first publication of the King James Authorized Version of the Bible. Within three short books James wrote a philosophical dissertation in the form of a Socratic dialogue for the purpose of making arguments and comparisons between magic, sorcery and witchcraft, but wrote also his classification of demons.

In writing the book, King James was heavily influenced by his personal involvement in the North Berwick witch trials from 1590. Following the execution of an alleged sorcerer in the year 1591, the news of the trials was narrated in a news pamphlet titled Newes from Scotland and was included as the final chapter of the text. The book endorses the practice of witch hunting in a Christian society. King James may also have been prompted to write the Daemonologie by an anonymous critical pamphlet John Upaland which circulated in 1597 and alleged the Scottish court was bewitched.

James begins the book:

The feaefull aboundinge at this time in this countrie, of these detestable slaves of the Devil, the Witches or enchanters, hath moved me (beloved reader) to dispatch in post, this following treatise of mine (...) to resolve the doubting (...) both that such assaults of Satan are most certainly practised, and that the instrument thereof merits most severely to be punished.

As detailed in his preface, the main sources of this work were that of historically confessed witches, judicial case history and the Bible itself. He also amassed various dissertations on magical studies to expand his education on the relationships between infernal spirits and men. James generally sought to prove that the devilish arts have always been yet still are, but also explains the justification of a witch trial and the punishments which a practitioner of the dark arts merits.

He also reasons scholastically what kinds of things are possible in the performance of these arts, and the natural causes of the Devil's power with the use of philosophical reasoning. King James sought to prove the existence of witchcraft to other Christians through biblical teachings. His work is separated into three books based on the different arguments the philosophers discuss, with citations of biblical scripture throughout the text.

=== Character ===
This work reads as a political and theological dissertation in the form of a philosophical dialogue between the characters Philomathes and Epistemon who debate the various topics of magic, sorcery, witchcraft and demonology. The purpose seems to be an educational piece on the study of witchcraft and to inform the public about the histories and etymologies of all subcategories involved in magical practices. The work also serves to make formal accusations against the practice of witchcraft and comparatively elaborates James' views against papistry.

In the preface, King James states that he chose to write the content in the form of a dialogue to better entertain the reader. By doing so, he follows the method of many philosophical writers prior to his time. As the main plot, Philomathes hears news in the kingdom regarding the rumors of witchcraft which seems all miraculous and amazing but could find no one knowledgeable on the matter to have a serious political discussion on the issue. He finds a philosopher named Epistemon who is very knowledgeable on the topics of theology.

=== Book One ===
The argument of the first book is on the following topics regarding the description of magic:

- The division of the various magical arts with a comparison between necromancy and witchcraft
- The use of charms, circles, and conjurations
- The division of astrology
- The Devil's contract with man
- Comparisons between the miracles of God and the devil
- The purpose of these practices is to advise people

=== Book Two ===
The main argument of the second book is based on the following topics regarding the description of sorcery and witchcraft:

- The difference between biblical proof and imagination or myth
- A description of sorcery and its comparison with witchcraft
- The path of a sorcerer's apprenticeship
- Curses and the roles of Satan
- The appearance of devils; the times and forms which they appear
- The division of witch actions
- Methods of transportation and the illusions of Satan

=== Book Three ===
The third book is the conclusion of the whole dialogue. James says that demons are under the direct supervision of God and are unable to act without God's permission, and he shows how God uses demonic forces as a "Rod of Correction" when men stray from His will. Demons may also be commissioned by witches or magicians to conduct acts of ill will against others. He quotes previous authors who state that each devil has the ability to appear in diverse shapes or forms for varying purposes. Ultimately the works of demons (despite their attempts to do otherwise) will end in the further glorification of God .

James provides a description of all of the kinds of spirits and specters that trouble men or women. His classification of demons is not based on separate demonic entities with their names, ranks, or titles. Instead, demonic entities are categorized according to the methods that they use to inflict mischief or torment on a living individual or a deceased corpse. The four categories of demonic entities, based on their methods, are:

- Spectra: spirits that trouble houses or solitary places
- Obsession: spirits that trouble people at various times of the day, such as incubi and succubae
- Possession: spirits that enter inwardly into a person to trouble them
- Faries: illusionary spirits that prophesy, consort, and transport their servants

=== Newes from Scotland ===
Newes from Scotland – declaring the damnable life and death of Dr. Fian, a notable sorcerer is a pamphlet originally printed in London in 1591 that details the infamous North Berwick witch trials in Scotland and the confessions given before the King.

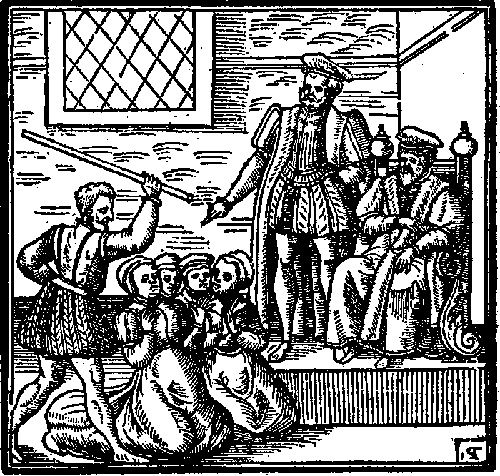
Suspected witches kneeling before King James, Daemonologie (1597)

The initial and subsequent publications of Daemonologie included a previously published news pamphlet detailing the accounts of the North Berwick witch trials that involved King James himself as he acted as judge over the proceedings. The deputy bailiff to the kingdom of Scotland, David Seaton, had a servant named Geillis Duncan who, within a short period of time, was found to have miraculously helped any who were troubled or grieved with sickness or infirmity. (Note: p. 100.)

David Seaton examined her as a witch and obtained a confession that caused the apprehension of several others (Note: p. 101.) later declared to be notorious witches. Agnis Tompson confessed before King James to have attempted his assassination using witchcraft on more than one occasion. The pamphlet details how she attempted these. She also confessed to participating in a sabbat during All Hallows' Eve (Note: p. 103.) where she and others sacrificed a cat and sent it into the sea as they chanted in hopes of summoning a tempest to sink a fleet of ships accompanying James as he was arriving in the port of Leith from a trip to Norway. One ship was sunk from the storm containing gifts meant for the Queen of Scotland but the others including the ship transporting King James were unharmed. (Note: p. 107.)

Doctor Fian was deemed a notable sorcerer and was among many others that were put on trial. The pamphlet details their reasons for conducting sorcery, the methods used, how each of the witches were apprehended and the torture methods used in their punishments and death. The case of Doctor Fian follows his compact with Satan, a conflict he had with another witch who sabotaged an enchantment meant for her daughter, (Note: p. 111.) his examinations during the trial, the torture he endured, his escape and subsequent execution.

== Cultural significance ==
It has been noted that the themes taken from Daemonologie and King James' involvement in the North Berwick witch trials may have directly contributed to Shakespeare's work Macbeth. Evidence of this exists in the three witches' use of ritual magic and direct quotes that directly relate to the testimony given from the witch trials described in the Newes of Scotland pamphlet. Macbeth had come into public enjoyment a few years after the publication of Daemonologie and retains many of the same Scottish themes and settings.

Daemonologie assisted in the creation of witchcraft reform, heavily inspiring Richard Bernard in writing a manual on witch-finding in 1629 titled A Guide to Grand-Jury Men, which advised judicial trial procedure to take a stronger investigative approach to acquiring and analyzing evidence and obtaining witnesses to be present during witch-craft trials. There was also an influence on Matthew Hopkins in his work as a witch-finder between 1644 and 1646 in which an estimated 300 witches were tried and executed. In the year of Hopkins' death, 1647, he published The Discovery of Witches which directly cited Daemonologie as a source for creating methods in discovering a witch.

The philosophical arguments King James poses through the character Epistemon are based on concepts of theological reasoning regarding society's belief as his opponent, Philomathes, takes a philosophical stance on society's legal aspects but sought to obtain the knowledge of Epistemon. This philosophical approach signified as a philomath seeking to obtain greater knowledge through epistemology, a term that was later coined by James Frederick Ferrier in 1854.

== See also ==
- Demonic possession
- Great Scottish Witch Hunt of 1597
- Lemures
- Malleus Maleficarum
- Margaret Aitken (the great witch of Balwearie)
- Spirit possession
- Witchcraft and divination in the Hebrew Bible
- Witch of Endor
