= Newes from Scotland =

1591 Scottish pamphlet

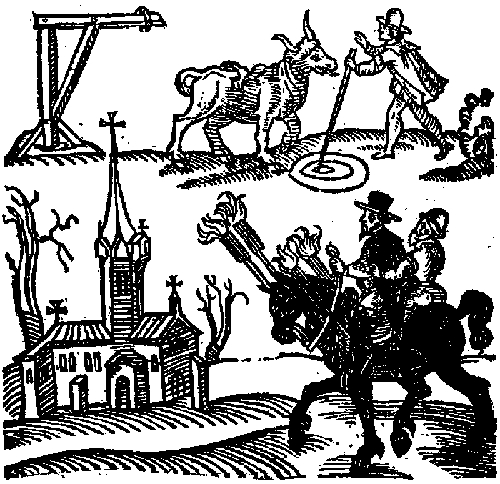
The upper portion of this illustration of Doctor Fian is from a woodcut in Newes from Scotland. (Note: The lower portion of the image, which shows two men astride a black horse, was in Fian's dittay but did not appear in the pamphlet.)

Newes from Scotland – declaring the damnable life and death of Dr. Fian, a notable sorcerer is a pamphlet printed in London in 1591, and likely written by James Carmichael, who later advised King James VI on the writing of his book Daemonologie. Carmichael made a claim for payment for fifteen months work attending the examinations of diverse witches. The book describes the North Berwick witch trials in Scotland and the confessions given before the king, and was published in Daemonologie by King James in 1597.

== Content ==
Included in the pamphlet is an account of the alleged witches Agnes Sampson, known as the Wise Wife of Keith, and the principal accuser Geillis Duncan. It also described the death of Archibald Douglas, 8th Earl of Angus who was said to have been bewitched to death in a disease so strange his physician could find no cure or remedy. The pamphlet details the initial events leading up to the trials, how each of the suspected witches were found out and captured. This led to the eventual apprehension of Dr. John Fian who was declared a notable sorcerer, under compact with the devil and the supposed head of the coven.

During his examination, he confessed to be the register of the witches under the service of Satan. Afterwards, he renounced his compact with Satan and swore to live an honourable Christian life. He also testified that Satan came to him the same day to convince him to uphold his original pact. Fian stated that he renounced Satan to his face.

It was the next day when he confessed what happened that he managed to steal a key to his cell from one of the guards and escaped his imprisonment. After he was recaptured, he was tortured to obtain his confession but denied all his previous confessions. Implements described as used during his interrogation included the boot, which crushed his feet and lower legs, with turcas, a type of pincer, and needles to forcibly extract his nails. Geillis Duncan's earlier testimony had been secured by the use of pilliwinks.

== Historical significance ==
The pamphlet contains virtually the only contemporary illustrations of Scottish witchcraft and was the earliest Scottish or English printed document dedicated to only covering witchcraft in Scotland. It provided the first descriptions of the osculum infame, also known as the kiss of shame or the obscene kiss, to the English population.

Original copies are kept at Glasgow University, and in the Bodleian Library at Oxford.

== In popular culture ==
The pamphlet features in the short story "Leave Fast the Knot of Four" by Peter Wise in Disturbing the Water (2024), his collection of themed original ghost stories set around rivers and lakes.
