= North Berwick witch trials =

Scottish witch trials in 1590

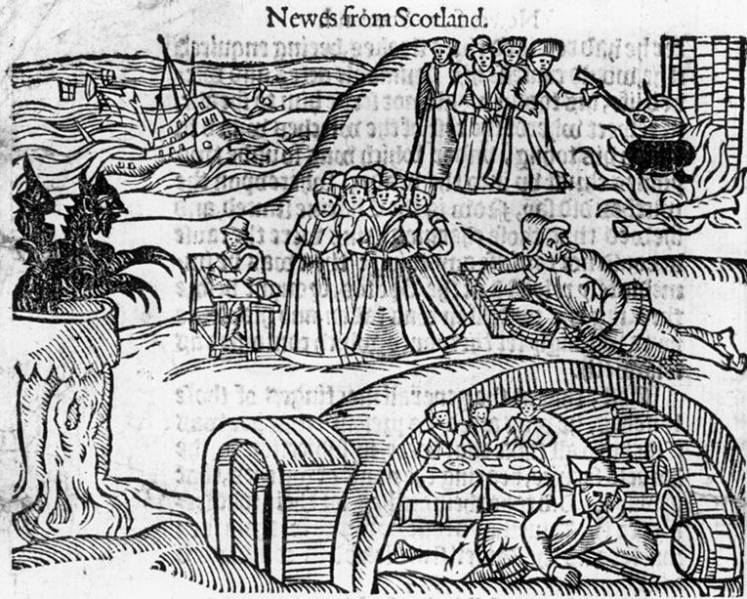
- The North Berwick Witches meet the Devil in the local kirkyard, from a contemporary pamphlet, Newes from Scotland.
- Timespan: 1590-92 (2 years)
- Location: North Berwick, Scotland
- Number of trials: Debated
- Guilty verdicts: 70<
- Executions: 70<
- Notable sources: Daemonologie by King James VI, Newes from Scotland, Kirk and secular court records
- Notable personalities: James VI, David Seaton, Nils Hemmingson
- Notable victims: Geillis Duncan, Agnes Sampson, Dr. John Fian, Francis Stewart, 5th Earl of Bothwell
- Occurred within the context of: Scottish Reformation, Scottish Folk Beliefs, Poverty, De-centralised system of government
- Reasons for beginning: Geillis Duncan’s confession, Scottish Reformation, Failed Crops
- Reasons for ending: Trials moved on to different parts of Scotland

The North Berwick witch trials were the trials in 1590 of a number of people from East Lothian and Scotland, accused of witchcraft in the St Andrew's Auld Kirk in North Berwick on Halloween night. They ran for two years, and implicated over 70 people. These included Francis Stewart, 5th Earl of Bothwell, on charges of high treason.

The "witches" allegedly held their covens on the Auld Kirk Green, part of the modern-day North Berwick Harbour area. Confessions were extracted by torture in the Old Tolbooth, Edinburgh. One source for these events is a 1591 pamphlet Newes from Scotland. King James VI wrote a dissertation on witchcraft and necromancy titled Daemonologie in 1597.

The North Berwick trials were among the better known of the large number of witch trials in early modern Scotland between the early sixteenth century and the mid-eighteenth century.

== The Danish connection ==
This was the first major witchcraft persecution in Scotland, and began with a sensational case involving the royal houses of Denmark-Norway and Scotland. King James VI sailed to Copenhagen to marry Anne of Denmark, sister of Christian IV of Denmark. During their return to Scotland they experienced terrible storms and had to shelter in Norway for several weeks before continuing. At this point, the interest in witch trials were revived in Denmark because of ongoing Trier witch trials in Germany, which were described and discussed in Denmark.

The admiral of the Danish fleet, Peder Munk argued with the treasurer Christoffer Valkendorff about the state of the ships used to transport Anne of Denmark. The storms were blamed on the wife of an official in Copenhagen whom he had insulted. The Copenhagen witch trials were held in July 1590. One of the first Danish victims was Anna Koldings, who, when tortured, divulged the names of five other women; one of whom was Malin, the wife of the burgomaster of Helsingor. They all confessed that they had been guilty of sorcery in raising storms that menaced Queen Anne's voyage, and that on Halloween night they had sent devils to climb up the keel of her ship. In September, two women were burnt as witches at Kronborg. James heard news from Denmark regarding this and decided to set up his own tribunal, imagining an international conspiracy of witches.

== Accused ==
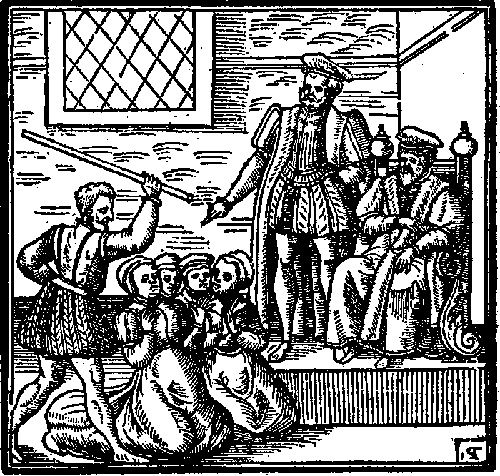
Suspected witches kneeling before King James; Daemonologie (1597)

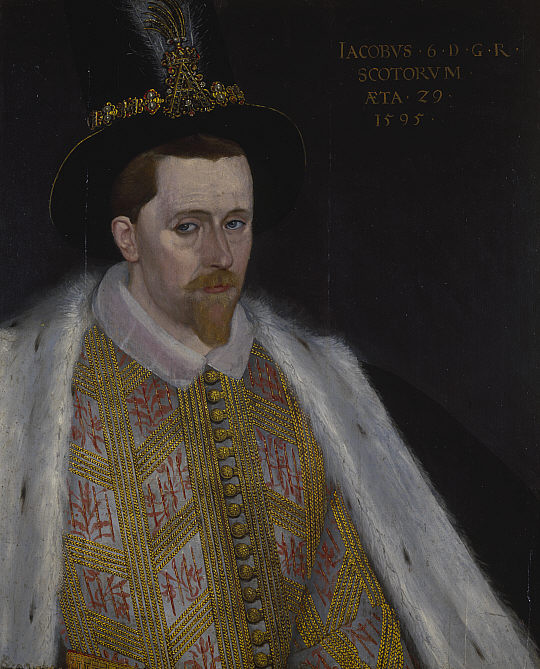
James VI in the 1590s

The main alleged witches directly involved in the trials were:

- Agnes Sampson
- Barbara Napier, sister-in-law of Archibald Douglas of Carshogle.
- Doctor Fian (John Cunningham)
- Euphame MacCalzean
- Geillis Duncan
- Robert Grierson
- Lennit Bandilandis
- The Porter's wife of Seaton
- The Smith of bridge Hallis
- The Wife of George Mott - Margaret Acheson
- Alanis Muir
- Others not named

More than 100 suspected witches in North Berwick were arrested. Several confessed under torture to having met with the Devil in the church at night, and devoted themselves to doing evil, including poisoning the King and other members of his household, and attempting to sink the King's ship. In February 1591 James VI instructed David Seton or Seaton of Tranent to find accused people who had fled to England. The English ambassador Robert Bowes wrote that these fugitives were "the worst sort of witches". David Seton's servant Geillis Duncan had been one of the first accused.

Two significant accused persons were Agnes Sampson, a respected and elderly woman from Humbie, and Dr John Fian, a schoolmaster and scholar in Prestonpans. Both initially refused to confess and were put to severe torture. Sampson was brought before King James and a council of nobles. She denied all the charges, but after torture, she confessed. By special commandment, her head and body hair was shaved and she was fastened to the wall of her cell by a scold's bridle, an iron instrument with 4 sharp prongs forced into the mouth, so that two prongs pressed against the tongue, and the two others against the cheeks. She was kept without sleep and thrown with a rope around her head. After these ordeals she confessed to the 53 indictments against her. She was finally strangled and burned as a witch. According to Newes from Scotland, (1591), Sampson confessed to attending a Sabbat with 200 witches, including Giellis Duncan.

Dr. Fian also suffered severe torture. His fingernails were forcibly extracted, then iron pins were inserted. He was tortured with the pilliwinks, and the boot. Fian was finally taken to the Castlehill in Edinburgh and burned at the stake on 16 December. Fian's testimony implicated Francis Stewart, 5th Earl of Bothwell in a supernatural conspiracy, bringing a political element into the ongoing trials. According to Christopher Smout, between 3,000 and 4,000 accused witches may have been killed in Scotland in the years 1560–1707.

=== Geillis Duncan ===
Scottish witches were linked to storms by the testimony of Gillis Duncan (or Geillis Duncan). She was a servant of David Seaton in Tranent, who forced her to make a confession. Apparently Duncan suddenly began to exhibit a miraculous healing ability and would sneak out of the house during the night. When Seaton confronted her, she could not explain her new ability and strange behaviour and he had her tortured. Whilst she was able to withstand many forms of torture including pilliwinks, she eventually confessed to witchcraft when the method of searching was used (searching is where a suspected witch would be 'searched' for a blemish such as a mole or birth mark, this would then be proclaimed to be a witch's mark) and accused many others of witchcraft. According to the contemporary pamphlet Newes from Scotland, 1591, she named numerous individuals, both women and men:

Agnes Sampson the eldest witch of them all, dwelling in Haddington; Agnes Tompson of Edenbrough; Doctor Fian alias John Cuningham, master of the school at Saltpans in Lowthian, of whose life and strange acts you shal hear more largely in the end of this discourse. These were by the said Geillis Duncane accused, as also George Motts wife, dwelling in Lowthian; Robert Grierson, skipper; and Jannet Blandilands; with the potter's wife of Seaton: the smith at the Brigge Hallis, with innumerable others in those parts, and dwelling in those bounds aforesaid; of whom some are already executed, the rest remained in prison to receive the doome of judgment at the Kinges Majesties will and pleasure.

Duncan was also found to have conspired with Euphame MacCalzean in the murder of Duncan's godfather.

=== Barbara Napier ===
Barbara Napier came from a good family and had married a book dealer named George Ker in 1572. George died at La Rochelle in 1576, and she then married Archibald Douglas whose brother Robert Douglas was the laird of Corshogill. Her family included a daughter, Janet Douglas.

Gillis Duncan caused the arrest of Barbara Naper for bewitching to death Archibald Douglas, 8th Earl of Angus. Archibald was reported to have died from a disease so strange there could be no cure or remedy. He fell ill at Langhope and died at Smeaton near Dalkeith on 4 August 1588.

It was alleged that Euphame MacCalzean, Barbara Napier, Agnes Sampson and others had attended an assembly of witches at "Atkynson's Haven" where an image of James VI was given to the devil for the destruction of the king.

Napier had bought charms to help her own health and to try and fix her poor relationship with Jean Lyon, Countess of Angus who employed her and her husband. They did not work as she lost her job. When it all came to trial, Napier was accused of a practice to kill the king by witchcraft but was found guilty of only the lesser crime of conspiring with witches. James VI ordered the Chancellor to have physicians examine her to see if she was pregnant, and if she was not, to have her burnt and publicly disembowelled.

James VI wanted an appeal to overturn the first verdict, in order to better prosecute the Earl of Bothwell, and an "assize of error" was planned. James VI spoke with the jurors, who faced penalties for their former decision, on 7 June 1591, and they agreed with his views. Her fate is unclear, and it is possible that she was eventually burnt to death. The town council bought materials to build a fire for her execution and these were used on 25 June 1591 at the burning of Euphame MacCalzean. The opinion of the 17th-century historian of the Douglas family, David Hume of Godscroft, was that she had been released.

== Apology from Scottish government ==
In March 2022 Nicola Sturgeon, the First Minister of Scotland, apologised for the persecution of alleged witches during the sixteenth, seventeenth, and eighteenth centuries. The Scottish Government had not apologised previously.

== Popular culture ==
Shakespeare adapted or was influenced by several concepts from the trials, including the rituals confessed by the witches and the Scottish setting, in his tragedy Macbeth. Heavily influenced by the incidents made public, the play was published a few years after King James's Daemonologie. Borrowing many quotes from the treatise, the three witches cast their spells in the same manner: "purposely to be cassin into the sea to raise winds for destruction of ships."

The trials and the events leading up to them are fictionalised in the 1971 young adult historical novel The Thirteenth Member by Mollie Hunter.

Heavy/doom metal group Cathedral has a song called "North Berwick Witch Trials" on their 2005 album The Garden of Unearthly Delights.

Diana Gabaldon's Outlander series of novels features a recurring character named Geillis Duncan who is tried and convicted of being a witch. In the television adaptation she is portrayed by Lotte Verbeek.

Shadow of Night (All Souls series book #2) by Deborah Harkness, although not taking place in Scotland, mentions the North Berwick Witch Trials and the trials are used to shape some of the plot points and events that occur in the book. Additionally, the two main characters, Diana and Matthew travel to the past, to Elizabethan England on Halloween night 1590 at the beginning of the book.

The Burnings, a 2023 debut novel by Naomi Kelsey, describes the North Berwick witch trials from the perspectives of Geillis Duncan and of Margaret Vinstarr, who was married to John Wemyss of Logie and was a lady-in-waiting for princess Anne of Denmark, Queen of Scotland by marriage (at age 14) to King James VI.

== See also ==
- Scots law
- Scottish folklore
