= Geillis Duncan =

16th-century Scottish maid

- Born: Tranent, Scotland
- Died: 4 December 1591; Castlehill, Edinburgh.
- Occupation: maid
- Years active: 1590s
- Known for: Accused witch during the North Berwick Witch Trials

Geillis Duncan also spelled Gillis Duncan (b. unknown d. 4 December 1591) was a young maidservant in 16th century Scotland who was accused of being a witch. She was also the first recorded named player of the mouth harp in what is now Great Britain.

The anonymous pamphlet, Newes from Scotland, published in late 1591 details how she was made to confess to witchcraft and records how the North Berwick witch trials originated, in which as many as seventy people were implicated.

== Background ==
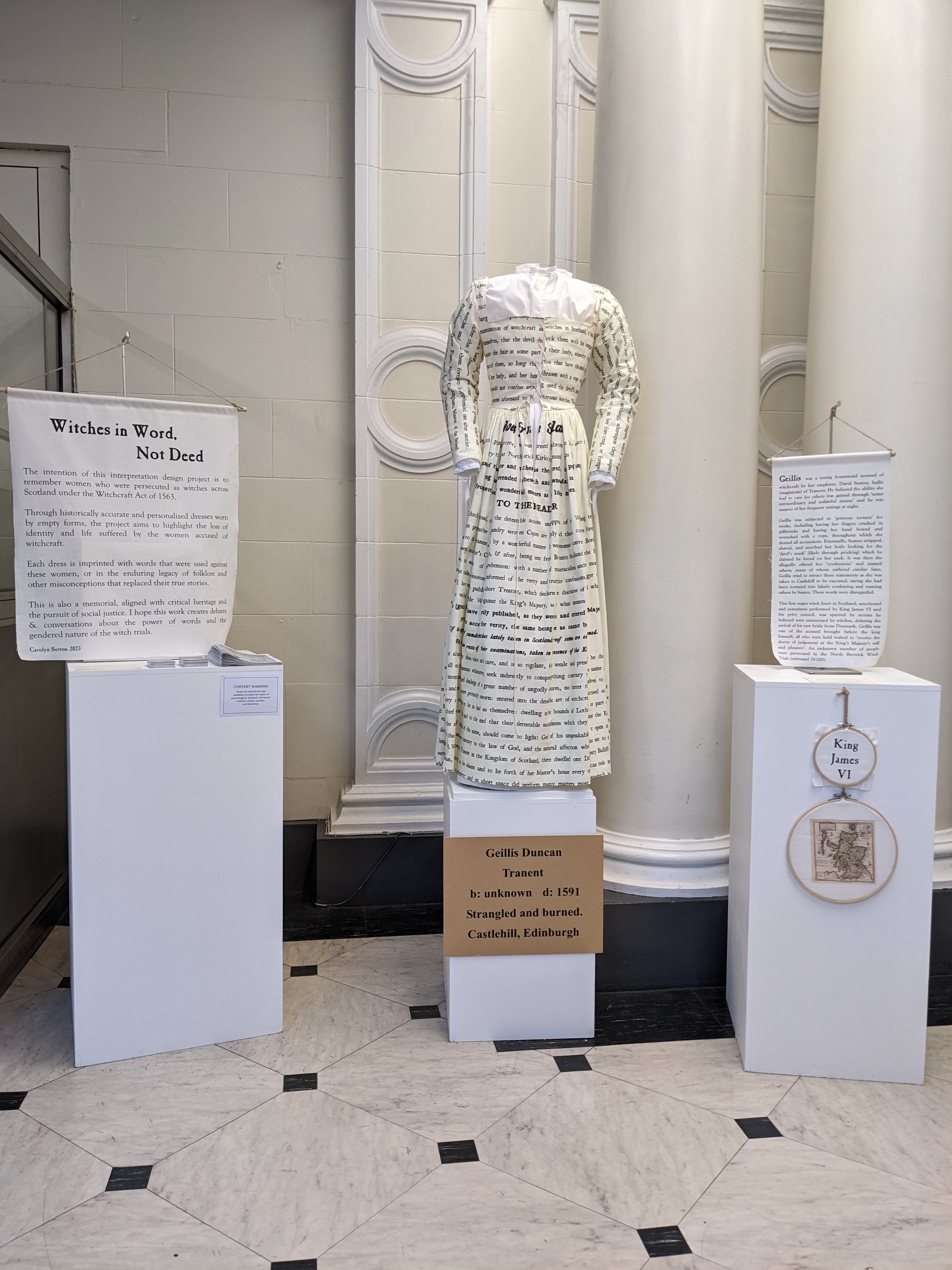
Gillies Duncan display in exhibition Witches in Word, Not Deed by Carolyn Sutton

In 1589, Geillis Duncan was a young maidservant in Tranent in East Lothian, who worked for David Seton. David Seton was the bailie of Tranent, an employee of Isobel Hamilton, Lady Seton, the widow of George Seton, 7th Lord Seton. Lady Seton became known as a great friend of Anne of Denmark.

Seton grew suspicious that Geillis Duncan would leave "her master's house every other night" and wondered where she went on these late-night excursions. As a result of his growing suspicions, Duncan was then accused by Seton of witchcraft after he noticed just how adept she was at curing the ill.

This Geillis Duncan took in hand to help all such as were troubled or grieved with any kind of sickness or infirmity, and in short space did perform many matters most miraculous... made her master and others to be in great admiration, and wondered there at.

— Newes from Scotland, 1591.

== Arrest and torture ==
This wrongful accusation resulted in Duncan's arrest in 1589. Seton took it upon himself to investigate and, with the help of others, illegally tortured her. This involved the use of pilliwinks (thumbscrews) on her fingers to gradually crush them and binding a rope and around her head and gradually crushing it by wrenching. Despite this torment, Duncan would not confess to anything.

Seton then set about to look for the devil's mark on her. Duncan was stripped naked, shaved and subjected to an invasive full-body examination. Eventually, he found the "enemy's mark" in the fore part of her throat. Having endured sleep deprivation, isolation and a cruel and sustained torture, Duncan confessed to the charges against her. She was forced to name other "witches" before being moved to spend a year in the Old Tolbooth prison.

Seton was watchful for potential witches meeting in East Lothian who might attack him. Through Duncan's confession, he came to believe that there may be a plot to cause a storm to stop Anne of Denmark's voyage to Scotland to marry King James VI. Duncan told Seton there had been a witches meeting held at the Auld Kirk of North Berwick on Halloween attended by over 200, including the Devil himself. As modern historians Lawrence Normand and Gareth Roberts explain,

The accused women, like most Scots of the time, would have been well aware of James's marriage and the politics of the court. Indeed, if we are to believe the pre-trial examinations, Geillis Duncan deponed in January 1591 that Agnes Sampson had said 'Now the king is going to f[etch?] his wife but I shall be there before them'. Whatever this cryptic statement meant, it shows the king's doings were the subject of common talk.

Agnes Sampson, another of the accused witches, in one of her confessions, described Geillis Duncan as leading a dance Cummer, go ye before to the tune Gyllatripes, at the Auld Kirk of North Berwick, playing a "small trump" or Jew's Harp. James VI is said to have interviewed her in person and listened to her playing the mouth harp and singing.

== Death ==
Duncan tried to retract her confession and implications of others, numbering as many as sixty or seventy all over Scotland, stating the confession had been obtained under the duress of Seton's extreme torture. The King took a personal interest in the North Berwick Witch Trials, initiating a dark chapter of Scottish history; five large-scale witch hunts took place between 1590 and 1662 . Duncan was executed 4 December 1591 at Castlehill, Edinburgh.

== Art work and popular culture ==
In the television series Outlander, the main character of Claire Fraser encounters "a flame-haired herbalist" called Geillis Duncan (played by Lotte Verbeek) who is wrongfully accused of witchcraft.

Duncan is also the heroine of Scottish novelist and poet Jenni Fagan's book, Hex.

In 2023 there was an exhibition of thirteen figures, Witches in Words, not Deeds, created by Carolyn Sutton, MLIS, AA. Duncan was one of the figures exhibited at Edinburgh's Central Library from September to November 2023. The artist had made her dress with detachable sleeves as she was a maidservant and as with the others in the exhibition, it was white linen imprinted with the words that condemned her.

== See also ==
- Agnes Sampson
- Anne of Denmark and contrary winds
- Barbara Napier
- Euphame MacCalzean
- John Fian
- North Berwick witch trials
- Survey of Scottish Witchcraft
