= Smeaton House =

Coordinates: 55.9159°N 3.0451°W

- Interactive map of the Smeaton House area

General information
- Location: Scotland

Smeaton House, which was originally known as Smeaton Castle - in 18th century as East Park House - and most recently as Dalkeith Home Farm, appears originally to have been a courtyard castle, dating from the 15th century. It was rebuilt in the 16th century by Robert Richardson, and in the 18th century as a Classical house, attributed to James Smith (architect for the Buccleuch family). This was a 3-storey U-plan opening to the east. Less than half of that house remains.

The structure is now a property of the Buccleuch Estates, and is a dwelling house, adjacent to the farm buildings and cottages of the Home Farm of Dalkeith Palace Estate, lying well within the estate perimeter wall.

It is 2 miles (3.2 km) northeast of Dalkeith, Midlothian, Scotland and 1 mile (1.6 km) south of Inveresk, East Lothian.

== Early history ==
In 1450 the lands on which Smeaton Castle was built were the property of the Abbey of Dunfermline. Thereafter the house and lands passed to the Richardson family.

Robert Richardson (d. 1578) was treasurer of Scotland, and is said to have built a new house at Smeaton in 1577. He raised money for Regent Moray by pawning the personal jewellery of Mary, Queen of Scots. These items included a gold chain belt of pearl knots and a hair garnishing with 57 diamonds which his son James Richardson returned to Holyrood Palace on 18 March 1580.

The inhabitants of Smeaton, Inveresk, and Monktonhall complained about the Richardsons in 1581 to the Privy Council. By long tradition they were tenants of Dunfermline Abbey and they objected to the new "feu" of the lands obtained by the Richardsons from Mary, Queen of Scots. The villagers claimed that the Richardsons had undertaken not to disturb their rights and tenancies, but in fact had exacted higher rents.

Archibald Douglas, 8th Earl of Angus died at Smeaton on 4 August 1588. His illness was attributed to witchcraft and Barbara Napier and Euphame MacCalzean were accused.

In the 1590s James VI of Scotland and Anne of Denmark frequently stayed nearby at Dalkeith Palace, and Anne sometimes dined at Smeaton, as she did on 8 August 1598.

== Structure ==
The original castle courtyard was probably square with rounded towers; however, only the northwest (NW) and southwest (SW) towers still stand. Smeaton was converted from castle to a large house in the early/mid-18th century, with three building ranges and a formal entrance reached by external staircase to the upper level on the western range. This conversion was conceived and built to be a more habitable house to complement the formality of Dalkeith Palace itself and was named East Park House. A large surviving cedar tree nearby speaks to formal gardens planted at that time.

This house was badly damaged at some point in intervening decades, presumably due to fire, and thereafter in the 19th century the surviving structure was used as an agricultural building, shown on 1852 OS map as Smeaton Dairy.

The southern range of buildings, which is considerably changed, now survives as a dwelling house with kitchen, 2-story hall and staircase, all added during the 20th century. The original vaulted cellar is retained as its ground floor, with a bedroom floor above.

The NW tower's height has since been diminished, repurposing it as a utility space, whereas the SW tower forming the west end of today's dwelling house retains its full height of four storeys, with altered floor heights, served by a square stair-tower with two garderobes. There are traces of a possible moat at its foot. The walls between the two towers were once the footings of the west front of the house. These walls now frame an open inner courtyard.
