= Euphame MacCalzean =

Scottish woman accused of witchcraft (d. 1591)

- Died: 25 June 1591; Edinburgh, Scotland
- Spouse: Patrick Moscrop
- Father: Thomas MacCalzean, Lord Cliftonhall

Euphame MacCalzean (born before 1558, died 25 June 1591) was a victim of the North Berwick witch trials of 1590–1591.

== Early life ==
She was born at Clifton Hall, west of Edinburgh, the only child of Thomas McCalzean (Lord Cliftonhall), an eminent Edinburgh judge, future Provost of Edinburgh, and Senator of the College of Justice from 1570, who recognized Euphame legally as his daughter and heir in 1558.

MacCalzean married Patrick Moscrop or Moscrope, who served as a Justice deputy, but the relative power of their families meant that Patrick took his father-in-law's surname of MacCalzean. This was normal practice where trying to preserve a family name where the sole heir was female. They were married by December 1579 when they made a joint contract with a Canongate burgess.

In 1586 Eufame and Patrick were involved in a dispute with Edinburgh town council. During an outbreak of plague, on Christmas Day 1585, the council had moved the quarantined and infected people from the Borough Muir to her property at "Quhytehous", or Whitehouse, without permission or compensation. The Privy Council found in her favour.

Euphame and Patrick had at least five children.

== North Berwick witch trials of 1590–1592 ==
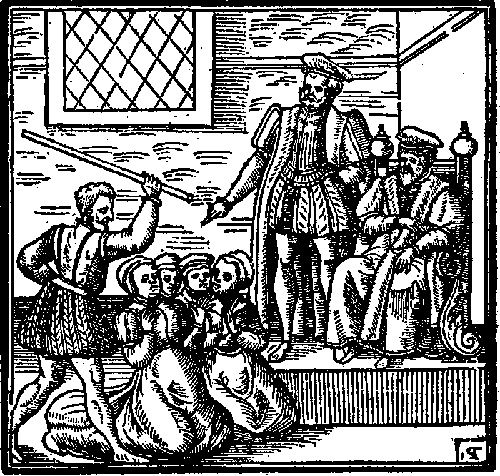
North Berwick witch trials

The cause of the events that led to the North Berwick Witch Trials was the behavior of a maid named Geillis Duncan. Duncan had ostensibly cured illnesses, raising suspicions, in November 1590. Her employer became suspicious that she was deriving her powers from the Devil. Duncan confessed, possibly under duress, to witchcraft and she implicated others including John Cane and Euphame MacCalzean.

MacCalzean, Agnes Sampson and several others were accused of witchcraft. It was alleged that they had killed the Earl of Angus by witchcraft, and planned to murder the first king of England and Scotland, James VI. James was a king by divine right and he was seen as the chief defender against the Devil. James was convinced that magic was involved when Agnes Sampson recounted details of James' first night with his wife Anne of Denmark. The prosecutors cast MacCalzean as a controlling personality who used magic to bewitch her husband. She allegedly tried to cause the deaths of her husband, his father, and his extended family.

The charges included the accusation that she had used her skills to relieve the God-ordained pain of women giving birth. Macalzean was said to have caused the death of her cousin and her nephew. She had argued with her uncle over the ownership of some land at Cliftonhall in Kirkliston and it was alleged that she had killed his son, her nephew, because of this dispute. MacCalzean was said to have attended an assembly of witches at Acheson's Haven where an image of James VI was given to the devil for the destruction of the king.

== Death ==
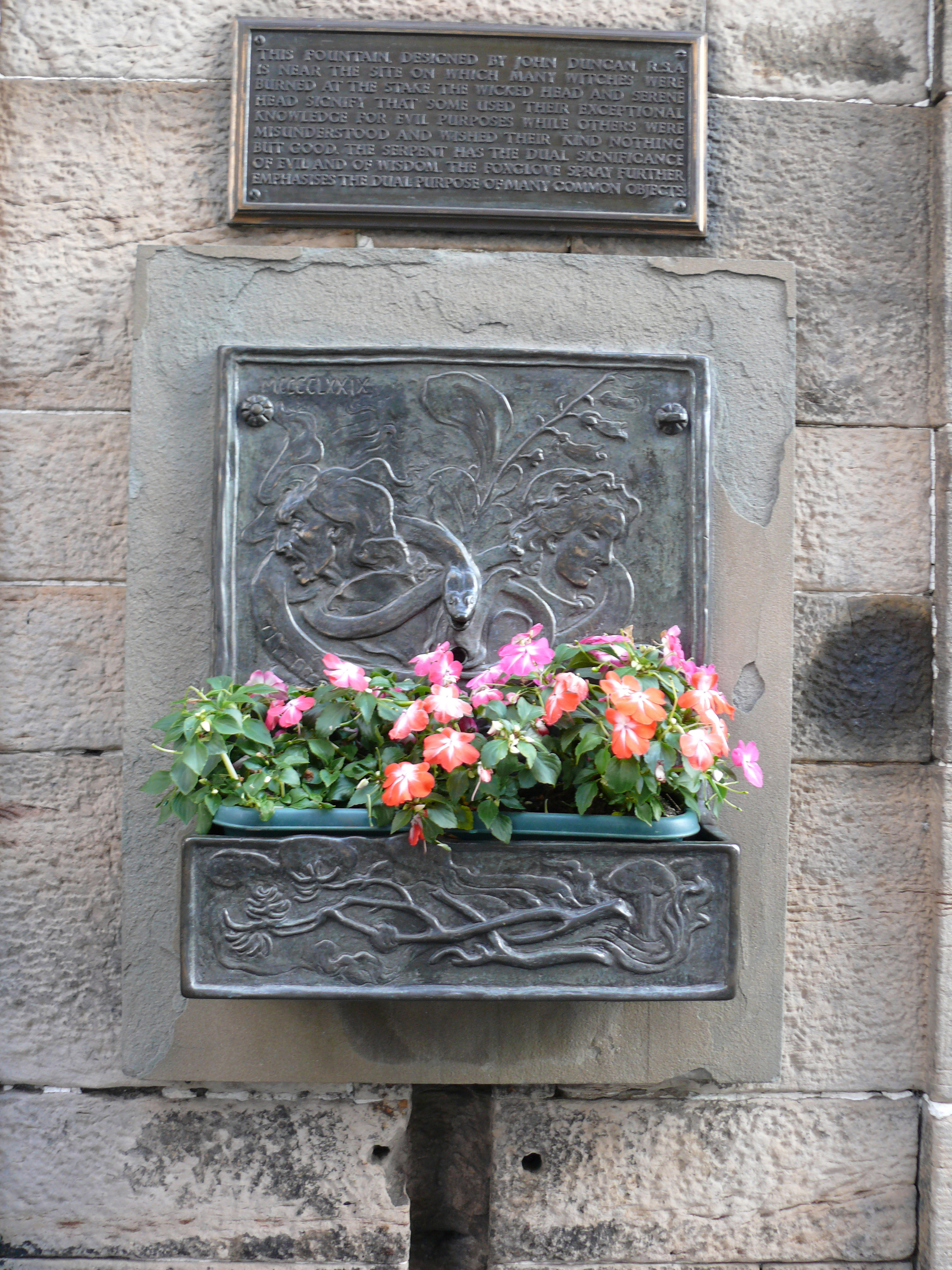
Witches's plaque, Castle Esplanade

MacCalzean was found guilty and burnt alive on 25 June 1591 on the southern slope of the Castle Hill below Edinburgh Castle. The fire was built with materials bought by the town council for the execution of Barbara Napier, which was deferred.

A plaque on the Castle Esplanade remembers the event.

James VI gave her estate of Cliftonhall to his favourite Sir James Sandilands of Slamannan. Her house on Edinburgh's High Street was given to John Shaw, an officer in the royal stables. Shaw was killed in the defence of James VI at the Raid of Holyrood.

== In fiction ==
The episode "Powers of Darkness" of the BBC Scotland 1979 serial The Omega Factor involves an Edinburgh University student possessed by the spirit of "Effie" or Euphame MacCalzean.
