= Burgie Castle =

Tower house in Moray, Scotland

Coordinates: 57.6147°N 3.5188°W

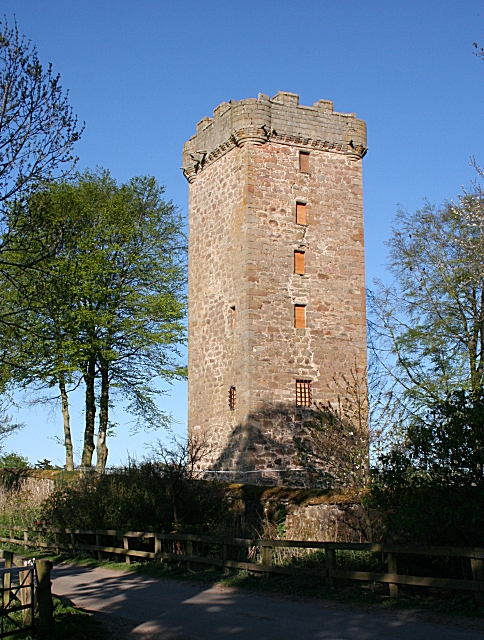
Ruins of Burgie Castle.

Burgie Castle is a 17th-century Z-plan tower house, about 3.5 miles (5.6 km) east of Forres, Moray, Scotland, south-east of Burgie House.

== History ==
The land was transferred from Kinloss Abbey to the Dunbars in 1566, and they constructed the castle. Although in 1645 Dunbar of Burgie was in arms against James Graham, 1st Marquess of Montrose, in 1650 he bankrupted himself in paying for supplies for the army of Charles II. Thomas Dunbar of Grange purchased the property from him. In 1702 the castle was extended, but in 1802 most of it was demolished to furnish material for Burgie House, which was in due course rebuilt as a plain two-storey mansion in 1902.

== Structure ==
Only the north-west tower, of six storeys, remains from the original castle and a little of the main block. The tower is topped by a parapet. A corbelled-out stair tower, with a cap house, stands in the re-entrant angle with the main block. There are iron yett bars in some windows, while the main entrance has its iron yet still. The walls are pierced by shot holes and embrasures. The basement, and the fifth and sixth stories, are vaulted. In the remains of the main block is a fireplace surmounted by the Dunbar arms and the date 1602. Internally there are extensive areas of plasterwork, along with timberwork such as floors, cornices, doors and a shuttered window.

A pleasance wall surrounds the structure. There is a well in what was once the courtyard.

Preservation is being considered by the Burgie Castle Preservation Trust.

== See also ==
- Castles in Great Britain and Ireland
- List of castles in Scotland
