= David Moysie =

16th-century Scottish memoirist

David Moysie (fl. 1590) was a Scottish notary public, known as the author of the Memoirs of the Affairs of Scotland, 1577–1603.

== Life ==
He was by profession a writer and notary public. A notarial attestation of a lease by him occurs in 1577. From 1582 he was engaged as a crown servant, first as a clerk of the privy council, carrying out secretarial work under the superintendence of John Andrew, and attending James VI at court. Afterwards, about 1596, he was in the office of John Lindsay of Balcarres, Lord Menmuir, the king's secretary. On 3 August 1584 he obtained a grant under the privy seal for his son David's schooling; on the death of his son, soon after, he had the gift ratified in his own favour on 19 February 1585. Other references to Moysie occur in letters written to Sir John Lindsay the secretary in 1596.

== Works ==
The Memoirs are the record of an eyewitness, surviving in two manuscripts. They were printed by Ruddiman (Edinburgh, 1755), and edited for the Bannatyne Club (Edinburgh, 1830) by James Dennistoun. Dennistoun used a manuscript belonging to Lord Belhaven and Stenton and provided an appendix of additional variant readings from other versions of the text.

- David Moyses, Memoirs of the affairs of Scotland from K. James VI his taking of the government in 1577, till his accession to the Crown of England in 1603 (Edinburgh, 1755).
- James Dennistoun, Memoirs of the affairs of Scotland, by David Moysie (Bannatyne Club: Edinburgh, 1830).
