= Morrison's Haven =

Harbour at Prestongrange, East Lothian, Scotland

Coordinates: 55.951°N 3.0056°W

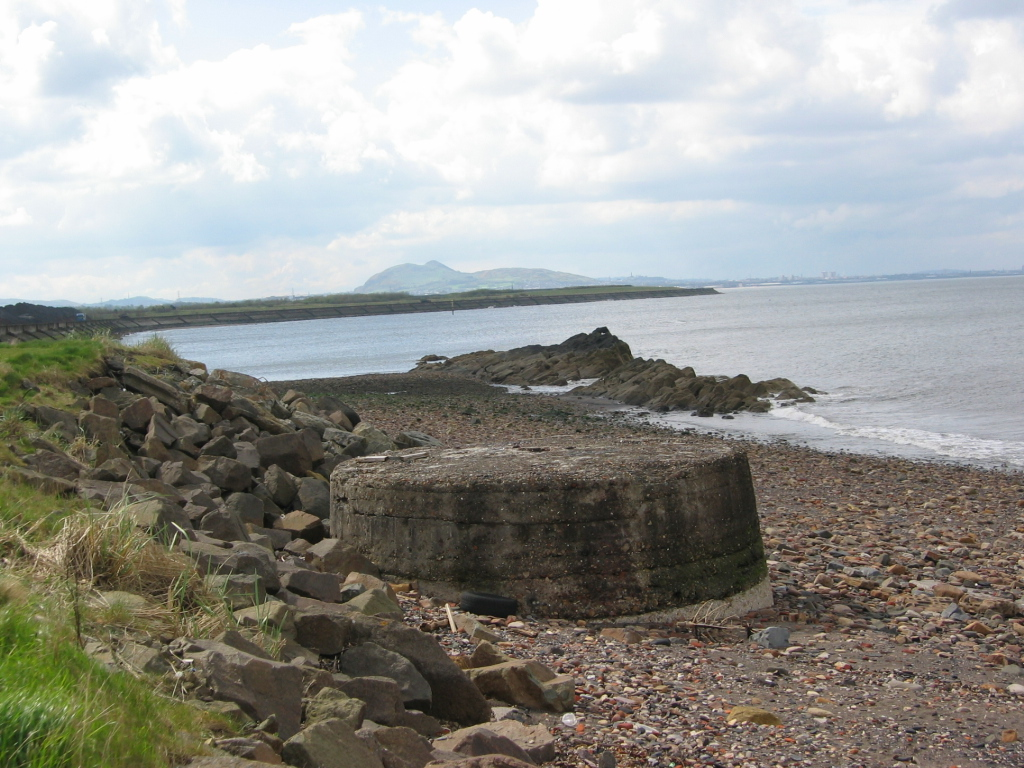

Morrison's Haven is a harbour at Prestongrange, East Lothian, Scotland, UK, on the B1348, close to Levenhall Links, Prestongrange Industrial Heritage Museum, Prestonpans, and Prestongrange House.

The name comes from the Morisons of Prestongrange. A part of Prestongrange were purchased by John Morison from the Kerr family in 1609. He was a burgess of Edinburgh, a bailie (1581) and treasurer of Edinburgh (1588). His son Sir Alexander Morison, a Lord of Session, developed the harbour. The property was purchased in 1746 from William Morrison by William Grant.

== History ==
In 1526, the Cistercian monks of Holyrood Abbey and Newbattle Abbey received permission from King James V for the construction of a port in place called "Gilbertis-draucht". The Abbot leased the port to Alexander Atkinsoun or Achesoun, and the port was known as Acheson's Haven and sometimes "New Haven" until the 17th century. The monks could also collect "port monies, customs and duties". There was at least one mill, and a stone fort with underground vaults which was destroyed by Oliver Cromwell in 1650 on his way to Leith.

Some fortifications were built at the harbour in the time of James V at the "Mill Port" (le port du moulin) according to John Acheson, an archer in the guard of Henri II of France. In 1557, John Acheson of "Mylnhaven or Gilbertis Drawcht" and his wife Jonet Heriot lived nearby and collected customs duties from the haven and the end of Prestonpans.

Mary, Queen of Scots wrote to her mother Mary of Guise in May 1557, about the lands of "Goffenot" or Gosford, and mentioned the use of Alexander Achesoun's lands during the war with England, now known as the Rough Wooing.

The harbour was used to load building materials for the fort on Inchkeith in 1555. During the Scottish Reformation, in April 1560 English troops commanded by Lord Grey de Wilton marched from Berwick upon Tweed to join the Siege of Leith. Passing through Dunglass and East Linton, the English army camped at Prestongrange on 4 April where the lighter artillery pieces for the siege were landed from ships at Acheson's Haven.

The harbour was managed by Alexander Acheson, whose wife Isobel Gray died in 1565. Her inventory is an important record of the possessions of a wealthy Scottish woman. In September 1569 Regent Moray granted the custom duties of the "Newhaven of Preston" to Helen Acheson and her husband Archibald Stewart, a brother of James Stewart of Doune. The rights were entailed to Alexander Acheson of Gosford's son, also called Alexander Acheson.

Mark Acheson of Acheson's Haven undertook in 1587 to pay custom duties for salt exports to John Chisholm, comptroller of the Royal Artillery. In 1591 Euphame MacCalzean was convicted of witchcraft on several charges including attending an assembly of witches at "Atkynson's Haven" where an image of James VI was given to the devil for the destruction of the king. John Fian, Agnes Sampson and Barbara Napier were also said to have been at this meeting, and it was said a pact was made with Satan to send a mist and winds to drive the King's ship to England.

A part of the harbour structure known as the "bulwark" and "Millhaven" was demolished accidentally by the Margaret of Leith captained by Thomas Melville on 1 April 1607. His partners undertook to recompense the owner, Mark Kerr, 1st Earl of Lothian. There were glassworks at "Aichesonis Haven alias callit the Newhaven" by December 1625, when it was suspected that among the workers were Catholic recusants. This early manufactory may have been started by James Ord, who worked for the patent-holder Sir Gorge Hay, and was probably closed by Sir Robert Mansell around the year 1627.

By the middle of the 18th century, the Haven was a busy port, exporting oysters, salt, local glassware, ceramics, bricks, fireclay, coal, and chemicals, including sulphuric acid. Imports were brandy from France, port wine from Portugal, Delft china from the Low countries, leather from the Baltic port Danzig, and furs from Canada. A map of 1773 shows the port having two breakwaters.

The importance of the Haven is reflected in the fact that it has customs jurisdiction over the coastline from Figgate Burn, Portobello all the way to the Tyne at Belhaven.

In the late 19th century, ships from the Baltic brought rock salt to Morrison's Haven and exchanged it for coal and other commodities.

Up to the late 1920s, the Haven exported large amounts of coal and bricks. Then it became disused, and the harbour was filled in and the site was landscaped. At the same time, Prestongrange's traditional industries declined apace.

== Masons and Freemasons ==
There was a stonemasons' lodge in existence at Acheson's Haven from at least 1599. The written records of this lodge commence on 9 January 1599. The first item in the minutes is a copy of the "second statute" for working stonemasons devised by William Schaw, an administrator of the estates of Anne of Denmark and Master of Work or architect to the King and Queen of Scotland. The Schaw statutes give advice on taking apprentices and safety at work. A minute of 2 January 1599 demonstrates an old practice of the mason lodges. Andrew Patten was "entered" in the record as an apprentice mason to John Crafurd, only after working for his master for seven years.

Over time the 'operative' stonemasons admitted men who were not stonemasons and by the early 18th century it was recognizably a Masonic Lodge. The Lodge's Minutes are therefore the oldest records in the world of a Masonic Lodge. Although this lodge was represented at the foundation meeting of the Grand Lodge of Free and Accepted Masons of Scotland, on 30 November 1736, it decided not to participate and remained independent until 1814 when it finally become a daughter Lodge of the Grand Lodge of Scotland. The Lodge ceased to function in 1853. The Minute Books of the Lodge were put up for auction by descendants of the last Lodge Secretary and were purchased by the Grand Lodge of Scotland in July 1980.

== Morrison's Haven today ==
The Prestongrange Community Archaeological Project, started in 2004, confirmed the importance of Morrison's Haven. 18th century glass and pottery manufacture was totally dependent on the harbour. It developed into a mechanised working port and underwent frequent repair and improvement.

The PCA Project enabled local residents to learn skills related to archaeology.

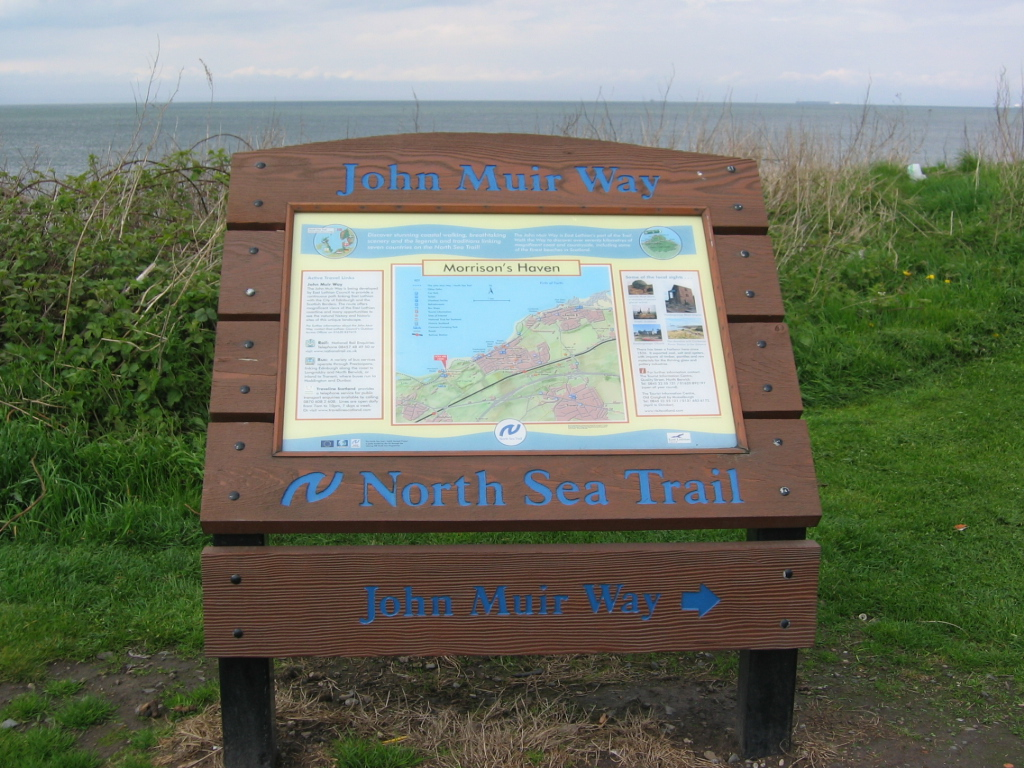
The John Muir Way at Morrison's Haven

The Haven is on the route of the John Muir Way, a long-distance footpath along the East Lothian coast, starting at Fisherrow and terminating at Dunglass.

== See also ==
- List of places in East Lothian
