= Thumbscrew (torture) =

Torture instrument

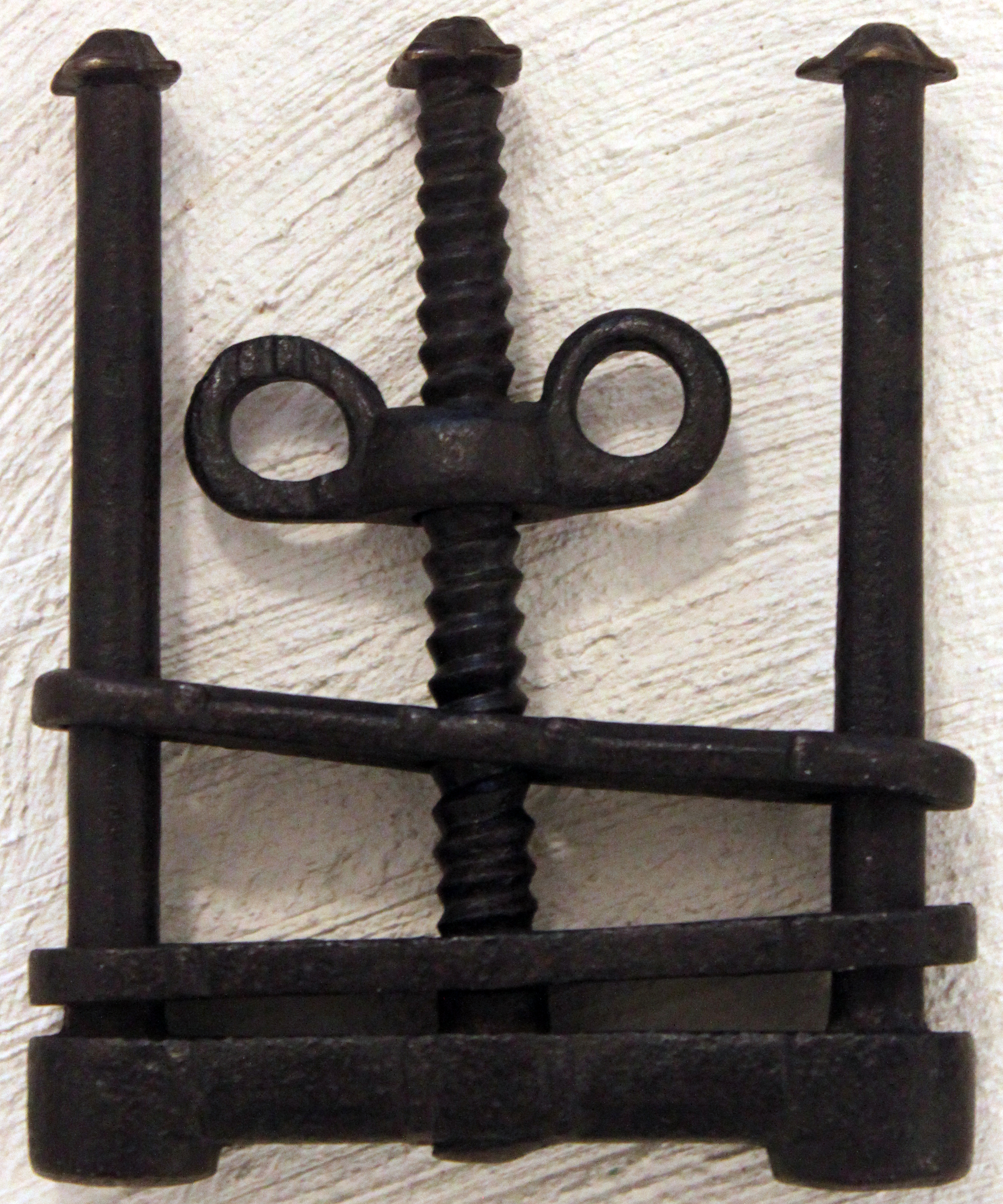
17th-century thumbscrew, Märkisches Museum Berlin

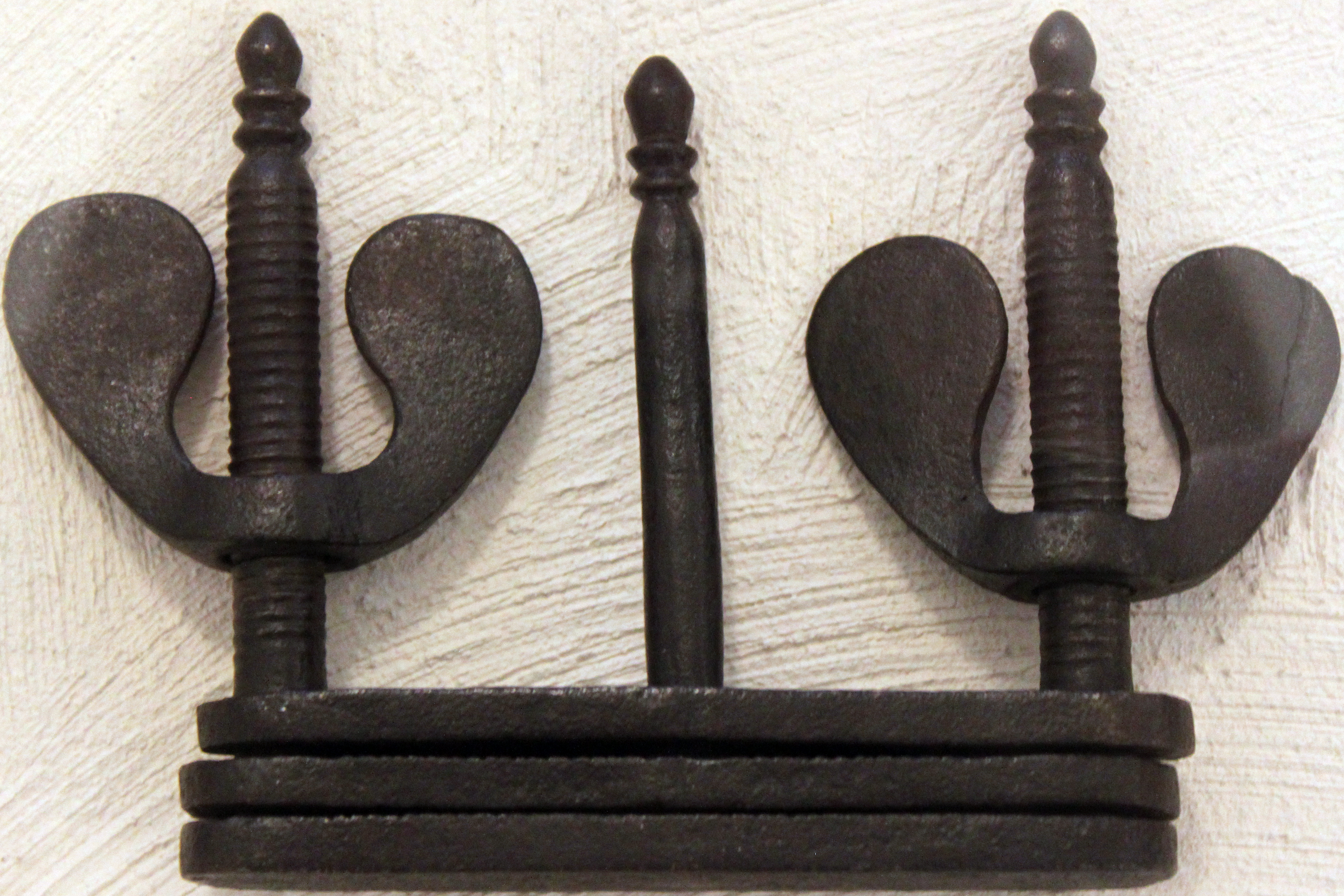
17th-century thumbscrew, Märkisches Museum Berlin

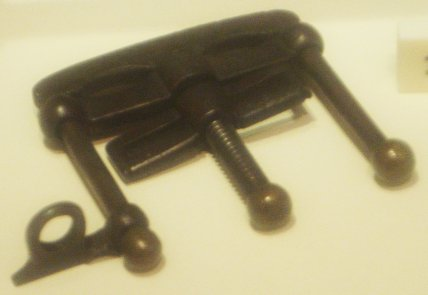
Scottish thumbscrew

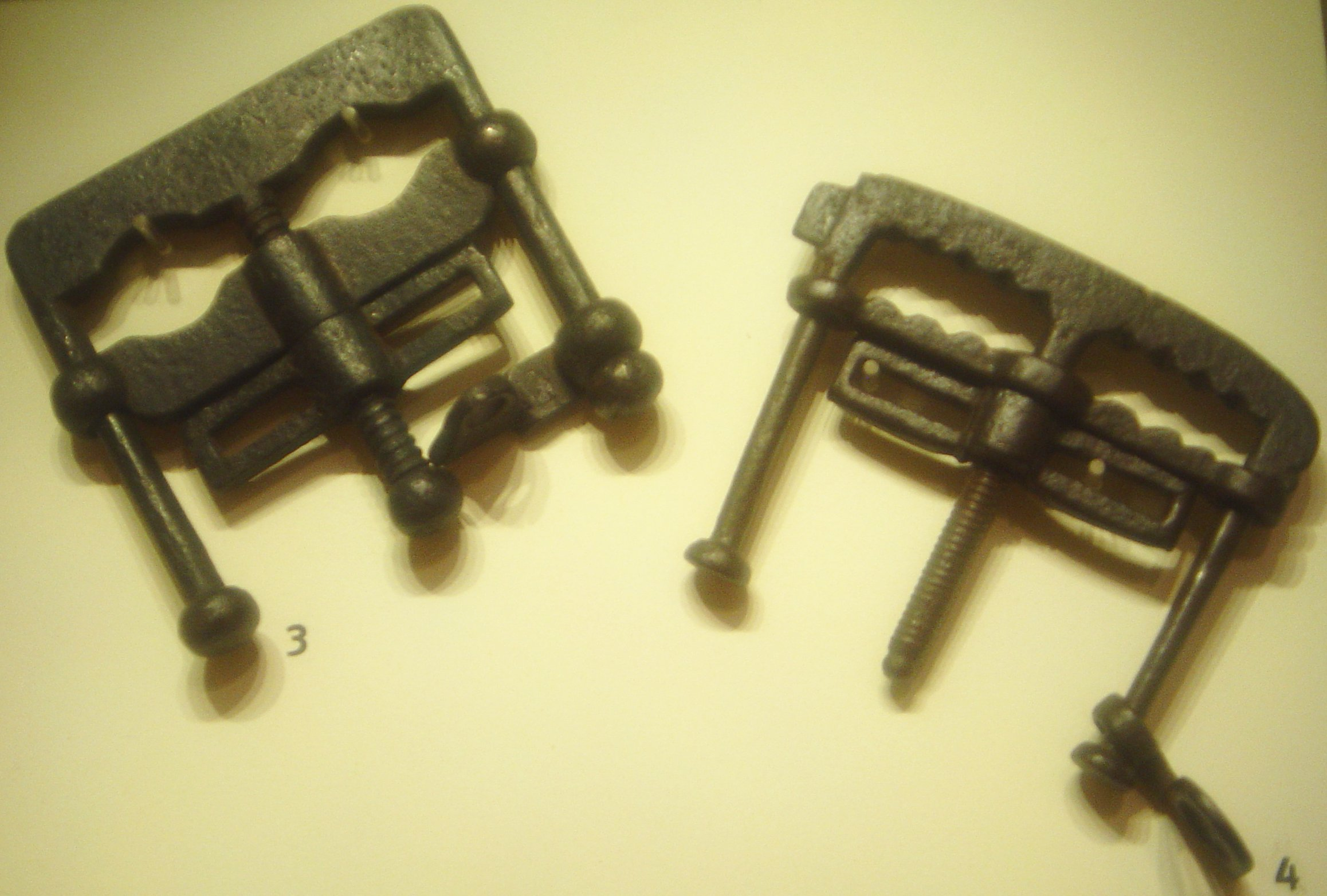
Scottish thumbscrews

The thumbscrew (also known as devil's handshake) is a torture instrument which was first used in early modern Europe. It is a simple vise, sometimes with protruding studs on the interior surfaces. Victims' fingers or toes were placed in the vise and slowly crushed. The crushing bars were sometimes lined with sharp metal points to puncture the nails. While the most common design operated upon a single thumb or big toe, variants could accommodate both big toes, all five fingers of one hand, or all ten toes.

== Other terminology ==
The thumbscrew was also referred to as thumbkin or thumbikin (1675–1685), "kin" being a diminutive suffix of nouns. An alternate spelling was thumbikens. The terms pillywinks and pilnie-winks were also in use.

Historians James Cochrane and John McCrone wrote in 1833,

Thus we read, that in 1596, the son and daughter of Aleson Balfour, who was accused of witchcraft were tortured before her to make her confess her crime in the manner following: Her son was put in the buits where he suffered fifty seven strokes; and her daughter about seven years old, was put in the pilniewinks. In the same case, mention was made, besides pilniewinks, pinniewinks or pilliwinks, of caspitanos or caspicaws, and of tosots, as instruments of torture. Lord Royston in his manuscript notes upon Mackenzie's criminal law conjectures that these may have been only other names for the buits and thumbikens; thus much seems certain, that in those times there was some torturing device applied to the fingers which bore the name of pilniewinks; but it will immediately appear, that the most authentic accounts assign the introduction and use of the instrument known by the name of thumbikens to a much later period.

== History ==
Cochrane and McCrone argue that the thumbscrew entered Britain later than the invasion of the Spanish Armada in the 16th century:

"It has been very generally asserted," says Dr. Jamieson, "that part of the cargo of the invincible Armada was a large assortment of thumbikens, which it was meant should be employed as powerful arguments for convincing the heretics." The country of the inquisition was certainly a fit quarter from whence to derive so congenial an instrument; but other accounts, as we have said, and these apparently unquestionable, assign it a later introduction... In the torturing of [William] Spence, Lord Fountainhall mentions the origin of the thumbikens, stating that this instrument "was a new invention used among the colliers upon transgressors, and discovered by Generals Dalyell and Drummond, they having seen them used in Muscovy." The account which Bishop Burnet gives of the torturing of Spence confirms the then recent use of the thumbikens. ... This point we think is put beyond all doubt by the following act of the privy council in 1684, quoted in Wodrow's invaluable history: "Whereas there is now a new invention and engine called the thumbikens ... the Lords of His Majesty's Council do therefore ordain, that when any person shall be put to the torture, that the boots and the thumbikens both be applied to them..."

In 1612 the Baroque painter Orazio Gentileschi accused his colleague, Agostino Tassi, of raping his daughter, the painter Artemisia Gentileschi. During the five-month long trial, Artemisia was cross-examined under thumb-screw torture.

As late as the mid-18th century, the ex-slave Olaudah Equiano, in his autobiography The Interesting Narrative of the Life of Olaudah Equiano, documented the use of thumbscrews to torture slaves. During this period (mid-18th century), Thomas Clarkson carried thumbscrews with him to further his cause for the abolition of the slave trade and later emancipation of slaves in the British Empire. He hoped to, and did, inspire empathy with the display of this and other torture devices used on slaves. They were used on slave ships, as witnessed and described by Equiano and Ottobah Cugoano.
