= Agnes Sampson =

16th-century Scottish healer and purported witch

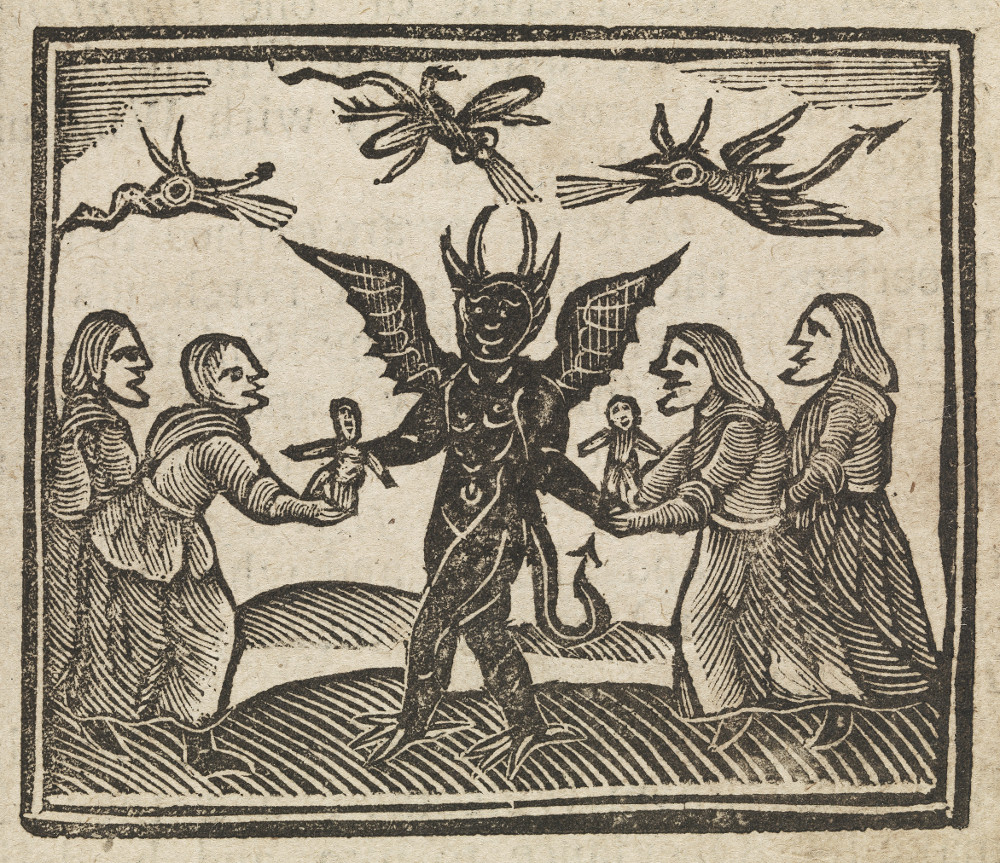
This image, from The History of Witches and Wizards (1720), depicts The Devil giving witches wax dolls

Agnes Sampson (died 28 January 1591) was a Scottish healer and purported witch. Also known as the "Wise Wife of Keith", Sampson was executed during the North Berwick witch trials in the last decade of the 16th century.

== Background ==
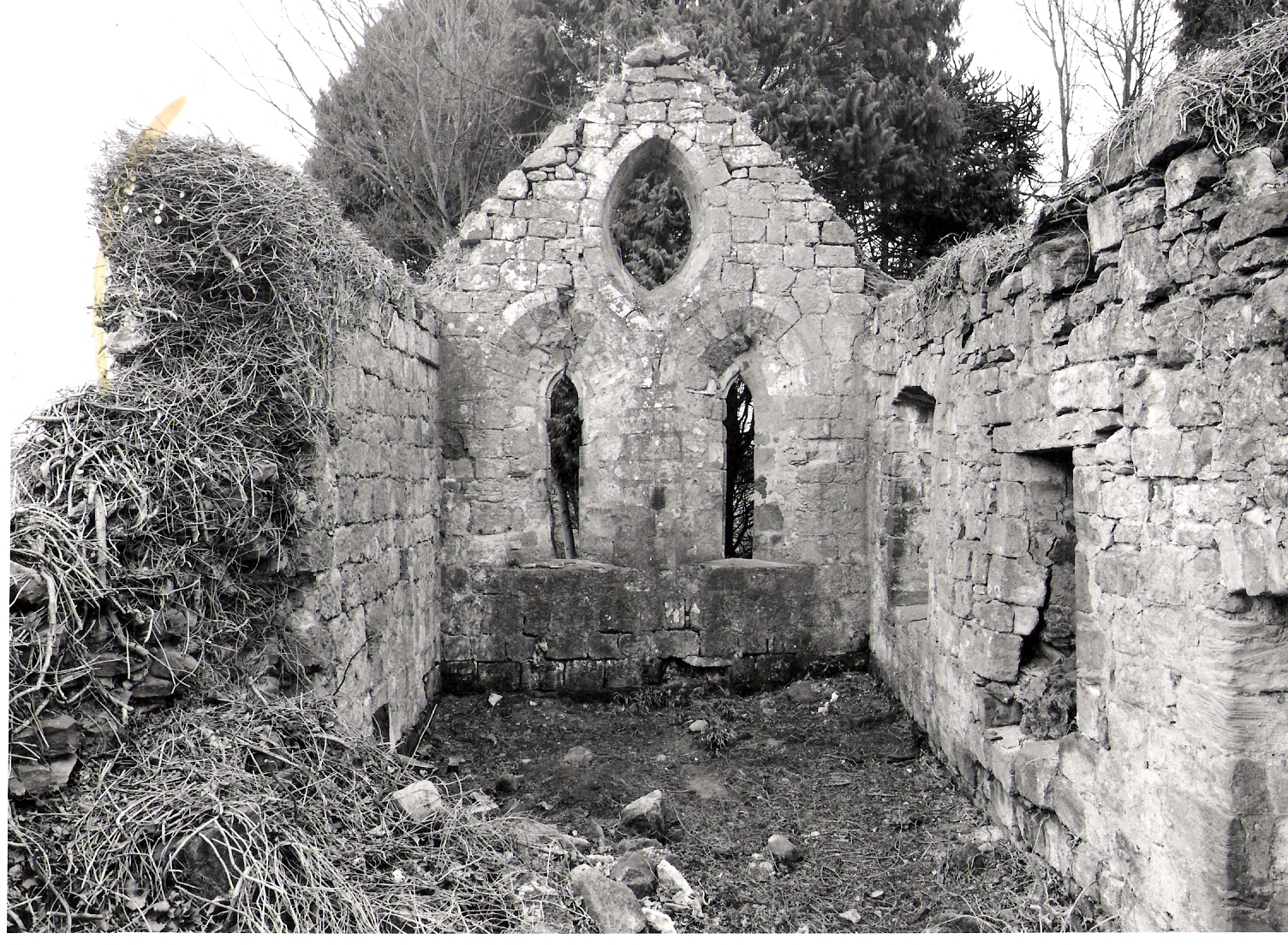
Ruins of the chapel at Keith Marischal. Agnes Sampson would have known this building

Sampson lived at Nether Keith, a part of the Keith Marischal barony, East Lothian, Scotland. She was considered to have healing powers and acted as a midwife. The indictment against her indicated that she was a poor widow, with children.

In the spring of 1590, James VI returned from Copenhagen after marrying Anne of Denmark, daughter of the King of Denmark-Norway. The Danish court at that time was greatly perplexed by witchcraft and the black arts, and this must have impressed King James. The voyage back from Denmark was beset by storms. In the following months a witch hunt began in Denmark, the Copenhagen witch trials, started by the Danish admiral Peder Munk. One of its victims was Anna Koldings, who gave the names of five women, including Malin, who was married to the burgomaster of Helsingor. The women confessed they had been guilty of witchcraft in raising storms that threatened Anne of Denmark's voyage, and sent devils to climb up the keel of her ship. In September 1590 two women were burnt as witches at Kronborg. James decided to set up his own tribunal in Scotland.

The story of the arrest, trial, and confessions of Agnes Sampson and the others accused of witchcraft is known from versions found in a pamphlet printed in London in 1591, the Newes from Scotland, and from contemporary letters and trial records.

The historian Edward J. Cowan argues that a tale told against her, recorded by James Melville of Halhill, of her receiving a gift of an image of James VI from the Devil on behalf of Francis Stewart, 5th Earl of Bothwell does not fit the chronological evidence. This supernatural event was said to have taken place by the sea at Morrison's Haven near Prestongrange. It was said the Devil appeared at Aitchison's Haven, as it was then called, in "likeness of ane Black man". Agnes Sampson was said to have made an image of the king for the Devil to enchant to cause the death of King James.

== Arrest and torture ==
By the autumn of 1590 Scotland was aflame with witch hunts and many of those sent to trial were questioned by the King himself. Agnes Sampson was accused by Gillis Duncan, arrested along with others and questioned about her role in the storm raising. She was put to torture and confessed after her body was shaved and her genitals were inspected to reveal a "privy mark" or witches' mark. These proceedings were described in the 1591 London publication Newes from Scotland:

(modernised) This aforesaid Agnes Sampson which was the elder Witch, was taken and brought to Holyrood Palace before the Kings Majesty and sundry other of the nobility of Scotland, where she was straightly examined, but all the persuasions which the Kings majesty used to her with the rest of his counsel, might not provoke or induce her to confess any thing, but stood stiffly in the denial of all that was laid to her charge: whereupon they caused her to be confined away to prison, there to receive such torture as hath been lately provided for witches in that country: and for as much as by due examination of witchcraft and witches in Scotland, it has lately been found that the Devil does generally mark them with a privy mark, by reason the Witches have confessed themselves, that the Devil doth lick them with his tongue in some private part of their body, before he doth receive them to be his servants, which mark commonly is given them under the hair in some part of their body, whereby it may not easily be found out or seen, although they be searched: and generally so long as the mark is not seen to those which search them, so long the parties that has the mark will never confess anything. Therefore by special commandment, Agnes Sampson had all her hair shaven off, in each part of her body, and her head "thrawen" (constricted) with a rope according to the custom of that Country, being a pain most grievous, which she continued almost an hour, during which time she would not confess any thing until the Devil's mark was found upon her privates, then she immediately confessed whatsoever was demanded of her, and justifying those persons aforesaid to be notorious witches.

== Raising storms and contrary winds ==
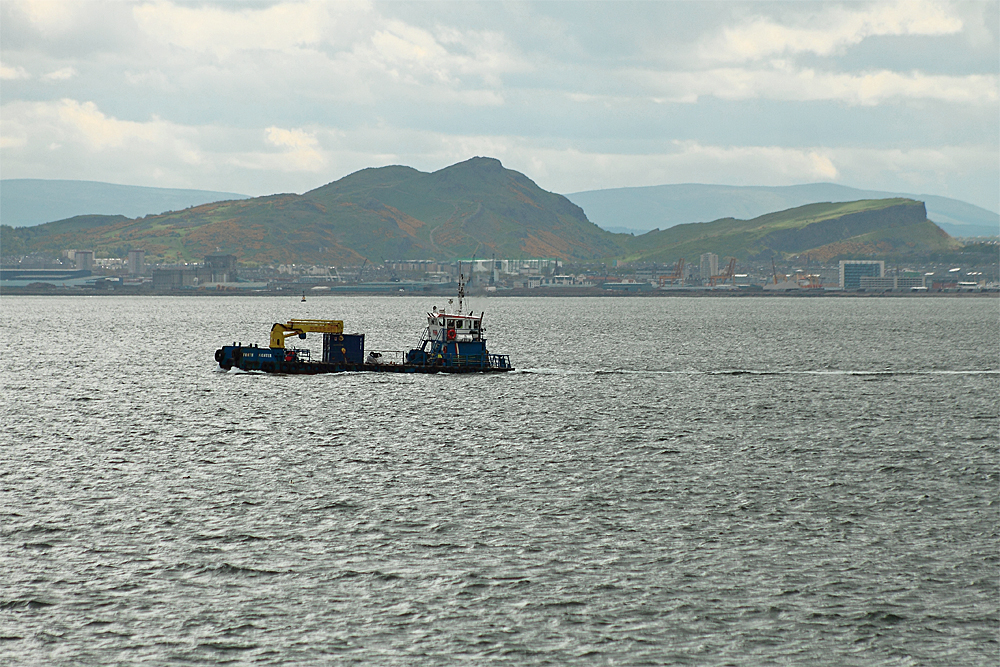
Agnes Sampson was supposed to have made a charm to raise a storm on the Forth and change the winds in the North Sea

According to the Newes from Scotland, Agnes Sampson confessed to causing the storm that drowned Jane Kennedy on 7 September 1589 when ferry boats collided during a sudden storm on the Forth. She had made a charm by sinking a dead cat, to which her companions had attached parts of dead man, into the sea near Leith. The same charm raised the storm and weather effects that threatened the king on his return voyage from Denmark in 1590.

Agnes Sampson used the phrase "contrary wind", and this frequently appears in contemporary correspondence describing voyages, but Agnes Sampson used it in a special sense. She said that the king's ship experienced "a contrary wind to the rest of ships, then being in his company, which thing was most strange and true, as the King's Majesty acknowledges, for when the rest of the ships had a fair and good wind, then was the wind contrary and altogether against his Majesty". The rest of the fleet were able to sail ahead, while the king's ship alone was becalmed or driven back.

This seems to be an incident described in the chronicle by David Moysie. When James VI set sail for Norway his ship was driven back to St Monans in Fife. This weather condition was perhaps not uncommon in the Forth, in May 1583 a ship belonging to James Gourlay carrying Manningville, a French ambassador, was driven back to Burntisland by a "contrary wind".

== Sampson and the English ambassador ==
The English ambassador Robert Bowes wrote in December 1590 that Sampson had confessed to the King himself, and mentioned attempts to obtain the king's shirt or other personal linen in order to work charms. On 27 January she confessed that the Devil had offered to help her and her children because she was a poor widow. The Devil appeared to her as a black man, a dog, or a hay rick. She had attended a witch's convent at North Berwick with her son-in-law. They collected bones and powdered them for charms against the pains of childbirth.

Sampson said that Robert Bowes was "a little black and fat man with black hair", who had given the accused gold in a cellar while James VI was in Denmark to make a charm with a toad to hurt the king and make him infertile. Bowes noted that this personal description was inaccurate. Sampson said she had made a wax image of her father-in-law for a woman who complained about his behaviour.

== Sampson questioned by King James ==
According to the Newes from Scotland, Agnes Sampson was interviewed by James VI, who was sceptical of the material in the confessions, and she told him things about the conversation he had on his wedding night with Anne of Denmark in Oslo, that she could not have known:

Item, the saide Agnis Sampson confessed before the Kings Maiestie sundrye thinges which were so miraculous and strange, as that his Maiestie saide they were all extreame lyars, wherat she answered, she would not wishe his Maiestie to suppose her woords to be false, but rather to beleeue them, in that she would discouer such matter vnto him as his maiestie should not any way doubt off. And therupon taking his Maiestie a little aside, she declared vnto him the verye woordes which passed betweene the Kings Maiestie and his Queene at Upslo in Norway the first night of their mariage, with their answere eache to other: whereat the Kinges Maiestie wondered greatlye, and swore by the liuing God, that he beleeued that all the Diuels in hell could not haue discouered the same: acknowledging her woords to be most true, and therefore gaue the more credit to the rest which is before declared.

— News from Scotland

== Execution ==
James VI had not been convinced of Sampson's guilt prior to this last confession, but afterwards changed his mind. On 27 January 1591 the charges of witchcraft against her were drawn up with fifty three points or "articles of dittay" (that is, articles of indictment).

Agnes Sampson was taken to the scaffold on Castlehill, where she was garroted then burnt at the stake on 28 January 1591.

Edinburgh Burgh treasurer's accounts itemise the cost of Agnes Sampson's execution, giving the date of the purchases as the 16 January 1591 and the cost as £6 8s 10d. Scots. Robert Bowes wrote that her execution took place on 28 January 1591.

The interrogations of Agnes Sampson implicated several other women. She and Barbara Napier were said to have met at Dalkieth and "Camroune-brig-end" for friendly talks and to "contract hameliness". Agnes Sampson was said to have helped cure an illness of John Duncan who lived in Musselburgh. In 1614, his widow, Geillis Johnstone, was accused of witchcraft, and the charges against her included consulting with "Annie Sampsone" for her husband's care.

== Legacy ==
Sampson is a featured figure on Judy Chicago's installation piece The Dinner Party, being represented as one of the 999 names on the Heritage Floor.

Sampson is also referenced multiple times in Shadow of Night by Deborah Harkness.

The raising of storms and a ghost based on Sampson feature in the short story "Leave Fast the Knot of Four" by Peter Wise in Disturbing the Water, a collection of themed original ghost stories set around rivers, lakes and the sea.

Sampson is referenced in "Traitor", the seventh episode of American Horror Story: Apocalypse, as having perfected a poison powder that is only fatal to men, after one of the warlocks claims to have invented the powder himself.

The first episode of the BBC TV series Lucy Worsley Investigates, broadcast in May 2022, explored what happened to Agnes Sampson during the witch hunts.

== See also ==
- Francis Stewart, 1st Earl of Bothwell
- Newes from Scotland
