= Four Last Songs discography =

Chronological – by no means complete – list of recordings of Richard Strauss' Vier letzte Lieder.

== Recordings ==
Year	Artist	Conductor Orchestra / or Pianist	Label Catalogue number
1950	Kirsten Flagstad	Wilhelm Furtwängler; Philharmonia Orchestra	CD: Testament; Cat: SBT1410
1951	Sena Jurinac	Fritz Busch; Stockholm Philharmonic Orchestra	CD: EMI "Références"; Cat: CDH 7 63199 2
1953	Elisabeth Schwarzkopf	Otto Ackermann; Philharmonia Orchestra	CD: Naxos "Historical"; Cat: 8.111145
1953	Lisa Della Casa	Karl Böhm; Wiener Philharmoniker	CD: Decca "Legends"; Cat: 000289 467 1182 8 CD: Naxos "Historical"; Cat: 8.111347
1955	Christel Goltz	Heinrich Hollreiser; Pro Musica Orchestra	LP: VOX Classics; Cat: PL 9400
1956	Elisabeth Schwarzkopf	Herbert von Karajan; Philharmonia Orchestra	CD: Urania; Cat: URN 22. 379
1958	Inge Borkh	Ferdinand Leitner; Orchestre Symphonique de Vichy	CD: Ponto Recordings; Cat: PONTO 1010
1958	Lois Marshall	Thomas Beecham; Concertgebouworkest	CD: Gala; Cat: GL 100.799
1961	Sena Jurinac	Malcolm Sargent; BBC Symphony Orchestra	CD: BBC "Legends"; Cat: BBCL 4107-2
1961	Teresa Stich-Randall	Ernest Ansermet; Orchestre de la Suisse Romande	CD: Cascavalle; Cat: VEL 3135
1964	Elisabeth Schwarzkopf	George Szell; Concertgebouworkest	CD: Audiophile Classics; Cat: APL 101.548
1964	Evelyn Lear	Karl Böhm; Wiener Philharmoniker	CD: VAI Music; Cat: VAIA 1159
1964	Hanne-Lore Kuhse	Václav Neumann; Gewandhausorchester Leipzig	CD: Berlin Classics; Cat: BC 2075–2
1965	Elisabeth Schwarzkopf	George Szell; Radio-Symphonieorchester Berlin	CD: EMI Classics "Great Recordings of the Century"; Cat: 0724356696020
1967	Martina Arroyo	Günter Wand; Kölner Rundfunk-Sinfonie-Orchester	CD: Profil Medien; Cat: PH06005
1968	Gundula Janowitz	Bernard Haitink; Concertgebouworkest	CD: Philips "Dutch Masters - Bernard Haitink"; Cat: 462 947–2
1970	Birgit Nilsson	Leif Segerstam; Sveriges Radios symfoniorkester	CD: Bluebell; Cat: ABCD 009
1970	Eleanor Steber	James Levine; Cleveland Institute of Music Orchestra	CD: VAI Music; Cat: VAIA 1012
1974	Leontyne Price	Erich Leinsdorf; New Philharmonia Orchestra	CD: RCA Victor; Cat: nla
1974	Gundula Janowitz	Herbert von Karajan; Berliner Philharmoniker	CD: Deutsche Grammophon "The Originals"; Cat: 000289 447 4222 0
1976	Elisabeth Söderström	Antal Doráti; Royal Philharmonic Orchestra	CD: BBC "Legends"; Cat: BBCL 4153-2
1976	Montserrat Caballé	Alain Lombard; Orchestre Philharmonique de Strasbourg	LP: Erato; Cat: STU 71054
1976	Teresa Żylis-Gara	Franz-Paul Decker; Rundfunk-Sinfonieorchester Hannover	LP: Rodolphe; Cat: RP 12 392
1977	Aase Nordmo Løvberg	Okko Kamu; Oslo Philharmonic Orchestra	CD: Simax; Cat: PSC 1803
1977	Lucia Popp	Georg Solti; Chicago Symphony Orchestra	DVD-Video: Decca; Cat: 074 3203
1979	Kiri Te Kanawa	Andrew Davis; London Symphony Orchestra	CD: Sony Classical; Cat: SMK89881
1981	Sylvia Sass	Ervin Lukács; Hungarian State Orchestra	LP: Hungaroton; Cat: SLPX 12397
1981	Heather Harper	Norman Del Mar; Royal Philharmonic Orchestra	CD: Carlton Classics; Cat: 15656 91382
1982	Roberta Alexander	Adam Gatehouse; National Youth Orchestra of the Netherlands	LP: Eurosound; Cat: ES 46.583
1982	Elisabeth Söderström	Richard Armstrong; Welsh National Opera Orchestra	LP: EMI; Cat: ASD 4103
1982	Lucia Popp	Klaus Tennstedt; London Philharmonic Orchestra	CD: EMI Classics; Cat: 0724358643725
1982	Jessye Norman	Kurt Masur; Gewandhausorchester Leipzig	CD: Philips Classics; Cat: 000289 464 7422 8
1983	Elly Ameling	Wolfgang Sawallisch; Concertgebouworkest	CD: Heartselling; Cat: GW 80003
1985	Anna Tomowa-Sintow	Herbert von Karajan; Berliner Philharmoniker	CD: Deutsche Grammophon; Cat: 419 188-2
1985	Éva Marton	Andrew Davis; Toronto Symphony Orchestra	LP: CBS; Cat: IM 42019
1986	Felicity Lott	Neeme Järvi; Royal Scottish National Orchestra	CD: Chandos; Cat: CHAN 8518
1987	Heather Harper	Richard Hickox; London Symphony Orchestra	CD: EMI Classics; Cat: 2283742
1988	Arleen Auger	André Previn; Wiener Philharmoniker	CD: Telarc; Cat: CD-80180
1990	Kiri Te Kanawa	Georg Solti; Wiener Philharmoniker	CD: Decca; Cat: 000289 430 5112 5
1991	Gwyneth Jones	Roberto Paternostro; Tokyo Symphony Orchestra	CD: KOCH Schwann; Cat: 314 081
1992	Júlia Várady	Kurt Masur; Gewandhausorchester Leipzig	DVD-Video: Digital Classics; Cat: 1008DC
1993	Cheryl Studer	Giuseppe Sinopoli; Staatskapelle Dresden	CD: Deutsche Grammophon; Cat: 000289 439 8652 6
1993	Elisabeth Meyer-Topsøe	Hans Norbert Bihlmaier; Sjællands Symfoniorkester	CD: Kontrapunkt; Cat: 32156
1993	Charlotte Margiono	Edo de Waart; Radio Filharmonisch Orkest Holland	CD: Brilliant Classics; Cat: 9065
1993	Lucia Popp	Michael Tilson Thomas; London Symphony Orchestra	CD: Sony Classical; Cat: SK 48242
1995	Barbara Hendricks	Wolfgang Sawallisch; Philadelphia Orchestra	CD: EMI Classics; Cat: CDC5 5099950466528
1995	Renée Fleming	Christoph Eschenbach; Houston Symphony Orchestra	CD: RCA; Cat: 09026 68539 2
1995	Carole Farley	José Serebrier; Czech State Philharmonic Orchestra	CD: BMG; Cat: 756055700227
1995	Joanna Borowska	Friedrich Haider; Cracow Radio Symphony Orchestra	CD: Nightingale Classics; Cat: NC161864-2
1996	Hellen Kwon	Adrian Leaper; Orquesta Filarmónica de Gran Canaria	CD: Arte Nova; Cat: 74321 54466 2
1998	Barbara Bonney	Malcolm Martineau, piano	CD: Decca; Cat: 460 812-2
1998	Deborah Voigt	Kurt Masur; New York Philharmonic Orchestra	CD: Teldec; Cat: 3984-25990-2
1998	Karita Mattila	Claudio Abbado; Berliner Philharmoniker	CD: Deutsche Grammophon; Cat: 445 182-2
1999	Gabriele Fontana	Erik Werba, piano	CD: Preiser Records; Cat: PR93377
1999	Jane Eaglen	Donald Runnicles; London Symphony Orchestra	CD: Sony; Cat: SK 61720
1999	Karita Mattila	Claudio Abbado; Berliner Philharmoniker	CD: Deutsche Grammophon; Cat: 000289 445 1822 1
1999	Gitta-Maria Sjöberg	Jan Wagner; Odense Symfoniorkester	DVD-Audio: Silverline; Cat: 288119-9
2001	Soile Isokoski	Marek Janowski; Rundfunk-Sinfonieorchester Berlin	CD: Ondine; Cat: ODE982-2
2002	Melanie Diener	David Zinman; Tonhalle Orchester Zürich	CD: Arte Nova; Cat: 74321 95999 2
2004	Georgina von Benza	Marco De Prosperis; Rundfunk-Sinfonieorchester Saarbrücken	CD: TADE International; Cat: TADECD 002
2004	Anne Schwanewilms	Mark Elder; The Hallé	CD: BBC; Cat: BBC MM270
2004	Michaela Kaune	Eiji Oue; NDR Radiophilharmonie	CD: Berlin Classics; Cat: 0017812BC
2004	Nancy Yuen	Somtow Sucharitkul; Siam Philharmonc Orchestra	CD: Orchid Music; Cat: OM-0401
2005	Konrad Jarnot	Helmut Deutsch, piano	CD: Oehms Classics; Cat: OC 518
2006	Christine Brewer	Donald Runnicles; Atlanta Symphony Orchestra	CD: Telarc; Cat: CD-80661
2006	Ricarda Merbeth	Michael Halász; Staatskapelle Weimar	CD: Naxos; Cat: 8.570283
2006	Nina Stemme	Antonio Pappano; Orchestra of the Royal Opera House, London	CD: EMI Classics; Cat: 0094637879726
2006	Ricarda Merbeth	Gianluigi Gelmetti; Sydney Symphony Orchestra	CD: Sydney Symphony Recordings; Cat: SSO 200803
2007	Qilian Chen	Dirk Brossé; Shanghai Opera House Orchestra	CD: Pavane Records; Cat: ADW 7542
2007	Anja Harteros	Fabio Luisi; Sächsische Staatskapelle Dresden	CD: Sony Classical; Cat: 88697 14197-2
2007	Barbara Krieger	Heiko Mathias Förster; Berliner Symphoniker	CD: Brilliant Classics; Cat: 8957
2007	Waltraud Meier	Joseph Breinl, piano	CD: Farao Classics; Cat: B 108033
2008	Yvonne Kenny	Johannes Fritzsch; Queensland Symphony Orchestra	CD: ABC Classics; Cat: ABC 476 3954
2009	Renée Fleming	Christian Thielemann; Münchner Philharmoniker	CD: Decca; Cat: 000289 478 1074 2
2009	Anja Harteros	Mariss Jansons; Symphonieorchester des Bayerischen Rundfunks	CD: BR-Klassik; Cat: 900707
2009	Aga Mikolaj	Karl Sollak; WDR Rundfunfunkorchester Köln	CD: CPO; Cat: 777 641-2
2010	Polina Pasztircsák	Alexander Rahbari; Musikkollegium Winterthur	CD: Nascor; Cat: NS07
2010	Dorothea Röschmann	Yannick Nézet-Séguin; Rotterdam Philharmonic Orchestra	SACD: BIS Records; Cat: BIS-SACD-1880
2011	Anne Schwanewilms	Markus Stenz; Gürzenich-Orchester Köln	CD: Orfeo; Cat: C 858 121 A
2011	Lisa Larsson	Douglas Boyd; Musikkollegium Winterthur	SACD: Dabringhaus und Grimm; Cat: MDG 901 1738-6
2013	Erika Sunnegårdh	Will Humburg; Malmö Symphony Orchestra	MP3: Cat: 888174 304687
2014	Anna Netrebko	Daniel Barenboim; Staatskapelle Berlin	CD: Deutsche Grammophon; Cat: 0289 479 3964 1
2014	Erin Wall	Andrew Davis; Melbourne Symphony Orchestra	CD: ABC Classics; Cat: ABC 481 1122
