= James Barroun =

Scottish merchant (died 1569)

James Barroun or Baron (died 1569) was a wealthy Scottish merchant based in Edinburgh and supporter of the Scottish Reformation.

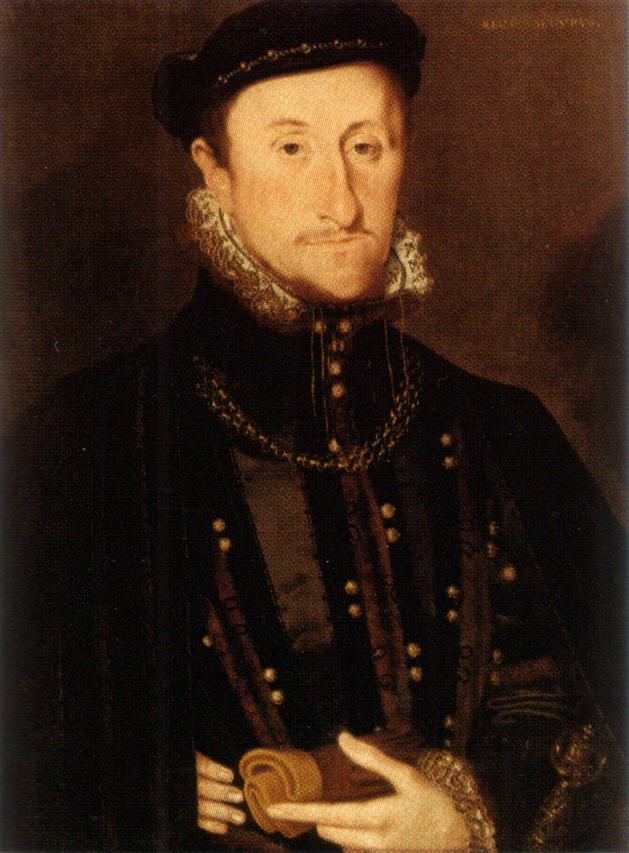
James Barroun made loans to Regent Moray secured on the jewels of Mary, Queen of Scots

== Career ==
He was a member of a family of Edinburgh merchants and became a burgess and member of the guild in 1547. In 1558 his kinsman Patrick Barroun obtained paintings in Flanders for Mary of Guise, Regent of Scotland.

James Barroun was primarily a textile merchant, and his will lists the luxury fabrics in his shop or booth and work house in detail, and the farmstock of his estate at Kinnaird in Dairsie, Fife. He supplied textiles and hosiery to Regent Arran. In January 1548 he provided white taffeta to line the purple velvet gown, the "rob ryall" or robe-royal, for the wedding of Barbara Hamilton after Mary of Guise rejected inferior cloth. In March 1558 he sold 12 great double hanks of gold embroidery thread to Mary of Guise.

In February 1558 the Italian cloth merchant and banker Timothy Cagnioli provided finance for Mary, Queen of Scots' half-brother, James Stewart, Commendator of St Andrews, to travel to Paris to complete the marriage contract of Mary and the Dauphin. Cagnioli gave letters of credit worth £6,687 Scots. His mother, Margaret Erskine, Lady of Lochleven, made a bond for repayment with the Clerk Register, James MacGill, James Barroun, and another Edinburgh merchant, James Adamson (a connection of Barroun's wife).

In February 1559, the burgh council of Edinburgh and the Provost, George Seton, 7th Lord Seton, decided to hold a banquet for Mary of Guise. Silk, taffeta, and other materials for the banquet, costing in total 100 French crowns were bought from James Barroun. As Dean of Guild, in April 1560, Barroun was asked to organise repairs at St Giles' Kirk, including repairs to windows and plastering or whitewashing.

As the Scottish Reformation progressed, Barroun was asked to dismantle and remove the Mary bell of St Giles' Kirk. In August and September 1560, the ornaments of St Giles were delivered to James Barroun for safekeeping as Dean of Guild. These included the chalice, patten, and spoon, the arm of St Giles (delivered by Thomas McCalzean, father of Euphame MacCalzean), two silver censers, and a silver ship, the great silver cross, a silver chrismarium with a wooden container for oil, and a goldsmith Michael Gilbert produced two silver chandeliers or lamps. The burgh council had decided to sell the church silver and vestments to fund its works, especially that of reforming the fabric of St Giles for Protestant worship. Barroun was asked to have the metal of the bells and the pillars of the baldacchino cast into artillery for the town, either in Scotland or Flanders.

In August 1560, Barroun, as Dean of Guild, made a complaint or submission to the burgh council about those who worked as "free merchants" and "free craftsmen" in Edinburgh, and enjoyed various privileges, but were not burgesses of the town. The council's response was to order that lists of unfree merchants and craftsmen should be made, and they should be compelled to become free members.

In June 1561 James Barroun was asked by the town council to request the return of their artillery from Edinburgh Castle. This proved to be difficult and there was a dispute over negotiations held with the Laird of Drumquhassill.

In 1562 Barroun arranged an interview between John Knox and the Earl of Bothwell in his own house. Bothwell spoke to Knox about his quarrel with James Hamilton, 3rd Earl of Arran.

James Barroun was a friend of James Stewart, Earl of Moray, who became Regent of Scotland when Mary, Queen of Scots was imprisoned in Lochleven Castle and coerced into abdication. In order to raise money, Regent Moray asked the treasurer of Scotland, Robert Richardson to utilise the jewels of Mary, Queen of Scots to raise loans. Barroun lent money to Moray and held Mary's diamond crucifix, an emerald pendant, and other jewels as a pledge.

He died in September 1569.

== Family ==
His first wife was Elizabeth Adamson. He married secondly, Helen Lesley or Leslie (d. 1577), the "Goodwife of Kinnaird". After Barroun's death she married James Kirkcaldy, whose brother, Regent Moray's friend William Kirkcaldy of Grange, Captain of Edinburgh Castle, unexpectedly declared for Mary in 1570.

His daughter Helen Barroun married Hercules Rollock, master of Edinburgh's college. Rollock wrote verses for and about the Entry and coronation of Anne of Denmark.

Another member of the family, Martha Barroun, was married to the kirk minister Patrick Simson. Her nephew was Jacob Barroun, another Edinburgh textile merchant, who died in July 1610. His will mentions cousins living in Antwerp, Amsterdam, and La Rochelle. In 1590, Jacob Barroun lent money to James Lumsden of Airdrie, Fife, on the security of a jewel which Lumsden had obtain from Jean Lyon, Countess of Angus, but it was discovered that the jewel belonged to the king. Jacob Barroun formed a partnership with Archibald Johnstone to export Scottish lead to Veere in 1599, and there was a dispute over customs duty.
