= John Cunningham (goldsmith) =

Scottish goldsmith (died 1635)

John Cunningham (died 1635) was a Scottish goldsmith and merchant burgess of Edinburgh.

== Career ==
He joined the Edinburgh goldsmith craft by making an essay or apprentice piece in March 1588. He served as one of the four masters of the craft in the years 1590, 1601, 1607, and 1618.

Cunningham made two symbolic keys to Edinburgh which were presented to Anne of Denmark in May 1590, during her ceremonial entry to Edinburgh. He also supplied a pearl worth £10 Scots to the jewel given to the queen.

Cunningham helped Robert Bowes, an English ambassador in Scotland. He forwarded news of the activities of the Earl of Argyll, and one of his associates John Auchinross. Auchinross sent money to Cunningham to buy lady's gloves and plate gauntlets for the Earl of Argyll.

In 1600, Cunningham disputed the ownership of some jewels with a Flemish clockmaker based in Edinburgh, Adrian Bodwyne. Bodwyne took the case to the Court of Session, claiming that Edinburgh's bailie court would be biased against him, and he suffered delays because he was a "stranger".
