= Entry and coronation of Anne of Denmark =

1590 ceremony in Edinburgh, Scotland

Coronation of Anne of Denmark
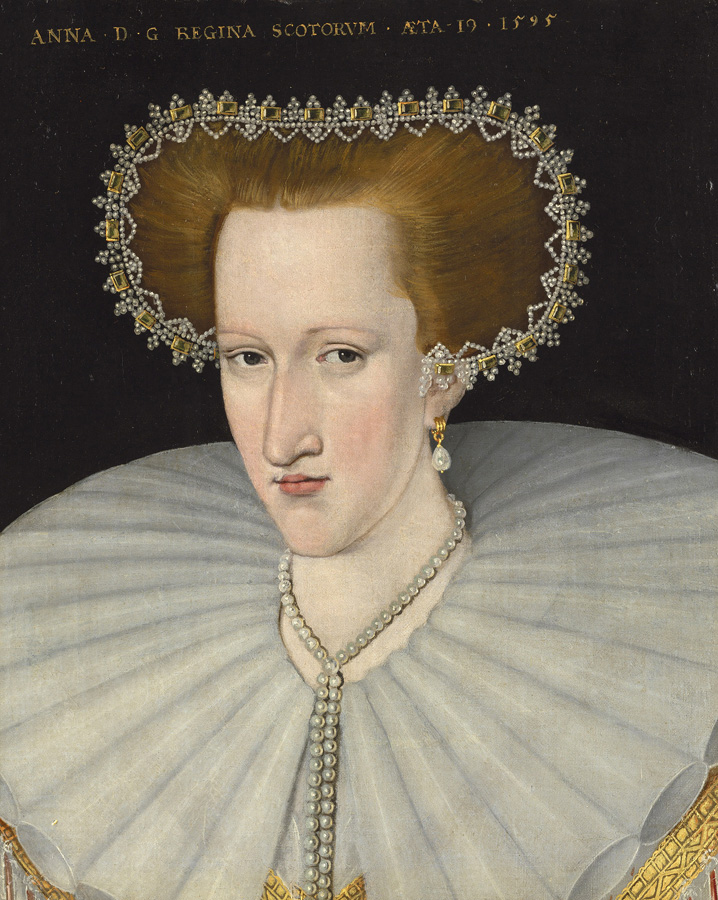
- Anne of Denmark in a 1595 portrait

- Location within Edinburgh city centre
- Date: 17 May 1590
- Venue: Holyrood Abbey
- Location: 55°57′11″N 3°10′18″W
- Type: Royal coronation
- Participants: Anne of Denmark; Robert Bruce of Kinnaird

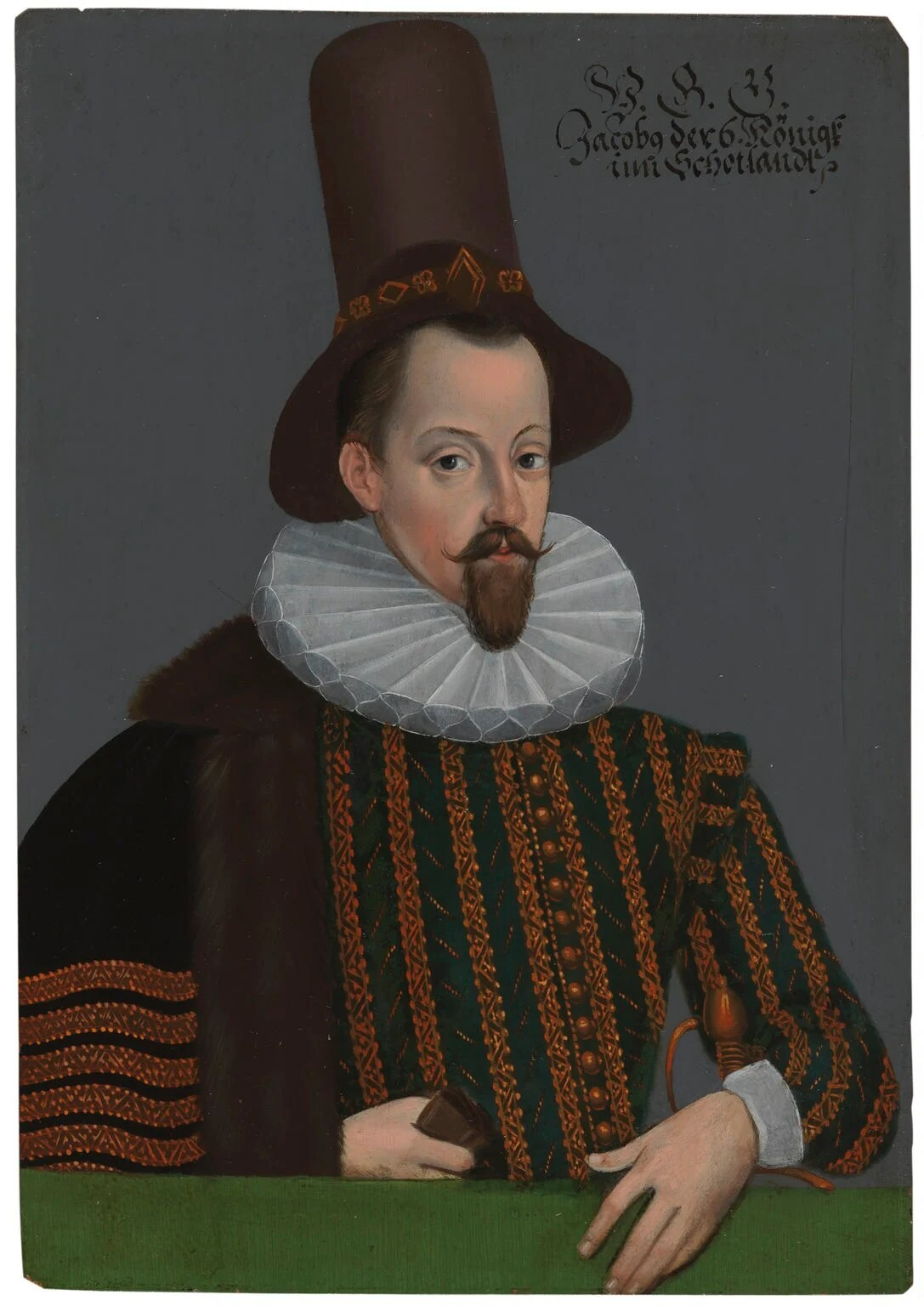
James VI, painted in 1590.

On 17 May 1590, Anne of Denmark was crowned Queen of Scotland. There was also a ceremony of joyous entry into Edinburgh on 19 May, an opportunity for spectacle and theatre and allegorical tableaux promoting civic and national identities, similar in many respects to those performed in many other European towns. Celebrations for the arrival of Anne of Denmark in Scotland had been planned and prepared for September 1589, when it was expected she would sail from Denmark with the admirals Peder Munk and Henrik Gyldenstierne. She was delayed by accidents and poor weather and James VI of Scotland joined her in Norway in November. They returned to Scotland in May 1590.

== September 1589 ==
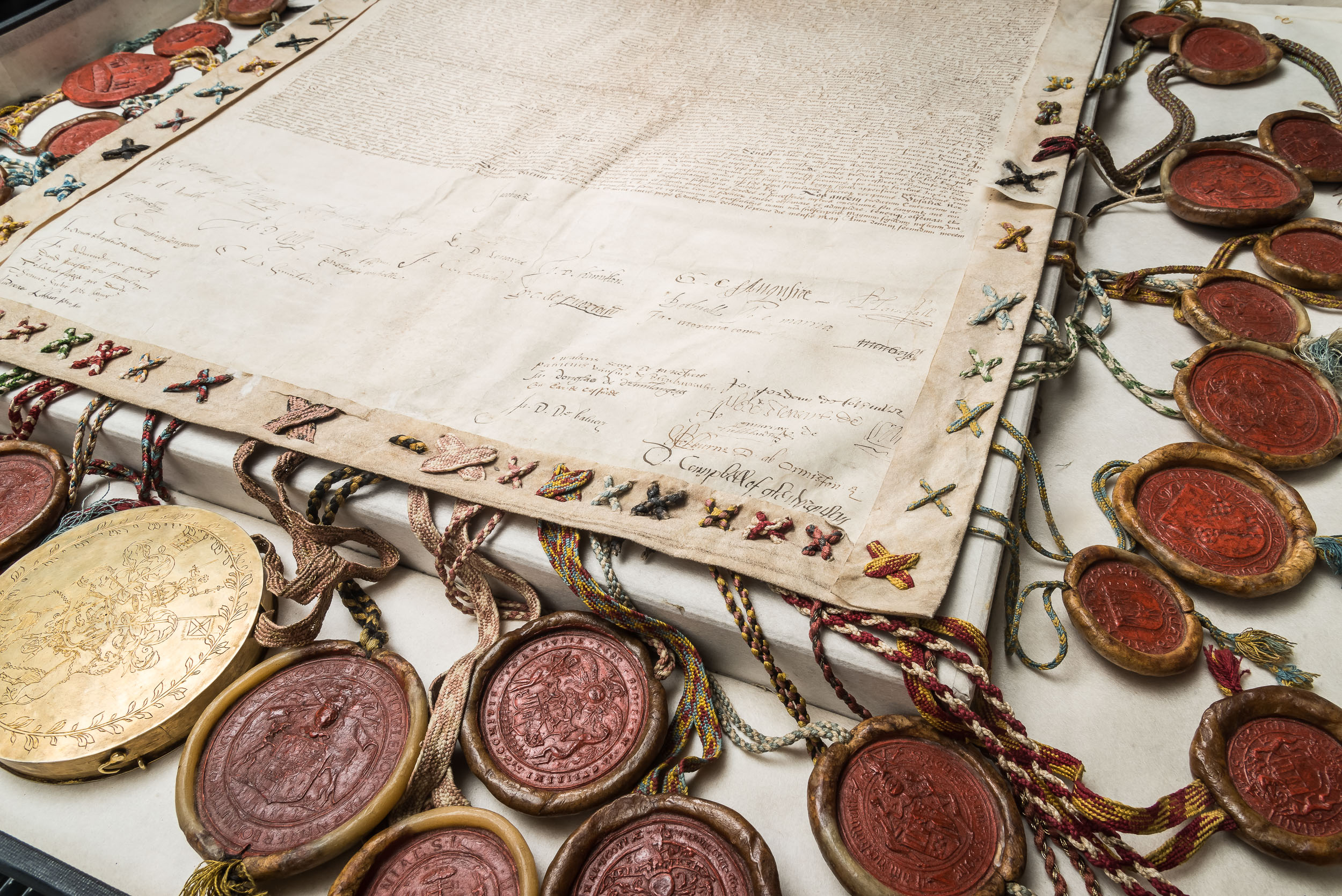
Marriage contract, Rigsarkivet

On 30 August 1589 James VI declared to the commissioners of his burgh towns that his marriage negotiations were concluded, and his bride Anne of Denmark was expected to arrive in Scotland. She would be accompanied by Danish aristocrats and dignitaries. James VI wanted the towns to advance £20,000 Scots for entertaining the new queen and her entourage.

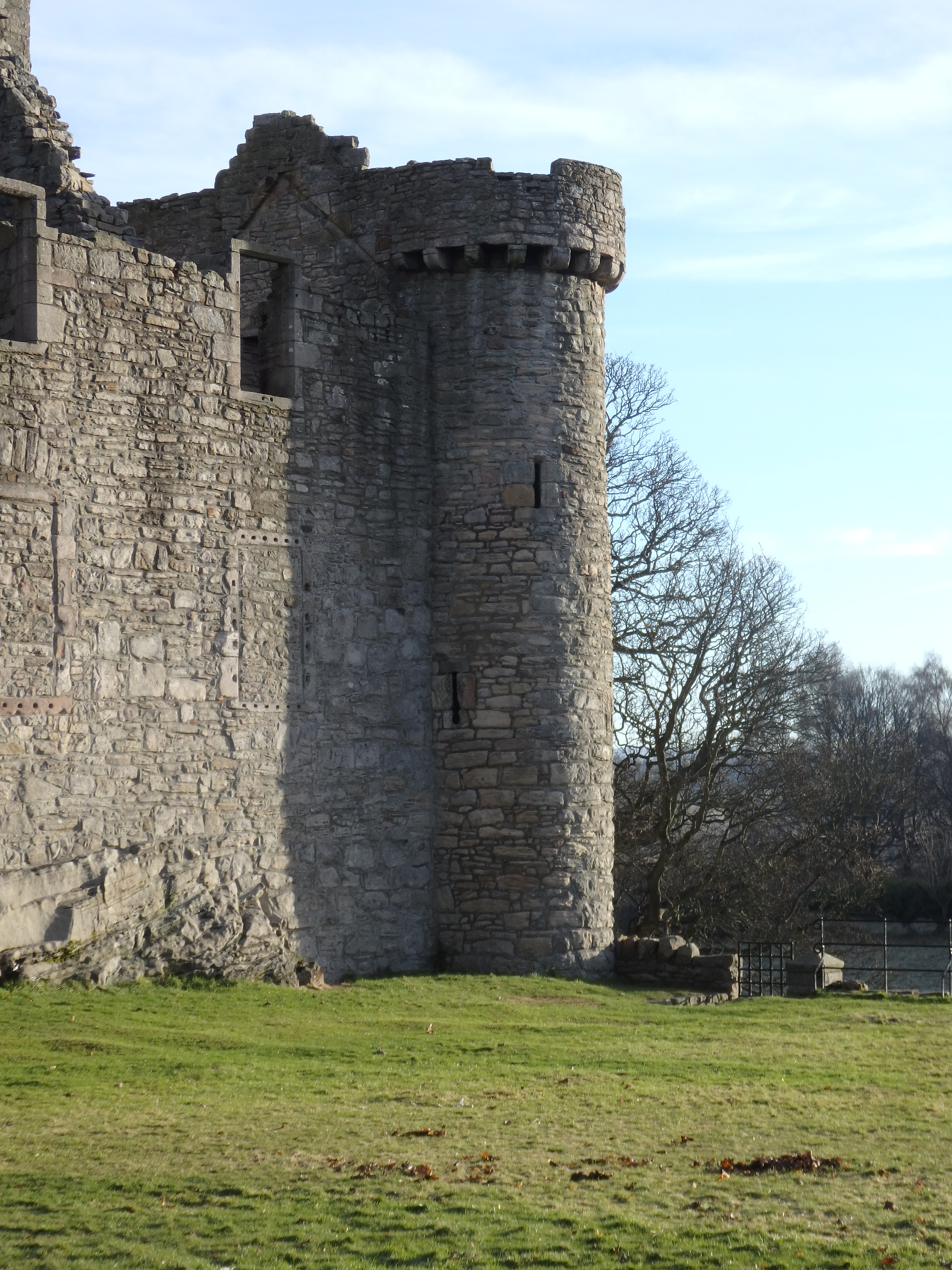
James VI made his decision to sail to Norway at Craigmillar Castle

In September and October 1589 James VI waited for Anne of Denmark at Seton Palace and at Craigmillar Castle. where he decided to sail to Norway after receiving Anne's letters. There are records for preparations and directions for the Queen's arrival from these months made by Edinburgh town and the royal wardrobe. Six velvet saddles and two saddles of "lustered crêpe" were ordered for the queen's entourage, with costumes for two pages and two lackeys.

James VI wrote to his nobles and gentry on 30 August 1589 to send food from their estates for Anne's reception, asking the Laird of Arbuthnott and Sir Patrick Vans of Barnbarroch to provide "fat beef, mutton on foot, wild fowls and venison, to be delivered to Walter Naish Master of the Royal Larder. He also wrote to lairds, including John Gordon of Pitlurg, for hackney riding horses, for himself and the Queen. The Privy Council of Scotland ordered that gunpowder should be reserved and not sold or exported, but be collected for use during the celebrations, in fireworks and cannon salutes.

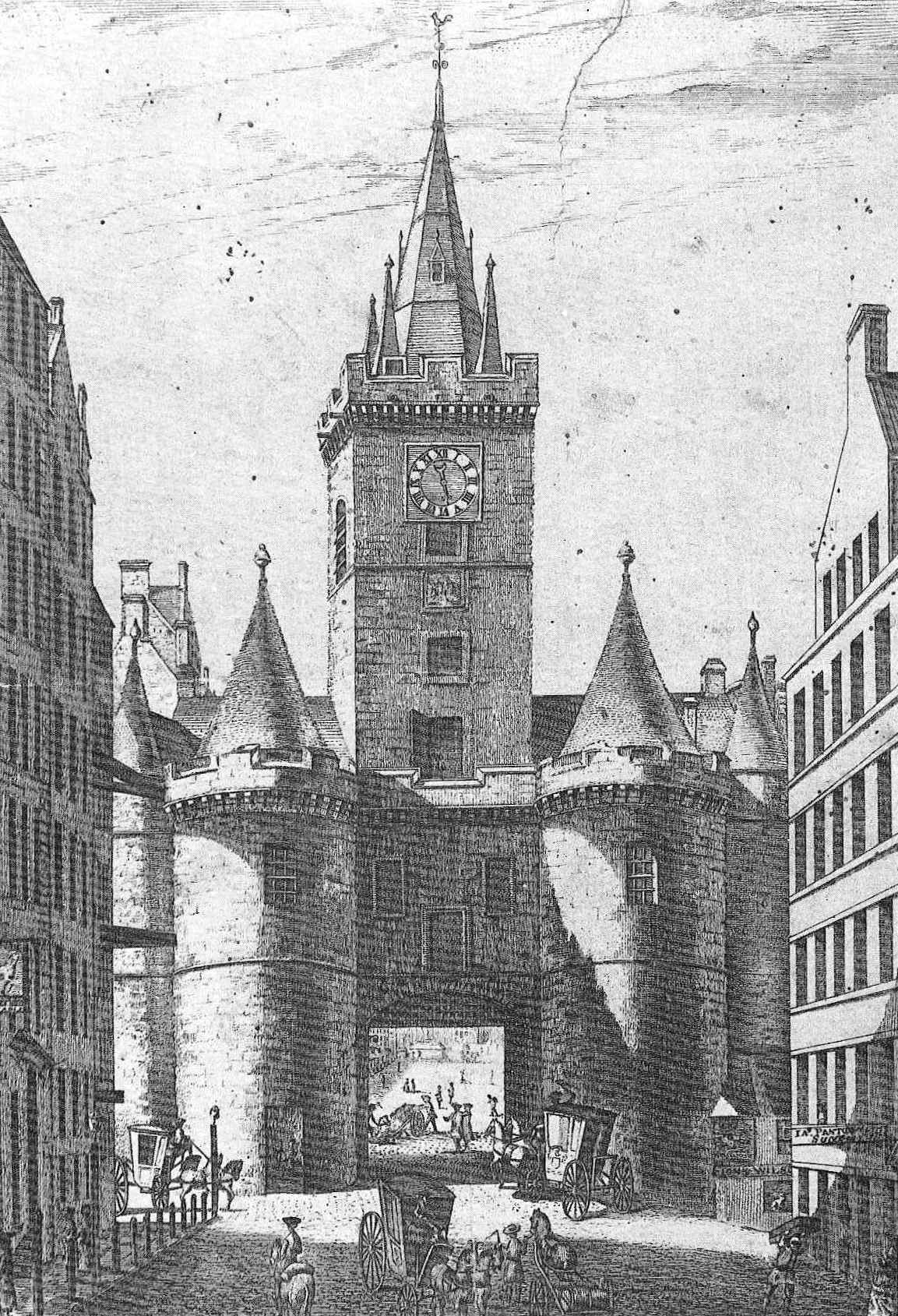
The Netherbow or East Port gate of Edinburgh

The town council repaired the East Port or Netherbow, the gate on the Royal Mile that leads to Holyroodhouse. The stonework was harled with lime by specialists called "spargeonars". The painter, James Workman, refreshed and gilded the carved stone coats of arms. He painted the harled surface of the building's façade around the arms as imitation marble, and painted imitation stonework "ashlar lines" in the arched carriage way or pend. His brother John Workman painted props and costumes, and timber scaffold platforms were built for the pageants. Townspeople were requested to deliver their best table linen to Francis Galbraith, the King's pantry man, for the use of the Danish visitors. William Fairlie was to organise the making of a velvet canopy for the Queen, and a presentation Bible and psalm book.

Similar royal entries had been provided for James VI in October 1579 when he left his childhood household at Stirling Castle, and for Mary, Queen of Scots, who returned from France in 1561. At Mary's entry the stages and "triumphs" throughout the town were built by the carpenter Patrick Schang and painted by Walter Binning. Town officials wore black velvet cloaks and crimson doublets, as did 12 men appointed to carry the queen's canopy, and young townsmen in taffeta costumes accompanied the "convoy" of the triumphal cart.

Queen Elizabeth I planned a masque for her ambassador to present at Anne of Denmark's arrival. The masque would have comprised: six dancers wearing swords or falchions with helmets dressed with feather plumes, presumably representing classical warriors; six masked torch bearers with hats with feathers, their costumes party-coloured in the Stewart colours red and yellow; four speaking parts wearing wigs and flower chaplets. Only the account for making the costumes is known, and the subject of the masque was not recorded.

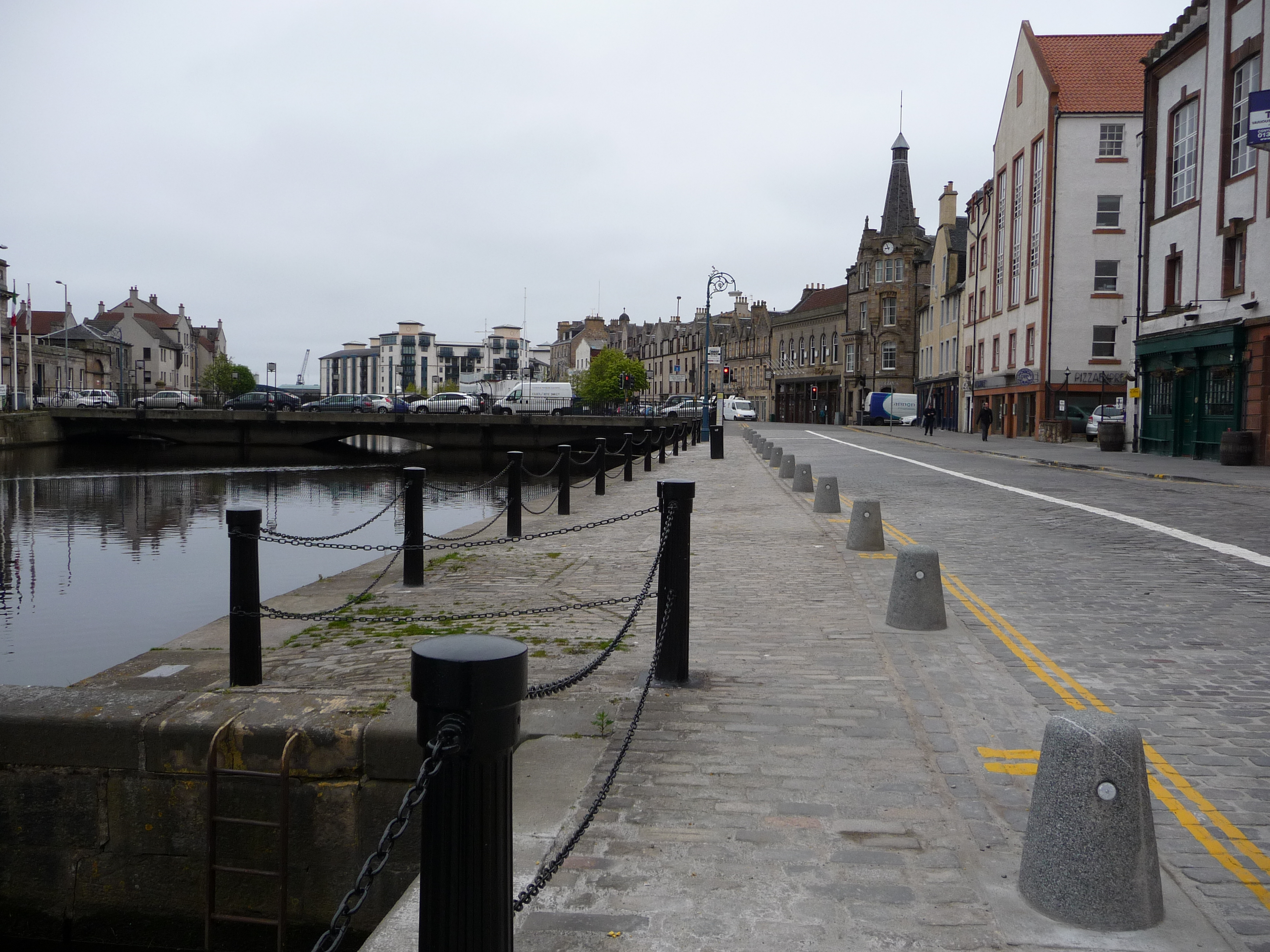
A wooden passage and stair was built from the Shore of Leith to the Queen's Lodging

On 15 September the resident ambassador in Edinburgh William Ashby mentioned the "great preparation" in Leith to receive the queen. This included a covered walkway called a "trance" from the quayside steps to the King's Wark where there was a temporary wooden stair, platform, and entry into the Queen's Lodging on the first floor. These structures and the pathway would be covered with Turkish carpets and tapestry. At this time the scaffolding was usually secured in old barrels filled with sand. Old barrels were also used to form washing tubs for linen cloths and clothes. Ammunition for cannon salutes at the Queen's arrival was brought to Leith from Stirling Castle and Tantallon Castle by Archibald Gardiner and John Chisholm.

The ceremony of the welcoming speeches and the King's response in the Queen's Hall was planned in detail. Francis Stewart, 5th Earl of Bothwell, Lord Seton, and Sir Robert Melville were to board her ship with Peter Young to make a speech of welcome in Latin. On the Shore of Leith she would be met by the Countess of Mar, with Lady Seton, Lady Boyne, Lady Thirlestane, and Lady Dudhope. James Elphinstone would make a speech on the scaffold at the King's Wark. After the King left Anne in the lodging and went to give thanks for his return in South Leith Parish Church the stair would be dismantled. The plan was for Anne to stay in the lodging at Leith for 12 days until the "solemnity" of her entry and coronation.

On 22 September 1589 John Colville brought a magnificent cupboard of silver from England to banquet the Queen. The silver plate and silks, and other goods to the value of £2,000 sterling were supplied by the London goldsmith Richard Martin and the mercer William Stone. The silver service seems to have been received by John Maitland of Thirlestane and taken to Denmark where King James distributed gifts as rewards to the nobles he met in Denmark and Norway.

William Ashby tried with the Border Wardens to coordinate gifts of food sent from the northern counties of England. Henry Stanley, 4th Earl of Derby sent "a brace of fat stags baked in the English fashion". Clothes and textiles for the wedding for James were bought in London by John Colville and "certain merchants of Edinburgh". James VI sent Roger Aston to Lord Scrope at Carlisle for actors to perform in Edinburgh from the Queen's Players, Lord Essex's Players, or possibly Lord Dudley's players, who were at Knowsley Hall the home of Lord Stanley. These players may have performed for the Earl of Bothwell after James VI had sailed for Norway.

== A queen delayed by contrary winds ==
Anne of Denmark sailed on 5 September 1589 with Peder Munk and Henrik Knudsen Gyldenstierne, admiral of the fleet, and 18 ships. The Danish fleet included the Gideon, Josaphad or Josafat their flagship, Samson, Joshua, Dragon, Raphael, St Michael, Gabriel, Little Sertoun (Lille Fortuna), Mouse, Rose, the Falcon of Birren, the Blue Lion, the Blue Dove (Blaa Due) and the White Dove (Hvide Due). The Gideon began to leak, and Peder Munk told Anne that the hold was filling with water despite the prayers and requests of the learned academics and diplomats Paul Knibbe and Niels Krag. Two ships, the Parrot and the Fighting Cock were scattered from the fleet.

Lord Dingwall's ship arrived at Stonehaven with the news of the storm and the fear that the Queen was in danger in the seas. While waiting for his bride at Seton Palace and Craigmillar Castle, James VI may have begun a series of love poems in Scots now known as the Amatoria. He decided to go to Norway himself after he received letters from Anna of Denmark saying she had been delayed from setting out and would not try again. On 3 October, Anne wrote to James, in French;

we have already put out to sea four or five times but have always been driven back to the harbours from which we sailed, thanks to contrary winds and other problems that arose at sea, which is the cause why, now Winter is hastening down on us, and fearing greater danger, all this company is forced to our regret, and to the regret and high displeasure of your men, to make no further attempt at present, but to defer the voyage until the Spring.

Anne's mother Sophie of Mecklenburg-Güstrow and her brother Christian IV sent similar letters. James VI had already made his decision. On account of the "sundrie contrarious windis" that delayed the Danish fleet, on 11 October James VI asked East coast mariners and ship masters to come to Leith. James VI sailed with six ships hired from owners including Robert Jameson. Patrick Vans of Barnbarroch hired the Falcon of Leith from John Gibson. The King's sailing was delayed by a storm until the evening of 22 October. Finally, he embarked and sailed to Flekkerøy near Oslo, encountering a storm on the way. He landed on 3 November and slept in the same farmhouse on the island as Anne had.

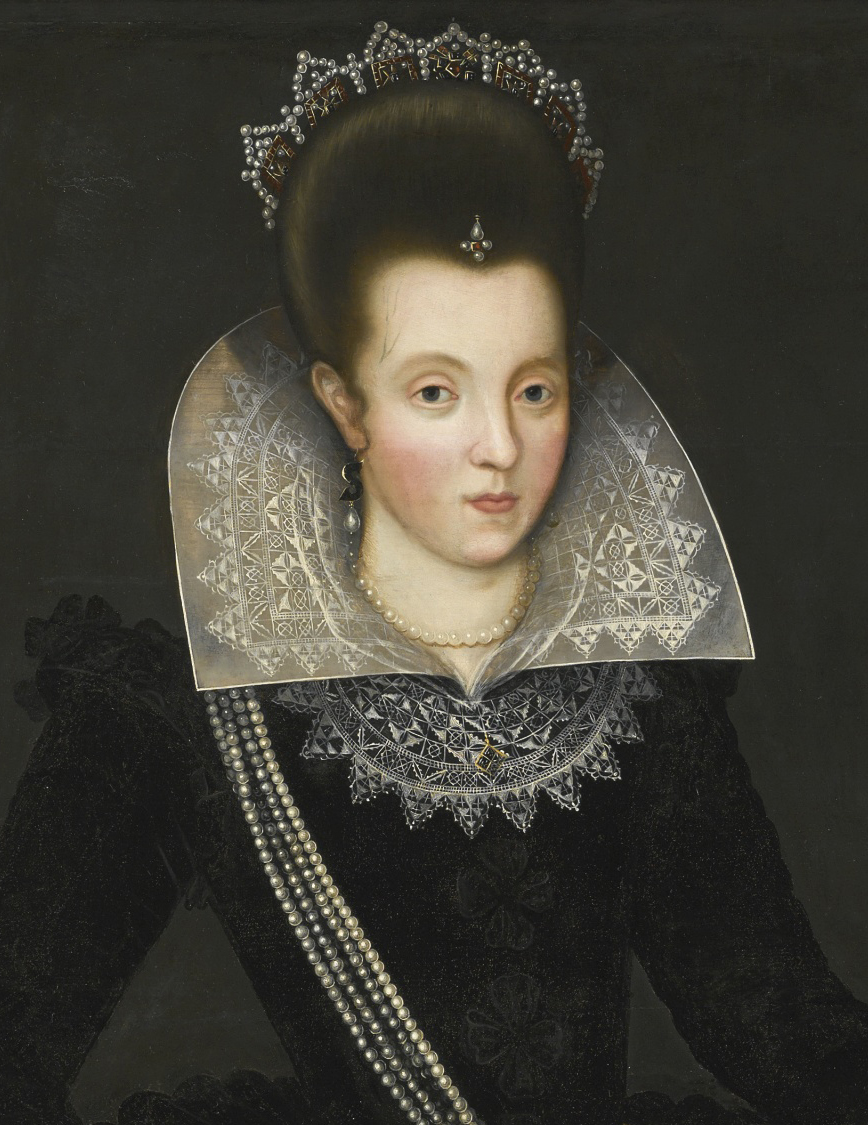
The King and Queen of Scots attended the wedding of Elisabeth of Denmark

James VI met his queen at Oslo, and married her at the Old Bishop's Palace in Oslo on 23 November 1589, the residence of the Mayor, Christen Mule. He wore red and blue outfits embroidered with gold stars. After some correspondence with his mother-in-law, Sophie of Mecklenburg, they travelled to Varberg and crossed from Helsingborg to Elsinore, or Helsingør, in Denmark to join the Danish royal court. James made "gude cheir and drank stoutlie till the springtyme". The King played cards and a dice game called "Mumchance" to pass the time. They attended the marriage of Elisabeth of Denmark and Henry Julius, Duke of Brunswick-Lüneburg on 19 April 1590. James VI later worked his experiences of the voyage and winter weather, and desire for his bride, into several sonnets.

The storms were blamed on witchcraft, a sentiment echoed in international correspondence. One of the women accused at the North Berwick Witch Trials, Agnes Sampson, in her confession used the phrase "contrary wind" in a special sense. She said that the King's ship experienced "a contrary wind to the rest of ships, then being in his company, which thing was most strange and true, as the King's Majesty acknowledges, for when the rest of the ships had a fair and good wind, then was the wind contrary and altogether against his Majesty". This seems to be an incident described in the chronicle by David Moysie. When James VI set sail for Norway his ship was driven back to St Monans in Fife.

The use of the phrase "contrary winds" was not particular to the sea voyages of Anne of Denmark and James VI. His great grandmother Margaret Tudor had written to Henry VIII in 1540 that James V had "been in great danger of seas by contrary winds, which, against his mind, by extreme storms, compelled to make course forth of this east sea northward, compassing the most part of this realm through the occident seas, and by the grace of God arrived in the port of Saint Ninian called Whithorn". The idea that James VI and Anna of Denmark were in peril at sea by a "conspiracy of witches" appeared in the masque at the baptism of Prince Henry in 1594, when their good fortune was depicted by a ship in the Great Hall of Stirling Castle.

== Preparations for the return ==
James VI sent instructions for his welcome with the master of work William Schaw, who was to repair the Palace of Holyroodhouse. Schaw received £1000 to spend on the palace from taxes raised in Edinburgh.

He also gave orders for five ships to be provided for the return voyage to Scotland. The ships were to be decorated with ensigns, flags, war-streamers of red taffeta, red side cloths, and decked tops with colours of red and yellow, ready to depart from the Firth by the 1 April 1590. An account for the expenses of the James Royall of Ayr reveals that the flags and side cloths cost over £500.

James VI sent a list of who should form the welcoming party at Leith, and the food and drink required to entertain his Danish guests. On 19 February 1590, James VI wrote from Kronborg to his Privy Council, urging them to keep good order in Scotland and forward the preparations, for his "comming hame, God willing, draws neire ... a King of Scotland with a newe married Wife will not come hame every daye ... respect not onely my Honor in this, but the Honor of our wholle Nation ... in any thing respect my Honor ... and specially since I have seen so gude an example in this Countrie ... Faile not to provide gude Cheare for us, for we have heir aboundance of gude Meit and part of Drinck".

Schaw sailed from Copenhagen on a ship hired from James Gourlay. Saddles and mantles were to be provided for riders in the procession from Leith to Holyroodhouse. James VI sent orders that John Carmichael should raise a company of 200 soldiers to attend his landing, and restrain those trying to meet him at Leith, including "nobility and ladies". This was disappointing news which led to fears that the "order used in Denmark", where noble titles were not used, might prejudice their ancient rights. Carmichael's instructions for the welcome also requested fireworks and the Flemish sugarman, Jacques de Bousie, was to prepare confections and sweetmeats for banquets at the landing. The Countess of Mar and Lady Thirlestane were to organise a welcoming party of noble ladies and young gentlewomen.

== Arrival at Leith ==
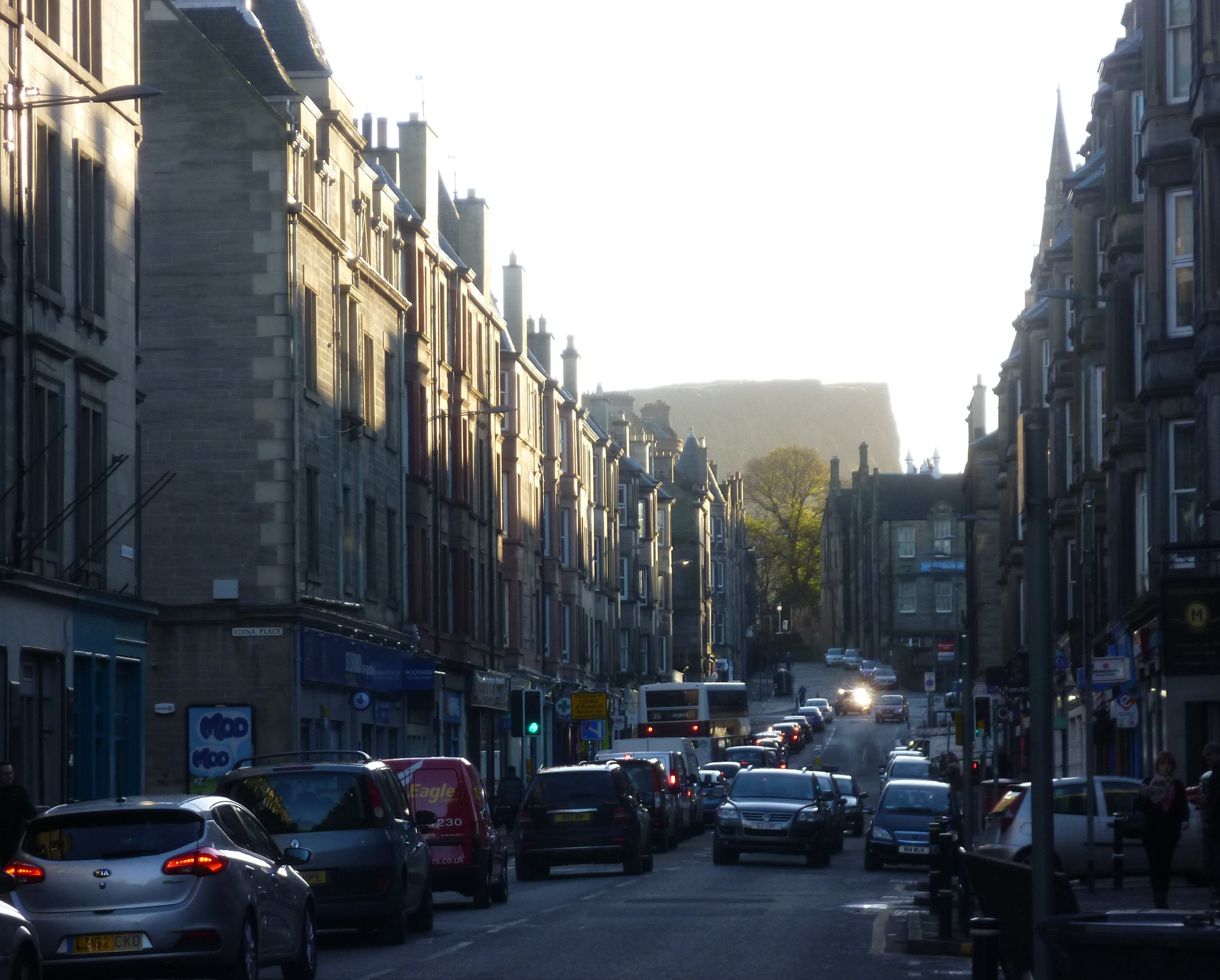
Anne of Denmark travelled in her silver coach from Leith to Holyrood Palace

Anne of Denmark and James VI arrived at Leith on 1 May 1590. James VI presented the skipper of Admiral Munk's ship, the pilots, and the trumpeters, violers and kettle drummers at the Shore with forty gold rose noble coins, accounted from his dowry. Anna of Denmark was welcomed by speeches to her lodging on the first floor of the King's Wark, where she stayed for five days. A speech of welcome was made by James Elphinstone. A bonfire was lit that night on the Salisbury Crags of Arthur's Seat fuelled with ten loads of coal and six barrels of tar.

They left Leith for Edinburgh on 6 May 1590, travelling in procession up Easter Road. The King led, riding with his earls, the Queen riding behind in a coach shipped from Denmark, accompanied by the three Scottish earls chosen as companions to the Danish envoys. Edinburgh town had made plans for a bonfire on the side of Calton Hill for this procession. Above all, the Danish coach drew the onlooker's attention, "richly apparelled with cloth of gold and purple velvet", and said to be all silver with "no iron in it."

There was to be a coronation at Holyrood Abbey and a ceremony of "Entry" into the town of Edinburgh. The dates of these events were swapped to avoid festivities on a Sunday.

The Danish ambassadors requested permission to use the time before the coronation to view and take sasine of the lands and palaces given to Anne of Denmark by James VI as a "morning gift". Peder Munk and the lawyer John Skene made this journey between 11 and 14 May. Their first stop in Fife was Wemyss Castle. They visited Falkland Palace, Linlithgow Palace and Dunfermline Palace. The English ambassador Robert Bowes heard the Danish commission was dissatisfied with the value of the lands and the state of the buildings, and they insisted the Queen should have as good a settlement as that given by James IV to Margaret Tudor in 1503.

== The Coronation ==
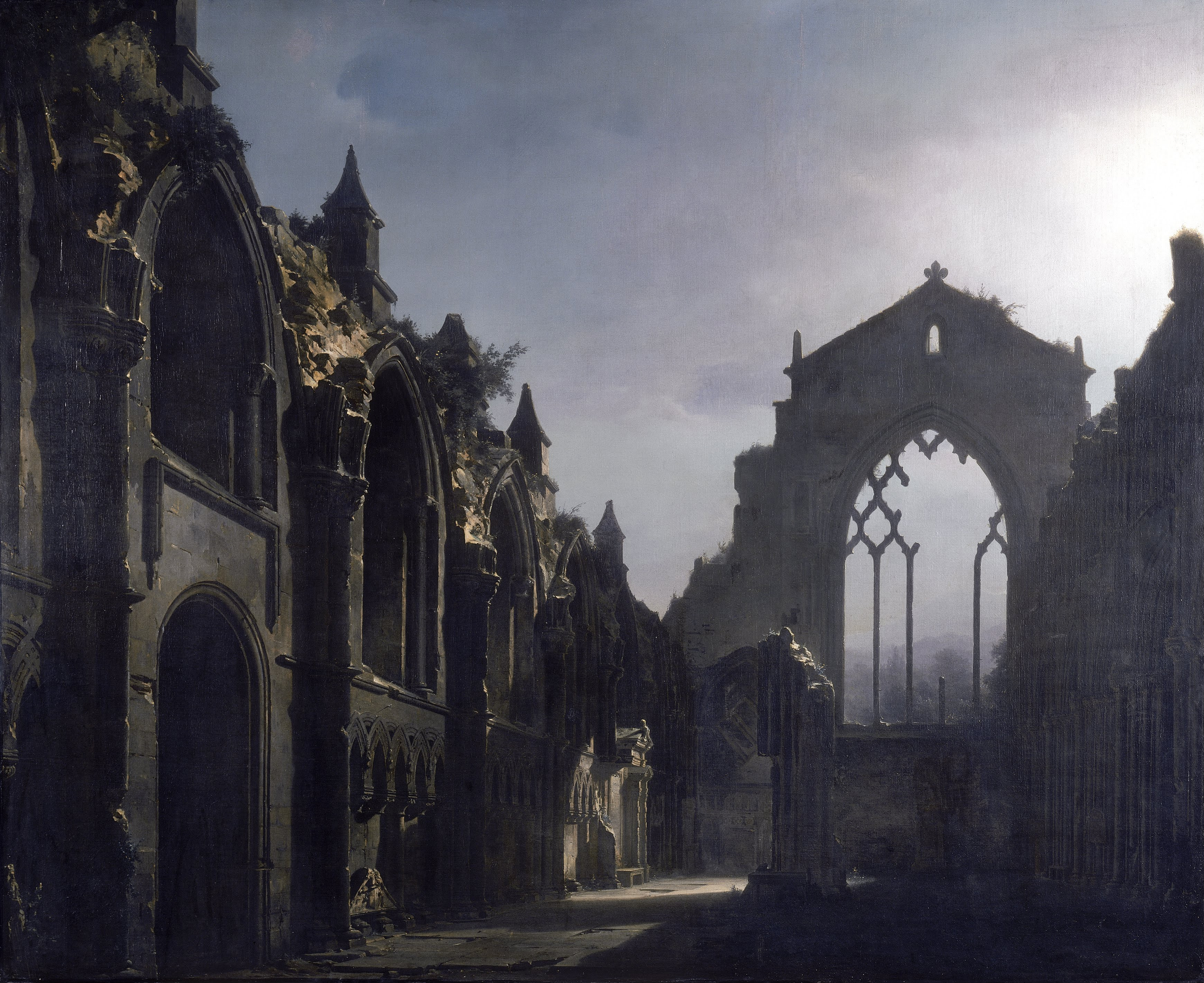
Anne was crowned in Holyrood Abbey, (Louis Daguerre)

The Coronation took place on Sunday 17 May 1590 in Holyrood Abbey. Fifteen men were knighted before the ceremony including; James Douglas of Drumlanrig, Robert Ker of Cessford, Walter Scott of Buccleuch, Robert Gordon of Lochinvar, John Cockburn of Ormiston, Thomas Kennedy of Culzean, and Duncan Campbell of Glenorchy. Robert Bruce was the minister. William Douglas, 10th Earl of Angus carried the sword of state into the church, Lord Hamilton the sceptre, and the Duke of Lennox carried the crown.

James VI entered the church with five earls walking behind holding the tails of his purple cloak. John Maitland, newly made Lord Crichton followed with the queen's crown. Anna was next, with the English ambassador Robert Bowes at her right hand, and the Danish admiral Peder Munk at her left. Bowes's wife, and three Scottish countesses held the Queen's train; Annabell Murray, Countess of Mar, Margaret Douglas, Countess of Bothwell and Jean Kennedy, Countess of Orkney. Behind them walked Jean Fleming, Lady Chancellor, Margaret Livingstone, Lady Justice Clerk, and other women. The maidens of honour followed, including Cathrina Skinkel and Anna Kaas. When the congregation was settled in their places, Psalm 40 and Psalm 48 were sung, and there was a sermon.

According to a version of David Moysie's Memoir, Patrick Galloway gave the sermon. Robert Bruce made a speech declaring that he had heard Anne of Denmark's oath and he asked the people to raise their hands to acknowledge their obedience to her. A Danish account mentions that Bruce gave a short speech explaining that the anointing and other rituals were civil matters and not eccelesiatical.

Annabell Murray, Countess of Mar adjusted the Queen's clothing to expose her shoulder and upper right arm, and Robert Bruce anointed her with oil. Some ministers of the Scottish kirk considered the anointing of the Queen to be idolatrous. The Queen then changed out off her clothes into royal robes in a curtained-off enclosure or tent in the church, assisted by Cathrina Skinkel and Anna Kaas. The robe was made of purple velvet lined with white Spanish taffeta, fastened with one great gold button, with a purple velvet stomacher tied with white ribbon. There was a band of gold passements around the gown and a narrower band at the neck, and a fur trim or fur lapels.

Thus transformed, she returned to her seat and Robert Bruce placed the crown on her head. James passed the sceptre to Bruce who gave it to the Queen. Bruce acknowledged her as "our most gracious lady and queen of Scotland" in Scots, and David Lindsay, the minister who had married them, repeated the speech in French, which she knew better. She read out her oath, to support God's work, justice, and the church. Bruce called on the congregation to pray that the Queen would work to achieve as she had made her oath. Then the cry went up, "May Our Lord and God protect and keep the queen", and the Queen moved to a throne placed higher on the stage between the Duke of Lennox and Lord Hamilton. Andrew Melville recited his Latin poem, the Stephaniskion; Bruce spoke on the great benefits the marriage had brought, and asked the people to pay homage. John Cockburn of Ormiston kneeled and with raised hands made an oath on behalf of the ordinary people of Scotland to serve the Queen.

=== A crown of Scotland for the queen ===
The queen's crown was described in three later inventories of royal jewels. It was an imperial crown with arches surmounted by a ball set with pearls and a cross with diamonds, pearls, and a ruby. The main stones of the circlet were a large sapphire and a diamond, a ruby, with 24 pearls. The crown was fitted with a purple velvet bonnet lined with crimson satin. This may have been a crown made from Scottish gold for Mary of Guise, the mother of Mary, Queen of Scots, in October 1539 by the Edinburgh goldsmith John Mosman.

A crown, its gold weighing 25 ounces, in the Tower of London in 1649, was described as a "small crown found in an iron chest, formerly in the Lord Cottington's charge". This was probably the crown made by Everard Everdyes for the coronation of Edward VI rather than a Scottish crown.

== Entry to Edinburgh ==
=== West Port ===
The "Entry" took place on Tuesday 19 May 1590. The Queen entered the town at the West Port, a gate to the west part of Edinburgh, west of the Grassmarket. A lawyer, John Russell, gave a speech in Latin. The town gate was decorated with tapestry and above the roadway there was a platform for musicians. A globe was lowered to the queen's coach; it opened to reveal a boy (Russel's son) dressed in red velvet with a white taffeta cloak. He gave the queen a Bible, a key to the city, and a jewel, while reciting a verse. The globe, which had been borrowed from Dundee, closed up and was winched up again. The boy represented "Edina", the female embodiment of Edinburgh. The Bible was bought from Nicoll Uddart, bound in gilt Morocco leather, and presented in a pocket made of purple velvet supplied by Robert Jousie. Two symbolic silver keys were made by an Edinburgh goldsmith, John Cunningham.

=== The Convoy of the Moors ===
As part of the ceremony, when Anne of Denmark was in the town, fifty people walked in front of her coach, to make way through the crowds. Some wore masks of the colour of the base metals: lead, copper, or iron. Some had blackened their faces and arms, others had masks, black sleeves, and gloves, and they wore black ankle boots with white buskins or leggings on their calves. These were young men from Edinburgh representing African people, described at the time as "Moors". The leader of this group was an African man holding a sword, while his followers had long white staffs to make room. Some wore costumes like sailors' tunics of white taffeta or silver cloth, and gold necklaces, and wore gold links set with precious stones at their noses and ears or mouths. They wore short trousers and had blackened their legs to the thigh. The painting and make-up cost 42 shillings. Their performance included walking stiffly, or half in dance, with high steps like a stork in water, staggering as if drunk, or crouching forwards as they passed.

The poet John Burell described the variety of precious stones worn by the "Moirs" in nineteen stanzas of verse. According to Burrell, these men represented the "Moirs" of "the Inds" who lived in comparative ease and comfort by the golden mountain of "SYNERDAS" and came to honour the queen in Edinburgh, unlike the followers of Faunus who scratched a living in the wilderness;

"Into the seruice of our Queene,
Thay offert thair maist willing mynds,
Thir are the MOIRS, of quhom I mene,
Quha dois inhabit in the ynds:
Leving thair land and dwelling place,
For to do honour to hir Grace.

Thay have na scant, nor indigence,
Quhair thay do dwell, and have exces,
Nor yit thay have na residence,
With PHAUNUS, God of wildernes:
Bot thay do dwell, quhair thay were wont,
Beside SYNERDAS goldin mont."

Mary, Queen of Scots had been accompanied by the same performance during her Entry to Edinburgh in September 1561, and their costumes then were made from white taffeta. They were called the "convoy". At Mary's wedding to Lord Darnley in 1565, a similar offer of service to the Queen was made by actors representing Ethiopian and Libyan people, who offered their hands and minds.

An African man described as "ane Moir" was a member of Anne of Denmark's household in October 1590 and was bought clothes with the Queen's pages, although it not known if this was the same person as the leader of the "moors" at the Entry. Jemma Field and other scholars including Miranda Kaufmann propose that the same man was the performer in both events and was also the man recorded as the member of the Queen's household. The African servant in the Queen's household is not recorded in later years and may have died in July 1591. In 1594 an African actor took part in the masque at the baptism of Prince Henry, and he may have been the performer at the 1590 Entry.

=== The Horoscope ===
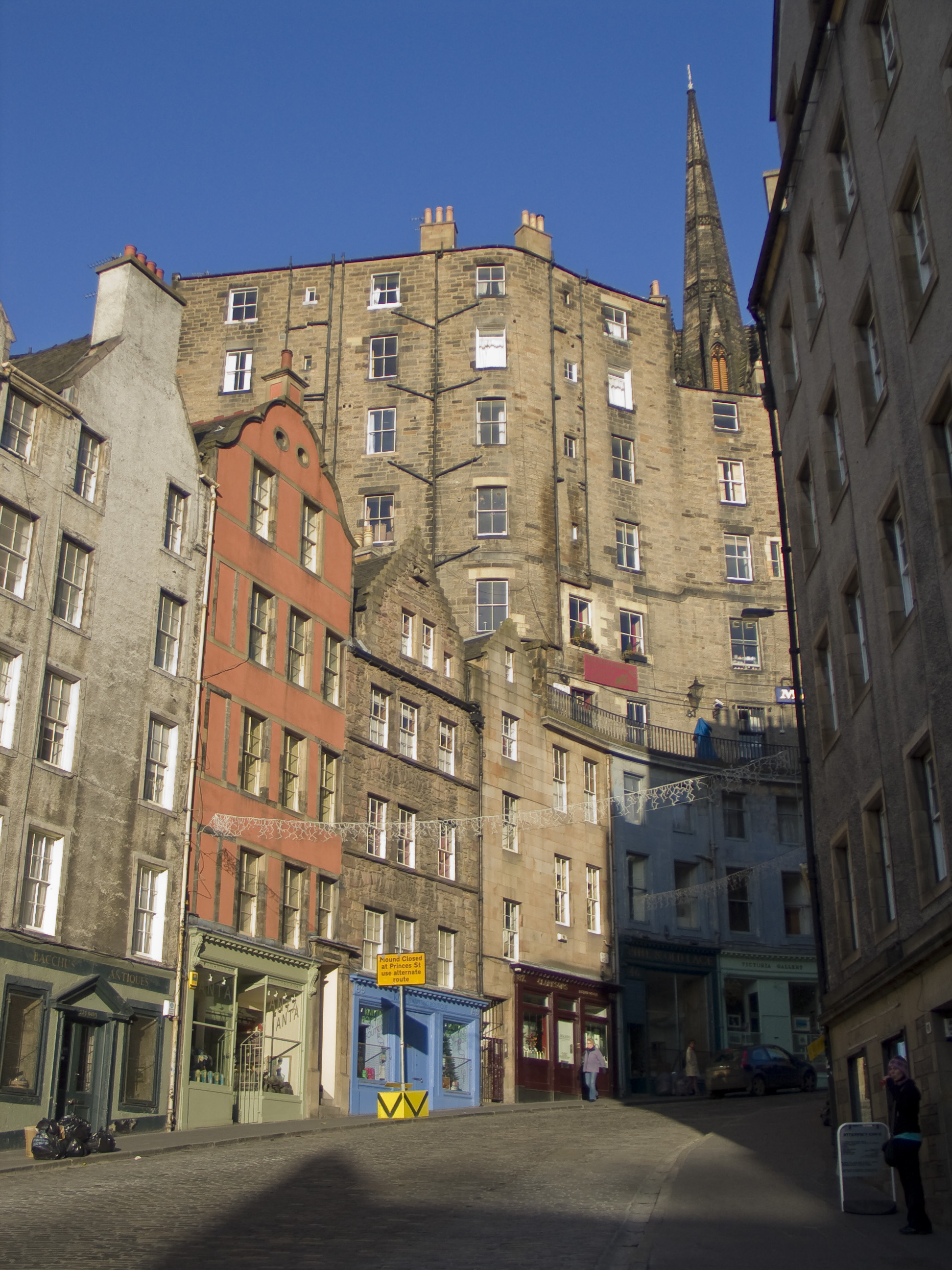
Astronomy greeted Anne of Denmark on West Bow

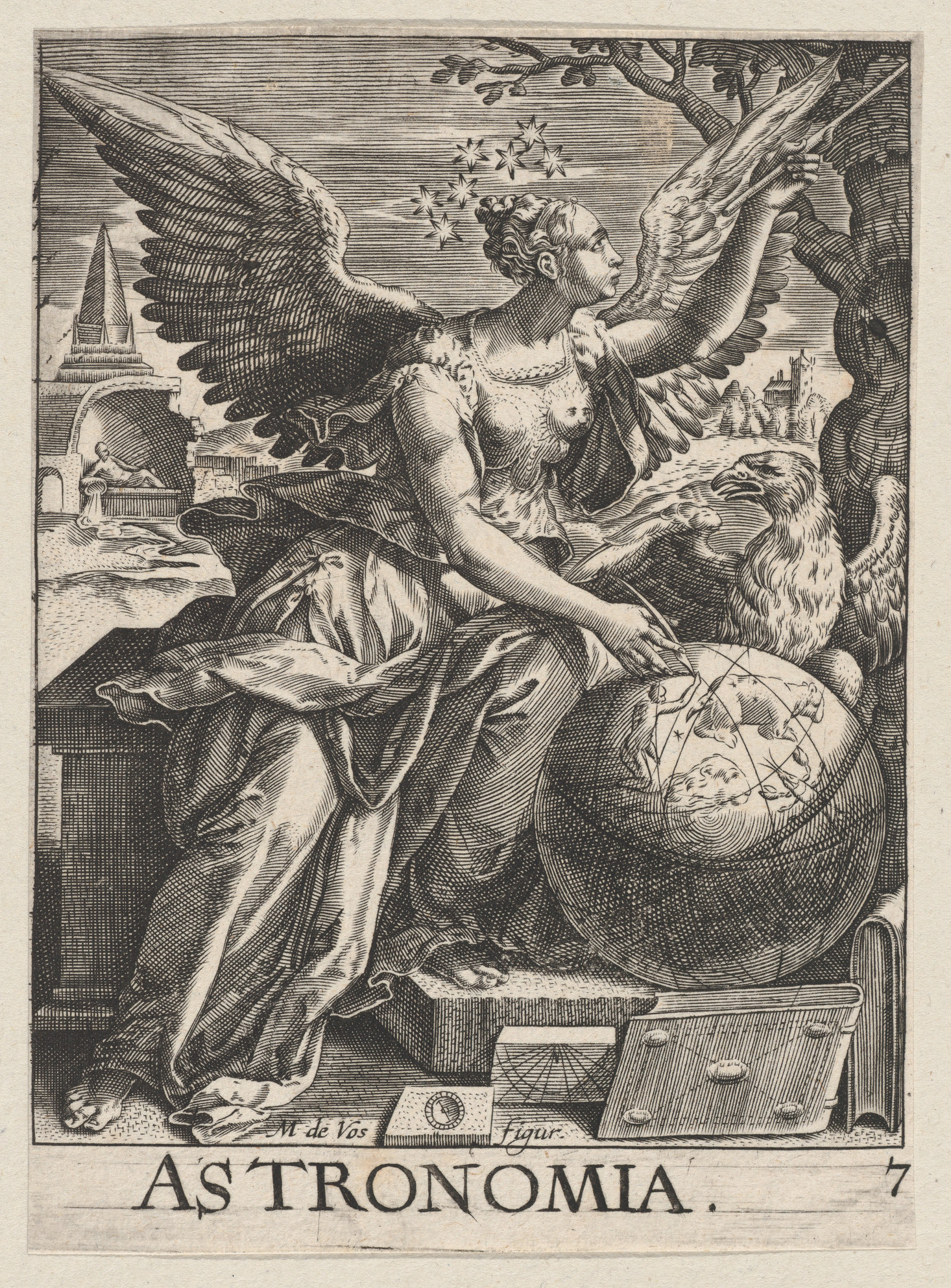
Astronomia predicted with mathematical instruments a hailstorm of white sweets.

Anne progressed in her coach under a canopy called the "paill" up the narrow street from the Grassmarket called the West Bow, where a boy with mathematical instruments played the female personification of Astronomy, "Astronomia" or "Astrologia", reciting Anne's fortune and the children she would bear in Latin verse composed by the schoolmaster Hercules Rollock. The actor predicted a hail storm and white sugar sweets were thrown from the windows of houses overlooking the scene, near Riddle's Court. The child said this rain would fall into her lap, proving the truth of his prediction, alluding to the legend of Danaë. The 12 boxes of sweets, described as "scrotcherts and confects", cost £3-2s–8d Scots. Anna's canopy was carried by six men, three teams were appointed to serve in stages through the streets of Edinburgh. They were mostly merchants, the crafts were represented by the saddler Robert Abercromby.

=== The Muses ===
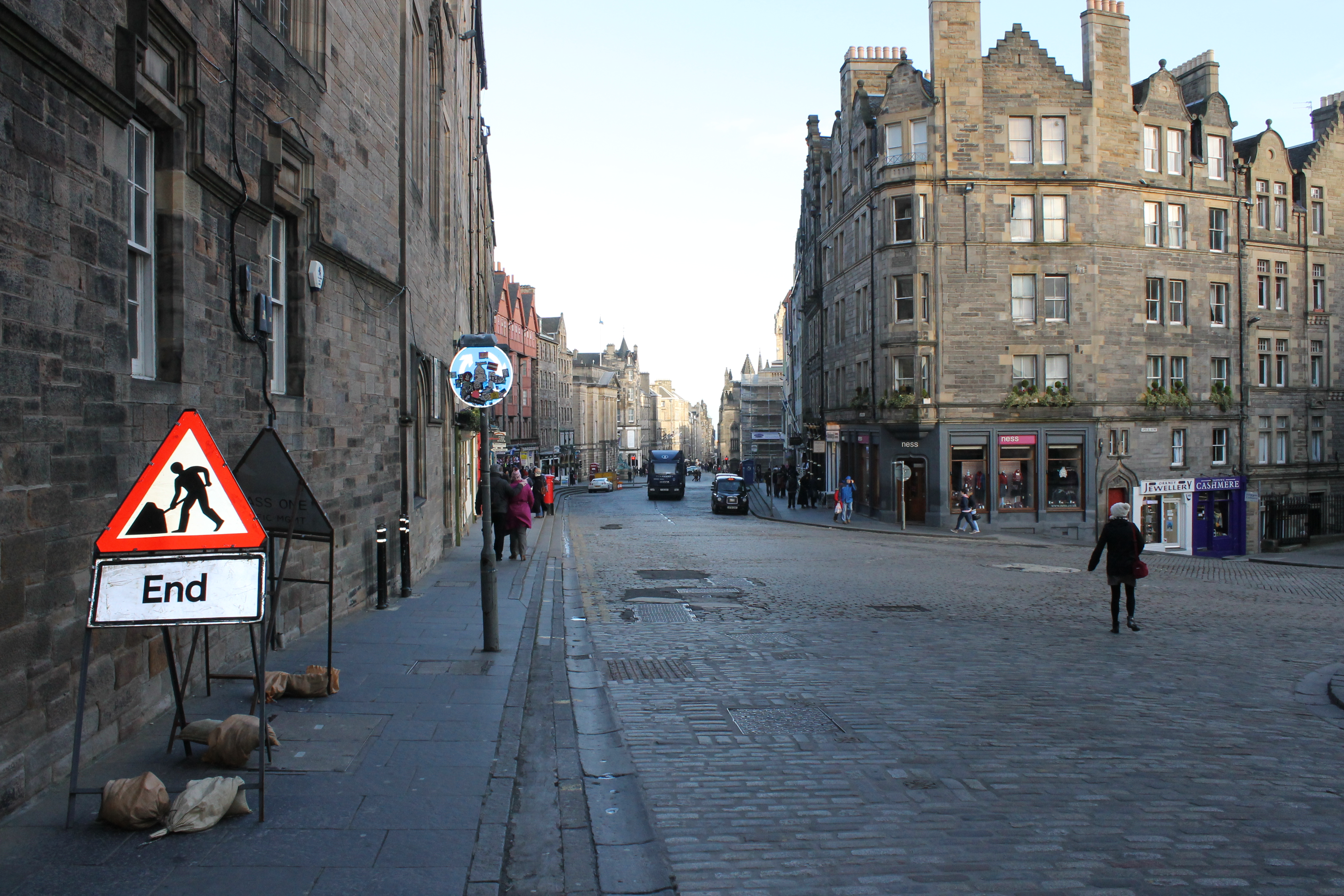
The nine Muses sang for the queen at the top of the West Bow

At the top of the street on the Royal Mile there was a weigh house for butter, called the "Butter Tron". There nine young women from Edinburgh were dressed as the Muses. They had elaborate costumes, and held gilt books. John Burrell described the costume in verse. They curtsied, and sang, but did not speak; instead another schoolboy spoke for them in verse, explaining to Anne that the muses served the king and she would be their refuge and mother.

=== The Virtues ===
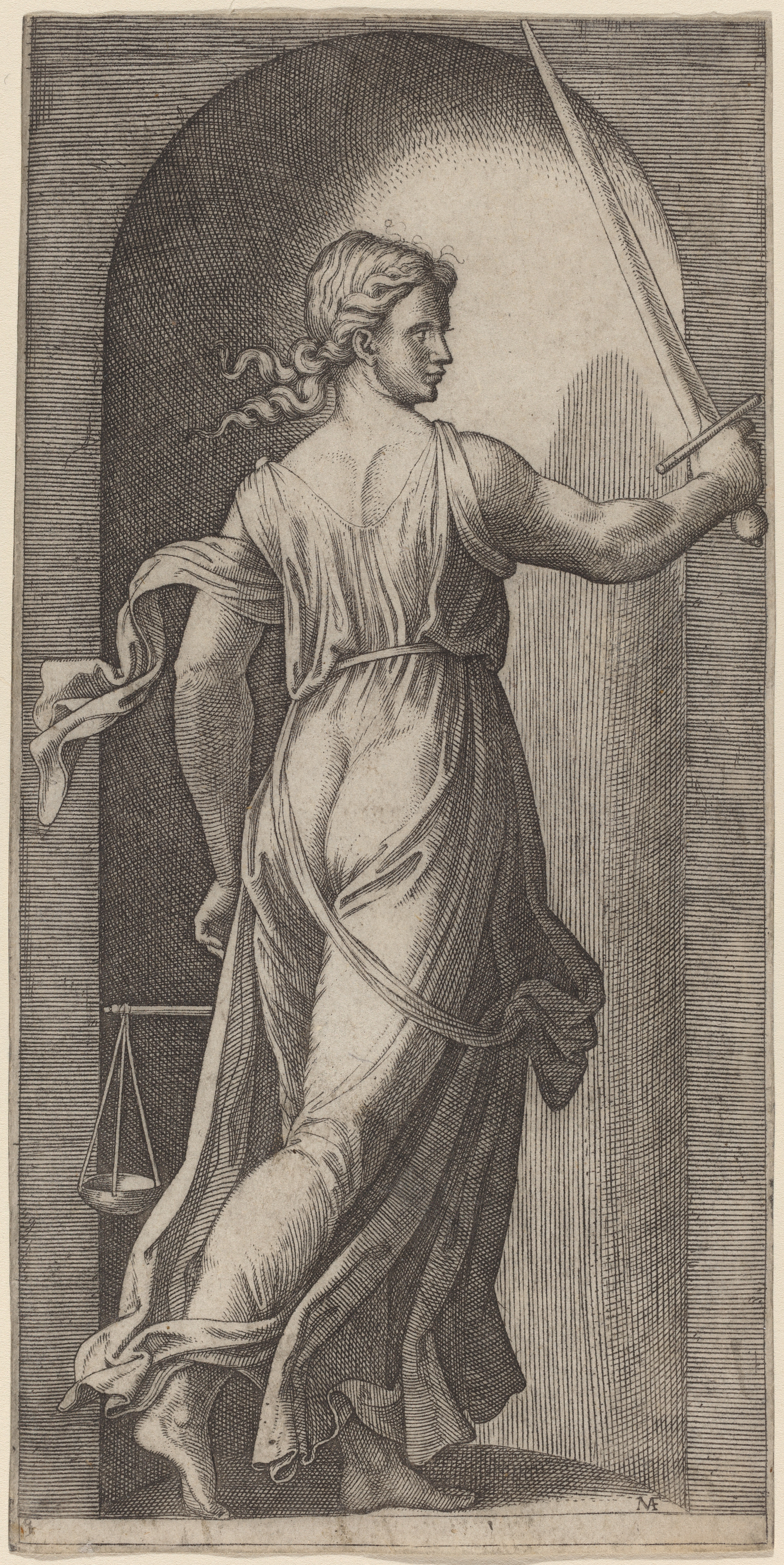
Allegorical figure of Justice with sword and scales, Marcantonio Raimondi

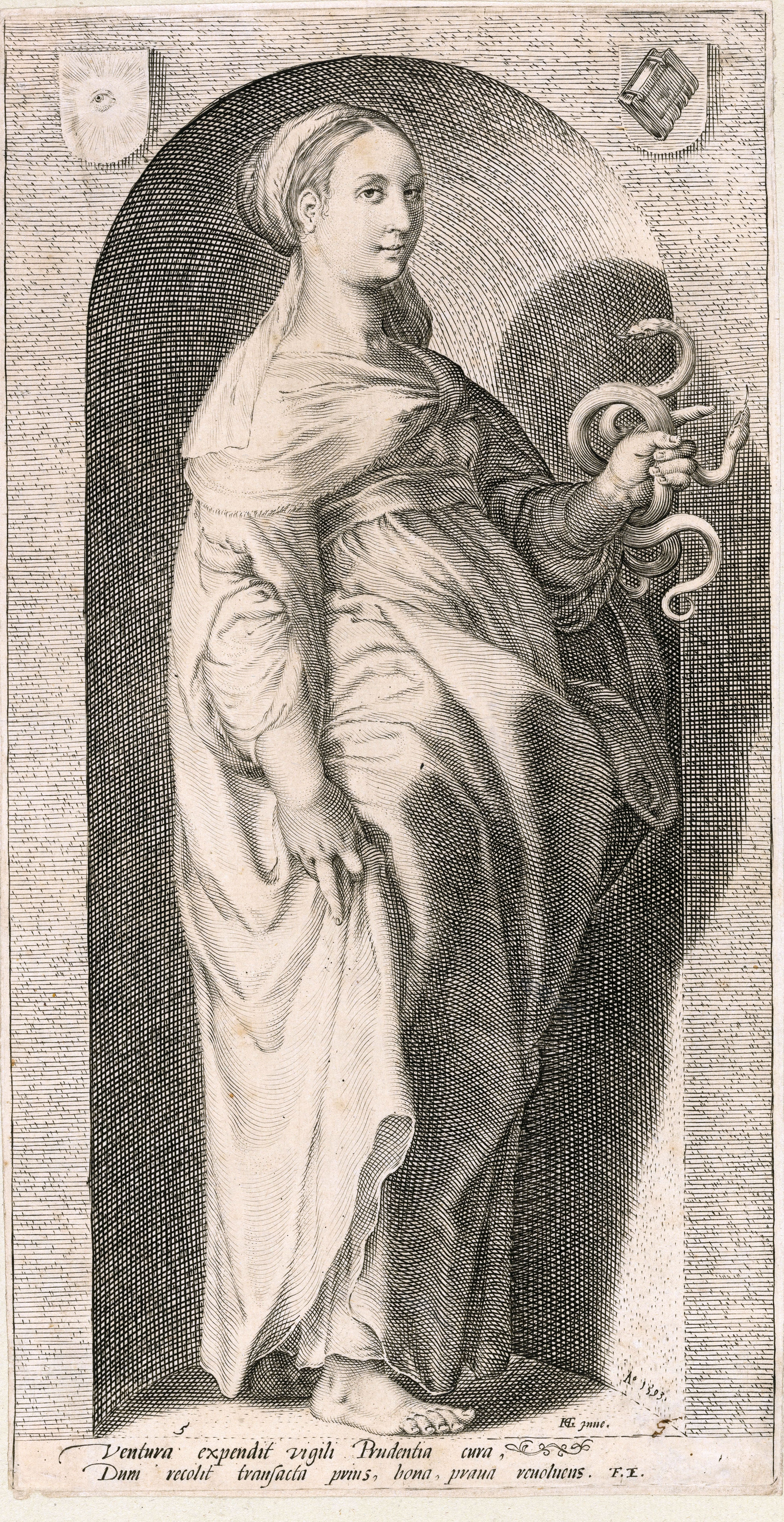
Allegorical figure of Prudence with serpents, a book and an eye for foresight in the two shields, after Hendrik Goltzius

Outside St Giles Kirk there was a large stage, on which stood the mother Virtue or Piety crowned with her four daughters dressed in black silk with chaplets of flowers on their head. Virtue took off her crown and gave it to the queen. Virtue's speech exhorted Anne to welcome her daughters, Prudence, Justice, Fortitude and Temperance into her home where they would watch over her. Each daughter then came forward, Prudence with an astrolabe in her hand, who counselled against the laziness that brings misfortune; Justice, with her sword and scales, explained that strong castles are built on the principle of equity; Fortitude, with the club of Hercules and a shield, advised humility in success and patience in failure to disregard sorrow. Temperance, with her hourglass and bridle, counselled self-control. Mother Virtue concluded that the Word of God was the greatest wealth. Then Psalm 120 was sung.

The five actors were young men dressed as women. Another account of the event says they held the usual traditional attributes, Prudence a serpent and dove, Fortitude a broken pillar, and Temperance a cup of wine. This discrepancy could be resolved by assuming that the performance involved the virtues picking up these alternative objects.

=== Banquet of Bacchus and Ceres ===
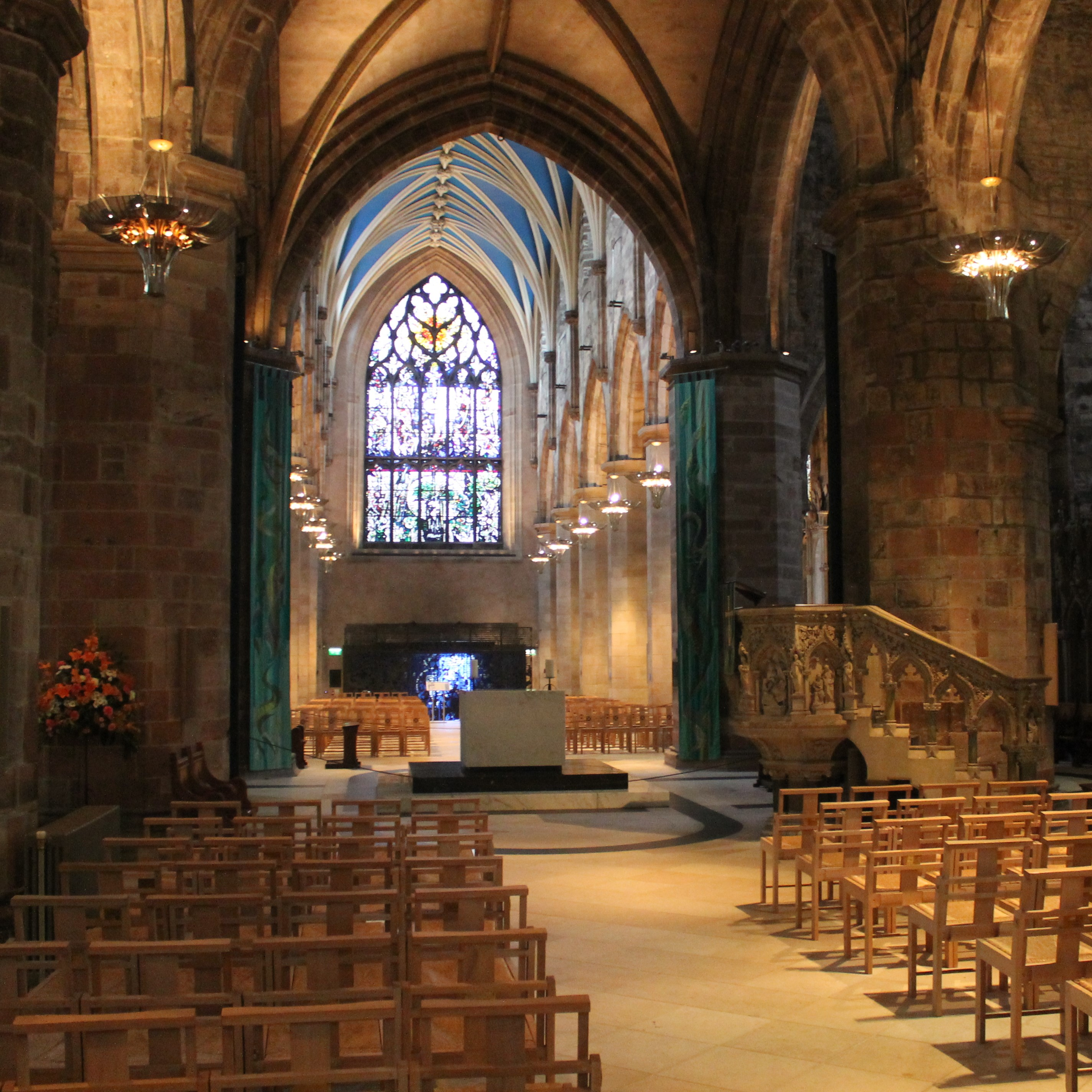
In St Giles, Robert Bruce spoke from Psalm 107 on those 'went down to the sea in ships'

Anne of Denmark got out of her coach and walked into St Giles under the red velvet canopy or "paill" flanked by Peder Munk and Lord Hamilton, while a choir sang Psalm 19. Robert Bruce preached on the subject of Psalm 107, a reflection of thanksgiving for the safe return of mariners; then Psalm 23 was sung. Outside the church, where the Mercat Cross is now situated, the next pageant showed the ancestry of the kings of Denmark and the arms of previous Scottish queen consorts. Nearby were Bacchus and Ceres, played by schoolboys, offering a banquet referring to the abundance of the lands of the queen's "morning gift". A big older actor, who had been seated on a wine barrel, got up and threw food gifts into the crowd of spectators.

=== The Family Tree ===
At the place where salt was weighed, the "Salt Tron", where the Tron Kirk is now, an artificial tree had five stages or branches with boys representing kings and queens with the arms of the monarchs of Denmark and Scotland. At the base of the tree a king in armour resting on a couch was Christian I of Denmark, a common ancestor of James VI and Anne, from whom these monarchs descended, as the Biblical kings sprang from Jesse. For Anne's benefit, a boy rehearsed her family tree. The display would have highlighted the marriage of Margaret of Denmark to James III of Scotland in 1469.

=== Solomon and the Queen of Sheba ===
The final pageant of the Entry took place at the East Port or Netherbow, the gate on the Royal Mile to the Canongate that leads to Holyroodhouse. A dialogue between Solomon and the Queen of Sheba was dramatised. The Queen said she had come to Solomon to study his unequalled wisdom. She brought him the balsam that does not grow in Scotland, and thanked him for his company which was like drinking at Pallas Athena's breast. Solomon replied that she should always remain in his respect and honour, and so good-night. Then another schoolboy explained to Anne of Denmark that as the Queen of Sheba had desired to meet Solomon, so James had travelled to meet her, and now all Scotland would serve her. He gave Anne of Denmark the town's gift of a jewel, which was lowered from the Netherbow with a length of silk ribbon.

Anne returned down the Canongate to Holyroodhouse, according to John Burrell, still accompanied by the 40 or 50 young men in costume as "moors". Adrian Damman explains that at Holyrood they tied bronze bells to the white buskins or shanks they wore on their lower legs, and began to dance, in contrast to their slow processional walk, as if they were Corybants followers of the goddess Cybele.

After supper at Holyrood Palace, James and Anne watched a sword dance by the light of bonfires. Seventeen dancers wore bells and newly made suites or "stands" of Highland clothes, made by David Paterson.

=== The Jewel ===
The town of Edinburgh had obtained a royal jewel in security for a loan of £6,000 Scots to the king in 1584, a locket set with a diamond and emerald. In October 1589 the Provost John Arnot cancelled the loan and gave the jewel back to the King as a marriage gift. The jewel had remained in the family of a previous Provost, Alexander Clerk, and was delivered to William Fairlie, who commissioned the goldsmith David Gilbert to remake and enlarge it as a gift to present to the Queen. It is sometimes said the purpose of the original loan had been to finance ambassadors sent to England to plead for the life of Mary, Queen of Scots, but that loan seems to be a different transaction, for £4,000.

David Calderwood said the jewel was called the "A", probably referring to the crowned initial or cipher of "A" on its case. An account of payments made by William Fairlie for making the jewel, its case, the books given to the queen during the Entry, the "paill" canopy and other items, and the town treasurer's account with payments for building the scaffold, props and some costume, are still in Edinburgh City Archives.

=== The Danish party ===
Danish gentlemen in Edinburgh included the councillors: Admiral Peder Munk, Steen Brahe, Breide Rantzau, and Dr Nicolaus Theophilus; and the gentlemen: Ove Liunge, Jørgen Brahe (1553–1601), Hannibal Gyldenstierne of Restrup (1548–1608), Henning Giøye (marshal), Anders Thot, Steen Biter, Jakob Krabbe, Erik Kaas, Christian Friis, Cirsysest Tinshome, Bekis Linffinkit, Henning Reventlow (1551–1624), and "Pachin Webenn" or Joachim von Veltheim (1564–1621) from Braunschweig.

The officers of the ships included: Peder Munk, the admiral on the Gideon; Steen Madsen his lieutenant; Henrik Gyldenstierne the vice-admiral on the Josaphad with his lieutenant, Hans Concellour; Alexander Duram of the Raphael with his lieutenant Klaus Bold; Neils Skink of the Gabriel with his lieutenant Jakob Trugard; Hans Rostok of the Dove with Ove Winshour; Kild Bauld of the Blue Lion; Herwick Braun of the Little Sertoun; Hans Symonsoun of the Mouse; John Syde, captain of the Rose; Jørgen Mowst of the Falcon of Birren. Several of these men, with Scottish partners, rode before the queen's coach to the Entry on 19 May from Holyroodhouse to the West Port.

== Aftermath ==
=== The Banquet for the Danish ambassadors ===
On 23 May 1590 the town held a banquet for the Danish ambassadors in the Mint in the house of Thomas Acheson at the foot of Todrick's Wynd. John MacMorran was one of the organisers, arranging musicians and a guard of honour armed with polearms.

On 24 May the King gave a speech in St Giles thanking the people of Edinburgh for their hospitality and the expenses of the Entry. James VI wrote a letter to the Lords Deputies of Council who ruled Denmark as guardians of Christian IV on 25 May 1590, with his resolve to "maintain perpetually and inviolably" the connection between the nations.

On 26 May the Danish commissioners embarked on their ships, and the King gave them gold chains and gifts worth 4,500 crowns. One ambassador was given a gold chain worth 500 crowns paid for from the Queen's dowry. James VI and Anna rode on the sands of Leith in view of the ships lying at anchor. James VI left after a short time, hearing of a chance to capture the rebel Archibald Wauchope of Niddrie.

=== Earl of Worcester ===
On 13 June 1590 Edward Somerset, 4th Earl of Worcester travelled to Edinburgh to congratulate James VI on his safe return from Denmark and marriage to Anne of Denmark, and gave notice that the King was to join the Order of the Garter. At first, he was not able to see Anne of Denmark who had toothache, and he joked with John Maitland of Thirlestane that in England this would be interpreted as a sign she was pregnant. Worcester had an audience with Anne on 16 June, and gave her Queen Elizabeth's gifts of a cloak set with diamonds, a clock, and a gold chain, or pearl necklace, with a locket which the Countess of Mar placed on the Queen's neck. He was accompanied by Lord Compton who watched 'pastimes' or hunting on the sands of Leith. At first Elizabeth had thought of sending the Earl of Lincoln with the present of a bed. James Melville of Halhill was delegated to entertain the Earl of Worcester during his visit. James VI gave the Earl a present of a ring set with seven diamonds.

Anne of Denmark and her Danish guests stayed at Holyrood Palace until 18 July 1590, when she moved to Dunfermline Palace and visited Falkland Palace.

=== Entries to Perth and Dundee ===
Anne of Denmark made an "Entry" to the town of Perth on 29 June 1591. There are few records of the event at Perth, but Anne came there following the wedding of Lilias Murray and John Grant of Freuchie at Tullibardine, where James VI and his valet John Wemyss of Logie had performed a masque in costume. In December 1592 Anne of Denmark herself performed in costume in a masque at Holyrood Palace to celebrate her birthday and the wedding of her maid of honour, Marie Stewart.

There were plans for her to have Entries at Dundee and St Andrews in September 1595. She made her first Entry to Dundee on 13 September 1597. She planned to ride to Dundee from Perth with Mary Stewart, Mistress of Gray.

== Texts and publications ==
Several contemporary descriptions of the events exist, but the above description is taken mostly from a Danish account, not published until 1852. Some verses in Scots and Latin were printed. John Burrell's poem was included in a volume printed by Robert Waldegrave dedicated to the Duke of Lennox. Waldegrave also printed the Schediasmata de Nuptiis serenissimi potentissimique Scot. Regis Iacobi VI (Edinburgh, 1590) by Adrian Damman van Bisterfeld, a resident diplomat of the United Provinces.

Hercules Rollock was the schoolmaster of Edinburgh High School. He was credited with writing the verses on astrology and good fortune, which survive only in a Danish translation, and he would have been involved in writing, planning and rehearsing the Entry, which featured his pupils as pageant actors. His poem on the marriage De avgvstissimo Iacobi 6. Scotorum Regis, & Annæ Frederici 2. had been published in 1589.

The father of the boy who presented the keys to Anna at the West Port was the lawyer John Russell (d. 1612), who wrote an address to the queen on behalf of Edinburgh, which seems to be the speech made at the West Port, Verba Ioann. Russelli iureconsulti pro senatu populoque Edinburgensi habita, ad serenissimam scotorum reginam Annam dum Edinburgum ingreditur 19. Maij. An. 1590 (Edinburgh: Robert Waldegrave, 1590).

A Scottish narrative inspired a version printed in London, The ioyfull receiuing of Iames the sixt of that name King of Scotland, and Queene Anne his wife, into the townes of Lyeth and Edenborough the first daie of May last past. 1590, Together with the triumphs shewed before the coronation of the said Scottish Queene (London: printed for Henrie Carre, 1590).

A poem on the marriage by Jacob Jacobsen Wolf, known as Volfius, was printed as the Carmen in Nuptias Jacobi VI Regis Scotiae et Annae Frederici II filiae (Copenhagen: Lorentz Benedicht, 1590). The National Library of Scotland has a manuscript of this poem dedicated to John Maitland of Thirlestane.

Later, the poet Alexander Montgomerie wrote an epitaph for the twin brothers John and Patrick Schaues or Schaw alluding in the first line to their help as "ethnics" with pagan wisdom in aiding the king's decision to sail to Denmark, after their deaths in December 1591, when they defended the king and Holyroodhouse from Francis Stewart, 5th Earl of Bothwell.
