= Hercules Rollock =

Scottish schoolmaster and writer (fl. 1577–1599)

Hercules Rollock (fl. 1577–1599), Edinburgh schoolmaster and writer of Latin verse.

He was a son of George Rollock (died 1569), a burgess of Dundee, his mother may have been Margaret Wedderburn.

He graduated at the University of St Andrews, was regent at King's College, Aberdeen, and then spent several years abroad, chiefly in France, where he studied at Poitiers. He enjoyed the friendship of Joseph Justus Scaliger. In 1579 he stayed in Sussex with Sir Thomas Sackville and composed a Latin country house poem, which he presented to Sackville, praising the fruitful landscape and the rooms of Buckhurst Place with their painted inscriptions.

Returning to Scotland, he owed to the recommendation of Thomas Buchanan, a nephew of George Buchanan, his appointment in 1580 as commissary of St Andrews and the Carse of Gowrie. In 1584 he became master of the High School of Edinburgh. From this post he was removed in 1595, after the murder of John MacMorran by his pupils. He subsequently held some office in connection with the courts of justice.

His earliest dated epigram refers to the comet of 1577 as a warning to Catherine de' Medici. His poems are to be found in Arthur Johnston's Delitiæ Poetarum Scotorum (1637). He wrote verses on various topical subjects, including the St. Bartholomew's Day massacre, the political ascendency of James Stewart, Earl of Arran, and the marriages of James VI of Scotland and Anne of Denmark, and John Maitland of Thirlestane and Jean Fleming. He was probably the author of verses recited by school children on 19 May 1590 during the ceremonial Entry of Anne of Denmark in Edinburgh, known only from Danish translations.

A 1597 letter of his to the Secretary Lord Menmuir has been published. It includes news of the marriage of the lawyer Thomas Hamilton to Margaret Foulis, and court news.

In an undated Apologia, written at the end of his tenth lustrum, he speaks of his wife and numerous family. He died before 5 March 1599. The Edinburgh magistrates gave an allowance to his widow Helen Barroun, a daughter of James Barroun, and their children, and a tocher or dowry of 1000 merks for their daughter Jean Rollok whenever she married a "worthy person".
