= Aga Mikolaj =

Polish operatic soprano (1971–2021)

- Aga Mikolaj in 2018
- Born: Agnieszka Beata Mikołajczyk; 7 March 1971; Kutno, Poland
- Died: 11 November 2021 (aged 50)
- Education: Poznań Academy of Music; University of Music and Performing Arts Vienna
- Occupation: Classical soprano
- Organizations: Teatr Wielki, Poznań; Bavarian State Opera
- Website: www.agamikolaj.com

Agnieszka Beata Mikołajczyk (7 March 1971 – 11 November 2021), better known by her stage name Aga Mikolaj, was a Polish operatic soprano who made an international career.

She was a member of the Bavarian State Opera in Munich from 2002 to 2007, focusing on Mozart roles, especially Donna Elvira in Don Giovanni, and performed from San Francisco to Tokyo. She performed and recorded Four Last Songs by Richard Strauss, Penderecki's The Seven Gates of Jerusalem, and Detlev Glanert's Requiem for Hieronymus Bosch, live in Rotterdam in 2016 in its first recording.

== Life and career ==
Born in Kutno on 7 March 1971, Mikolaj studied at the Academy of Music in Poznań with Antonina Kawecka from 1990 to 1996. During her studies, she received a scholarship from the University of Music and Performing Arts Vienna. In 1997, Mikolaj took master classes with Renata Scotto and in 2001 with Elisabeth Schwarzkopf, who coached her until her death in 2006. Mikolaj won prizes at international singing competitions, such as in 1995 the 3rd Prize of the Ada Sari Competition in Nowy Sącz, in 1996 both the Audience Prize and the G. F. Handel Award of the 41st International Vocal Competition 's-Hertogenbosch, and in 1999 both the 2nd Prize and the Verdi Prize at the International Alfredo Kraus Competition, Las Palmas.

=== Opera ===
Mikolaj's artistic career began at the Teatr Wielki in Poznań (1995–2002), where she performed as Countess Almaviva in Mozart's Le nozze di Figaro, Pamina in The Magic Flute and Rachel in Meyerbeer's La Juive. She appeared as a guest at the Grand Theatre, Warsaw and at the opera houses of Łódź, Wroclaw, Luxembourg, Heilbronn and Staatsoper Hannover.

She was a member of the ensemble of the Bavarian State Opera in Munich from 2002 to 2007, appearing as Pamina, Countess Almaviva, Donna Elvira in Mozart's Don Giovanni, Ännchen in Weber's Der Freischütz, Drusilla in Monteverdi's L'incoronazione di Poppea, Gretel in Humperdinck's Hänsel und Gretel, Marzelline in Beethoven's Fidelio, Euridice in Gluck's Orfeo ed Euridice, Najade in Ariadne auf Naxos by Richard Strauss, Almirena in Handel's Rinaldo, and Musetta in Puccini's La Bohème.

Mikolaj appeared as a guest at European opera houses, performing roles such as Pamina and Eva in Wagner's Die Meistersinger von Nürnberg at the Aalto-Theater, Countess Almaviva at the Opéra Bastille and Micaela in Bizet's Carmen at the Vienna Volksoper. In 2004, Mikolaj toured Japan with the Vienna State Opera, conducted by Seiji Ozawa, as Elvira in Don Giovanni. Her Glyndebourne Festival Opera debut as Fiordiligi in Mozart's Così fan tutte took place as part of a tour in the fall of 2006.

In the 2008/09 season, Mikolaj appeared as Donna Elvira at the Opéra de Monte-Carlo, at the Hessisches Staatstheater Wiesbaden, the New National Theatre Tokyo and at the Vienna State Opera and guest performance at the Budapest Spring Festival. In 2012, this role was her first performance with the Los Angeles Philharmonic conducted by Gustavo Dudamel. She appeared in a joint production of the Berlin State Opera and La Scala in Milan, as Woglinde in Wagner's Der Ring des Nibelungen conducted by Daniel Barenboim, which was also presented at the Proms.

=== Concert ===
As a concert singer, Mikolaj had a broad repertoire that included major works from Bach to Penderecki. She performed Mahler's Symphony No. 4 with Kent Nagano, and Penderecki's The Seven Gates of Jerusalem in Valencia and Warsaw. Mikolaj worked with various conductors, including Ivor Bolton, Ádám Fischer, Philippe Jordan, Zubin Mehta and Antoni Wit. In 2013, she first appeared with the Concertgebouworkest in Verdi's Requiem conducted by Mariss Jansons. A reviewer of a 2015 concert with the Boston Philharmonic Orchestra conducted by Benjamin Zander noted that, in Four Last Songs by Richard Strauss, "she exhibited a degree of abandon and rapture" and her "sublime rendering of 'So tief in Abendrot'". He added that for Mahler's Symphony No. 4, "she had the right affect" for "a child's vision of heaven".

== Personal life ==
Mikolaj was married to the Austrian conductor Karl Sollak; they had no children.

Mikolaj died on 11 November 2021, from complications of COVID-19 during the COVID-19 pandemic in Poland, at the age of 50.

== Recordings ==
Mikolaj recorded Penderecki's The Seven Gates of Jerusalem released by Naxos records, which was nominated for the 50th Annual Grammy Awards. She recorded Schubert's Der vierjährige Posten and Die Zwillingsbrüder, released by Phoenix Edition. In 2009, she recorded her first solo CD, including the Four Last Songs by Strauss, with the WDR Rundfunkorchester Köln, Cologne, conducted by Karl Sollak. A reviewer noted her "marvellous intonation, a mellow-roasted, lyrical voice, generally exquisite phrasing and a well-trained 'squilla' over the orchestra". She was the soprano soloist in the first recording of Detlev Glanert's Requiem for Hieronymus Bosch, live in Rotterdam in 2016, conducted by Markus Stenz.
