= Symphony No. 7 (Penderecki) =

Symphony by Krzysztof Penderecki

- "Seven Gates of Jerusalem"
- Choral symphony by Krzysztof Penderecki
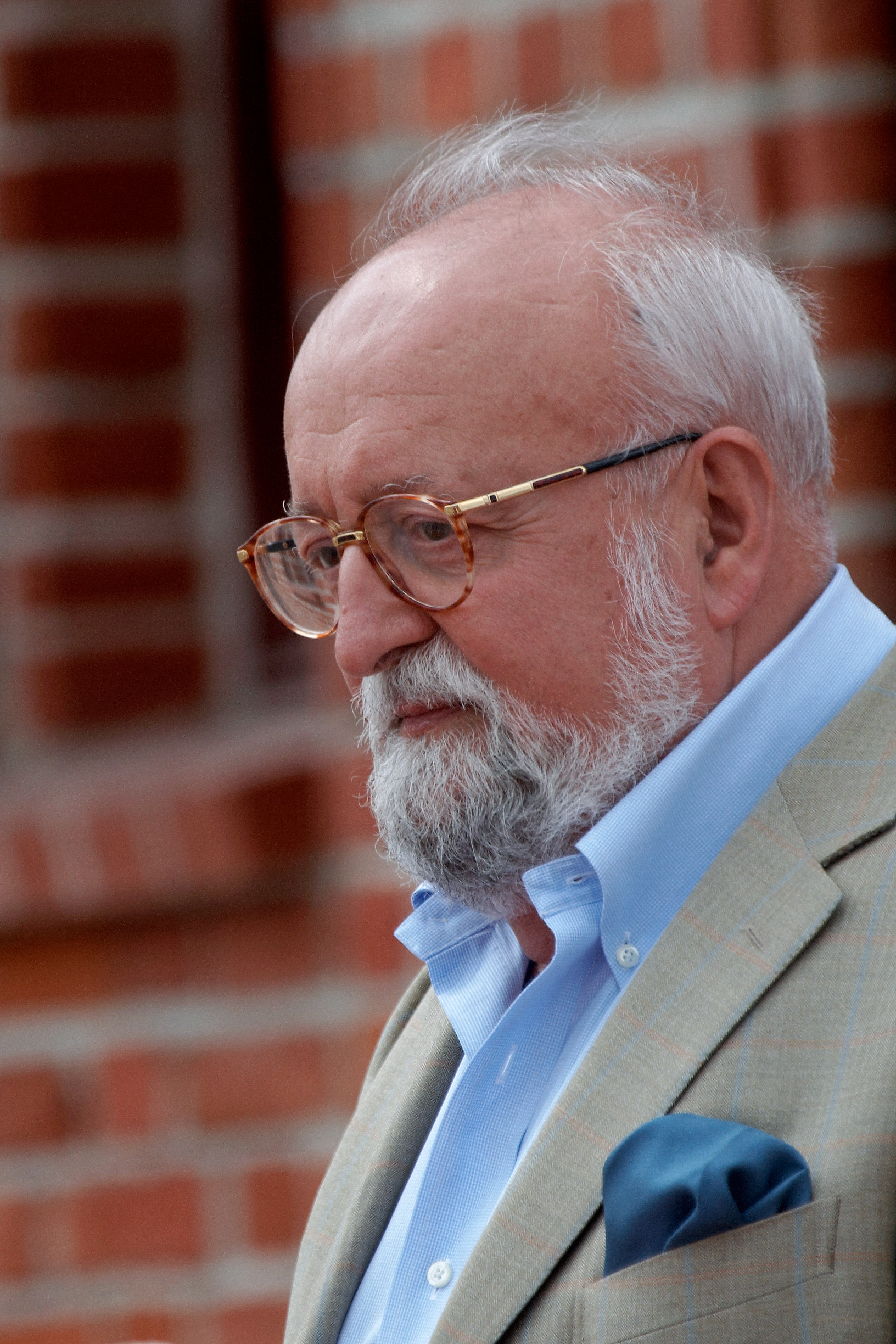
- The composer in 2008
- Occasion: Third millennium of Jerusalem
- Text: Biblical texts
- Language: Latin, Hebrew
- Composed: 1996
- Performed: January 1997, Jerusalem
- Duration: 60 min.
- Movements: 7
- Scoring: 5 soloists; narrator; choir; orchestra

Krzysztof Penderecki wrote his Seventh Symphony, subtitled "Seven Gates of Jerusalem", in 1996 to commemorate the third millennium of the city of Jerusalem. Originally conceived as an oratorio, this choral symphony was premièred in Jerusalem in January 1997; it was only after the first Polish performance two months later that Penderecki decided to call it a symphony. It is written for two sopranos, alto, tenor, bass, narrator, chorus and orchestra.

== Movements ==
The symphony is written in seven movements and lasts approximately 60 minutes:

1. Magnus Dominus et laudabilis nimis in civitate (Great is the Lord, and to be praised, from Psalm 48)
2. Si oblitus fuero tui, Ierusalem (If I forget you, Jerusalem, from Psalm 137)
3. De profundis (Out of the depths, Psalm 130)
4. Si oblitus fuero tui, Ierusalem (If I forget you, Jerusalem)
5. Lauda, Jerusalem, Dominum (Praise the Lord, Jerusalem, Psalm 147)
6. Hajetà alai jad adonài (The hand of the Lord was upon me, Ezechiel 37, 1–10)
7. Haec dicit Dominus (Thus says the Lord)

== Instrumentation ==
The symphony is scored for 4 flutes (3rd & 4th doubling piccolos), 3 oboes, cor anglais (English horn), 3 clarinets (3rd doubling E♭ clarinet), bass clarinet, 3 bassoons, contrabassoon, 4 horns, 3 trumpets, 4 trombones, bass tuba, 2 sets of timpani, 2 bass drums, 2 snare drums, 2 pairs of crash cymbals, 4 suspended cymbals, 2 triangles, tambourine, large gong, 2 tam-tams, 1 pair of timbales, 1 set of temple blocks, 4 tom-toms, tenor drum, glockenspiel, xylophone, marimba, vibraphone, 2 tubaphones, 1 set of antique cymbals, 1 set of tubular bells, celesta, piano, organ (ad lib), harp, 18 1st violins, 16 2nd violins, 12 violas, 12 cellos, and 8 double basses

In addition, there are offstage parts for 3 clarinets (3rd doubling E♭ clarinet), bass clarinet, 3 bassoons, contrabassoon, 4 horns, 2 trumpets (plus a bass trumpet, prominent in the 6th movement), 4 trombones and bass tuba.

== Overview ==
=== Composition ===
In 1995 Penderecki was commissioned to write a work to commemorate the third millennium of Jerusalem, a city the composer had first visited in 1974 in the aftermath of the Yom Kippur War. Penderecki decided to write an oratorio titled Seven Gates of Jerusalem (there is an eighth "golden" gate but, according to Jewish tradition, this is reserved for the arrival of the Messiah). Penderecki composed the work between April and December 1996. The work was premiered in Jerusalem on 9 January 1997; the orchestra included members of the Jerusalem Symphony Orchestra and Bavarian Radio Symphony Orchestra, conducted by Lorin Maazel. The Polish premiere followed on 14 March 1997, under the direction of Kazimierz Kord. It was only after the Polish performance that the composer decided to call the work his Seventh Symphony, though he had not yet completed his Sixth Symphony (which would eventually be published and premiered in 2017). The composer has since also written an Eighth Symphony, which like the Seventh is a choral symphony.

In categorizing the work, James L. Zychowicz writes in his review:

This work also belongs to the choral symphony of the nineteenth century, reminiscent in a sense of Mahler’s Eighth Symphony for its use of voices throughout the work. Similarly, Mahler’s efforts to bring together different texts—in the case of the Eighth Symphony, the Latin hymn “Veni creator spiritus” and the final scene from the second part of Goethe’s Faust, Penderecki combined verses from various psalms, as well as different parts of the Old Testament. Psalms and prophetic texts are brought together in this Jerusalem–inspired work which, in this sense, reflects those aspects of the old city as a place of worship and a locus of prophetic vision. In this sense, it is a return to those seventeenth-century composers, whose works use large forces along with concertato sonorities to present biblical texts, but conceived along much larger lines.

Zychowicz adds that while "each of the movements is distinct enough to stand on its own merits, ... when conceived together, [they] form a cohesive symphonic structure."

The text of the symphony is written primarily in Latin, while the sixth movement, "the most dramatic of the entire work," is written in Hebrew; the text in this penultimate movement, taken from the book of Ezekiel, is presented by a speaker.

=== Significance of the number seven ===
While the symphony is not a pictorial or descriptive work, the number seven plays a significant part in it. The work is not only written in seven movements but is "pervaded by the number 'seven' at various levels," with an extensive system of seven-note phrases binding the work together, "while the frequent presence of seven notes repeated at a single pitch will be evident even on a first hearing, as also the seven fortissimo chords bringing the seventh and final movement to an end."

=== Musical manipulation of text ===
Zychowicz states that the composer's manipulation of text may have been an important factor in shaping the musical structure of the work, as well. By setting selected verses instead of complete psalms, "he gave the text focus and clarity.... Taken together, the verses for the first movement are ... essentially a new text, albeit one redolent of the psalter." Zychowicz cites the last movement as another example of textual manipulation "as Penderecki combines verses from three prophetic books, and then returns to the psalms, eventually bringing back the verse with which the Symphony opened." This manipulation of text, Zychowicz writes, "suggests a level of composition ... that is linked to the musical structure of the work."

== Order of text ==
Magnus Dominus et laudabilis nimis in civitate
Psalm 47 (48):1
Psalm 95 (96):1–3
Psalm 47 (48):1
Psalm 47 (48):13
Psalm 47 (48):1
Si oblitus fuero tui, Ierusalem
Psalm 136 (137):5
De profundis clamavi ad te, Domine
Psalm 129 (130): 1–5
Si oblitus fuero tui, Ierusalem
Psalm 136 (137):5
Isaiah 26:2
Isaiah 52:1
Psalm 136 (137):5
Lauda, Ierusalem, Dominum
Psalm 147:12–14
Hajetà alai jad adonài
Ezekiel 37: 1–10
Haec dicit Dominus
Jeremiah 21:8
Daniel 7:13
Isaiah 59:19
Isaiah 60:1–2
Psalm 47 (48):1
Isaiah 60:11
Psalm 95 (96):1; 2–3
Psalm 47 (48):1
Psalm 47(48):13
Psalm 47(48):1
Psalm 47(48):13

== Bibliography ==
- Whitehouse, Richard, notes to Naxos 8.557766, Krzysztof Penderecki: Symphony No. 7 "Seven Gates of Jerusalem"; Olga Pasichnyk, soprano; Aga Mikolaj, soprano; Ewa Marciniec, alto; Wieslaw Ochman, tenor; Romuald Tesarowicz, bass; Boris Carmeli, narrator; Warsaw National Philharmonic Choir and Warsaw National Philharmonic Orchestra conducted by Antoni Wit. (Hong Kong: Naxos Rights International Ltd., 2006.)
- Zychowicz, James L. (19 April 2007). "Review: PENDERECKI: Symphony no. 7". Opera Today.
