= Łódź Philharmonic =

Symphony orchestra in Łódź, Poland

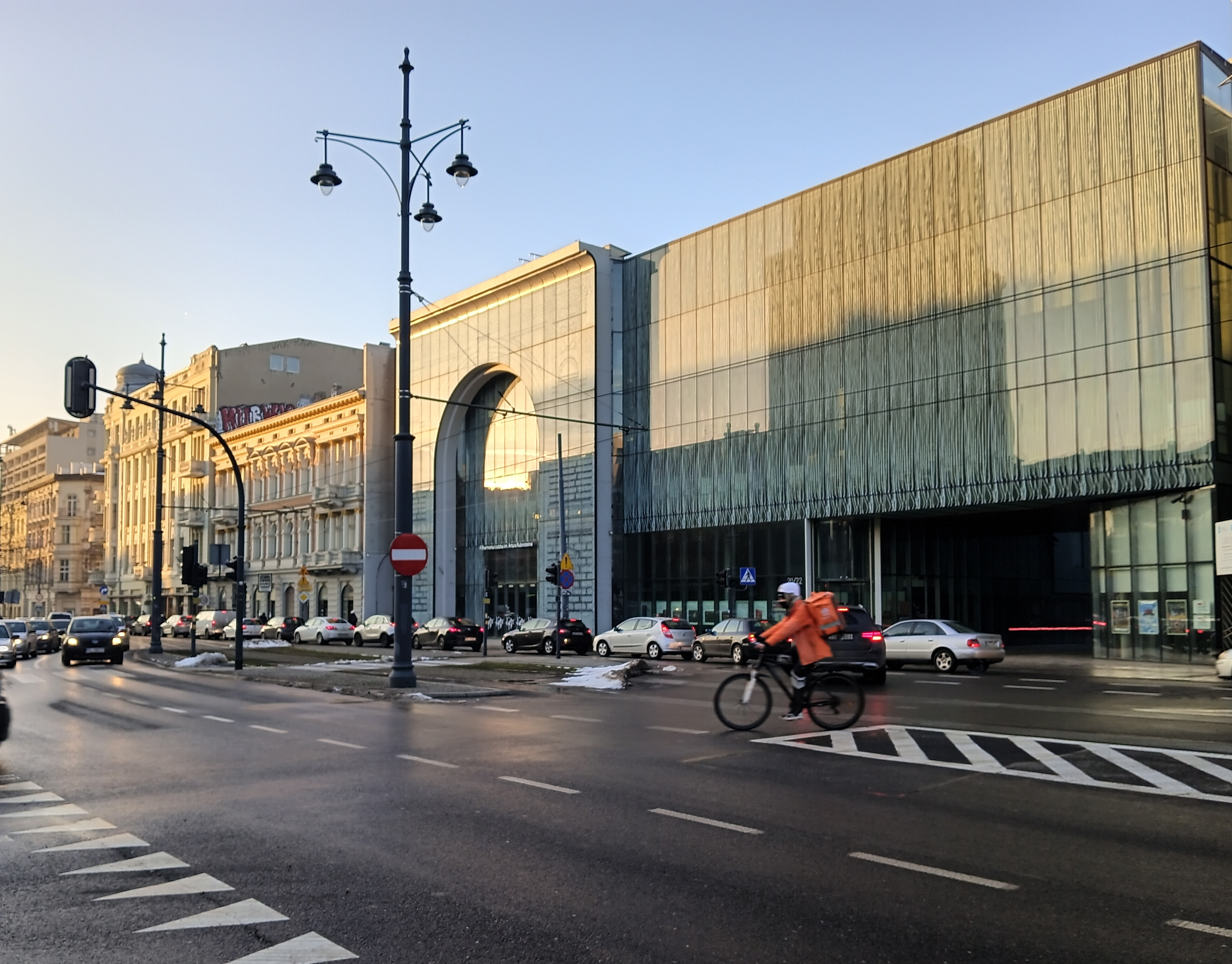
Łódź Philharmonic (2025)

The Arthur Rubinstein Łódź Philharmonic (Polish: Filharmonia Łódzka) is a professional symphony orchestra based in Łódź, Poland. It was founded in 1915 by composer and conductor Tadeusz Mazurkiewicz and Gotliba Teschnera, a cello instructor and bookstore owner. The men organized the orchestra initially as a temporary ensemble to play for a benefit for impoverished musicians. The orchestra was made up of approximately 60 musicians, both professional and amateur. The enthusiastic reception of this benefit concert drew the patronage of industrialist Karol Wilhelm Scheilbler, who provided the finances necessary to make the orchestra a permanent ensemble. Mazurkiewicz was appointed the orchestra's first director.

In 1934 the orchestra ceased activities, but resumed performances in 1938. World War II halted concerts again, with performances resuming following the end of the war. Initially after the war, it was called the Municipal Philharmonic. Beginning in 1949, it was called the State Philharmonic in Łódź. In 1984, it was renamed after Arthur Rubinstein.

The orchestra's current home is the Łódzki Dom Koncertowy, a concert hall built for the orchestra that was inaugurated in 2004. Conductor Lech Dzierżanowski has served as the orchestra's General and Artistic Director since 2007.
