= Psalm 48 =

Biblical psalm

- "Great is the LORD, and greatly to be praised"
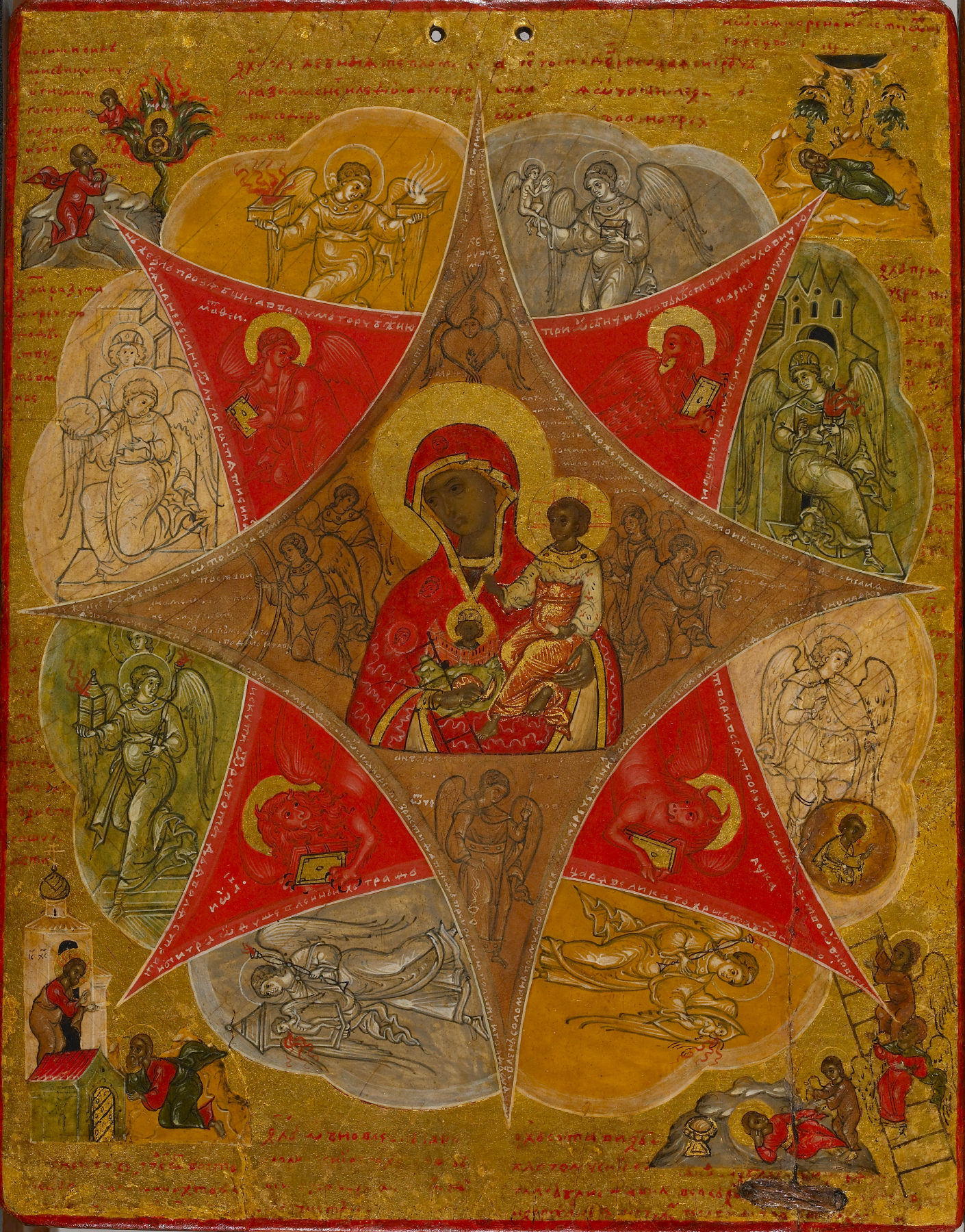
- Psalm 48 quoted on the back of a 17th-century double-sided icon held in Jerusalem
- Other name: Psalm 47; "Magnus Dominus"
- Language: Hebrew (original)

Psalm 48
- ← Psalm 47 Psalm 49 →
- Book: Book of Psalms
- Hebrew Bible part: Ketuvim
- Order in the Hebrew part: 1
- Category: Sifrei Emet
- Christian Bible part: Old Testament
- Order in the Christian part: 19

Psalm 48 is the 48th psalm of the Book of Psalms, beginning in English in the King James Version: "Great is the LORD, and greatly to be praised in the city of our God". In the slightly different numbering system used in the Greek Septuagint version of the bible, and generally in its Latin translations, this psalm is Psalm 47. In the Vulgate, it begins "Magnus Dominus". The psalm was composed by the sons of Korah, as "a celebration of the security of Zion", In its heading it is referred to as both a "song" and a "psalm".

The psalm forms a regular part of Jewish, Catholic, Lutheran, Anglican and other Protestant liturgies, and has been set to music. Bach's 1729 cantata Gott, wie dein Name, so ist auch dein Ruhm, BWV 171, begins with verse 10 in German, and Penderecki's 1996 Symphony No. 7 begins with the first verse.

== Uses ==
=== New Testament ===
In the New Testament, verse 2 of Psalm 48 is quoted in Matthew 5:35.

=== Judaism ===
- This psalm is the psalm of the day in the Shir Shel Yom for Monday.
- Verse 2 is part of Mishnah Tamid 7:4.
- Verse 12 is part of the blessings before the Shema.

=== Book of Common Prayer ===
In the Church of England's Book of Common Prayer, this psalm is appointed to be read on the evening of the ninth day of the month, as well as at Mattins on Whitsunday.

== Musical settings ==
Heinrich Schütz wrote a setting of a paraphrase of Psalm 48 in German, "Groß ist der Herr und hoch gepreist", SWV 145, for the Becker Psalter, published first in 1628. Magnus Dominus, in Latin, was set to music by François Giroust (1778), Charles Levens and Joseph Cassanéa de Mondonville (1734) and by Richard Smallwood (1992).

Bach's cantata Gott, wie dein Name, so ist auch dein Ruhm, BWV 171, begins with verse 10 in German.

Penderecki's 1996 Symphony No. 7, a choral symphony subtitled "The Seven Gates of Jerusalem", begins with the first verse.

== Text ==
The following table shows the Hebrew text of the Psalm with vowels, alongside the Koine Greek text in the Septuagint and the English translation from the King James Version. Note that the meaning can slightly differ between these versions, as the Septuagint and the Masoretic Text come from different textual traditions. (Note: A 1917 translation directly from Hebrew to English by the Jewish Publication Society can be found here or here, and an 1844 translation directly from the Septuagint by L. C. L. Brenton can be found here. Both translations are in the public domain.) In the Septuagint, this psalm is numbered Psalm 47.

#	Hebrew	English	Greek
(Note: In the Jewish verse numbering, the ascription of this psalm is verse 1, and the rest of the psalm begins from verse 2. However, the Christian verse numbering does not count the ascription as a separate verse.)	שִׁ֥יר מִ֝זְמ֗וֹר לִבְנֵי־קֹֽרַח׃	(A Song and Psalm for the sons of Korah.)	Ψαλμὸς ᾠδῆς τοῖς υἱοῖς Κορέ· δευτέρα σαββάτου. -
1	גָּ֘ד֤וֹל יְהֹוָ֣ה וּמְהֻלָּ֣ל מְאֹ֑ד בְּעִ֥יר אֱ֝לֹהֵ֗ינוּ הַר־קׇדְשֽׁוֹ׃	Great is the LORD, and greatly to be praised in the city of our God, in the mountain of his holiness.	ΜΕΓΑΣ Κύριος καὶ αἰνετὸς σφόδρα ἐν πόλει τοῦ Θεοῦ ἡμῶν, ἐν ὄρει ἁγίῳ αὐτοῦ,
2	יְפֵ֥ה נוֹף֮ מְשׂ֢וֹשׂ כׇּל־הָ֫אָ֥רֶץ הַר־צִ֭יּוֹן יַרְכְּתֵ֣י צָפ֑וֹן קִ֝רְיַ֗ת מֶ֣לֶךְ רָֽב׃	Beautiful for situation, the joy of the whole earth, is mount Zion, on the sides of the north, the city of the great King.	εὐρίζῳ ἀγαλλιάματι πάσης τῆς γῆς. ὄρη Σιών, τὰ πλευρὰ τοῦ Βορρᾶ, ἡ πόλις τοῦ βασιλέως τοῦ μεγάλου.
3	אֱלֹהִ֥ים בְּאַרְמְנוֹתֶ֗יהָ נוֹדַ֥ע לְמִשְׂגָּֽב׃	God is known in her palaces for a refuge.	ὁ Θεὸς ἐν τοῖς βάρεσιν αὐτῆς γινώσκεται, ὅταν ἀντιλαμβάνηται αὐτῆς.
4	כִּֽי־הִנֵּ֣ה הַ֭מְּלָכִים נ֥וֹעֲד֑וּ עָבְר֥וּ יַחְדָּֽו׃	For, lo, the kings were assembled, they passed by together.	ὅτι ἰδοὺ οἱ βασιλεῖς τῆς γῆς συνήχθησαν, ἤλθοσαν ἐπὶ τὸ αὐτό·
5	הֵ֣מָּה רָ֭אוּ כֵּ֣ן תָּמָ֑הוּ נִבְהֲל֥וּ נֶחְפָּֽזוּ	They saw it, and so they marvelled; they were troubled, and hasted away.	αὐτοὶ ἰδόντες οὕτως ἐθαύμασαν, ἐταράχθησαν, ἐσαλεύθησαν,
6	רְ֭עָדָה אֲחָזָ֣תַם שָׁ֑ם חִ֝֗יל כַּיּוֹלֵדָֽה׃	Fear took hold upon them there, and pain, as of a woman in travail.	τρόμος ἐπελάβετο αὐτῶν, ἐκεῖ ὠδῖνες ὡς τικτούσης.
7	בְּר֥וּחַ קָדִ֑ים תְּ֝שַׁבֵּ֗ר אֳנִיּ֥וֹת תַּרְשִֽׁישׁ׃	Thou breakest the ships of Tarshish with an east wind.	ἐν πνεύματι βιαίῳ συντρίψεις πλοῖα Θαρσίς.
8	כַּאֲשֶׁ֤ר שָׁמַ֨עְנוּ ׀ כֵּ֤ן רָאִ֗ינוּ בְּעִיר־יְהֹוָ֣ה צְ֭בָאוֹת בְּעִ֣יר אֱלֹהֵ֑ינוּ אֱלֹ֘הִ֤ים יְכוֹנְנֶ֖הָ עַד־עוֹלָ֣ם סֶֽלָה׃	As we have heard, so have we seen in the city of the LORD of hosts, in the city of our God: God will establish it for ever. Selah.	καθάπερ ἠκούσαμεν, οὕτω καὶ εἴδομεν ἐν πόλει Κυρίου τῶν δυνάμεων, ἐν πόλει τοῦ Θεοῦ ἡμῶν· ὁ Θεὸς ἐθεμελίωσεν αὐτὴν εἰς τὸν αἰῶνα. (διάψαλμα).
9	דִּמִּ֣ינוּ אֱלֹהִ֣ים חַסְדֶּ֑ךָ בְּ֝קֶ֗רֶב הֵיכָלֶֽךָ׃	We have thought of thy lovingkindness, O God, in the midst of thy temple.	ὑπελάβομεν, ὁ Θεός, τὸ ἔλεός σου ἐν μέσῳ τοῦ λαοῦ σου.
10	כְּשִׁמְךָ֤ אֱלֹהִ֗ים כֵּ֣ן תְּ֭הִלָּתְךָ עַל־קַצְוֵי־אֶ֑רֶץ צֶ֝֗דֶק מָלְאָ֥ה יְמִינֶֽךָ׃	According to thy name, O God, so is thy praise unto the ends of the earth: thy right hand is full of righteousness.	κατὰ τὸ ὄνομά σου, ὁ Θεός, οὕτω καὶ ἡ αἴνεσίς σου ἐπὶ τὰ πέρατα τῆς γῆς· δικαιοσύνης πλήρης ἡ δεξιά σου.
11	יִשְׂמַ֤ח ׀ הַר־צִיּ֗וֹן תָּ֭גֵלְנָה בְּנ֣וֹת יְהוּדָ֑ה לְ֝מַ֗עַן מִשְׁפָּטֶֽיךָ׃	Let mount Zion rejoice, let the daughters of Judah be glad, because of thy judgments.	εὐφρανθήτω τὸ ὄρος Σιών, ἀγαλλιάσθωσαν αἱ θυγατέρες τῆς ᾿Ιουδαίας ἕνεκεν κριμάτων σου, Κύριε.
12	סֹ֣בּוּ צִ֭יּוֹן וְהַקִּיפ֑וּהָ סִ֝פְר֗וּ מִגְדָּלֶֽיהָ׃	Walk about Zion, and go round about her: tell the towers thereof.	κυκλώσατε Σιὼν καὶ περιλάβετε αὐτήν, διηγήσασθε ἐν τοῖς πύργοις αὐτῆς,
13	שִׁ֤יתוּ לִבְּכֶ֨ם ׀ לְֽחֵילָ֗הֿ פַּסְּג֥וּ אַרְמְנוֹתֶ֑יהָ לְמַ֥עַן תְּ֝סַפְּר֗וּ לְד֣וֹר אַֽחֲרֽוֹן׃	Mark ye well her bulwarks, consider her palaces; that ye may tell it to the generation following.	θέσθε τὰς καρδίας ὑμῶν εἰς τὴν δύναμιν αὐτῆς καὶ καταδιέλεσθε τὰς βάρεις αὐτῆς, ὅπως ἂν διηγήσησθε εἰς γενεὰν ἑτέραν.
14	כִּ֤י זֶ֨ה ׀ אֱלֹהִ֣ים אֱ֭לֹהֵינוּ עוֹלָ֣ם וָעֶ֑ד ה֖וּא יְנַהֲגֵ֣נוּ עַל־מֽוּת׃	For this God is our God for ever and ever: he will be our guide even unto death.	ὅτι οὗτός ἐστιν ὁ Θεὸς ἡμῶν εἰς τὸν αἰῶνα καὶ εἰς τὸν αἰῶνα τοῦ αἰῶνος· αὐτὸς ποιμανεῖ ἡμᾶς εἰς τοὺς αἰῶνας.

=== Heading ===
The psalm is described initially as A Song. A Psalm of the sons of Korah. Theologian Albert Barnes writes: "The two appellations, song and psalm, would seem to imply that it was intended to 'combine' what was implied in both these words; that is, that it embraced what was usually understood by the word psalm, and that it was intended also specifically to be sung.
