= Karl Sollak =

Austrian conductor

- Born: 27 October 1956 (age 69); Vienna
- Occupation: Conductor
- Spouse: Aga Mikolaj
- Website: www.karlsollak.com

Karl Sollak (born 27 October 1956) is an Austrian conductor. He worked internationally, focused on opera. He conducted concerts and recordings with tenor Plácido Domingo and soprano Aga Mikolaj, his wife.

== Life ==
Born in Vienna on 27 October 1956, Sollak began his musical career with the Vienna Boys' Choir. He studied horn, piano and conducting at the University of Music and Performing Arts Vienna

From 1979 to 1991, he was répétiteur at the Vienna State Opera and assisted conductors such as Claudio Abbado, Lorin Maazel, Michel Plasson, Leonard Slatkin and Riccardo Muti, and also James Levine in recordings. As part of the opera studio of the State Opera, he conducted the Austrian premiere of Udo Zimmermann's opera Weisse Rose at the Künstlerhaus Wien.

Sollak conducted ballet performances at the Vienna State Opera in the 1980s, and has appeared at the Tiroler Landestheater Innsbruck. He conducted new productions of La traviata at the Washington Opera in 1997 and of Beethoven's Fidelio at the Irish National Opera in Dublin. He conducted Mozart's Don Giovanni at the Státní opera Praha, Verdi's Un ballo in maschera at the Chattanooga Opera, Bellini's I Capuleti e i Montecchiat the Tenerife Opera, and Puccini's Tosca at the Finnish National Opera. His operatic repertoire includes also Ariadne auf Naxos by Richard Strauss, Rossini's L'italiana in Algeri, Puccini's La bohème and Bizet's Carmen.

Sollak made his US debut with the Minnesota Orchestra in 1993. He was principal conductor of the Puerto Rico Symphony Orchestra in 1993 and 1994. Before becoming music director in Puerto Rico, he taught briefly at DePaul University, where he conducted the university orchestra. In 1997 he conducted the gala concert in honour of Mayor Rudolph Giuliani (with Mirella Freni and Plácido Domingo) at the New York City Opera. In his appearances in the US and Canada, Sollak has conducted concerts in New York's David Geffen Hall, Chicago, Milwaukee, Hartford, Cleveland, Pittsburgh and Philadelphia, also with Aga Mikolaj and Jerry Hadley, as well as in Montreal, Toronto and Calgary.

Sollak conducted concerts with instrumentalists Nelson Freire, Barbara Moser and Itzhak Perlman, and with singers Renata Scotto, Anna Netrebko and José Carreras. He conducted a dozen concerts with Domingo from 1995 onwards, such as at the Bill Graham Civic Auditorium in San Francisco for 4,000 spectators, conducting the San Francisco Opera Orchestra. In 1998, he conducted the final concert at the singer's Domingo's Operalia singing competition in Hamburg. He made his debut in Japan in June 2000, conducting Domingo's televised "Millennium Concert" in Tokyo.

In 1999, Sollak conducted the comeback concert of tenor Franco Bonisolli at the Wiener Konzerthaus, which was followed by performances in Graz, Poznań and Vienna (Wiener Musikverein), together with Franz Grundheber. He also conducted concerts with Cheryl Studer in Wroclaw, with Luis Lima and Mara Zampieri in Paris, and with Aga Mikolaj in the US and Poland, and conducted concerts at the Vienna Musikverein. In 2004 he made his debut at the Volksoper Wien, conducting Mozart's Don Giovanni and Verdi's La traviata, in 2005 in Oviedo and in 2006 in Madrid. He gave guest performances at festivals including the Prague Autumn and the Carcassonne Festival in France. He opened the Al Bustan Festival in Beirut in 2008 with the Lebanese National Symphony Orchestra.

=== Personal life ===
Sollak was married to the Polish soprano Aga Mikolaj who died in 2021; they had no children.

== Recordings ==
Sollak conducted the Münchner Rundfunkorchester for radio recordings with works by Elgar, Stravinsky and Sibelius. He recorded the Four Last Songs by R. Strauss with his wife as the soprano, live with Győr Philharmonic Orchestra. and in studio with the WDR Symphony Orchestra Cologne, combined with arias by Mozart and Strauss, in 2011. He also conducted a CD production with Plácido Domingo (Placido Domingo live in Seoul) and a live recording with Franco Bonisolli in Graz.
