= Wardlaw =

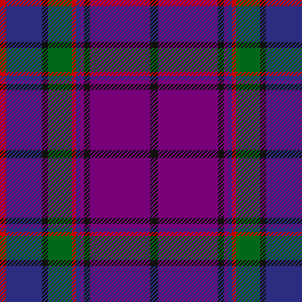
The Wardlaw tartan pattern.

Wardlaw is a first name and surname of Scottish origin.

Wardlaw loosely translates to "watcher of the hill". The original Wardlaws resided in the Scottish Highlands, hence "watch of the hill," where as Wardlows resided in the Scottish Lowlands.

The modern placenames of Wardlaw stem from the old English combination of watch and mound hill. Those being weard ‘watch’ + hlāw ‘mound hill’. Other representations of Wardlaw throughout history are "Geard-hlaw", and "Wardelaue".

Family Motto: "Famalias Firmat Pietas." ("Religion Strengthens Families.")

== Origins ==
Wardlaw according to Playfair in his British Family Antiquity, Vol. VIII, published in 1811 is amongst the oldest in Scotland. The surname most likely traces it place of origin to Kirkhill, Highland within the Inverness region. There the parish was formally called Wardlaw with origins tracing back to the 13th century. The first recordings of Wardlaw are said to have occurred around 1210 AD but the first certain recording appeared when "Henricus de Wardlaw was given a charter for half of the barony of Wiltone, in the county of Roxburgh." Though the surname appeared as Wardelaue.

== Persons ==
- Jesse Tawhiao-Wardlaw (born 2000), Australian rules footballer
- Alan Wardlaw (1887–1938), Australian politician
- Barbara Wardlaw (contemporary), Canadian politician of the First Nations
- Chris Wardlaw (born 1950), Australian long-distance runner
- Claude Wardlaw (1901–1985), British botanist
- Elizabeth, Lady Wardlaw (1677–1727), Scottish noblewoman and poet
- Helen Wardlaw (born 1982), English cricketer
- Henry Wardlaw (died 1440), Scottish church leader, Bishop of St Andrews, founder of the University of St Andrews
- Henry Wardlaw of Pitreavie (1565–1637), Scottish courtier and administrator for Anne of Denmark
- Iain Wardlaw (born 1985), Scottish cricketer
- Jack Wardlaw (1937–2012), American journalist* Joanna Wardlaw (born 1958), Scottish physician, radiologist, and academic
- John Wardlaw-Milne (1879–1967), British politician for Kidderminster
- Kim McLane Wardlaw (born 1954), American jurist in the federal courts
- Lee Wardlaw (contemporary), American author of children's books
- Nicolas Wardlaw, Lady Bonnyton, Scottish lady-in-waiting
- Ralph Wardlaw (1779–1853), Scottish Presbyterian clergyman and writer
- Robert Wardlaw (1889–1964), Australian politician from Tasmania
- Walter Wardlaw (died c. 1387), Scottish Bishop of Glasgow, uncle of Henry Wardlaw
- Gareth Wardlaw (born 1979), Scottish former footballer.

== Peerage ==
- Wardlaw baronets, a title in the Baronetage of Nova Scotia

== Places ==
- Wardlaw-Hartridge school in Edison, New Jersey
- Ward Law, hill with a Roman fort, near Shearington, Dumfries & Galloway
- Wardlaw Museum, located in, St Andrews, Scotland
- Pitreavie Castle, bought by Henry Wardlaw in 1608.
- Lochore Castle, one of the earliest Wardlaw places.
