= RAF Pitreavie Castle =

Former Royal Air Force headquarters in Fife, Scotland

RAF Pitreavie Castle
- Dunfermline, Fife in Scotland
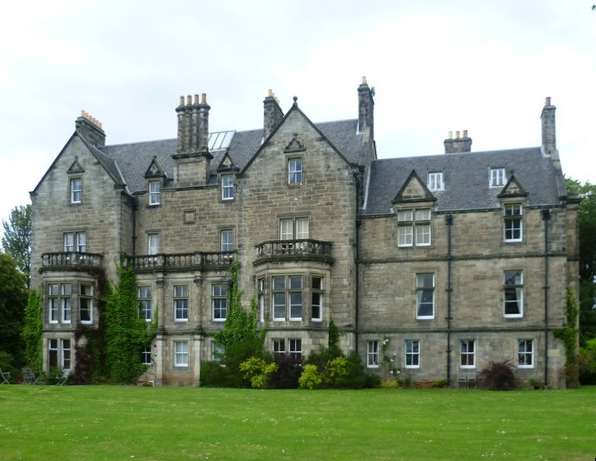
- Pitreavie Castle in 2011

Site information
- Type: RAF administrative station
- Owner: Ministry of Defence
- Operator: Royal Air Force
- Condition: Closed

Location
- Location in Fife Pitreavie Castle (the United Kingdom)
- Coordinates: 56°2′54.32″N 3°25′1.04″W

Site history
- Built: 1938
- In use: 1938–1996
- Fate: Main building converted to residential use, others demolished.

Listed Building – Category A
- Official name: Off Queensferry Road, Pitreavie Castle
- Designated: 12 January 1971
- Reference no.: LB26058

Royal Air Force Pitreavie Castle or RAF Pitreavie Castle was a station of the Royal Air Force located at Pitreavie Castle in Dunfermline and near Rosyth, Fife, Scotland.

Built in the early 17th century, the castle was sold to the Air Ministry in 1938. An underground bunker was constructed and the station was used to coordinate the operations of RAF Coastal Command and the Royal Navy during the Second World War.

The station was subsequently used as a UK and NATO maritime headquarters before closing in 1996. It is now in residential use.

== History ==
=== Pre-military use ===
Pitreavie Castle is thought to have been built by Sir Henry Wardlaw, the 1st Baronet of Pitreavie, who bought the Pitreavie estate in 1608, with the castle believed to have existed by 1614. It was sold to Archibald Primrose, 1st Earl of Rosebery, in 1703, and then to Sir Robert Blackwood, Lord Dean of Guild, and later Lord Provost, of Edinburgh, in 1711. It remained in the Blackwood family for 170 years, but was unoccupied for almost a century. The castle was bought by Henry Beveridge, a wealthy mill owner, in 1884. It was extensively extended and altered in 1885.

=== Establishment ===
Before the outbreak of the Second World War, the Works Department of the Air Ministry was looking for a site to accommodate the headquarters of newly reformed No. 18 (Reconnaissance) Group, part of RAF Coastal Command. In 1938, Pitreavie Castle was found and purchased for £12,306. The building, which was in a dilapidated state, was considered suitable due to the room available for expansion in its large grounds and its close proximity to the Royal Navy base at Rosyth. In 1939, the Admiralty made it known to the RAF that it was interested in co-locating at Pitreavie and creating a joint RAF/Royal Navy Area Combined Headquarters (ACHQ), to which the RAF were agreeable.

In order to protect the important headquarters from potential aerial attack should war break out, work began on an subterranean bunker within the grounds, located to the south-west of the main building. It comprised a two-storey bunker, square in shape, buried 20 feet (6.1 m) underground. It featured two entrances, one for the RAF, leading to an external entrance beside the main building and one leading to the newly built above ground Royal Navy block to the west. It was completed in 1941.

=== Second World War ===
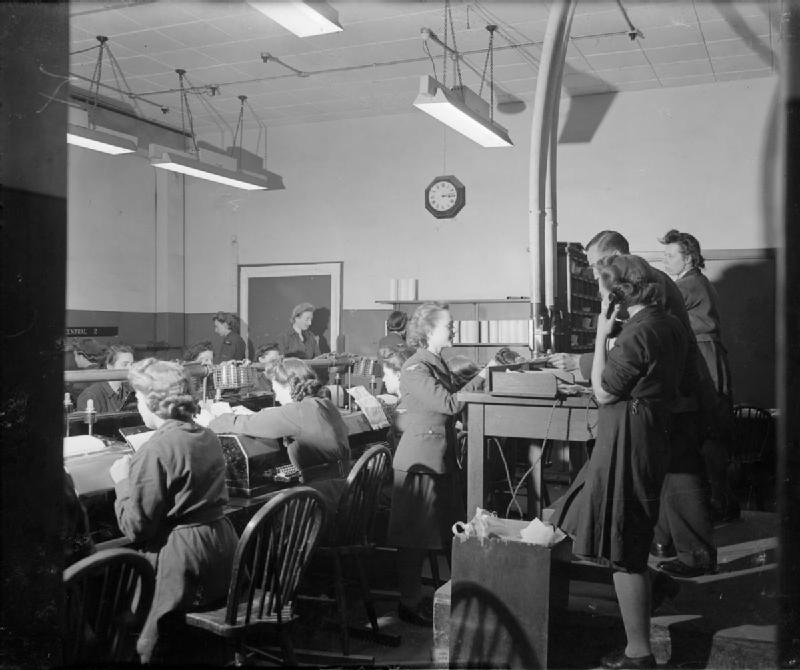
WAAF teleprinter operators at work in the signals centre at RAF Pitreavie Castle during the Second World War.

The site became home to the No. 18 Group headquarters, which had responsibility for maritime air operations north of Flamborough Head in Yorkshire, including the areas north and west of Scotland. The Navy's Commander-in-Chief, Rosyth was responsible for naval operations north of Flamborough Head to Wick in Caithness. The site featured a joint Officers' Mess and a steading to the east of the main building was used as a Sergeants' Mess. Towards the end of Second World War, three wooden huts were located to the east of the main building and used to accommodate officers, non-commissioned Officers and other ranks and ratings. The huts were believed to have dated from the First World War and had been relocated from RAF Donibristle, approximately 2.7 km (1.68 mi) away at Dalgety Bay.

During the war, No. 18 Group had responsibility for more than twenty squadrons and controlled aircraft predominately involved in anti-shipping and anti-submarine warfare in the seas around Scotland. The Prime Minister Winston Churchill, visited Pitreavie Castle twice during the war.

=== Cold War ===
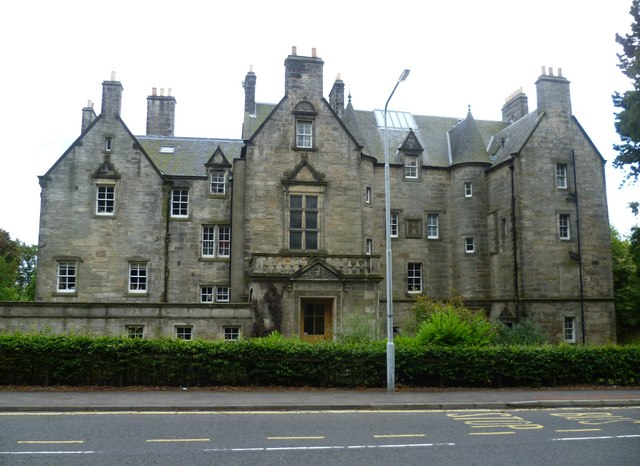
Pitreavie Castle in 2011

After the end of the Second World War in 1945, Pitreavie Castle's peacetime role continued to be maritime coordination. However, Flag Officer Rosyth transitioned into the Flag Officer Scotland and Northern Ireland position.

During the Cold War, Pitreavie Castle had several administrative and command roles.

On the formation of the NATO alliance in April 1949, both the Flag Officer Scotland and Northern Ireland and Air Officer Commanding 18 Group took on second, additional, NATO command roles. An associated Royal Naval Reserve unit was commissioned in 1957, later being named HMS Scotia in 1960. Initially based in the Maritime Headquarters, it was relocated to an above ground building in 1962.

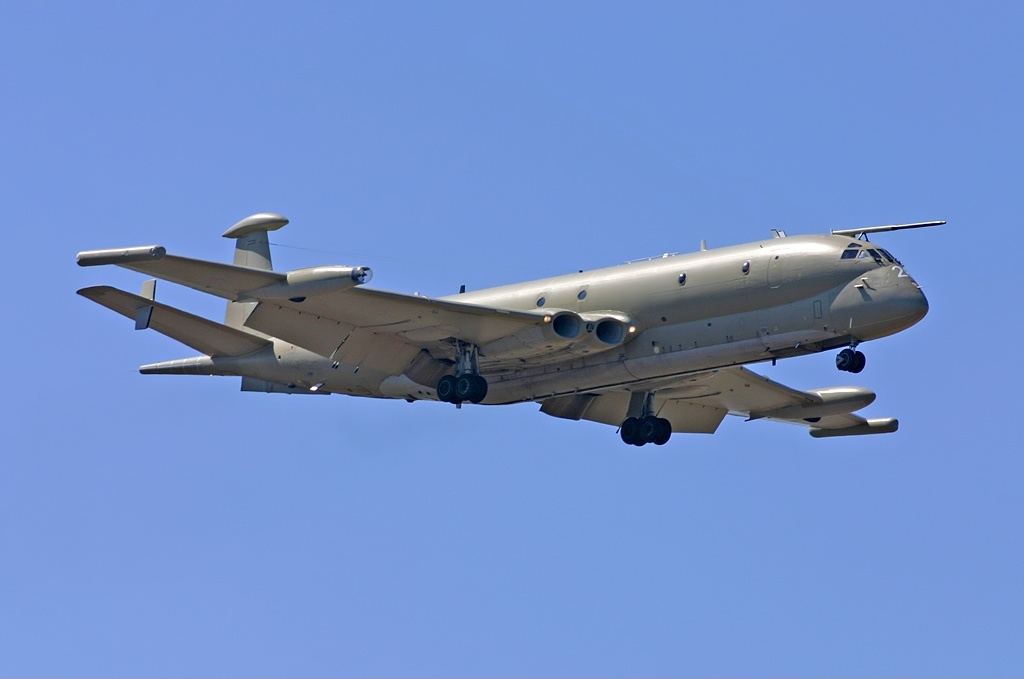
Maritime patrol aircraft such as the Hawker Siddeley Nimrod MR2 were commanded from RAF Pitreavie Castle.

In 1963, following a review of Royal Navy and RAF headquarters sites, the bunker was rearranged and enlarged. After Commander-in-Chief Fleet (CINCFLEET) Headquarters based at Northwood Headquarters (HMS Warrior) in Hertfordshire, Pitreavie became the second most important naval headquarters in the UK, as FOSNI had a war role under CINCFLEET. The castle however remained as a joint Royal Navy/RAF operation.

On 28 November 1969, No. 18 Group RAF, part of RAF Coastal Command, stationed at Pitreavie Castle, was disestablished by being redesignated Northern Maritime Air Region. From that point onwards AOC Northern Maritime Air Region appears to have also had the responsibility of Air Officer Scotland and Northern Ireland (AOSNI). FOSNI had command and control of Royal Navy warships and auxiliary vessels (apart from submarines) and in the seas around Scotland, Northern Ireland and Northern England. AOC Northern Maritime Air Region directed RAF maritime patrol aircraft (MPA), any allocated attack aircraft, and helicopters. Peacetime operations would include training exercises and routine patrols. The station was often used as the base for coordinating Joint Maritime Course exercises. Had war broken out with the Soviet Union, the station would have taken command and control of NATO vessels and MPA in its allocated areas.

Among Air Officers Commanding Northern Maritime Air Region was then-Air Vice Marshal Thomas Kennedy.

Pitreavie could also, if required, take over the functions of Northwood Headquarters. In these circumstances Pitreavie would take on a wider area of responsibility, have increased contact with politicians, co-ordinate submarines, and after 1970, control Polaris, the UK's strategic nuclear deterrent.

During the mid-1970s the number of Royal Navy personnel increased whereas the level of RAF personnel reduced. A limited number of married quarters were provided at Pitreavie, however most personnel were accommodated at Rosyth Dockyard (HMS Cochrane) or RAF Turnhouse near Edinburgh.

==== Administration ====
The station was home to the administrative offices of the senior Royal Navy and RAF officers in Scotland. Flag Officer Scotland and Northern Ireland (FOSNI) had offices in A-block and AOSNI had offices in the main castle building.

==== Rescue Co-ordination Centre ====
The Search and Rescue (SAR) cell, known as Rescue Co-ordination Centre (RCC) Edinburgh, controlled Royal Navy and RAF aircraft taking part in rescues over both land and sea in Scotland, Northern Ireland and most of England.

=== Draw-down and closure ===
During the early 1990s, RAF Pitreavie Castle's future looked secure with plans announced in July 1993 to locate a combined national Rescue Co-ordination Centre (RCC) at the site. The combined RCC would have coordinated all military aircraft involved in military and civilian search and rescue operations in the UK. The plans would have seen the closure of the UK's other RCC, which was located at Mount Wise in Plymouth. The national RCC was expected to be operational by the end of 1994.

However, Frontline First: The Defence Costs Study, published by the Ministry of Defence in July 1994, recommended various changes to the structure of the British military and the defence estate. The study resulted in Pitreavie's roles being relocated and the station proposed for closure. The creation of the national RCC at Pitreavie was cancelled, with a new home for it proposed at RAF Leuchars, also in Fife. In the event, the national RCC was established in 1997 at RAF Kinloss in Moray and became known as the Aeronautical Rescue Coordination Centre (ARCC).

In December 1995, the office of the Air Officer Scotland and Northern Ireland moved from Pitreavie Castle to RAF Leuchars. Flag Officer Scotland Northern England and Northern Ireland moved to Faslane (HMNB Cylde).

RAF Pitreavie Castle closed on 31 January 1996. The closure of the station was expected to save £22 million over 10 years.

=== Post-military use ===
After the closure of the station the castle and former steading buildings were converted to residential use. Other buildings were demolished and the bunker sealed up, with all surface elements removed.

== See also ==
- List of former Royal Air Force stations
- HMS Scotia (shore establishment)
