= Wardlow =

Wardlow may refer to:

- Wardlow, Alberta, a hamlet in Canada
- Wardlow, Derbyshire, a parish and village in the Derbyshire Dales, England
- Wardlow Quarry, a limestone quarry on the Weaver Hills, Staffordshire, England, UK
- Wardlow station, a LACMTA train station in Long Beach, California, U.S.

== Persons with the surname ==
- Dennis Wardlow (born 1954), American politician from Florida; Prime Minister of the micronation Conch Republic
- Gayle Dean Wardlow (born 1940), American historian of the blues
- Lynn Wardlow (born 1943), American politician from Minnesota
- Wardlow (wrestler), mononymous ring name of American professional wrestler Michael Wardlow

== See also ==
- Wardlow Mires, a parish and village in the Derbyshire Dales, England
- Illinois v. Wardlow, a 2000 U.S. Supreme Court case regarding searches and seizures
- Wardlaw, a Scottish surname
