= Entry of Mary, Queen of Scots, into Edinburgh =

1561 royal entry celebration for Mary, Queen of Scots in Edinburgh

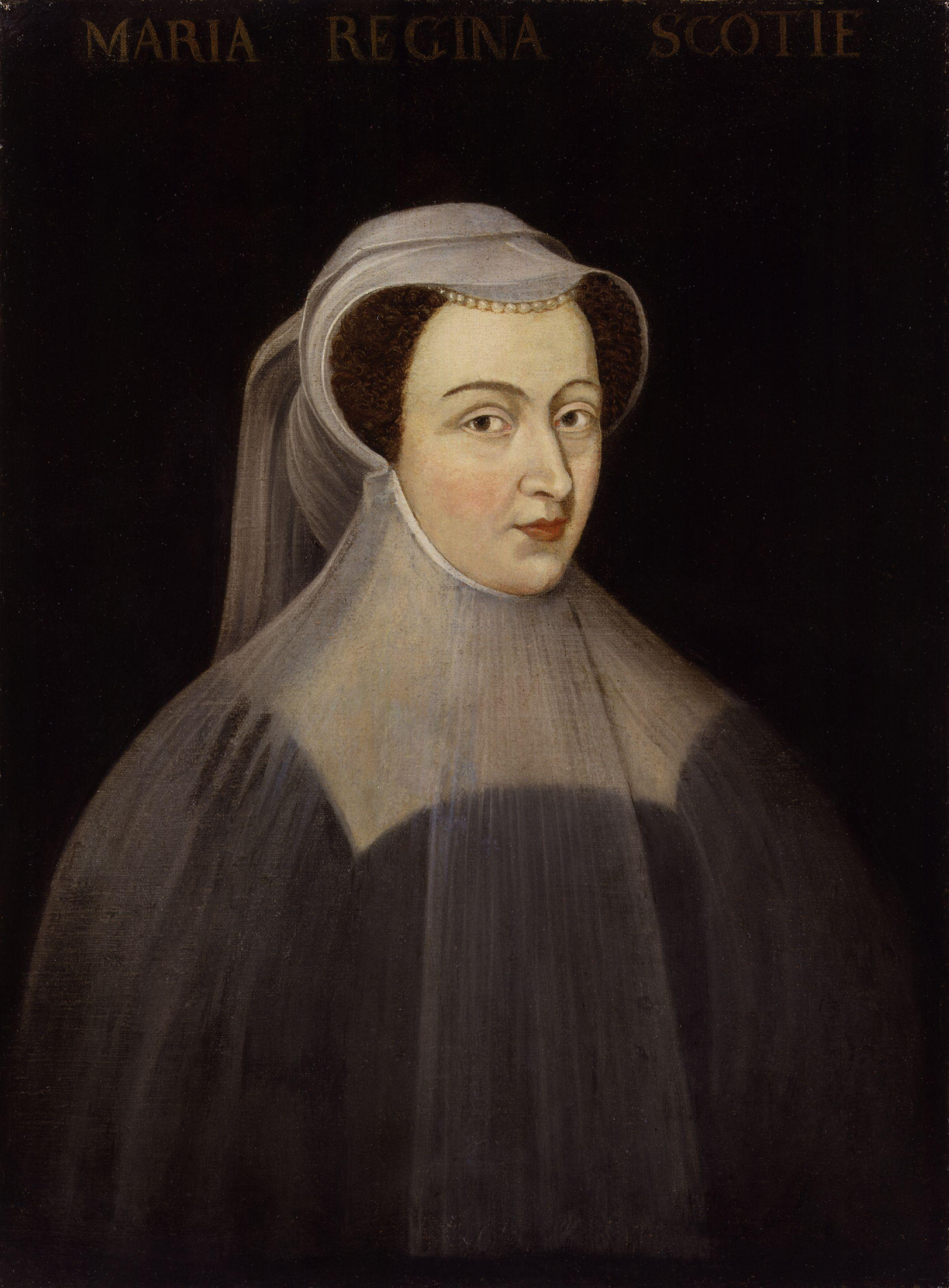
Mary in mourning dress in a copy of a 1560 painting

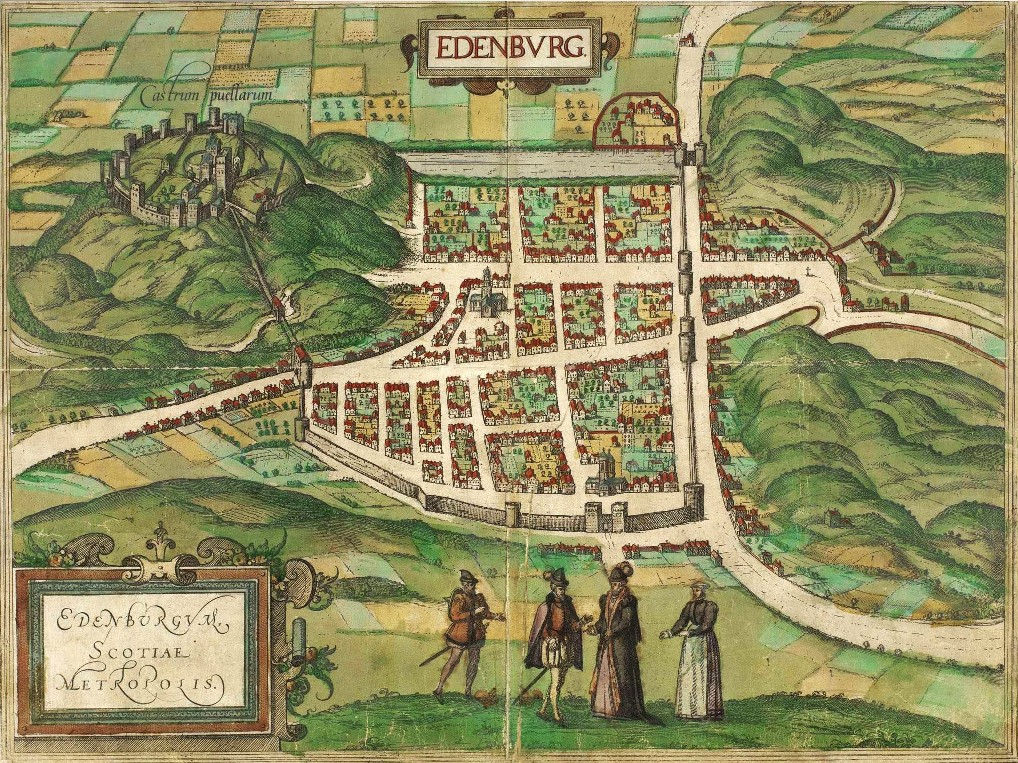
Map of Edinburgh c. 1581.

On 19 August 1561, the 18-year-old Mary, Queen of Scots, returned to Scotland from France following the death of her husband Francis II of France the previous winter. On 2 September the town of Edinburgh organised a celebration of royal entry for her.

== Events ==
Tailors and "boys" made black mourning "dule" riding cloaks and skirts for Mary, Queen of Scots, and her 15 ladies. Mary wore black Florence serge, the other costumes were made from 50 ells of cheaper black stemming. The treasurer of burgh council, Luke Wilson, bought costumes for the citizen participants.

On the day, Mary rode from Holyrood Palace to Edinburgh Castle where she had dinner. After the meal, she went to the Castlehill on the High Street and joined an escort of 50 young men from Edinburgh who were dressed as "Moors", a disguise representing imagined African people, with rings in their mouths and gilded chains about their necks and arms. The costumes of some of this "Convoy of Moors" were made of white and yellow taffeta. A 16th-century chronicle called the Diurnal of Occurents describes their costume, black face, and chains in Scots language:

thair bodeis and theis [thighs] coverit with yeallow taffiteis, thair armis and leggs from the knee doun bare, cullorit with blak, in maner of Moris, upon thair heidds blak hattis, and on thair faces blak visouris, in thair mowthis rings, garnessit with intellable [set with innumerable] precious staneis, about thair nekkis leggs and armes infynit of chenis of gold.

Mary made her progress under a "paill" or canopy of purple velvet with gold fringes held up by twelve townsmen dressed in black velvet. At the Butter Tron (where dairy products were weighed for sale) at the head of the West Bow there was a pageant stage. A boy dressed as an angel emerged from a globe and gave her the keys to the town, a bible, and a psalter. At the Tolbooth, on a double stage, four damsels (male actors) represented Fortitude, Justice, Temperance, and Prudence. At the Cross, wine poured from a fountain, and four maidens performed an allegory. At another stop at the Salt Tron a pageant representing the Scottish Reformation was abandoned in favour of the destruction of Korah, Dathan, and Abiram.

At the Netherbow, the boundary between Edinburgh and the Canongate, the queen was addressed by a dragon which was then burnt. At Holyrood Palace, a cartload of school children spoke in favour of the Reformation and sang a psalm. A cupboard of gilt plate, bought by the town council from the Earl of Morton and Richard Maitland of Lethington, was presented to the queen in her outer chamber in Holyrood Palace, by the "honest men" who had carried and walked beside the canopy.

== Negotiated meaning and controversy ==
A Royal Entry was a negotiation and affirmation of the values and meanings of a city and the royal court. The chronicle known as the Diurnal of Occurrents mentions that Mary's mother Mary of Guise had made her ceremonial royal entry to Edinburgh on Saint Margaret's Day (16 November 1538), "with great sports played to her grace through all parts of the town". Guise, according to the Diurnal, entered the town at the West Port gate and progressed down the High Street or Royal Mile to Holyrood Palace.

Some aspects of the 1561 Entry were controversial. The English diplomat Thomas Randolph mentioned the substitution and negotiation of content alluding directly to the Scottish Reformation. John Knox wrote that Mary seemed dismissive when she was presented with the Bible in vernacular, and this is repeated in a chronicle attributed to the Catholic Lord Herries. It is thought that the presentation of the triumph of the Reformation during the Entry was displeasing to the Catholic queen. A month later, after burgh council elections, she required the dismissal of the Provost and four bailies of the town council. The new Provost, Thomas McCalzean, proved to be a supporter of the queen.

Mary's Entry included features differing from other Edinburgh Entries, with no mention of a ceremony at the West Port, an actual entry to the town, and the presentation of the gilt plate within the royal palace. These differences may suggest interventions in the theatrical programme and conflict between civic and royal authority.

== Burgh records ==
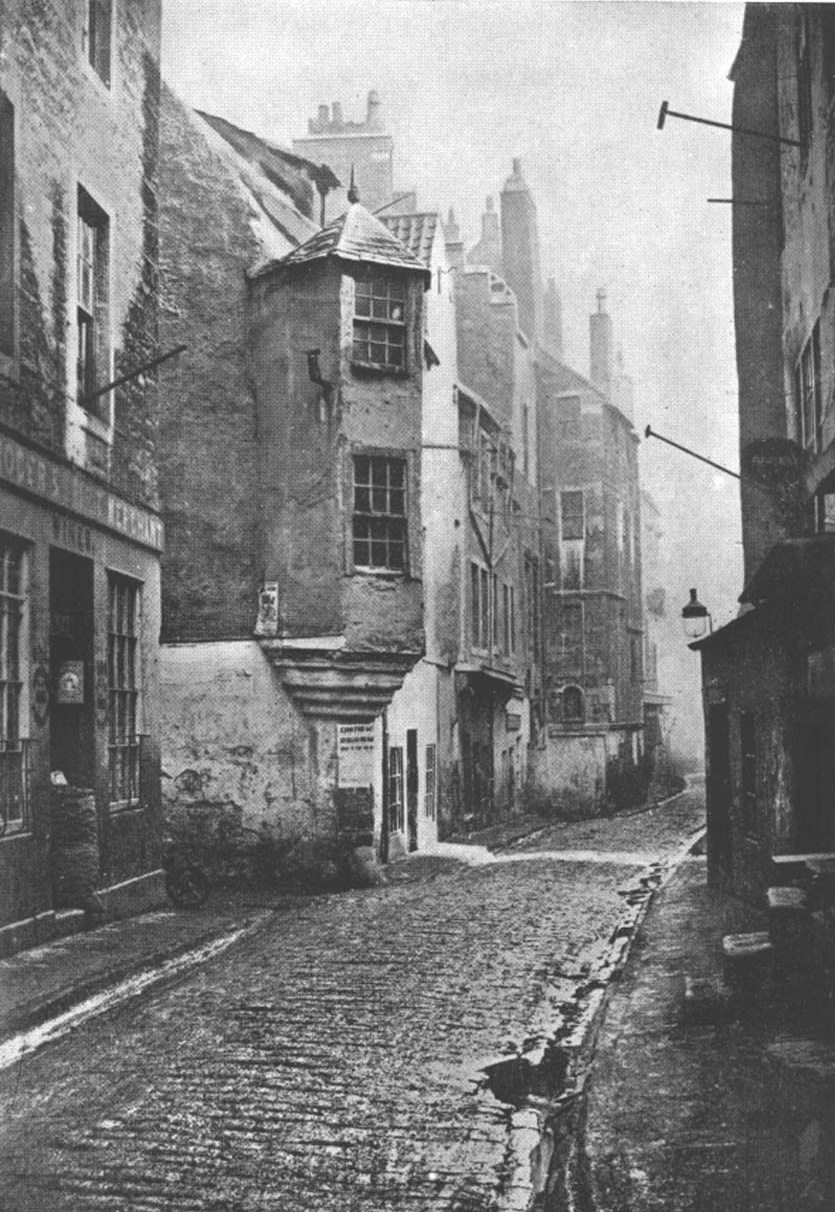
The first event put on for Mary, Queen of Scots was a banquet in the former lodging of Cardinal Beaton at the corner of the Cowgate and Blackfriar's Wynd

The town council had met on 26 August and resolved to hold a banquet for the queen and her cousins, and a "triumph" of "her grace's entry within this town". The Provost of Edinburgh, Archibald Douglas of Kilspindie, discussed methods of funding the event, countering objections raised by the goldsmith Thomas Ewyn who spoke on behalf of the town's craftsmen. The treasurer, Luke Wilson, was appointed to organise the banquet and the "triumph". Wilson also supplied the costumes for the men bearing the canopy and town's sergeants. A carpenter Patrick Schang made the stages for the "triumphs and farces" at the Over or Butter Tron, Tolbooth, Cross, Salt Tron, and Netherbow. The stages were painted by Walter Binning. The young men (playing the "Moors") were expected to devise their own costumes to wear while they made "convoy before the cart triumphant". The banquet was held in Cardinal Beaton's house in the Cowgate.

== Verses ==
The verses spoken when the boy appeared out of a globe to give gifts of books to the queen survive. The English diplomat Thomas Randolph sent a copy to William Cecil. According to John Knox, Mary smiled at verses in her praise but passed the Bible to her attendant Arthur Erskine of Blackgrange.

Welcome our Souveraine Welcome our natyve quene
Welcome to us your subjects greate and smalle
Welcome I saye even from the verie spleene
to Edinburghe youre cyttie principall
dothe heere offer to your excellence
two proper volumes in memoriall
as gyftes most gainand for a godlie prince

Wherein your grace may read and understand
the perfyct waye unto the heavens hie
and how to rewle your subjects and your land
and how your kingdom established salbe
Judgement and wysedome herein shall you see
here shall you find that God hes done command
and who the contrarie does wilfullie
how them he thretines with his scurge and wand

Ane gyfte more precious could we none present
nor yet more nedefull for your excellence
quhilk (which) is Gods law his word his testament
trewlie translated with faithful diligence
quhilk to accept with humble reverence
the Provost present moste hartelie yow exhorts
with the (w)hole subjects due obedience
together with the keyse of their ports

In sign that they and all that they possess
bodie and goods shall ever reddie be
to serve you as thair souveraigne hie misteris
both daye and ever after their bound deutie
beseching your grace in this necessetie
their shorte tyme & gudwill consither
accept their hearts & take it patiently
that may done seeing all is yours together.

== Civic and court drama in Scotland ==
The events staged at the Edinburgh Entry were closely paralleled in other festivals, including:

- The 1503 Entry of Margaret Tudor.
- The 1579 Entry of James VI into Edinburgh
- The 1590 Entry and coronation of Anne of Denmark. Further detail from this event is available for the performance of the "Convoy of the Moors".

Royal baptisms also included elements of masque, drama, and formal processions:

- The 1566 Baptism of James VI
- The 1594 Masque at the baptism of Prince Henry
