= In the Footsteps of Kings =

In the Footsteps of Kings is an Augmented reality App aimed at visitors in Fife. In the Footsteps of Kings follows Jess the Jester around 9 sites in the Mid-Fife area and gives visitors of all ages the opportunity to interact with characters and take part in a number of fun activities tailored to each of the nine locations. The app was created by AliveLab/Mardles and the project was led by Fife Tourism Partnership with funding from Scottish Enterprise.

Sites launched in phase 1 were Markinch Church, Ravenscraig Castle, Lochore Castle, Falkland Palace, Falkland Estate and Aberdour Castle.

A further 3 sites were launched in November 2019 at Dunfermline's Carnegie Library & Galleires, Burntisland Seafront and MacDuffs Castle in East Wemyss. The app is free to download to smartphones from the App Store, Google Play and Amazon Apps.

In November 2019, the app won a national award for innovation at Family Attractions Expo in Birmingham.
