= Octavians =

Scottish administrators

The Octavians were a financial commission of eight in the government of Scotland first appointed by James VI on 9 January 1596.

== Origins ==
James VI's minister John Maitland, 1st Lord Maitland of Thirlestane died on 3 October 1595, and his financial situation was troubled.

The Octavians were in part drawn from a committee appointed in 1593 by the Parliament of Scotland to look after the estates of Anne of Denmark. Around this time, King James had difficult financing the two royal households, and years later, he wrote that Alexander Seton joked that his "house could not be kept upon epigrams", meaning that fine words alone would not raise money.

An English courtier in Scotland Roger Aston described events at the end of December 1595 in a letter to James Hudson: "The queen's council joins with the prior (Alexander Seton) and other of the king's council for the reformation of the king's particular affairs". James Melville of Halhill, a courtier associated with the household of Anne of Denmark described the appointment of the Octavians in a letter to the Danish diplomat Christian Barnekow.

The committee for the queen's estates continued after the Union of Crowns, and new appointments were made in April 1617.

== The administration ==
It was said that at the end of December 1595, the Queen's council, newly appointed as the Octavians, gave Anne of Denmark a purse of gold which she then presented to the king as a New Year's Day gift. The details of this incident are obscure. The Octavians made particular efforts to reduce the cost of the royal households of James VI and Anne of Denmark. The chamberlain, the Duke of Lennox, and the Master Households, were encouraged to reduce the number of courtiers who received fees and meals at court, and as many as 70 posts were trimmed.

The Octavians were a reforming body, eager to bring order to the royal finances and bear down on patronage. They imposed a 5% import tax and promoted an expedition into the Highlands to recover tax revenue. The Octavians appointed Henry Wardlaw of Pitreavie as Receiver General, responsible for the income from the Comptrollery, the New Augmentations (duties paid from former church lands), and the Mint.

The initial commission for the Octavians lasted only one year, and was much disliked. Presbyterians attempted a coup on 17 December 1596. One demand was that the Octavians should be disbanded. James VI was in the Tolbooth of Edinburgh with most of the Privy Council and the Octavians. After a sermon given by Walter Balcanquhall in St Giles, the congregation came out crying "the sword of Gideon" and some rioters called for arms. The royal guard escorted James VI back to Holyroodhouse.

When their commission was renewed in 1597, they faced disabling opposition from vested interests, and some of the Octavians were suspect as sympathetic to Catholics. But the concept of the commission as an extension of the exchequer into government persisted, and under the name of New Octavians it played a part in Scottish administration into the reign of Charles I.

== Octavians of 1596 ==
- David Carnegie of Colluthie
- James Elphinstone, 1st Lord Balmerinoch, formerly a member of the queen's council.
- Thomas Hamilton, 1st Earl of Haddington, formerly a member of the queen's council.
- John Lindsay of Balcarres, formerly a member of the queen's council.
- Alexander Seton, 1st Earl of Dunfermline, formerly a member of the queen's council.
- Sir John Skene
- Walter Stewart, 1st Lord Blantyre
- Peter Young of Seton

== New Octavians of 1611 ==
- Thomas Hamilton, 1st Earl of Haddington
- Gideon Murray, Lord Elibank
- John Preston, Lord Fentonbarns
- Alexander Seton, 1st Earl of Dunfermline
- John Spottiswoode

John Preston of Fentonbarns was already involved in crown finance. A letter from James VI of June 1599 mentions that he had instructed him to repay a sum of money advanced on the security of some of the jewels of Anne of Denmark to the goldsmith and financier George Heriot. Preston however, had reserved the money for the costs of an embassy to France.
