= Maiden (guillotine) =

Execution device

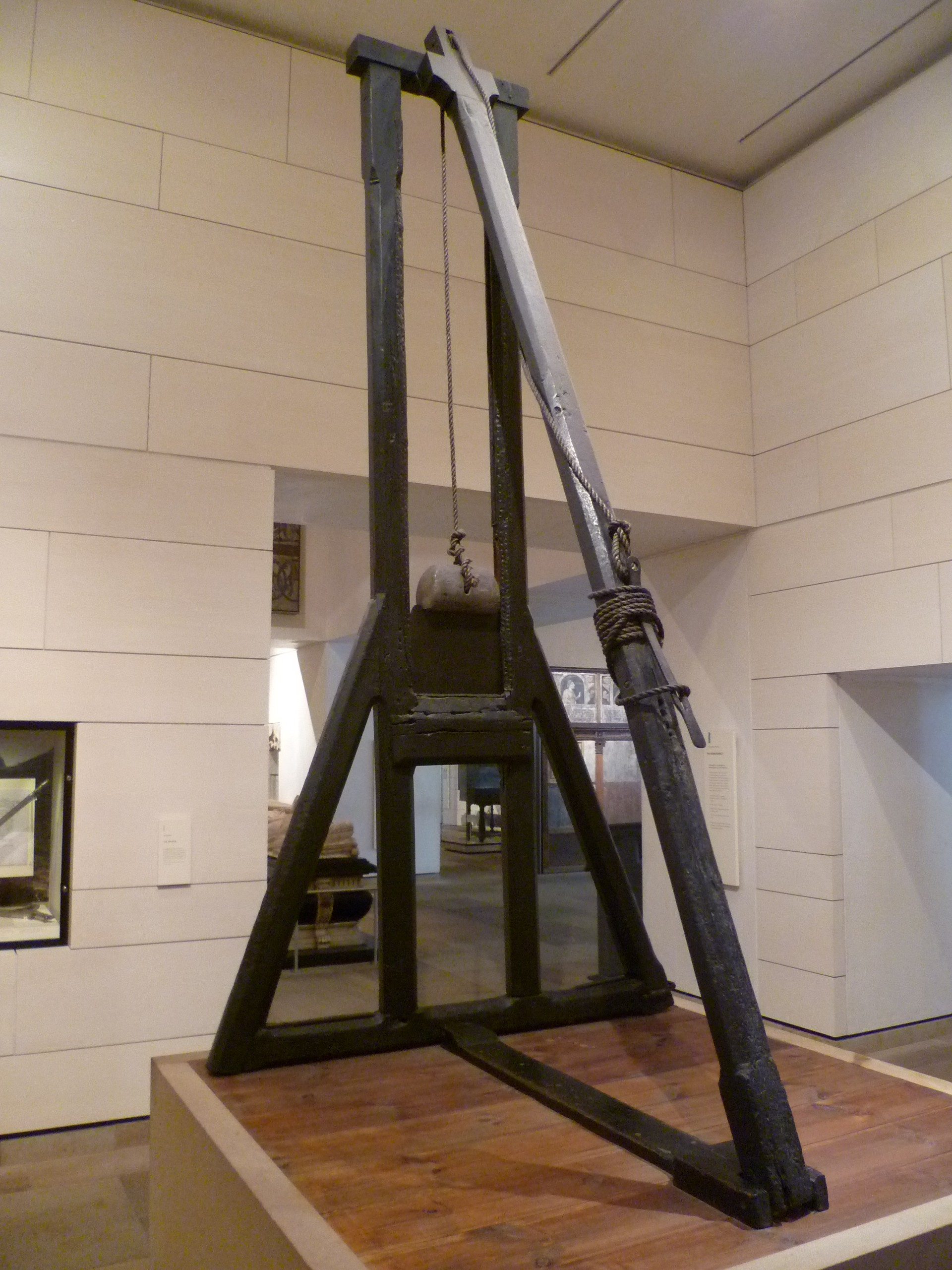
'The Maiden' on display at the National Museum of Scotland, Edinburgh (July 2011)

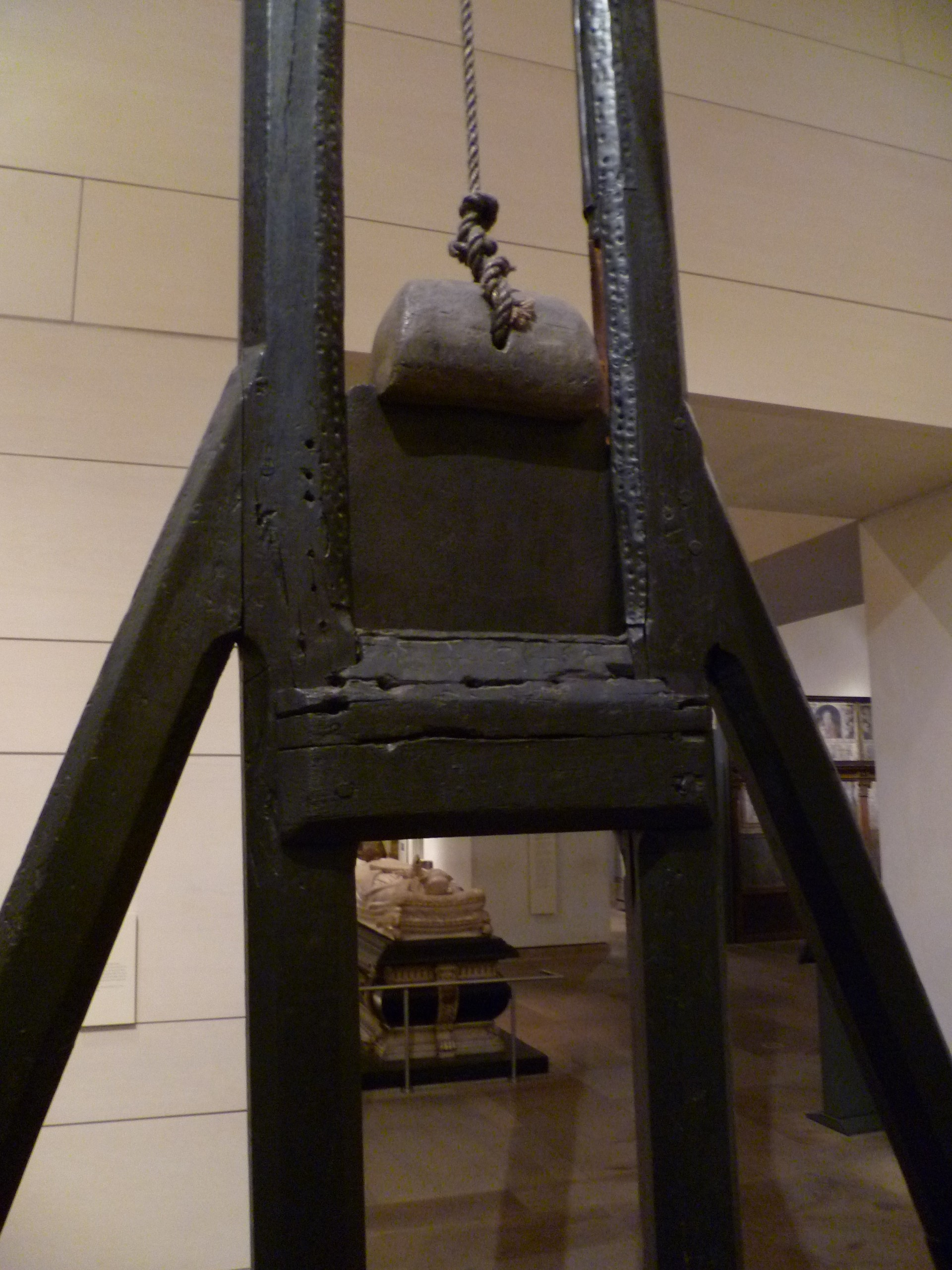
Blade of The Maiden

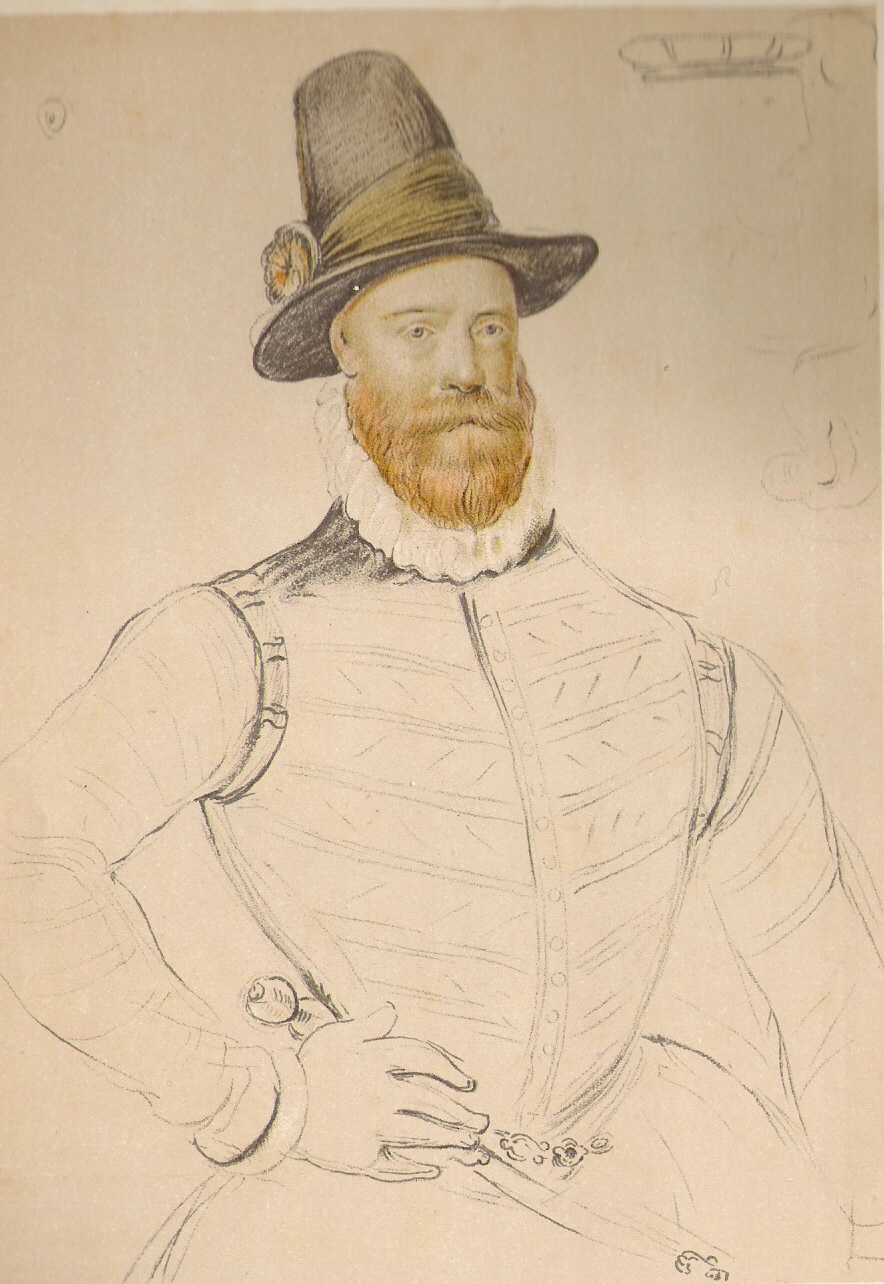
James Douglas, 4th Earl of Morton

The Maiden (also known as the Scottish Maiden) is an early form of guillotine, or gibbet, that was used between the 16th and 18th centuries as a means of execution in Edinburgh, Scotland. The device was introduced in 1564 during the reign of Mary Queen of Scots, and was last used in 1716. It long predates the use of the guillotine during the French Revolution.

Manufactured in Edinburgh, the Maiden is built of oak, with a lead weight and iron blade. It is displayed at the National Museum of Scotland in Edinburgh.

== History ==
Beheading machines were not a new idea: a European example is shown in a 1539 illustration by Lucas Cranach the Elder.

By 1563, the sword used for executions in Edinburgh was worn out, and in February of that year funds were used to pay for the loan of a sword for a beheading. After this, the Maiden was constructed to an order from the Provost and Magistrates of Edinburgh in 1564, during the reign of Mary, Queen of Scots, and the records of the construction of the Maiden survive. The accounts reveal that it was made by the carpenters Adam and Patrick Schang and George Tod. Andrew Gotterson added the lead weight to the blade. Patrick Schang was paid two pounds for his 'whole labours and devising of the timber work'. Schang also made furniture in Edinburgh, including an oak bed for Queen Mary's half-brother, the Earl of Moray.

The first execution on record was that of Thomas Scott of Cambusmichael, on 3 April 1565/6. He had been a conspirator in the murder of David Rizzio. The accounts of the City Treasurer for this execution record payment for moving the components of the Maiden from Blackfriars to the town cross, assembling the machine and taking it down afterwards. The oak construction could be readily dismantled for storage, and moved to various locations: executions using it were carried out at the Mercat Cross, Edinburgh, (off the High Street), the Castlehill and the Grassmarket. The Maiden was lent to Leith in 1591 for the execution of William Gibsone, and the accounts show payment for "careing of the Maiden ther and hame agin".

During the minority of King James VI, the Regent James Douglas, 4th Earl of Morton was executed by the Maiden in 1581. David Hume of Godscroft's 1644 History of the House of Angus said that Morton was responsible for its introduction, and had based the concept on the Halifax Gibbet: "the Maiden, which he himself had caused make after the patterne which he had seen in Halifax in Yorkshire". Although there was no other support for this claim, later writers repeated the legend. A 1789 history of Halifax embellished it with the story that Morton "carried a model of it to his own country, where it remained so long unused, that it acquired the name of the Maiden."

From 1564 to 1716, more than 150 people were executed on the Maiden, after which it was withdrawn from use. Notable victims included Archibald Campbell, 1st Marquess of Argyll, in 1661, executed following the Restoration of Charles II, and his son Archibald Campbell, 9th Earl of Argyll, in 1685, executed for intending to lead a rebellion against James VII. These executions took place at the Mercat Cross in Edinburgh. The last execution that was performed upon the Maiden was that of John Hamilton on 30 June 1716, for the murder of a publican during a brawl.

The Maiden was stored away, and when rediscovered was put on display at the Museum of Antiquities, now the National Museum of Scotland.

== Mechanism ==
The person under sentence of death placed his or her head on a crossbar which is about 4 feet (1.2 m) from the bottom. Lead weights weighing around 75 pounds (34 kg) were attached to the axe blade. The blade is guided by grooves cut within the inner edges of the frame. A peg, which is in turn attached to a cord, kept the blade in place. The executioner removed the peg by pulling sharply on the cord, and this caused the blade to fall and decapitate the condemned. If the condemned had been tried for stealing a horse, the cord was attached to the animal which, on being whipped, started running away, removing the peg and thereby becoming the executioner.

== See also ==
- Decapitation
- List of people who were beheaded
- Capital punishment
