= Nor Loch =

Lake in Edinburgh, Scotland – drained in 1820

Coordinates: 55°57′N 3°12′W

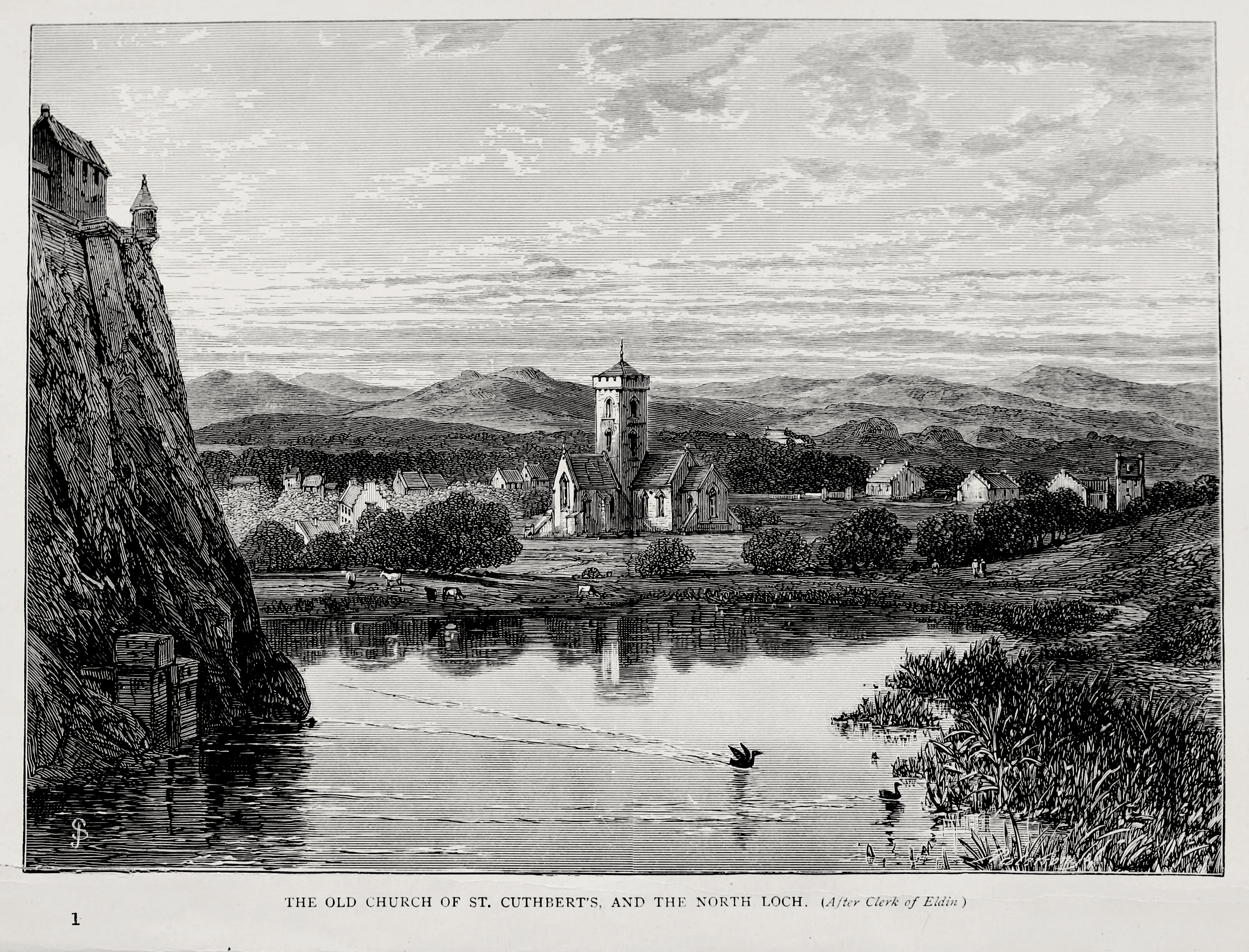
The Nor Loch c. 1750, looking towards St Cuthbert's

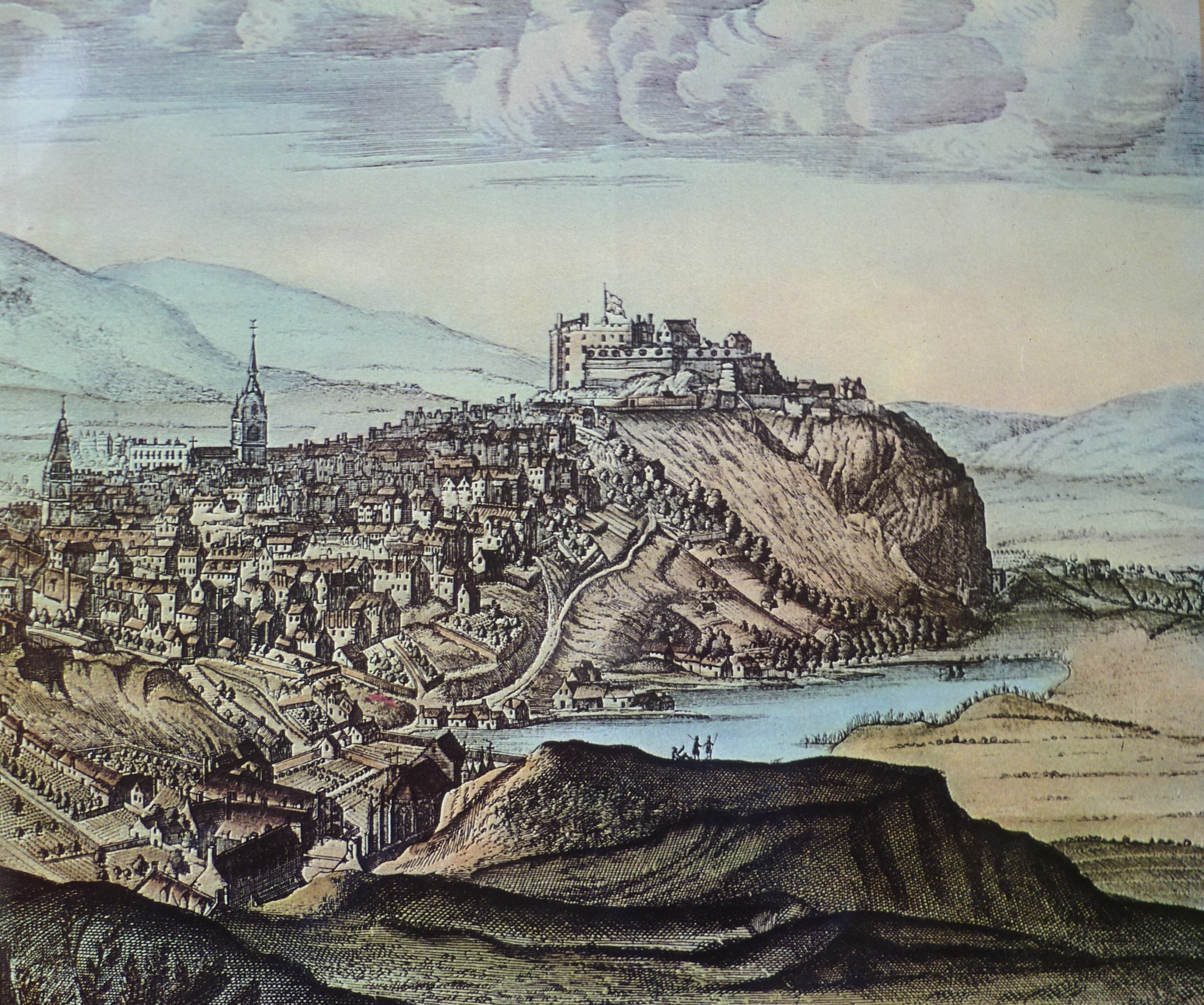
The Old Town with the Nor Loch in the foreground, c. 1690. Part of an engraving by John Slezer

The Nor Loch (also Nor' Loch or North Loch) was a man-made loch that formerly lay immediately north of Edinburgh's Old Town. Its site is now occupied by Princes Street Gardens and Waverley Station.

== Geological formation ==
The depression, along with the parallel one now occupied by the Cowgate, was formed by glacial erosion during the last Ice Age, when the icepack was forced to divide by the volcanic plug now known as Castle Rock.

== Early history ==
A marsh formed in the hollow and was part of the natural defence of the Old Town of Edinburgh.

In 1460, King James III ordered the hollow to be flooded in order to complete the defences of the town and Edinburgh Castle. The loch was formed by creating an earthen dam to block the progress of the Tummel Burn, a stream that ran along the foot of the north side of the castle rock. The water level was controlled by a sluice in the dam which was at the foot of Halkerston's Wynd.

Because the Old Town was built on a steep ridge, it expanded on an east-west axis, eastwards from the castle; expansion northward, as would happen with the later New Town, was extremely difficult at this point. The Nor Loch was thus a hindrance to both invaders and town growth.

On 22 May 1562, the burgh council decided to punish adulterers and "fornicatouris" by ducking them in the Nor Loch. Luke Wilson was involved in the project to renew a place for "dowkeing of the saidis fornicatouris". The record mentions a pulley for a rope.

In the winter of 1571, as part of a plan to end the "Lang Siege", the Earl of Morton explained that, "One side of the town is 'unwallit', and the frost may give occasion to assault it that way with far less difficulty than otherwise", suggesting that the requested English army could cross the frozen Loch.

In 1603, King James VI gave the Town Council title to the land, pools and marshes of the loch.

== Middle Ages to 19th century ==
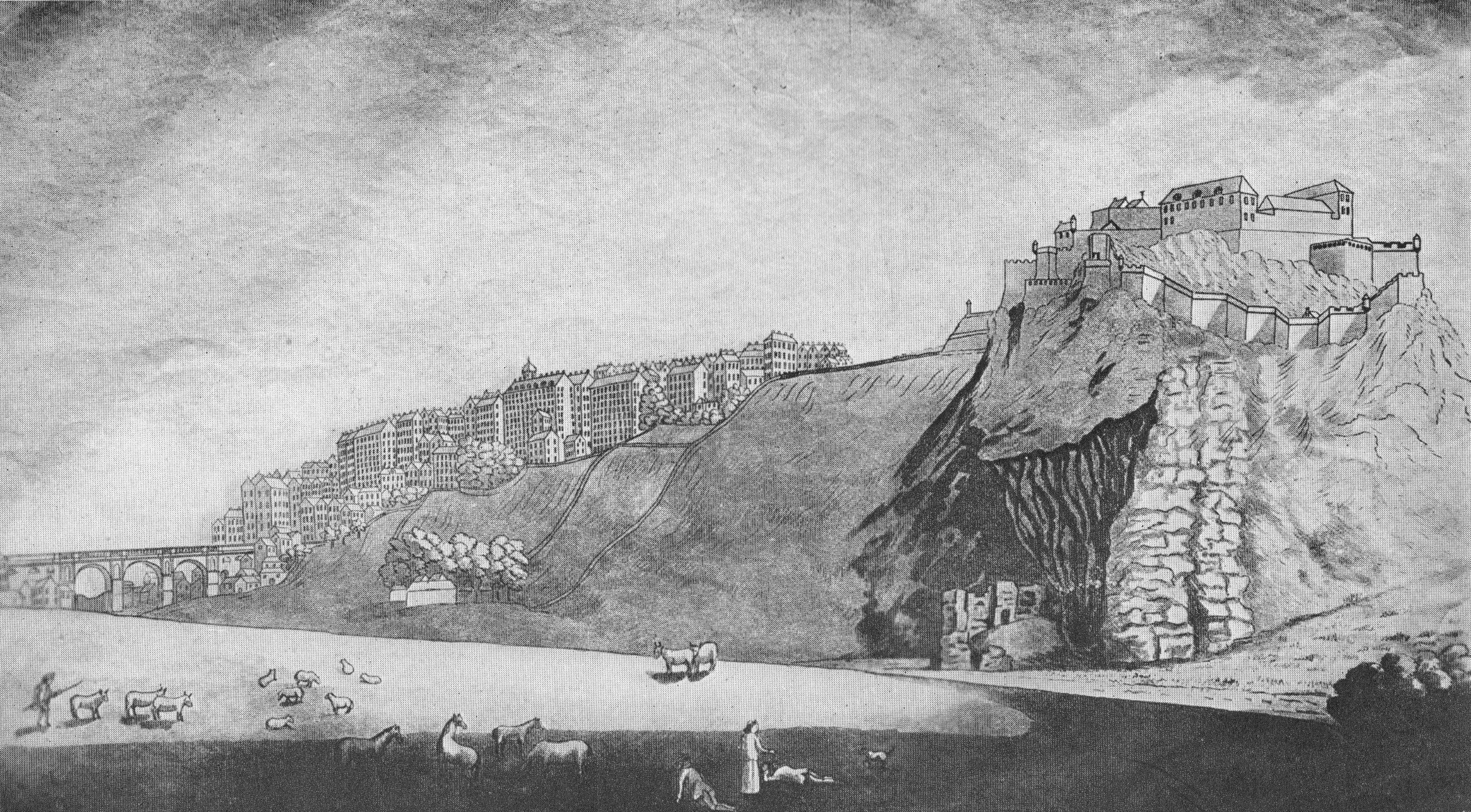
Site of the Nor Loch after draining, c. 1781

As the Old Town became ever more crowded during the Middle Ages, the Nor Loch became similarly polluted, by sewage, household waste, and general detritus thrown down the hillside. The loch was never used as drinking water but there were wells beside it (see below).

The Nor Loch fulfilled a variety of other roles during this period including:

- Defence: Edinburgh was repeatedly attacked by various factions from the Middle Ages to the 18th century, including during the Wars of Scottish Independence, Anglo-Scottish wars of the early modern period and the Jacobite risings. The Nor Loch provided an important defensive obstacle for any faction which was attempting to capture or defend Edinburgh.
- Suicides: The Nor Loch was a common spot for suicide attempts.
- Crime: The loch appears to have been used as a smuggling route.
- Punishment: From 1562, offenders were ducked in the Nor Loch. There is little evidence that 'witch ducking' was utilised as a means of identifying witches in Scottish witchcraft trials. 'Witch ducking' or 'the swimming test' was employed in some areas of Europe as a method of identifying whether or not a suspect was guilty of witchcraft.

However, in 1685, the law of Scotland outlawed drowning as a form of execution. Before then many lives were taken. On one day in 1624, eleven women were drowned. Four years later, George Sinclair confessed to committing incest with his two sisters. All three were sentenced to death, but it was said that the clergy commuted the sentence on the younger sister. Sinclair and his older sister were placed in a large chest with holes drilled in it and thrown into the loch to drown. Two centuries later, in 1820, the chest was rediscovered by workmen digging a drain near the Wellhouse Tower of the Castle. James Skene of Rubislaw, who was present at the work in the gardens, reported that the skeleton of a tall man was found between those of two women. Later 19th-century accounts report only two skeletons being found in the chest.

Draining of the Nor Loch began at the eastern end to allow construction of the North Bridge.

Draining of the western end was undertaken 1813 to 1820, under supervision by the engineer James Jardine to enable the creation of Princes Street Gardens. For several decades after draining of the Loch began, townspeople continued to refer to the area as the Nor Loch.

== The Wellhouse Tower ==
The Nor Loch was never a source of drinking water, and indeed was probably highly polluted, being largely stagnant and used as a dumping ground for rubbish over and above being the termination point of many of the Old Town's open sewers. However, there was a drinking water source at its edge. The wellhouse tower was built in 1362 and had two functions: bridging the small gap in the city fortifications between Edinburgh Castle and the Nor Loch; and protecting and covering a well going down to natural ground water level below the loch.

The two storey structure was a drinking water source for the castle. It had timber steps leading up the steep slope back to the castle but most water was taken up by crane. It was in ruins by the seventeenth century and little remains today.

== 19th century ==
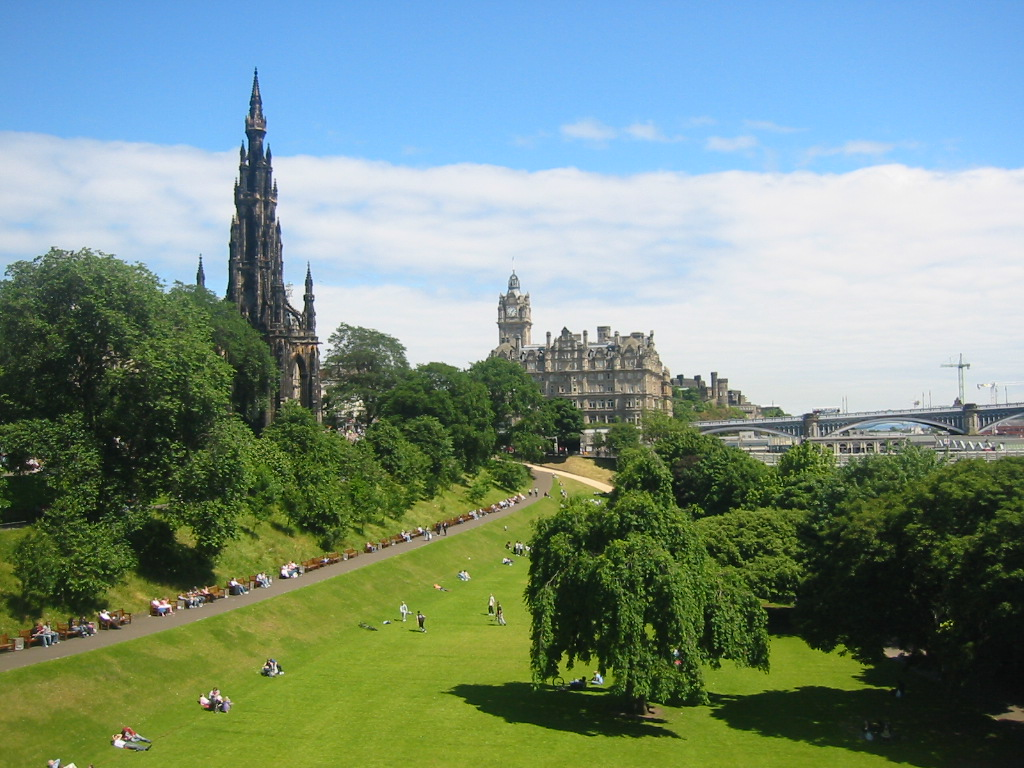
East Princes Street Gardens in 2005

Although the Nor Loch was drained during the 19th century, neither its legacy nor its name are entirely forgotten. During the construction of Waverley station and the railway lines through the area, a number of bones were uncovered.

Princes Street Gardens were created in the 1820s and now occupy much of the loch's former extent.

== Other lost lochs in Edinburgh ==
The Nor Loch is not the only "lost loch" in the city. Another example is Gogarloch in the South Gyle area. Like the Nor Loch, this was mostly marshland, rather than a true loch. It was reclaimed for a park, housing and to build the railway to the Forth Bridge.

The Meadows, a large open park immediately to the south of the city centre, was once the Burgh Loch, occasionally referred to as the South Loch. Its name is remembered in the street called Boroughloch.

Canonmills Loch once stretched from today's Dundas Street to Rodney Street.

Lochend Loch in Lochend Park and Duddingston Loch in Holyrood Park are the only remaining natural lochs in the city while St. Margaret's and Dunsapie Lochs, also in Holyrood Park, are artificial.
