= David Schang =

Scottish carpenter

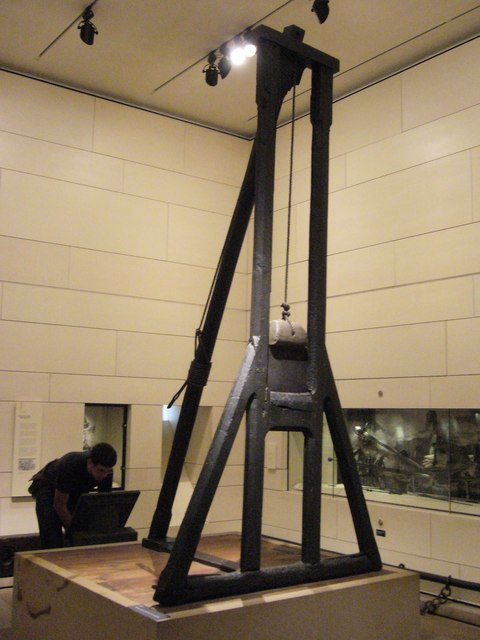
The Schang family made the Maiden

David Schang was a Scottish carpenter and fortune-teller working in 16th-century Edinburgh.

== Carpentry and the Schang family ==
Members of the Schang family were "wrights" or carpenters in Perth and Edinburgh, and the surname Schang frequently appears in the minutes of the Craft incorporations of both towns. An inventory of the household goods of Regent Moray includes a bed made by "one Schang". Before the Scottish Reformation, members of the Perth crafts paid for a banquet and a game of football when they were accepted as master craftsmen. The wrights and barbers maintained an altar dedicated to Our Lady of Pity in St John's Kirk.

In 1547 a wright in Perth called David Schang had a copy of the New Testament, and ownership of the book was disputed. Patrick Schang judged apprentice pieces or "assays" in Edinburgh in 1555 and 1575, with the French craftsman Andrew Mansioun.

Mary, Queen of Scots returned from France in September 1561. For Mary's formal Entry to Edinburgh stages and "triumphs" throughout the town were built by Patrick Schang and painted by Walter Binning.

David Schang, meanwhile, was put forward to join the burgh council of Edinburgh. On 24 September 1561, a goldsmith Thomas Ewyn presented candidates for election to the council, including his fellow goldsmith Michael Gilbert, a skinner Michael Turnet, the mason Thomas Jackson, a blacksmith Nicol Purves, and David Schang.

In 1563 David Schang worked on the refurbishment of St Giles, and made a seat in the church for Mary, Queen of Scots, working with George Tod and Patrick Schang, a task which took them half a day.

In 1564, Adam Schang and Patrick Schang with George Tod made the guillotine known as the Maiden which survives in the National Museums of Scotland. Patrick Schang was paid two pounds for his "whole labours and devising of the timber work". The Maiden was used to behead James Douglas, 4th Earl of Morton in 1581, and a legend developed that he had introduced its use, based on a model in Halifax.

Patrick Schang was one the craftsmen who put their names to a band for the dissolution of the marriage of Mary, Queen of Scots and the Earl of Bothwell on 2 July 1567. Others name include the goldsmith George Heriot (senior), the mason Thomas Jackson, James Young Deacon of the Hammermen, the tailor Alexander Sauchie, and the skinner Robert Abercromby.

In February 1581, David Schang was held in the Tolbooth of Edinburgh. He was found guilty of deception by pretending to have the ability to find lost objects by divination and taking money for consultations. He was led through the town with a paper on his hat describing his crime, and was banished from the burgh's freedom.

== Katherine Schang ==
By 1595 Katherine Schang, a daughter of Patrick Schang, had married Richard Dakin or Dakeyne of Biggin and Stubbing Edge near Ashover. She is said to have been a member of the household of Mary, Queen of Scots in England. She may have been the "Scottishe Mayd", one of two "maydens to serve the Queen's gentlewomen" listed at Chartley Castle in August 1586.
