= Alexander Park (merchant) =

Scottish merchant

- Born: Scotland
- Died: 1570; Edinburgh
- Occupation: Merchant
- Known for: Importing textiles and selling wine to Mary, Queen of Scots
- Spouse: Elizabeth Stevenson
- Children: Margaret and Elizabeth Park

Alexander Park (died 1570) was a Scottish merchant based in Edinburgh. He and his wife imported textiles and sold wine to Mary, Queen of Scots.

== Career ==
Alexander Park owned a house in Edinburgh, and was given permission to build cellars under the roadway in 1556. He supplied Spanish iron to Edinburgh Castle in 1553. He imported French wine from Dieppe and Bordeaux. In 1564, Park and his servant Thomas Dicksoun supplied barrels of Bordeaux and Vin de Graves for the household of Mary, Queen of Scots.

Park was married to Elizabeth Stevenson, who died in July 1569. In early modern Scotland, women did not use their husband's surnames. Her will reveals another significant aspect of their business, listing an extensive stock of imported luxury textiles, which were to be sold to tailors. Their merchant booth contained chamlet fabrics, bonnets lined with velvet, figured crepe velvet, satin, taffeta, counterfeit serge, and dornick linen for napkins. Customers included Lord Fleming and William Maitland of Lethington. Alexander Park sold a length of fine lawn linen for the use of Mary, Queen of Scots, in Edinburgh Castle when she was pregnant.

Alexander Park served as treasurer of the burgh council of Edinburgh and was Dean of Guild in 1564. He was involved in building projects for the town, often in consultation with William MacDowall. In 1552, Park supervised or made an account for building work at the pier at Leith. The structure, continuing the line of The Shore at the mouth of the Water of Leith, was known as the "bulwark". Stone was brought by boat for the work from a quarry at Granton. In July 1557, he viewed the ruinous chapel of St Roque at the Burgh Muir and works at the harbour at Newhaven with MacDowall. In November 1557, he was involved in repairs to the town wall at Blackfriars. In August 1564, Park organised work at Leith to clear the storm damaged harbour. The Comptroller of Scotland, John Wishart of Pitarrow, gave a tip or "drinksilver" of twenty shillings to carpenters working for Park.

In 1554, Park contributed £30 towards a loan of £1000 made to Henri Cleutin, a French diplomat who worked for Mary of Guise when she became Regent of Scotland. For New Year's Day 1555, the burgh council gave Mary of Guise two silver gilt cups bought from Alexander Park and the Flemish merchant Oglier Coqueil. Park's cup cost £42 and was described as a "goblet double overgilt".

In August 1559, Elizabeth Stevenson settled a business debt to John Cant of Leith. The notary at their meeting on the High Street was Gilbert Grote.

Another merchant Luke Wilson was town treasurer when Mary, Queen of Scots, returned to Scotland in 1561. Park and Wilson discussed a gift of a cupboard of silver plate for the queen.

Park was involved in Edinburgh's Yule or New Year's Day gift to Mary, Queen of Scots, for 1564. The burgh council asked Park to buy wine as a gift at Leith with flambeaux torches worth £20. The plan was changed and subsequently the council asked Park to reimburse the Queen's sommelier Master Louis for three tun barrels of wine and give him enough fine satin to make a doublet.

Thomas Dicksoun died at Campvere, the Scottish Staple, in November 1568. He had a large sum of gold, and a shipment of wine worth £160 Scots was on its way. He left his money to his relations and his possessions in his chamber in Park's house, a tin basin and jug, to Park's daughter Elizabeth. Details of the will suggest that Dicksoun was at the point of setting up as a merchant after his years of service with Park.

Alexander Park died in February 1570. His registered testament includes a stock of textiles, as narrated in his wife's will, and merchandise held by Nicoll Udwart.

== James Hathoway ==
James Hathowye or Hathoway (died 1579) was Park's nephew, the son of his sister Elizabeth Park. Hathoway was Park's agent in Bordeaux. Some time before February 1574 he married the Edinburgh money lender Janet Fockart.

== Margaret Park ==
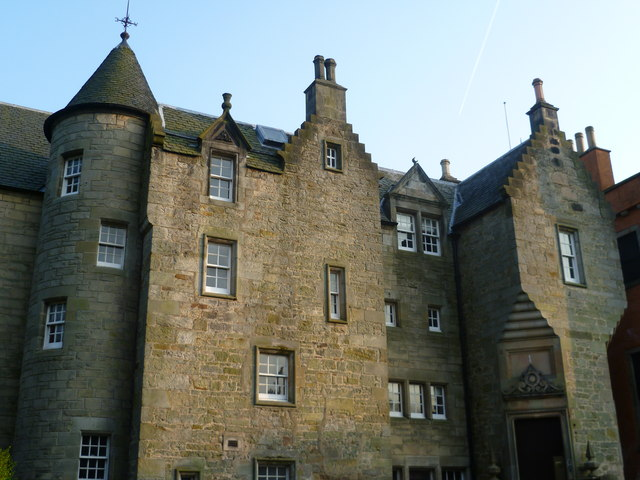
Margaret Park lived at Craigcrook Castle

His eldest daughter was Margaret Park (died 1569). She married William Adamson in 1566. Adamson was a young man with three legal curators, William Maitland of Lethington, John Bellenden of Auchnoule, and David Borthwick of Lochill. As part of the marriage contract she was given property at King's Cramond. William Adamson was the heir of his uncle who had been killed at the battle of Pinkie, and he became the laird of Craigcrook in the parish of Cramond. Margaret Park's testament lists the farm stock at Craigcrook. Their children included Elizabeth Adamson who married John Broun younger of Fordell (Perth) in 1581.

== Elizabeth Park and William Napier ==
His daughter Elizabeth Park married William Napier of Wrightshouses in the Grange, Edinburgh, around the year 1570. A stone pediment from Wrightshouses with the date 1570 depicts their conjoined heraldry supported by hands issuing from clouds with their initials "WN*EP" and a Latin motto Ditat Servata Fides which can be translated as "honesty is the best policy". The stone was taken to North Queensferry and used in an archway in the garden of a house called St Margarets. After the structure was demolished the stone was taken to the Museum of Edinburgh at Huntly House. The carved stone may date from the early 17th century, serving with others as a visual commemoration of the alliances of the Napier family.

William Napier and Elizabeth Park had an interest in the salt pans at Newhaven, Edinburgh. The pans were worked by two Flemish contractors Peter Scheves and Jacques Deburtyene (possibly the son-in-law of Adrian Damman). Eustachius Roche or Roog undertook to pay half the annualrent of £20 due to Napier and Park. The money was not forthcoming and there was a court case.
