= John Scot, Lord Scotstarvit =

Scottish judge, politician and author

Sir John Scot, Lord Scotstarvit (1585–1670), was a Scottish laird, advocate, judge, politician and author. He was Director of Chancery and a Lord of Session. His surname is often spelt as Scott, and Scotstarvit is also spelt as Scotstarvet or Scotstarver.

== Life ==
He was the only son of Robert Scot the younger of Knights-Spottie in Perthshire, representative in the male line of the Scots of Buccleuch. Robert Scot succeeded to the office of director of chancery on the resignation of his father, Robert Scot the elder of Knights-Spottie, but, falling into bad health, resigned the office in 1582 in favour of his father, its former holder. Robert Scot the elder in 1592 again resigned the office to a kinsman, William Scot of Ardross, on condition that his grandson, John Scott (the subject of this article) should succeed to it on attaining majority, which he did in 1606. The Scottish chancery framed and issued crown charters, brieves, and other crown writs. The possession, loss, and efforts to regain this office played a large part in the career of Sir John.

He was educated at St. Leonard's College, St. Andrews, which he appears to have entered in 1600: he describes himself in the register of 1603 as in his third year. After leaving St. Andrews he went abroad to study, and on his return was called to the bar in 1606. In 1611 he acquired Tarvet and other lands in Fife, to which he gave the name of Scotstarvet, and six years later he was knighted then made a privy councillor in 1622 by James VI, in whose honour he published a Latin poem, Hodœporicon in serenissimi et invictissimi Principis Jacobi Sexti ex Scotiâ suâ discessum.

In 1619 Scot had a license to go for a year to Flanders and elsewhere. He did not practise much, if at all, at the bar, but recommended himself to Charles I of Scotland by a suggestion for increasing the revenue by altering the law of feudal tenure. He became in 1629 an extraordinary, and in 1632 an ordinary, lord of session under the title of Scotstarvet.

He was one of many Scottish lawyers and lairds who accepted the covenant, which he subscribed at his parish kirk of Ceres, Fife on 30 April 1638, and in the following November he declined to sign the king's confession. In 1640 he served on the committee of the estates for the defence of the country. In 1641 he was, with consent of the estates, reappointed judge by a new commission. During the war between England and Scotland he served on the war committee in 1648 and 1649. He bought the Mill of Kinghorn and Inchkeith Island for 20,000 merks in 1649.

Under the Commonwealth he lost the office both of judge and director of chancery. He made many appeals to be restored to the latter as an administrative, and not a judicial, office; but, although he obtained an opinion in his favour by the commissioners of the great seal, Oliver Cromwell gave it in 1652 to Jeffrey the quaker, who held it till the Restoration. Scott, through George Monck, again appealed to Cromwell for the reversion of the office if Jeffrey died. Cromwell fined him £1,500 in 1654 for his part in the war. But his later correspondence with Cromwell did not improve his character with the royalists, and on the Restoration he was fined £500, and was not restored to the office of judge or that of director of chancery, which was conferred on Sir William Ker, who, he indignantly said, 'danced him out of it, being a dextrous dancer.' Sir James Balfour described Scott's public character in a few words: 'He was a busy man in troubled times.' But in spite of his misfortunes, Scot did not cease to be busy when peace came. He returned to Scotstarvet, where he engaged in literary work and correspondence. There he died in 1670.

== Works and legacy ==
Scott is characterized by James Grant in Old and New Scotland as "eccentric and sarcastic". He consoled himself for his disappointment in losing office by composing The Staggering State of Scottish Statesmen, not published until a hundred years after his death. The work also included Scot's memoir.

Scotstarvit Tower, which Sir John rebuilt, still stands, and the inscription, with his initials and those of his first wife, Anne Drummond, as the builders, and its date (1627) are carved on a stone over the door. The tower became a kind of college, where he attracted round him the learned Scotsmen of the time, and corresponded with the scholars of Holland, Caspar Barlæus, Isaac Gruterus, and others. In it his brother-in-law William Drummond composed his History of the Jameses and the macaronic comic poem Polemo-Middinia, which had its occasion in a dispute of long standing as to a right of way between the tenants of Scotstarvet and of Barns, the estate of Sir Alexander Cunningham, whose sister was Drummond's betrothed.

In 1620 he endowed the professorship of humanity or Latin in his old college, St. Leonard's, at the university of St. Andrews, in spite of the opposition of the regents of St. Salvator. At the same time he organised a substantial collective gift of classical texts to the library of St. Leonard's for the use of the Humanity regent. Fellow donors included Scott's brother-in-law, Drummond, and other distinguished men of the time.

Scott's intimacy with Joan Blaeu of Amsterdam led to the inclusion of a Scottish volume in the series of Delitiæ Poetarum then being issued by that enterprising publisher. The Scottish volume, edited by Arthur Johnston, and printed at the sole cost of Scott in two closely printed duodecimo volumes, has preserved the last fruits of Scottish latinity. A more important work was the publication of detailed maps of Scotland in the great atlas of Blaeu. Scot interested himself in the survey of Scotland begun in 1608 by Timothy Pont. Pont's drawings, after his death about 1614, were purchased by the crown. Scott caused them to be revised by Sir Robert Gordon of Straloch and his son, James Gordon, parson of Rothiemay, and then went in 1645 to Amsterdam to superintend their publication, dictating from memory the description of several districts. The work was not issued till 1654, when it appeared as 'Geographiæ Blaeuaniæ volumen quintum,’ with dedicatory epistles to Scot both by Blaeu and Gordon of Straloch. Other examples of Scott's public spirit were the establishment of the St. Andrews professorship of Latin and his endowment of a charity for apprenticing poor boys from Glasgow at the estate of Peskie near St. Andrews.

== Family ==
Scot was three times married: first, to Anne, sister of William Drummond of Hawthornden, the poet, by whom he had two sons and seven daughters; secondly, to Elizabeth, daughter of Sir James Melville, 2nd of Hallhill; and thirdly, to Margaret Monpenny of Pitmilly, widow of Rigg of Aitherny, by each of whom he had one son. The son by his second wife, George Scott (died 1685), is known as a writer on America.

Sir John's male descendants became extinct in the person of Major-general John Scot, M.P. for Fife, his great-great-grandson, who, at his death on 24 January 1776, was reputed the richest commoner in Scotland. The general's fortune passed chiefly to his eldest daughter, who married the Duke of Portland, but the estate of Scotstarvet was sold to Wemyss of Wemyss Hall.
