= Luke Wilson (merchant) =

Scottish merchant

- Born: Scotland
- Died: 1589; Edinburgh
- Other name: Luik Wilsoun
- Occupation: Merchant
- Years active: 1564-1589
- Known for: Textile trade and former treasurer to the Edinburgh council
- Spouse: Katharine Uddert
- Children: At least 2

Luke Wilson (died 1589) was a 16th-century Scottish merchant involved in the textile trade, the export of hides and wool, and lead mining. He served as treasurer to the burgh council.

== Career ==
Luke Wilson had a brother James Wilson, who lived at Biggar, South Lanarkshire. They were involved in the death of John Baxter in the early 1540s and later received a royal pardon or remission.

His name was sometimes spelled "Luik Wilsoun". He lived in Littil's Close in Edinburgh. Wilson was a prominent burgess who was tasked as treasurer of the burgh in 1561 to organise a pageant and a banquet to celebrate the royal entry of Mary, Queen of Scots.

In 1559, during the crisis of the Scottish Reformation, Wilson, Alexander Park, and John Spens cooperated with the Lords of the Congregation when a new burgh council was briefly led by Alexander Douglas of Kilspindie. In November, Wilson's and other merchant's cargoes were lost to pirates off the coast of Northumberland.

Wilson served as treasurer to the burgh council of Edinburgh. In May 1561, the burgh council asked him to send a present of white wine and claret to Lord Erskine, captain of Edinburgh Castle. In August 1561, he paid a contribution for a guard of men of arms commanded by James Hamilton, 3rd Earl of Arran. He was involved in the reception of Mary, Queen of Scots when she returned from France, and helped organise the ceremony of her Royal Entry. Mary wrote to Elizabeth I for an open passport for Wilson to travel on business to France.

On 22 May 1562, the burgh council decided to punish adulterers and "fornicatouris" by ducking them in the filthy water of the Nor Loch. Luke Wilson and Robert Glen, who served as treasurer in other years, were involved in the project to renew a place for "dowkeing of the saidis fornicatouris".

In 1565, John Stewart, 4th Earl of Atholl arranged for Luke Wilson, with James Johnston of Kellobank and Robert Ker, to manage his mining contract with Mary, Queen of Scots. The royal treasurer's accounts include the receipt of duty on exported ore. Barrels containing lead ore for export to Flanders were officially marked with branding irons by the Scottish mint, which was known as the "Cunze Hous".

In 1564, Wilson provided black satin to make a doublet for the Comptroller of Scotland, John Wishart of Pitarrow. Wilson was Dean of Guild in 1578–1579. He was censured for making the merchant Thomas Bell a burgess and guildbrother for only £30 Scots, and the burgh council subsequently set the fee at £40.

== Court case ==
In 1574, Robert Watson brought a case against Wilson and Archibald Stewart for non-payment of customs duties owed to the Scottish crown. Wilson had received wool, hides, and skins (for leather making) at the port of Acheson's Haven near Prestonpans, where Stewart acted as the customs officer. Wilson exported these goods from Leith, and claimed he did not have to pay customs again to Watson. He was represented at a hearing by his wife, Katherine Uddert. The Lords Auditors of the Exchequer found that Wilson should pay Watson, and Stewart should not collect duties.

== Family ==
Luke Wilson married Katharine Uddert, sister of the textile merchant Alexander Uddert (died 1597). Their children included:

- Susannah Wilson (died 1593), who married the goldsmith John Mosman, a son of John Mosman and Katherine Sym, and brother of Queen Mary's goldsmith James Mosman.
- Elizabeth Wilson, who married Henry Wardlaw of Pitreavie. Carved initials at Pitreavie Castle "D.E.W" are believed to refer to Dame Elizabeth Wilson.
