= Thomas Ewyn =

Scottish goldsmith (died 1569)

Thomas Ewyn (died 1569) was a Scottish goldsmith and Deacon of the Goldsmiths in Edinburgh.

== Career ==
Thomas Ewyn was Deacon of the Goldsmiths. He copied and wrote some of the craft statutes into a minute book. The original is lost, but a later copy survives. One of the craft records originally included by Ewyn has a list of materials used by goldsmiths in the 16th century, giving some idea of their use of technology and technique, "hanmilling of all cuilouris [enamel] to be sett under the staines of ringis, subleim argiston, antemonium sublimatum, tent, sandesier, haloume [alum], caperowes [copperas], salpeiter [saltpetre], verdegris, aqua fortus [acid], symound [solder], winstaine, brounstaine [brimstone], saigbanis, croithes, quicksilver, hormalaye."

In May 1555, there were discussions in Parliament and the Convention of Royal Burghs about the role of Craft Deacons in burgh councils. This was controversial, and Ewyn made a protest to Edinburgh's council on behalf of the Craft Deacons. Mary of Guise, Regent of Scotland, organised an arbitration to be held in January. There was some difficulty choosing the commissioners for the crafts, and at first a skinner Thomas Reidpath was picked. According to the minutes of the craft of Hammermen, an arbitration involved a cutler Edward Young, a tailor Archibald Denror or Dewar, and a baker David Kinloch speaking for the crafts. The resolution was marked by a public ceremony in January 1556 and the Mercat Cross was draped with tapestry "right honest and pleasant to all the craftsmen". Archibald Dewar worked for Regent Arran, and seems to have been Mary of Guise's personal tailor.

Ewyn was involved in planning the civic celebrations in Edinburgh for the return of Mary, Queen of Scots to Scotland in 1561. Ewyn, speaking on behalf of the Deacons of the Crafts, discussed finances for the event at a meeting of the burgh council on 27 August 1561.

On 24 September 1561, Ewyn presented candidates for election to the council, including his fellow goldsmith Michael Gilbert, a skinner Michael Turnet, the mason Thomas Jackson, blacksmith Nicol Purves, and the carpenter David Schang. The council argued with Ewyn that there should be 12 candidates for the two places allotted to the Crafts. Ewyn produced documents including an Act of Parliament of James III and a grant made by Mary of Guise which he contended showed how the Crafts should be involved in the council elections.

On 8 October 1561 Queen Mary disputed the election of the council. Ewyn wanted it put on record that he had voted for Thomas McCalzean as Provost of Edinburgh, on account of his ability and qualifications, and would otherwise have according to the queen's direction, if she had preferred a candidate. McCalzean was made Provost.

== Robert Ewyn ==
His brother was the chaplain and scribe, Robert Ewyn, who was clerk for the Edinburgh incorporation of Masons and Wrights and other building crafts. In 1548, Ewyn produced a manuscript copy of a key Scottish legal text, the Regiam Maiestatem, now kept at the University of St Andrews. Robert Ewyn also did legal work for the Edinburgh Skinner craft. As a graduate he used the title "sir" or "schir".

Another chaplain in Edinburgh, "sir" Thomas Ewan or Ewen, was probably a member of this family. He was chaplain of the altar of st Christopher in St Giles patronised by the Skinner craft. He was associated in 1529 with an altar of the Holy Blood. Ewen was to pray for the souls of members of the Bellenden family including Katherine Bellenden, Oliver Sinclair, and others including the King's pursemaster John Tennent and his wife the laundress Maus Atkinson. The foundation was funded from the rents of several properties on the High Street. Thomas Ewen was the owner of a manuscript of Lydgate's Troy Book, now held by the Bodleian Library.

== Death and will ==
Thomas Ewyn died on 10 May 1569. His will mentions that he had loaned goldsmith's files and a quantity of salammoniac, used to refine gold and silver, to another goldsmith, Alexander Gilbert. His daughter Barbara was the wife of the glazier Stevin Loch. His executors included the scribe Robert Ewyn and the goldsmith James Mosman. Unusually, the will includes a measure to avoid Thomas Ewyn's widow from continuing his business, as she was "ane woman of na schift", meaning she was not thought to have suitable initiative, and, perhaps because of her status and upbringing, was reluctant to become a businesswoman as a widow.
