= Robert Scott (lawyer) =

Robert Scott (died 1592) was a Scottish lawyer and Clerk of Session.

== Career ==
He was probably a grandson of Robert Scott of Allanhauch, who was a son of David Scott of Buccleuch. He spent some time in Glasgow, and seems to have had a connection with Irvine.

Scott was a "writer", a lawyer who literally had a writing office serving the court of session. His own handwriting first appears in the register of the acts of the lords of council in March 1539, and survives in many records. Scott was involved in compiling the record known as the "Register of Deeds" in which contracts were copied to avoid disputes. He copied the marriage contract of Mary, Queen of Scots and James Hepburn, 4th Earl of Bothwell.

His handwriting was well known to lawyers in his day. Changes in Scott's handwriting over the years were noted in a legal case in 1582:

And it is nocht grantit that as menis incresis in yeris that thai wreitt greater and unstaiblar, bot be contrar as men growis in yeiris thai use to wreitt smallar and witht ane mair staibill hand nor quhen thai war yung as Robert Scottis wreitting and mony utheris may testifie.

And it is not granted that as men increase in years that their writing is larger and more unstable, but, on the contrary, as men grow in years they habitually write smaller and with a more stable hand than when they were young as Robert Scott's writing and many others may testify.

In 1571 Scott loaned William Kirkcaldy of Grange £1000 Scots, despite instructions not to help the Queen's Party. Grange wanted the money to pay the garrison of Edinburgh Castle during the "Lang Siege", and gave Scott some of the jewels of Mary, Queen of Scots as a pledge. After the castle fell, Scott returned a "carcan" or garnishing, circled about with pearls, rubies and diamonds to Regent Morton. He hoped to get his money back in 1581, when Kirkcaldy's heirs were restored to their estates.

On 17 May 1575 Scott provided a banquet for the Dean of Moray and Thomas McCalzean, a lawyer working for Agnes Keith, Countess of Moray, in his Edinburgh house. Wine and sugar confections called "scorchattis" were served. The celebration was for completing an inventory of evidence, a compilation of the Countess' property charters.

Scott acquired the estate of Knightspotts in Perthshire from Archibald Dundas of Fingask in 1584.

He died on 28 March 1592.

== Marriages and family ==
His first wife was Elizabeth Sandilands. His second wife was Elizabeth Scott (d. 1592), widow of Alexander Scott of Orchardton. Their children included:

- Robert Scott (d. 1588), father of John Scott of Scotstarvit of Scotstarvit
- James Scott of Vogrie.
