= Thomas McCalzean =

Scottish judge and local politician

Thomas McCalzean, Lord Cliftonhall (pronounced and sometimes spelled McCalyeane, Macalzean or Macallyean) (c. 1520 – 1581) was a 16th-century Scottish judge, rising to be a Senator of the College of Justice and a local politician who was briefly Provost of Edinburgh in 1562 at the personal request of Mary Queen of Scots who sought a moderate influence during these troubled times.

== Career ==
He lived at Clifton Hall, west of Edinburgh. He trained as a lawyer and became a judge.

In 1543 Thomas McCalzean of Cliftonhall was a lawyer working for Mary of Guise. On her behalf he confiscated a ship belonging to Katherine Bellenden and Oliver Sinclair, who were holding Kirkwall Castle which belonged to Mary of Guise.

Around 1550 he married Elizabeth Galbraith.

In June 1556, in his role as City Assessor, he was temporarily suspended from his job for evil and foul language against the Queen Regent, Mary of Guise. He was restored to the job around two months later. He was a staunch supporter of the Reformation and happily moved to Protestantism.

In 1562 he was chosen by Mary, Queen of Scots to replace Archibald Douglas of Kilspindie, as a more moderate politician, and he was endorsed by Thomas Ewyn. However, the Queen's authority to do this was later challenged, and Archibald Douglas returned to his elected role within a year.

In 1563 he was appointed advocate to the Kirk in Edinburgh.

In October 1570 he was elected a Senator of the College of Justice, a senior position in the Scottish legal system, replacing Lord Henry Balnaves.

In 1570 he was involved in a famous Scottish court case: Ruthven v. McCalzean. This was between Thomas McCalzean and Archibald Ruthven, brother of William Ruthven, 1st Earl of Gowrie. The crux of the case is a breach of promise, relating to a marriage proposal between his daughter Eupham, and Ruthven.

During the Marian Civil War McCalzean supported the queen. He was granted a pardon or remission in May 1572 by Regent Mar for helping Mary's supporters, the Duke of Chatelherault and the Earl of Huntly when they held Edinburgh. The supporters of Mary, Queen of Scots continued to occupy Edinburgh Castle for a time. To fund the Castle garrison William Kirkcaldy of Grange took loans from his allies, offering the jewels of Mary, Queen of Scots as security. William Sinclair of Roslin sold his pledge of 200 gold royal buttons weighing 31 ounces to Thomas McCalzean for 500 merks. McCalzean surrendered the buttons to the Privy Council and Regent Morton on 6 July 1573.

McCalzean worked for Agnes Keith, Countess of Moray. On 17 May 1575 he enjoyed a banquet with Robert Scott and the Dean of Moray, in Scott's house in Edinburgh, where wine and sugar confections called "scorchattis" were served. The celebration was for completing an inventory of evidence, a compilation of the countess' property charters.

He died on 5 June 1581.

== Euphame MacCalzean ==
In 1587 his only child and heir, Euphame MacCalzean, was sole but absentee owner of The White House, on the south side of Edinburgh (on the site of St Margaret's Convent) when the house is proposed as a remote hospice for plague victims. The Edinburgh magistrates usurped the empty building for this use without consulting her and she had a long court battle to retrieve possession.

She was executed for witchcraft as part of the North Berwick witch trials in 1591. Execution was by public burning on the Castle Hill below Edinburgh Castle on 25 June 1591.
