= Elizabeth, Lady Wardlaw =

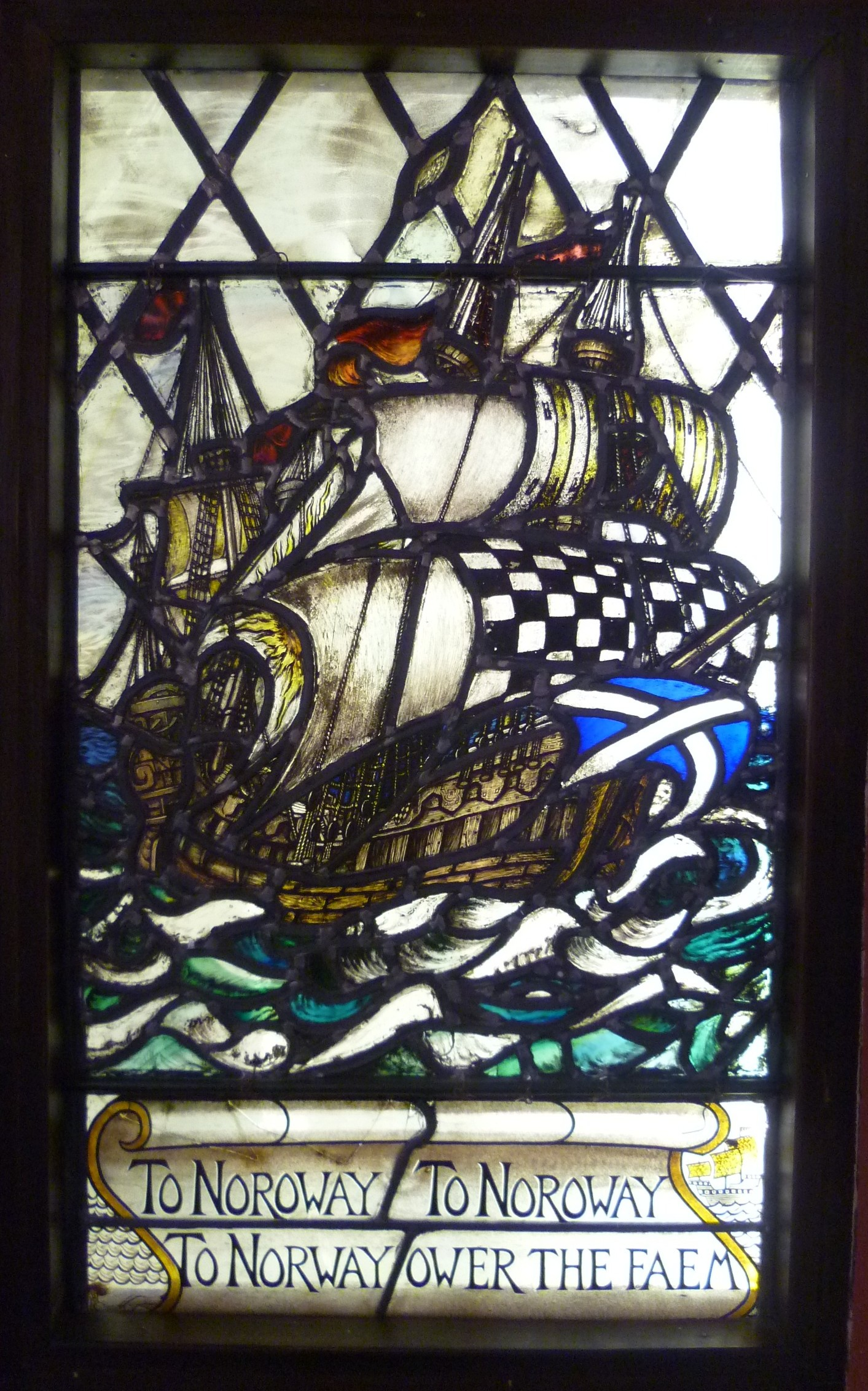
Authorship of the ballad of Sir Patrick Spens has been attributed to Wardlaw

Elizabeth, Lady Wardlaw (1677–1727) was a Scottish poet and the reputed author of the ballad Hardyknute.

== Biography ==
Elizabeth was born on 15 April 1677, the second daughter of Sir Charles Halket, baronet, of Pitfirran, Fife, and his wife Janet, daughter of Sir Patrick Murray. In 1696 she married Sir Henry Wardlaw, 4th Baronet, of Pitreavie and together they had three daughters and a son.

The ballad of Hardyknute, published in 1719 as an old poem, was supposed to have been discovered by her in a vault at Dunfermline, but no manuscript was ever produced. In 1724 Allan Ramsay included the poem in The Ever Green, his anthology of Scottish poetry. In the 1767 edition of Percy's Reliques the poem was ascribed to Lady Wardlaw. The ballad of Sir Patrick Spens (F. J. Child, English and Scottish Popular Ballads, ii. 17) has also been asserted to be her work, one of the supporters of the theory being Robert Chambers (Remarks on Scottish Ballads, 1859). Dr. Emily Lyle suggests that Lady Wardlaw was familiar with a pre-existing version of Sir Patrick Spens and drew upon it in composing Hardyknute.
