= Wardlaw baronets =

Baronetcy in the Baronetage of Nova Scotia

- Escutcheon of the Wardlaw baronets of Pitreavie
- Creation date: 1631
- Status: extant
- Motto: Familias firmat pietas, Piety strengthens families

The Wardlaw Baronetcy, of Pitreavie in the County of Fife, is a title in the Baronetage of Nova Scotia. It was created on 5 March 1631 for Henry Wardlaw, Chamberlain to Anne of Denmark, consort of James VI, with remainder to heirs male whatsoever. He had acquired Pitreavie in 1606 and this was erected into a barony in 1627. As of 5 June 2025 the twenty-second Baronets successfully proved succession and is therefore on the Official Roll of the Baronetage. The baronetcy considered dormant between 1983 and 2025. The poet Elizabeth, Lady Wardlaw was the wife of the fourth Baronet.

== Wardlaw baronets, of Pitreavie (1631) ==
- Sir Henry Wardlaw, 1st Baronet (1565–1637)
- Sir Henry Wardlaw, 2nd Baronet (died 1653)
- Sir Henry Wardlaw, 3rd Baronet (1618–c. 1680)
- Sir Henry Wardlaw, 4th Baronet (died 1683)
- Sir Henry Wardlaw, 5th Baronet (died 1709)
- Sir Henry Wardlaw, 6th Baronet (died 17..)
- Sir Henry Wardlaw, 7th Baronet (1705–c. 1720)
- Sir George Wardlaw, 8th Baronet (1675–c. 1730)
- Sir Henry Wardlaw, 9th Baronet (died 1739)
- Sir David Wardlaw, 10th Baronet (1678–c. 1750)
- Sir Henry Wardlaw, 11th Baronet (died 1782)
- Sir David Wardlaw, 12th Baronet (died 1793)
- Sir John Wardlaw, 13th Baronet (died 1823)
- Sir William Wardlaw, 14th Baronet (1794–c. 1830)
- Sir Alexander Wardlaw, 15th Baronet (c. 1790–1833)
- Sir William Wardlaw, 16th Baronet (c. 1791–1863)
- Sir Archibald Wardlaw, 17th Baronet (1793–1874)
- Sir Henry Wardlaw, 18th Baronet (1822–1897)
- Sir Henry Wardlaw, 19th Baronet (1867–1954)
- Sir Henry Wardlaw, 20th Baronet (1894–1983)
- Sir Henry John Wardlaw, 21st Baronet (1930–2005)
- Sir Henry Justin Wardlaw, 22nd Baronet (born 1963)

The heir apparent is Henry (Harry) Wardlaw (born 1999), son of the 22nd Baronet.
