= Lochore Castle =

Coordinates: 56.1484°N 3.3290°W

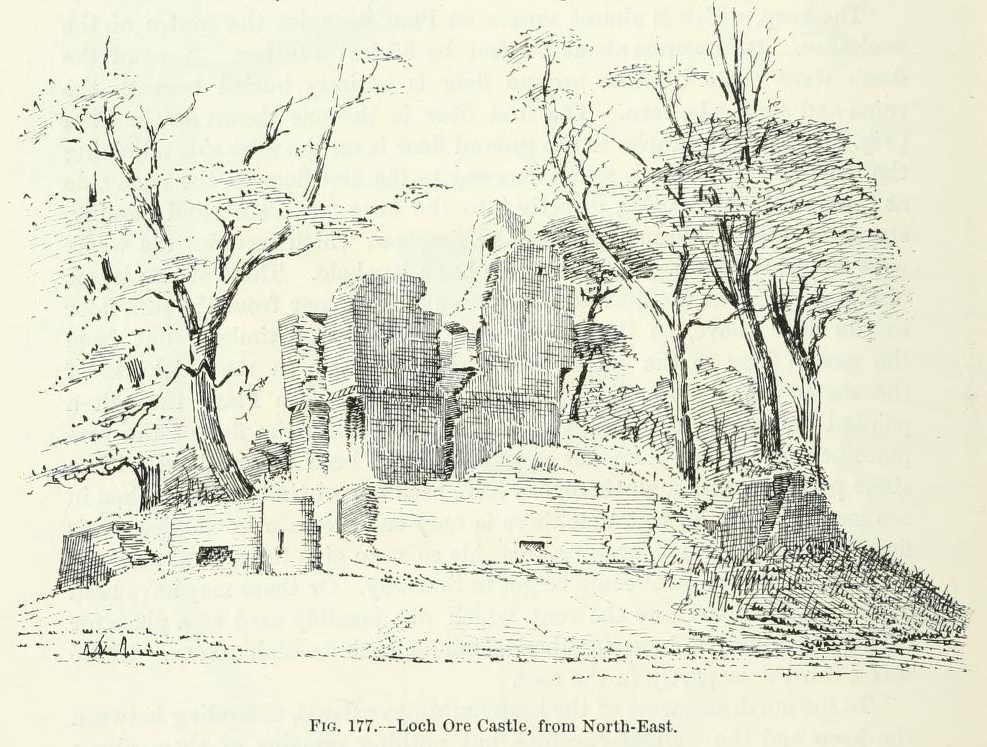
Loch Ore Castle, from the north-east, circa 1880

Lochore Castle is a ruined 14th-century tower house, about 3 miles (4.8 km) south east of Cowdenbeath, Fife, Scotland, and south of Lochore, east of Loch Ore, in Lochore Country Park.

Little remains of the castle, which was originally on the island of Inchgall, the name meaning “Isle of Strangers”. It may be known alternatively as Inchgall Castle

== History ==
Duncan of Lochore first built a motte on this site, during the reign of Malcolm IV of Scotland. The Valances acquired the castle (apparently by marriage) and extended it before constructing the keep during the 14th century, having probably lowered the motte. Thereafter in came into the hands of the Wardlaws of Torrie, and was then acquired by the Malcolms of Balbedie

At the end of the 18th century, the loch was drained.

== Structure ==
The keep had four storeys, and a courtyard with four corner towers, which enclosed ranges of buildings. Probably the castle was approached by a causeway from the east.

The wider area was landscaped and loch refilled in the 1980s, to restore it after the devastation caused by mining in the 20th century.

== See also ==
- Castles in Great Britain and Ireland
- List of castles in Scotland
