= Pitreavie Castle =

Coordinates: 56°2′54.32″N 3°25′1.04″W

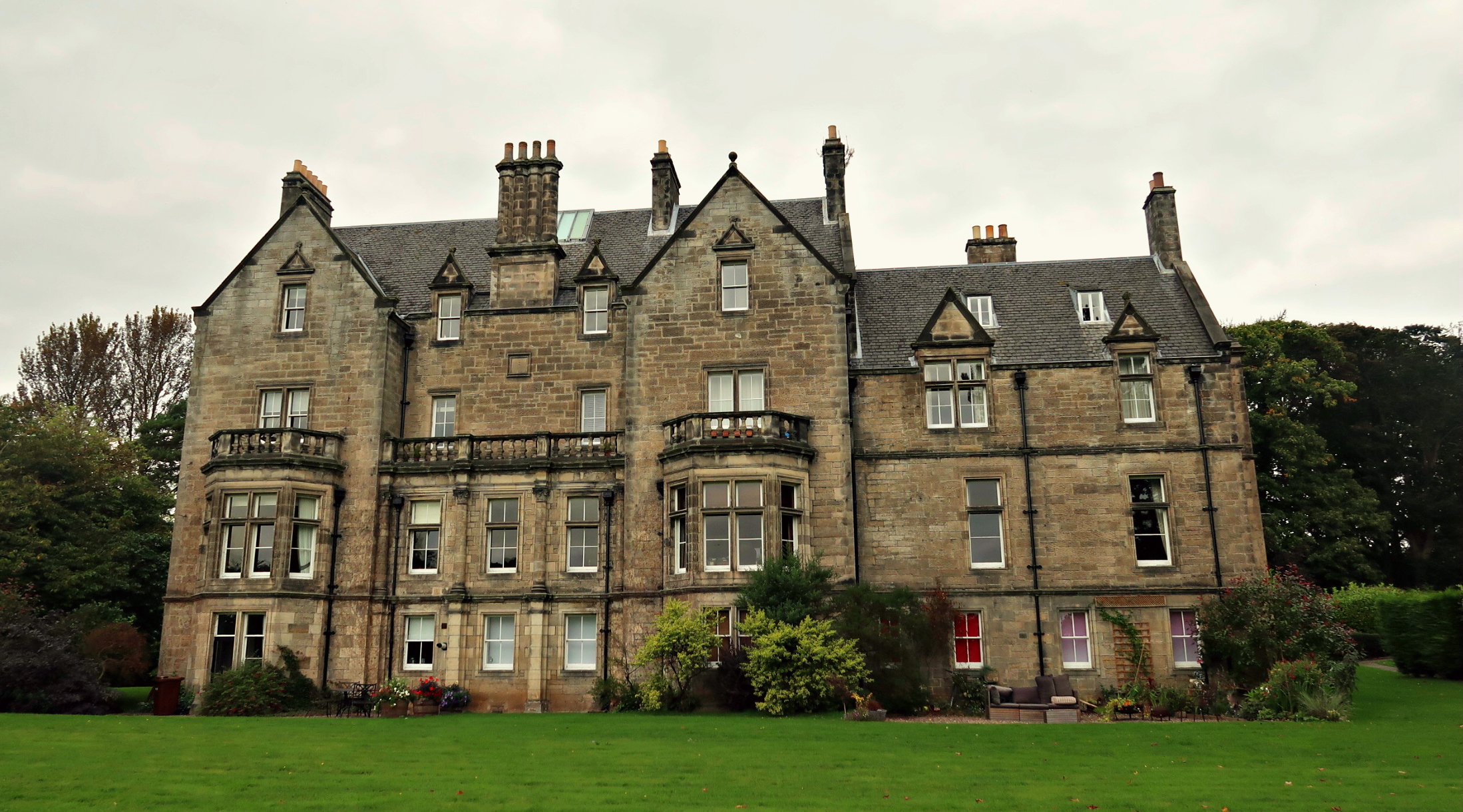
Pitreavie Castle in 2019

Pitreavie Castle is a country house, located between Rosyth and Dunfermline in Fife, Scotland. It was built in the early 17th century, and was extensively remodelled in 1885. The house remained in private hands until 1938, when it was acquired by the Air Ministry, and became RAF Pitreavie Castle. The RAF station closed in 1996, and the building was converted into residential apartments.

In 1986, the large underground cellar was still operated by the RAF as the Command and Control Centre of the then Northern Command for dispatching and coordinating all air and maritime search and rescue assets, primarily RAF aircraft over the North Sea area.

== History ==
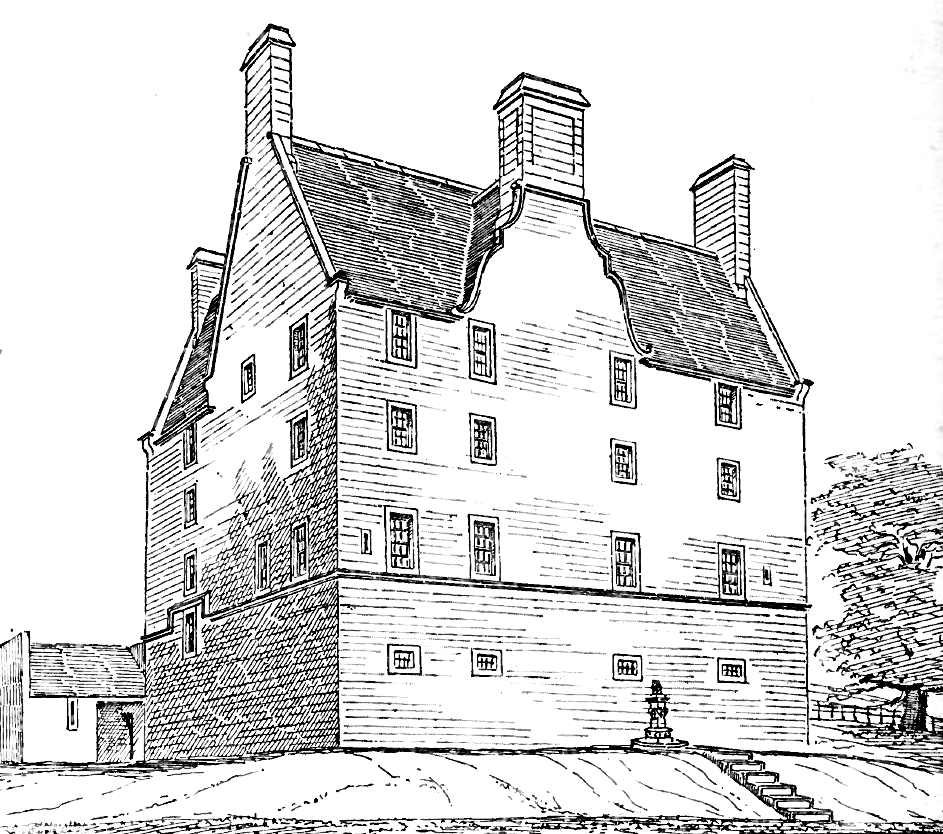
South front of Pitreavie Castle, drawn in the 19th century by MacGibbon and Ross, prior to the alterations of the 1880s

The Pitreavie estate was owned by Lady Christina Bruce, sister of Robert the Bruce, in the 14th century. Henry Wardlaw of Balmule (later Sir Henry Wardlaw, 1st Baronet of Pitreavie) bought the estate in 1608 for 10,000 merks Scottish from James Kellock and his wife. Wardlaw was Chamberlain to Queen Anne, wife of James VI of Scotland. He married Elizabeth Wilson, a daughter of the prominent Edinburgh merchant Luke Wilson.

When James acceded to the English throne in 1603 and travelled south to London, he left Dunfermline Palace in Wardlaw's care. Henry Wardlaw became a Baronet of Nova Scotia in 1631, and died in 1637, succeeded by his eldest son, also Henry. Wardlaw's granddaughter, Elizabeth Wardlaw, was the reputed author of the poem Hardyknute and the ballad Sir Patrick Spens.

Wardlaw began to construct the house in 1615. It was originally built to a U-shaped plan, with a symmetrical layout comprising a rectangular main body about 20 metres (66 ft) long, two short wings projecting to north, and spiral staircases rising up both interior angles. The roof originally had crow steps on the gables and dormer windows, with the only entrance on the inner side of the west wing: a matching door in the east wing led down to a blind cellar. There were only small windows on the ground floor. Pitreavie is considered to be an important example of an early 17th-century symmetrically planned house, in the style of Sir James Murray, the King's Master of Works, and is similar to his Baberton House of the 1620s. The grounds were planted as a wilderness in the late 17th century, with acres of ash, birch and elm trees.

During the invasion of Scotland by Oliver Cromwell, the Battle of Pitreavie was fought nearby on 20 July 1651, between an English force commanded by Colonel Robert Overton and a Scottish force, including some 800 Highlanders from the Clan Maclean. After the battle, which was a decisive victory for the Cromwellian forces (contemporary reports speak of 2,000 Scots killed and 1,600 captured, all for the loss of 8 of Overton's troops), a group of Macleans sought refuge in the house, but cursed the Wardlaw family when they were refused sanctuary.

=== Alterations ===
The house was sold to Archibald Primrose, 1st Earl of Rosebery, in 1703, and then to Sir Robert Blackwood, Lord Dean of Guild, and later Lord Provost, of Edinburgh, in 1711. It remained in the Blackwood family for 170 years, but was unoccupied for almost a century. The castle was bought by Henry Beveridge, a wealthy mill owner, in 1884, when it was extended and modernised. He commissioned the architect Charles Kinnear in 1885 to add an east wing, insert larger windows on the ground floor, and add a portico to the north, leading to a new main entrance. The additions were detailed in a similar Scottish Renaissance style. The grounds were also renovated, with a water garden and a narrow-gauge railway. Two entrance lodges were also built; the East Lodge survives, but the western one was demolished.

=== RAF Pitreavie Castle ===
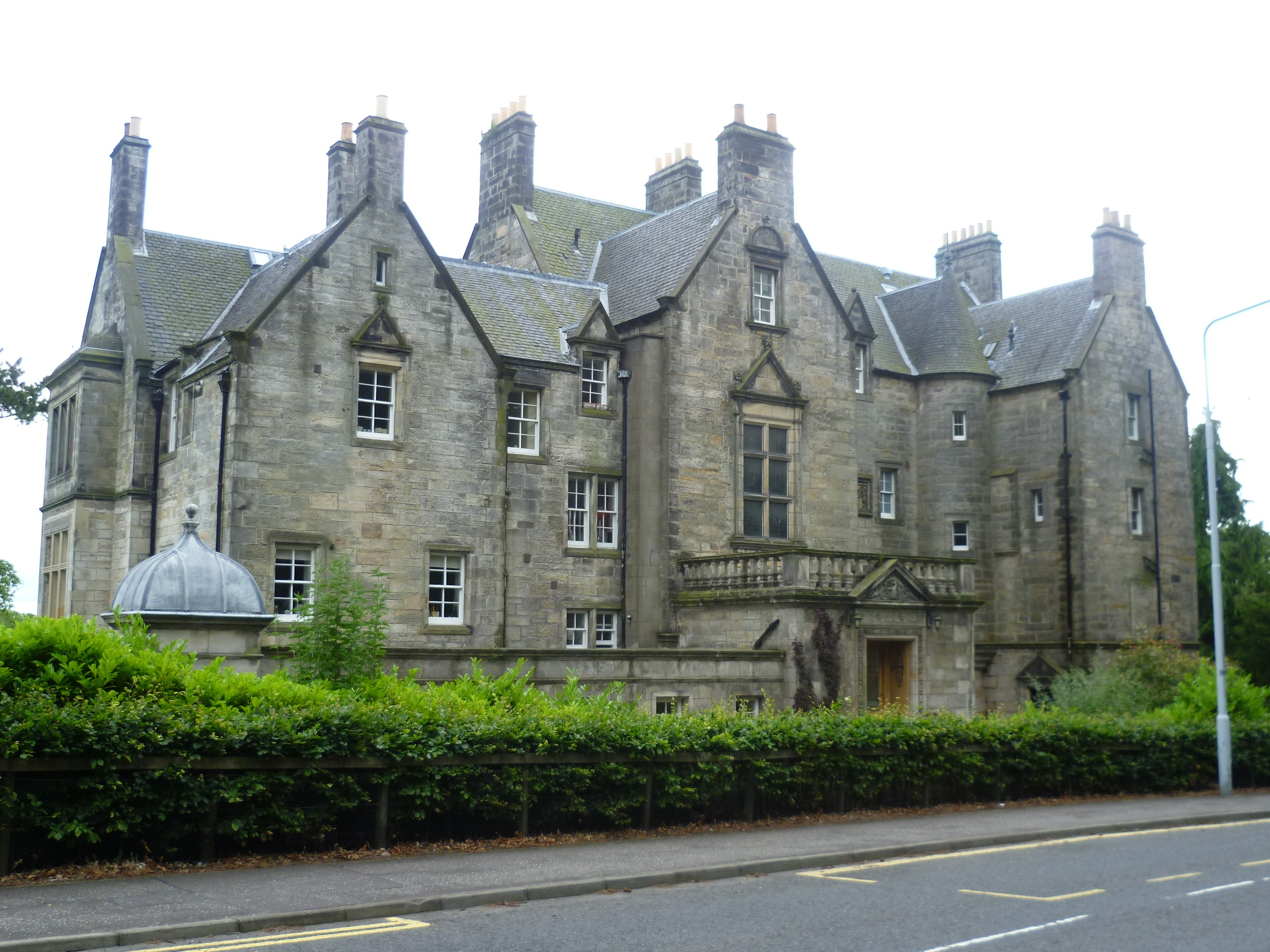
Pitreavie House in 2011

Beveridge died in 1922, and the castle was sold to the Air Ministry in 1938 for £12,306, who added a concrete outbuilding housing kitchens, a bar and a dining room, a bunker, and other outbuildings. The castle was used to coordinate operations of the Royal Navy and Royal Air Force Coastal Command. Other buildings added when the castle was the home of RAF Pitreavie Castle have been demolished.

After the Second World War, Pitreavie Castle became the headquarters of the NATO North Atlantic Area, home of the commanders of air forces (No. 18 Group RAF) and of naval forces in the North Atlantic, and the home of the Air Officer Scotland and Northern Ireland (AOSNI). The base closed in 1996, and its role as a maritime rescue co-ordination centre was moved to RAF Kinloss. The castle has now been converted into several apartments with most of the surviving grounds developed as private housing and the Carnegie Campus business park. The castle is now a category A listed building.
