= Henry Wardlaw of Pitreavie =

Henry Wardlaw of Pitreavie (1565–1637) was a Scottish courtier and administrator.

== Background ==
He was the son of Cuthbert Wardlaw of Balmule and Katherine Dalgleish, and a grandson of Henry Wardlaw of Torrie.

== Career ==
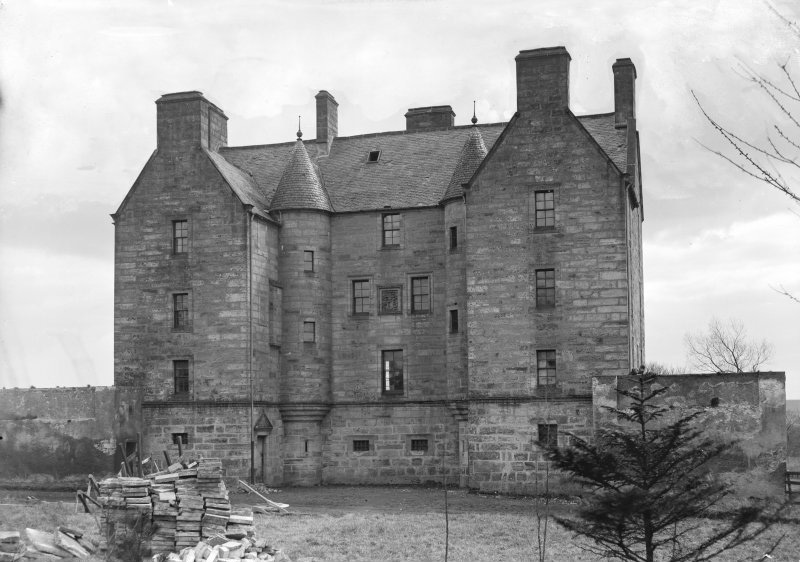
Pitreavie Castle before nineteenth-century alterations

Wardlaw was administrator of the Dunfermline estates of Anne of Denmark, wife of James VI His predecessor as the queen's chamberlain was William Schaw. The queen's property (as settled in 1593) included the Lordship of Dunfermline, the Earldom of Ross, and Lordships of Ardmannoch and Etrrick Forest, and Wardlaw compiled accounts of the queen's revenue. In 1596, the financial administrators known as the Octavians appointed Wardlaw as Receiver General, responsible for the income of the Comptrollery and the New Augmentations (duties paid from former church lands) and mint.

Wardlaw complained to the Privy Council of Scotland in June 1602 about non-paying tenants of the queen in Ettrick Forest.

In 1609 he advanced £200 Sterling in recompense for jewels taken from Anne of Denmark by Margaret Hartsyde.

In 1612 Anne of Denmark sent instructions to Henry Wardlaw for the baptism of Anne Home, a daughter of Mary (Dudley) Sutton, Countess of Home and the Earl of Home. The queen as sponsor or godmother wanted presents of money distributed at the baptism, and Anna Hay, Countess of Winton was to be her representative.

He was knighted at Royston on 22 October 1613. Wardlaw acquired the "superiority" of the lands of Pitreavie from the burgh of Edinburgh in May 1614.

Wardlaw became involved in building works at other royal palaces and castles. In 1615, he contributed £7000 from the royal rents he received to repairs at Edinburgh Castle. King James planned to return to Scotland in 1617. The depute-treasurer Gideon Murray gave Wardlaw and James Baillie of Lochend £30,000 towards repairs at Edinburgh Castle, Stirling Castle, Falkland Palace, and Holyrood Palace.

After the death of Anne of Denmark in 1619, Wardlaw continused to administer the Dunfermline estates for Prince Charles, and his accounts for this period survive in the National Archives of Scotland. After the death of James VI and I, John Auchmoutie, John Livingston and John Murray continued to draw salaries as grooms of his bedchamber of in Scotland. Henry Wardlaw and other officers of crown rents in Scotland were given directions to pay them.

King Charles is said to have sent him a bible with an embroidered crimson velvet cover for his services, and gave him a pair of gloves, perhaps in 1633. These are now kept by the University of St Andrews.

In 1626 Wardlaw paid from his receipts of royal revenue for 26 blue gowns given 26 poor men at Holyrood Abbey on the birthday of King Charles, 19 November. Wardlaw delivered substantial sums from royal rents to James Murray of Kilbaberton for projects including the repair of Dumbarton Castle, Linlithgow Palace, and Falkland Palace in 1629. Some accounts for crown revenue made by Wardlaw from the papers of the Earls of Mar are held by the National Records of Scotland.

Wardlaw built Pitreavie Castle near Dunfermline, probable employing the royal master of work James Murray.

== Death ==
He died in 1637. He was buried at Dunfermline Abbey in the burial vault granted him by Anne of Denmark in 1616.

== Marriage and family ==
He married Elizabeth Wilson, a daughter of the Edinburgh merchant Luke Wilson. Their children included:

- Henry Wardlaw (d. 1653), who married Margaret Beaton, a daughter of David Beaton of Balfour
- Elizabeth Wardlaw, who married Anthony Alexander, Master of Works, in 1633.
- John Wardlaw of Abden
- William Wardlaw of Balmule, who married Christian Foulis, a daughter of James Foulis of Colinton
- Anne Wardlaw (born 1606), named after Anne of Denmark, who married (1) on 19 June 1623, William Lundie of Lundie, (2) David Sibbald
- Margaret Wardlaw, who married James Reed, Provost of Dunfermline.
