= Craigleith =

Island in East Lothian, Scotland, UK

Creag Lìte (Gaelic)
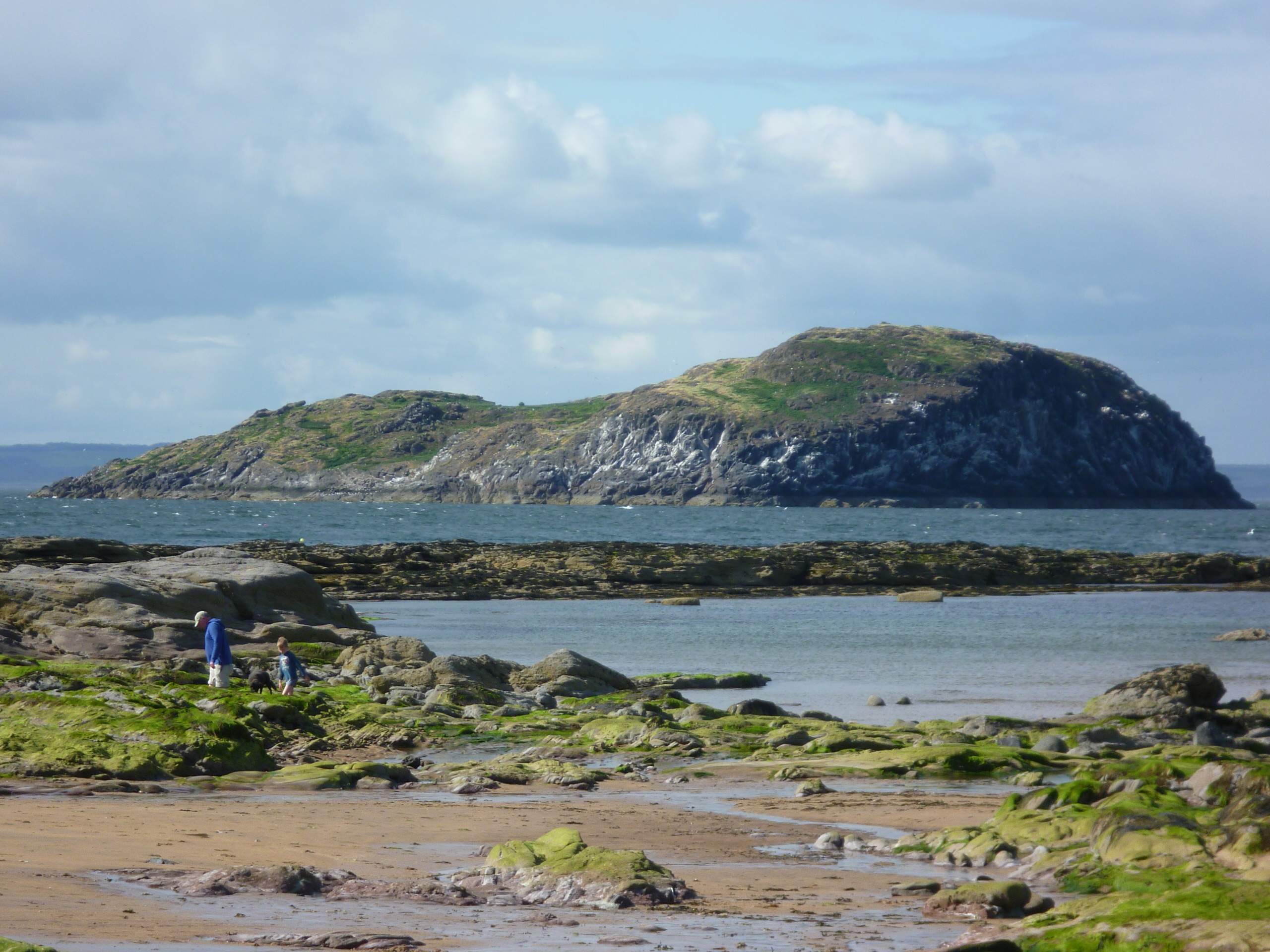
- Craigleith from the East Bay, North Berwick

Location
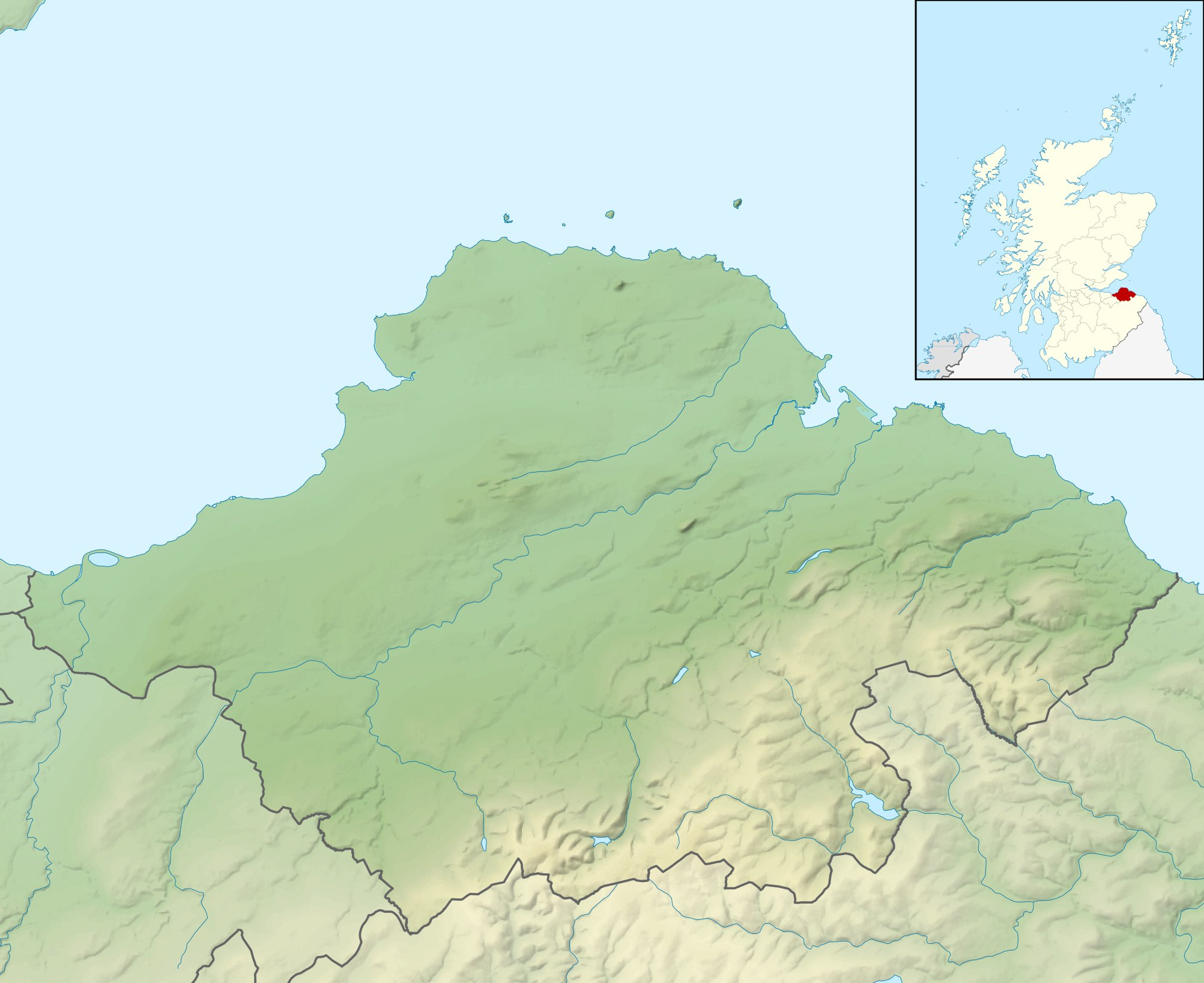
- The island shown within East Lothian
- Coordinates: 56.073363°N 2.718848°W

Name
- Name meaning: rock of Leith

Physical geography
- Island group: Islands of the Forth
- Highest elevation: 45 metres (148 ft)

Administration
- Council area: East Lothian
- Country: Scotland
- Sovereign state: United Kingdom

Demographics
- Population: 0

Craigleith (Scottish Gaelic: Creag Lìte) is a small island in the Firth of Forth off North Berwick in East Lothian, Scotland. Its name comes from the Scottish Gaelic Creag Lìte meaning "rock of Leith". It is 45 metres (148 feet) at its highest point.

== Geography and geology ==
Craigleith is part of a chain of four islands near North Berwick, along with Bass Rock, Fidra and the Lamb. Of these, it is the closest to the town's harbour. Like these other nearby islands, Craigleith is a bird colony. Divers often explore the area around the island.

Craigleith is a laccolith, a lava dome. (The Lothians are dotted with evidence of ancient volcanic activity, such as Bass Rock and Arthur's Seat.) Craigleith is made up of essexite, which is popular for making curling stones.

== History and wildlife ==
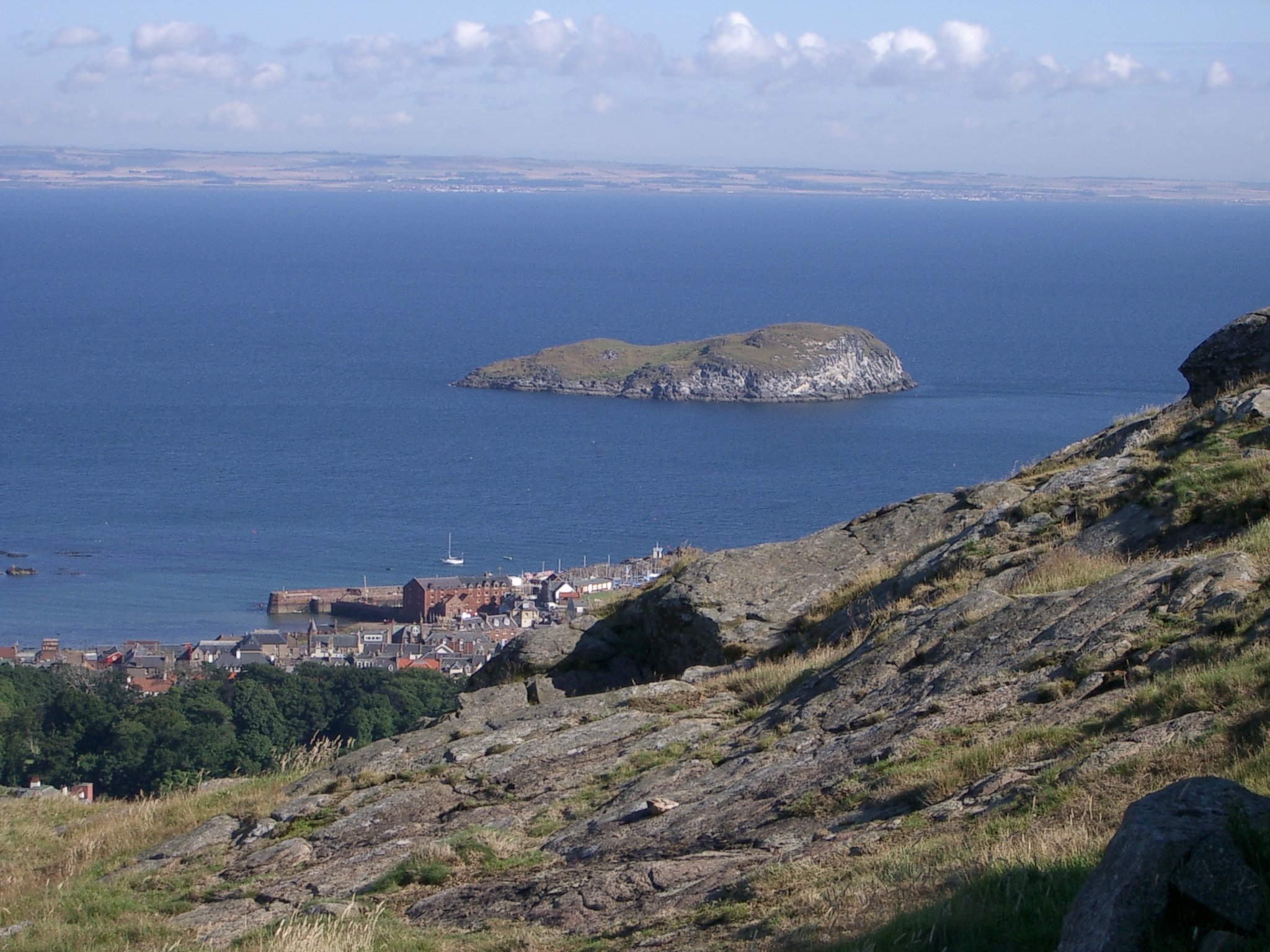
Craigleith and North Berwick from North Berwick Law

Historically, Craigleith was a rabbit warren, where the animals were deliberately bred for food. Rabbits were wiped out by myxomatosis in the 1950s. They were mysteriously re-introduced onto the island in 2008, and some have been seen recently.

In 1814, Sir Hew Dalrymple purchased the island from North Berwick Town Council.

The puffin colony on Craigleith, once one of the largest in Britain with 28,000 pairs, became endangered from 1999 onwards, due to an invasion of the non-endemic plant tree mallow, thriving with warmer winters, which choked the puffins' burrows, preventing them from rearing their chicks, or "pufflings". An ongoing project, SOS Puffin, led by the Scottish Seabird Centre at North Berwick, was launched early in 2007 after one of the Centre's volunteers, Maggie Sheddan, noticed the ever-decreasing numbers of puffins. Since then, hundreds of volunteers have been working hard to rid the island of the problem, ferried out by boat from the Seabird Centre during the winter months, when the puffins are out at sea. Initial results show signs that the puffins are starting to return to the island to breed. Cormorants, shags and guillemots breed here.

The Scottish Seabird Centre has solar-powered cameras on the islands which transmit images of the puffins and other wildlife on the island via live webcams. Daily boat trips around the island have been made since 2008.

In 2026 Hew Dalrymple sold the island, along with the neighbouring Bass Rock, to RSPB Scotland.

== See also ==
- List of islands of Scotland
