= Islands of the Forth =

Group of islands in the Firth of Forth, Scotland

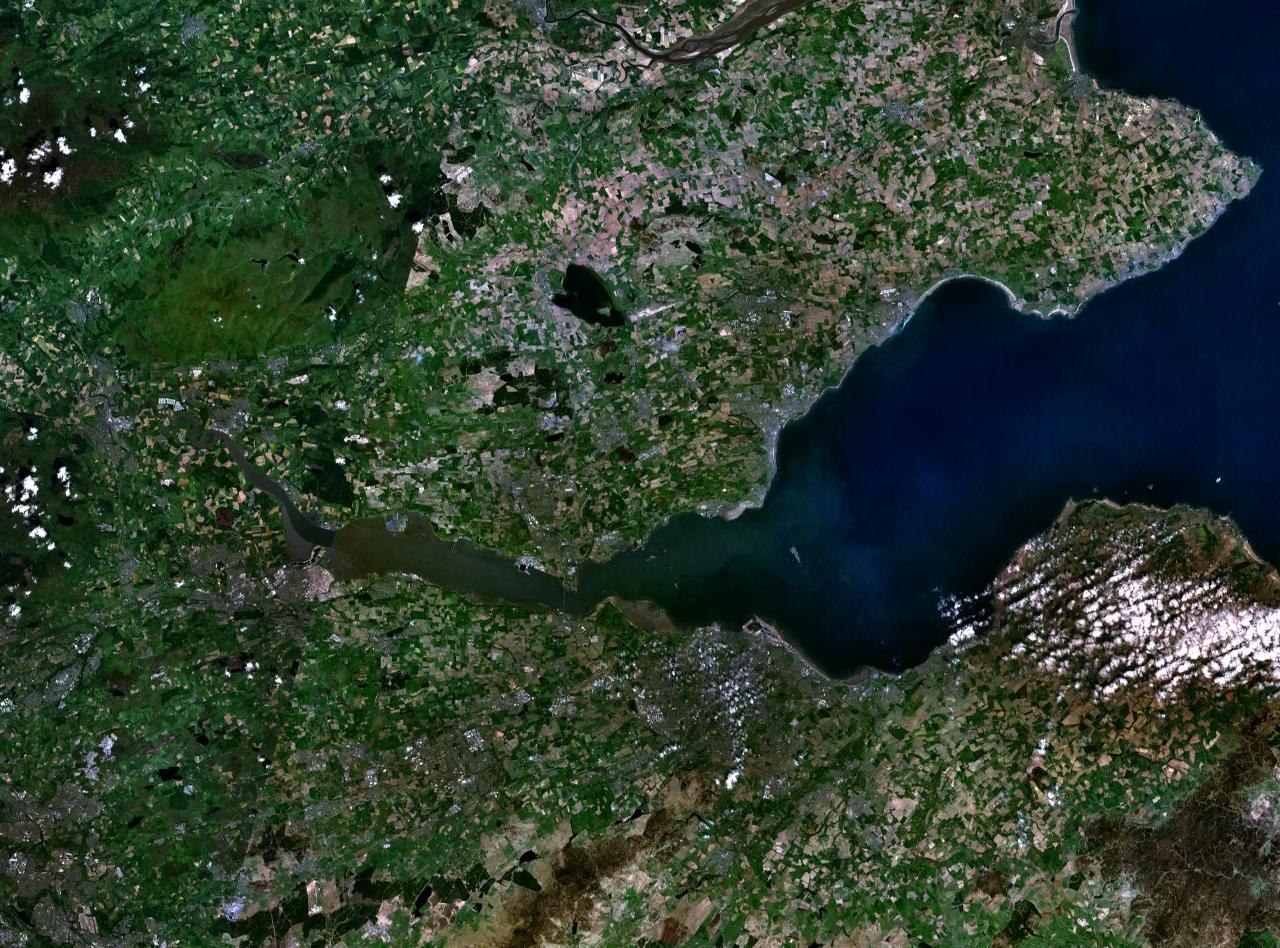
Satellite photo of the Firth of Forth and the surrounding area

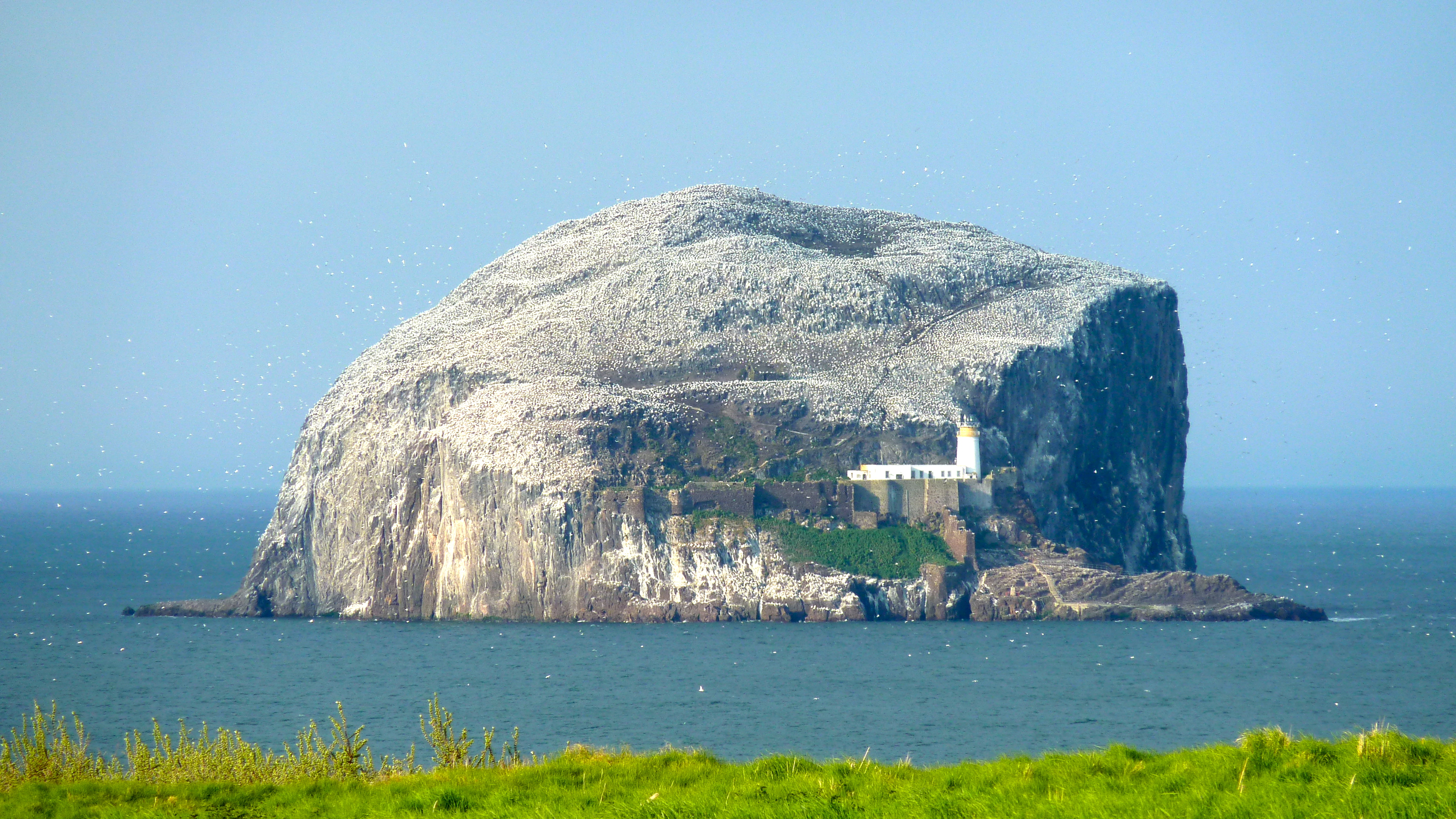
The Bass Rock from North Berwick

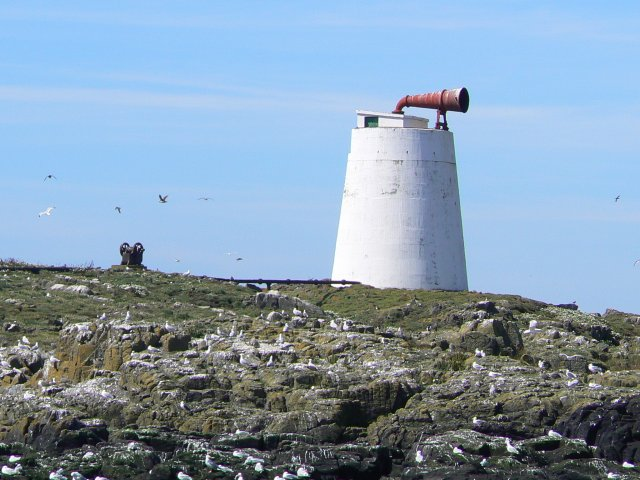
Foghorn on the Isle of May

The Islands of the Forth are a group of small islands located in the Firth of Forth and in the estuary of the River Forth on the east coast of Scotland. Most of the group lie in the open waters of the firth, between the Lothians and Fife, with the majority to the east of the city of Edinburgh. Two islands lie further west in the river estuary.

The islands have a varied geology and history; over the centuries, several have had both ecclesiastical connections and a history of involvement in military occupations. Various lighthouses and other aids to navigation have been erected on the islands and skerries — one of these dates to the 17th century. But only one of the islands still has year-round human inhabitants. The area has diverse bird and sea life. The scientific name for the northern gannet was chosen in recognition of this bird's connection with the Bass Rock.

There are only a few islands off the coast of eastern Scotland, and most of them of any significant size are included in this group. (Note: Other east coast islands include Mugdrum in the Firth of Tay and Inchcape, a reef notoriously hazardous to ships off the Angus coast. For a full list, see List of outlying islands of Scotland.)

== Geography ==
Furthest east is the Isle of May, off the coast of Fife south of Crail. To the south in the outer Firth there is a group of islands off East Lothian near North Berwick and Gullane; from east to west they are the Bass Rock (also known simply as "The Bass"), Craigleith, Lamb, Fidra and Eyebroughy. A second group lie in the inner Firth of Forth. Inchkeith and Inchcolm are off Kinghorn and Aberdour on the north shore, Inchgarvie lies midway between North and South Queensferry, and Inchmickery and Cramond Island are nearer to Edinburgh on the south shore. Alloa Inch and Tullibody Inch are furthest west in the estuarine waters of the River Forth.

Only one of these islands, Inchcolm, has had a resident population in recent years, although there have been monasteries, hermitages, lighthouses and fortifications on most of them in the past. In the late 19th century, the Isle of May had a population of over 20. Many of the island names have the first element, "Inch-" (from Innis, the Gaelic word for "island"). (Note: Innis also means "meadow".)

== Geology ==
Geologically, most of the islands are the remnants of igneous intrusions. The Isle of May's rock is "fine grained basalt of a dark-grey colour with tinges of green and greenstone". Fidra is also largely basalt and The Bass is a phonolite volcanic plug. Craigleith is a laccolith made up of essexite which is popular for making curling stones and Cramond island is made up of dolerite. Inchmickery and Inchgarvie are of igneous origin and the latter is partly made up of picrite. Studies of the landscape beneath the waters of the firth have revealed that the visible surface of Inchgarvie is only the top of a larger crag and tail structure similar in structure to Edinburgh Castle and the Royal Mile created by glacial action. The tidal islet of Eyebroughy is about 1.5 kilometres (0.93 mi) to the west of Fidra. Its component rock is trachyte and Lower Carboniferous in origin.

Most of Inchkeith is of volcanic origin but there are also sections of sandstone, coal, limestone and shale, the last named containing numerous fossils. There are also several springs on the island. Inchcolm is similarly varied, consisting of greenstone, sandstone, shale and limestone.

== Natural history ==
The Firth is an important area for nature conservation and has a range of habitats including extensive mudflats, shingle shorelines and saltmarsh. The last named, which is well developed on Alloa Inch, is typically dominated by saltmarsh rush, sea club-rush, sea aster and common saltmarsh-grass. The inner Firth is important for nationally and internationally important numbers of wintering wildfowl and wading birds and hosts populations of shelduck, knot, redshank, great crested grebe, teal and goldeneye. The outer islands support significant numbers of nesting seabirds. The Bass Rock has more than 150,000 nesting northern gannets and is the largest single rock gannetry in the world. When viewed from the mainland much of the rock looks white due to the sheer number of birds (and their droppings, which give off 152 tonnes of ammonia per year). The scientific name of this gannet, Morus bassanus, is derived from the rock. The bird was traditionally known locally as the solan goose, and its eggs and meat were considered delicacies. It is estimated that in 1850 almost 2000 birds were harvested from the rock. Other bird species on the rock include guillemot, razorbill, cormorant, puffin, eider duck and numerous gulls.

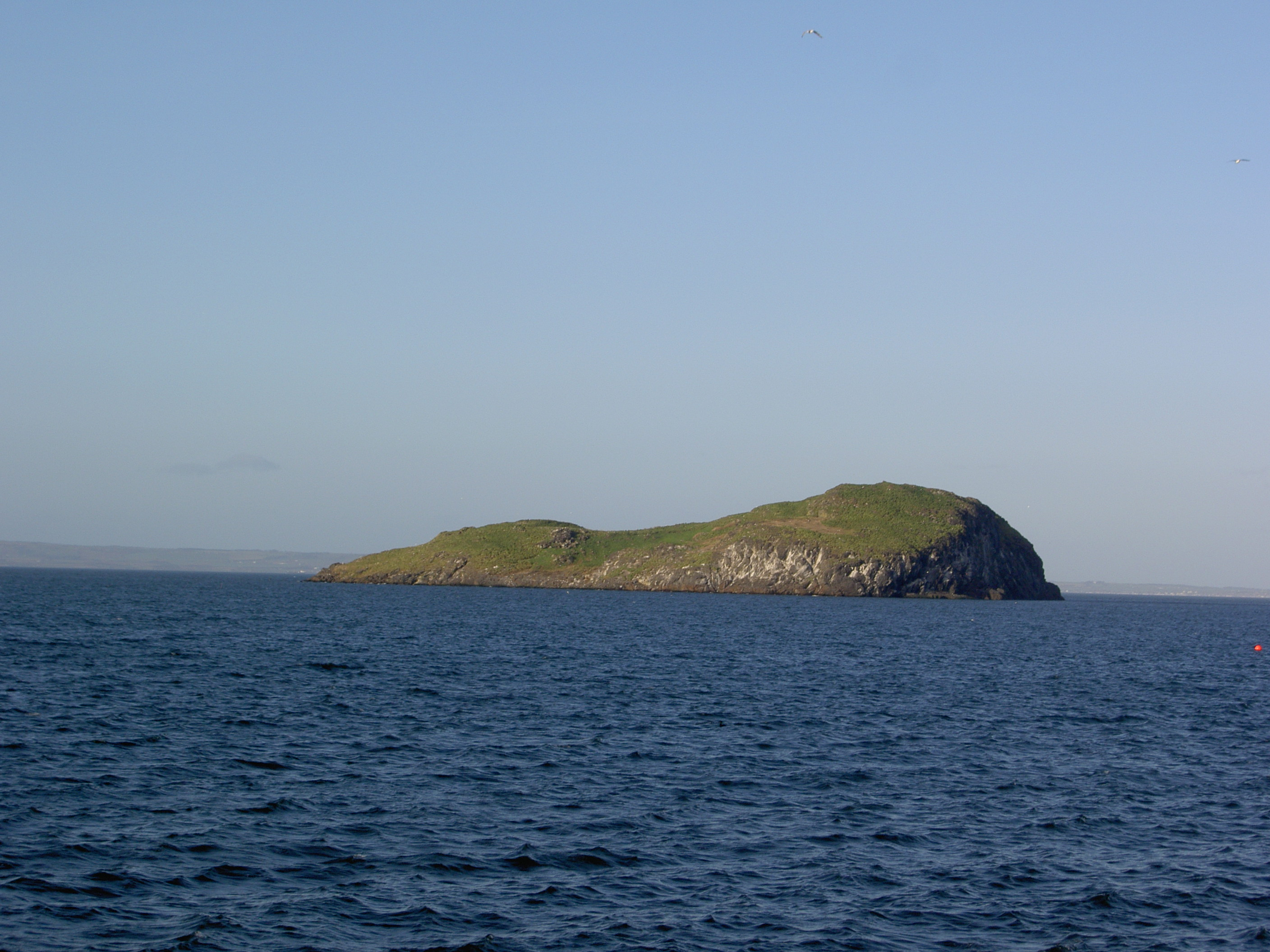
Craigleith from North Berwick harbour

Craigleith lies close to North Berwick's harbour and historically was used as a rabbit warren. The rabbits were bred for food but they were wiped out by myxomatosis in the 1950s. The Atlantic puffin colony on Craigleith, once one of the largest in Britain with 28,000 pairs, became endangered from 1999 onward, due to invasion of non-endemic tree mallow, which choked the puffins' burrows, preventing them from rearing their pufflings. A five-year project, SOS Puffin, led by the Scottish Seabird Centre at North Berwick, was launched early in 2007. Since then, hundreds of volunteers have been working hard to rid the island of the problem, ferried out by boat from the Seabird Centre during the winter months, when the puffins are at sea. There are signs that the puffins are starting to return to the island to breed. Fidra, Inchmickery and Eyebroughy are RSPB reserves, the last being noted for its cormorants. Over 240 species of bird and 60 varieties of seaweed have been recorded on the Isle of May.

== History ==
Several of the islands contain pre-historic remains created by cultures whose names are unknown. They have also been affected by the successive influences of Celtic, Norse and English-speaking peoples during the historic period and this is reflected in their names. The islands also came under attack from Vikings during the early Historic period.

=== 15th century ===
During the reign of King James IV Inchkeith was the site of an extraordinary experiment. According to the historian Robert Lyndsay of Pitscottie, in 1493 James directed that a dumb woman and two infants be transported to the island, to ascertain which language the infants would grow up to speak when isolated from the rest of the world. It was thought that this would be the "original" language, or language of God. There is no reliable account of how the infants spoke although Lyndsay of Pitscottie reported that "some say they spoke good Hebrew".

In 1497 Inchkeith and Inchgarvie were used as an isolated refuge for victims of syphilis and in 1589, history repeated itself when Inchkeith was used to quarantine the passengers of a plague-ridden ship. (More plague sufferers came from the mainland in 1609 and in 1799, Russian sailors who died of an infectious disease were buried there.)

Inchcolm is mentioned in Shakespeare's Macbeth where it is described as "Saint Colmes ynch".

=== English garrisons ===
Inchcolm was raided by English troops during the 14th century Wars of Independence. In the 16th century Inchkeith, Inchcolm and Inchgarvie all suffered English occupation. The Earl of Somerset garrisoned the islands in 1547 after the Battle of Pinkie Cleugh. His force of marines were ordered to reinforce Inchkeith, and they built a large square fort, with corner towers, on the site of the present day lighthouse. His forces, mainly Italian mercenaries, were ejected by a combined Franco-Scottish force under General D’ Essé in 1549.

=== Later fortifications ===
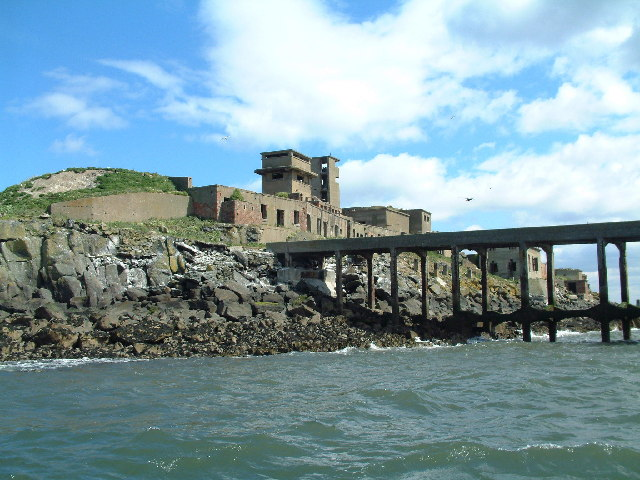
Jetty and fortifications on Inchmickery

Only Inchcolm was fortified during the Napoleonic wars. Inchkeith was fortified (along with Kinghorn) in 1880. Inchgarvie was armed early in the 20th century. In the First World War and the Second World War Inchmickery, Inchcolm and Cramond Island formed part of a defensive line of guns covering anti-submarine booms across the river. There is no evidence to support the popular belief that the defensive structures on Inchmickery were designed to make the island look like a battleship from a distance: the structures were placed to provide the best fields of fire for the guns, and to squeeze in as much accommodation as possible for the garrison. These buildings were later used for filming scenes of the film Complicity.

=== Ecclesiastical associations ===
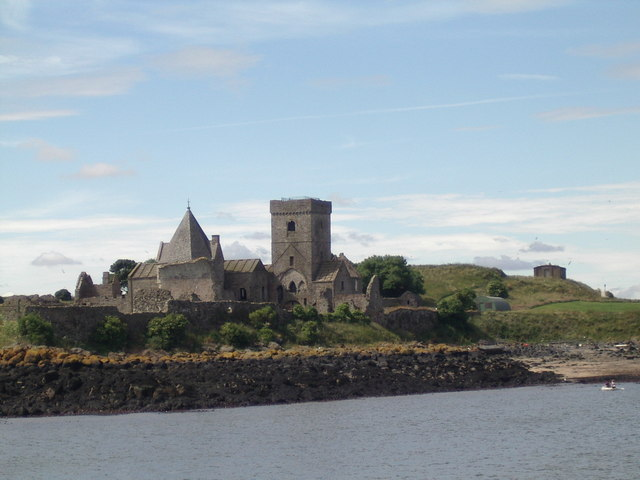
Inchcolm Abbey

Many of the islands were said to have Culdee connections, and had chapels on them. Various saints also have connections with the islands. St Thaney or Thenaw was reputedly the mother of St Kentigern and is said to have been cast adrift in an oarless coracle in deep waters beyond the Isle of May by her father King Leudonus, which resulted in an abundance of fish in the seas nearby. St Adrian of May was murdered there by invading Danes in 870 (who killed St Monance in the same raid). He was buried in a stone coffin on the island but is said to have floated across the Firth before coming to rest in a churchyard at Anstruther. The Isle of May has a long history of ecclesiastical activity and there are various remains including that of a 13th-century Benedictine church.

The Irish missionary Saint Baldred of Tyninghame resided on The Bass in the 8th century and there is a ruined 12th century chapel on Fidra dedicated to St Nicholas. Inchcolm has connections to St Columba and King Alexander I was marooned on the island, and decided to make it the site of an Augustinian monastery. In the 7th century St Adomnán of Iona founded a "school of the prophets" on Inchkeith in the late 7th century having met St Serf there. Inchmickery's name may be derived from the Gaelic for "island of the vicar".

== Navigation ==
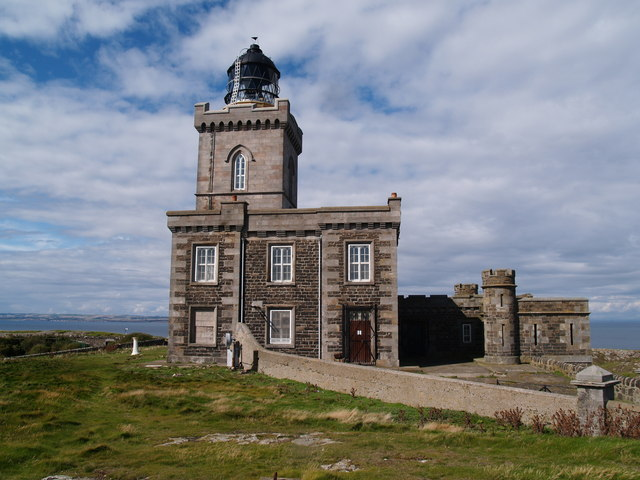
The lighthouse on the Isle of May

Many of the isles act as an aid to navigation. There are various lighthouses and numerous devices to guide shipping in the busy waters near the ports of Leith and Rosyth.

In 1803, construction was begun of Inchkeith Lighthouse, designed and built by Thomas Smith and Robert Stevenson. The lighthouse stands 67 metres high and was operational by 1804. The Fidra light was built in 1885 and automated in 1970.

The light on the small rock of Oxcars was automated as early as 1894. At that time it was controlled by a clockwork timer and was powered using gas delivered weekly from Granton gasworks. A lighthouse was constructed on the Bass Rock in 1902.

The Isle of May light has a long history having been in operation since 1635 when a crude coal-fired structure was erected. The existing building was constructed in 1816, which was converted to a "rock station" in 1972 and automated in March 1989. The island is owned by the Commissioners of the Northern Lights although managed by Scottish Natural Heritage as a national nature reserve.

None of the islands are accessible by public transport except Inchcolm, which has a regular summer service.

== List ==
| Island | Gaelic Name | Meaning of name | Location | Area (ha) | Highest point | Last inhabited |
|---|---|---|---|---|---|---|
| Alloa Inch | Unknown | Alloa island | grid reference NS871915 | c. 33 | <5 | 20th century? |
| Bass Rock | Unknown | Possibly from Gaelic bathais, meaning "forehead". | grid reference NT602874 | 7.5 | 107 | 1970s |
| Craigleith | Creag Lìte | Rock of Leith | grid reference NT555868 | 5 | 24 | Inhabitation unlikely |
| Cramond Island | Unknown | island of the fort on the Almond river (Note: Mac an Tàilleir (2003) provides no name for the island itself but states that "Cramond" is from the Brythonic Caramond meaning "fort on the Almond".) | grid reference NT194785 | 7.7 | 28 | Possibly World War II |
| Fidra | Unknown | From the Norse for "feather island" | grid reference NT513868 | 10 | 20 | 1970 |
| Inchcolm | Innis Choluim | Calum/Malcolm or Columba's island | grid reference NT189824 | 9 | 34 | First decade of the 21st century |
| Inchgarvie | Innis Garbhach | rough island | grid reference NT136795 | 0.83 | 19 | Probably World War II |
| Inchkeith | Possibly Innis Cheith or Innis Coit. (Note: Recorded as "Insula Keth" in the 12th century Life of Saint Serf. Mac an Tàilleir (2003) and Watson (1926) suggest that the root is the Brthyonic "coed". The derivation would appear to be assumed rather than attested and the modern form is Innis Cheith.) | wooded island | grid reference NT294825 | 20 | 59 | 1986 |
| Inchmickery | Possibly Innis nam Bhiocaire | Possibly "island of the vicar" | grid reference NT207803 | <5 | 14 | Probably World War II |
| Lamb | Unknown | From a common Norse name for a small island | grid reference NT536867 | 0.5 | 15 | Inhabitation unlikely |
| Isle of May | Eilean Mhàigh | Possibly "gull island" | grid reference NT653996 | 45 | 50 | 1989 |
| Tullibody Inch | Unknown | Tullibody island | grid reference NS862925 | 6 | <5 | Unknown |

=== Outer ===
The Isle of May is in the north of the outer Firth of Forth, about 8 kilometres (5.0 mi) off the coast of mainland Fife. It is 1.8 kilometres (1.1 mi) long, less than 0.5 kilometres (0.31 mi) wide and has a total area of 45 hectares (110 acres) making it by far the largest of the Forth islands. Although often inhabited in the past nobody has been recorded as living there since the automation of the lighthouse. Rona is a tidal islet to the north joined to the main island by a bridge. Further north are North Ness, the Mars Rocks and Norman Rock. Clett and the Middens are stacks to the east and The Pillow is a skerry to the south east. Maiden Rocks and Maiden Hair lie just offshore to the south.

The Bass Rock is about 2 kilometres (1.2 mi) offshore, and 5 kilometres (3.1 mi) north-east of North Berwick. This steep-sided island is currently uninhabited, but was lived on for many centuries. It has a castle dating from the 14th century, which was later used as a prison and there are the remains of a chapel built circa 1491. The Lauder family owned the island for almost six centuries, and it now belongs to Sir Hew Dalrymple whose family purchased it in 1701. The rock features in various works of fiction, including Robert Louis Stevenson's Catriona. At 7.5 hectares (19 acres) in extent the Bass Rock is the second largest of the islands of the Forth. The Middens is a small stack that lies just offshore to the northwest.

Craigleith lies north of North Berwick harbour. It was also purchased by Sir Hew Dalrymple, from North Berwick Town Council in 1814.

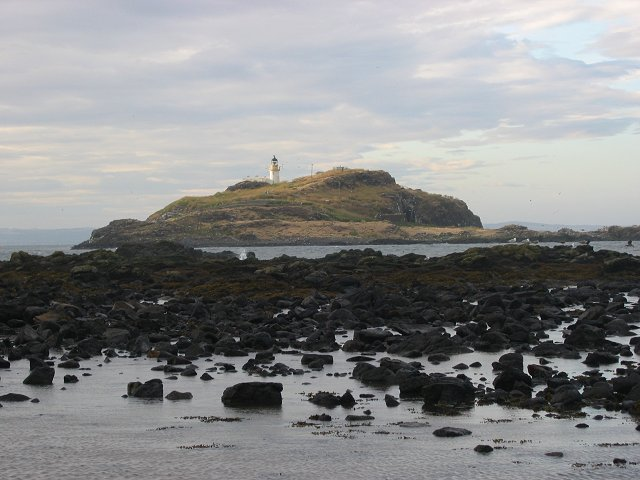
Fidra

The Lamb is an uninhabited island about 100m long by 50m wide, flanked by the skerries North Dog and South Dog. There are other skerries between it and the shore including Bubbly Buss, the Law Rocks and the Hummel Ridges. In February 2009, the island was bought by the Israeli paranormalist Uri Geller for £30,000.

Fidra, archaically Fetheray, is 4 kilometres (2.5 mi) north-west of North Berwick. Like the nearby islands it is the result of volcanic activity and has a substantial seabird population. It can be accessed via a primitive jetty on the eastern shore. It is said that R. L. Stevenson based his map of Treasure Island on the shape of Fidra. The island is also attended by companion islets called North Dog and South Dog and Castle Tarbet is another islet to the south separated from the main bulk at high tides.

=== Inner ===
Inchkeith is close to the shores of Fife. Its history has been dominated by religion, its use as a quarantine and military events (see above). It is currently owned by Tom Farmer, founder of Kwikfit, although he doesn't live there.

Inchmickery lies about 8 kilometres (5.0 mi) east of Inchkeith and it is about 3.5 kilometres (2.2 mi) north of the city of Edinburgh. It is only about 100 metres by 200 metres in size. Rocks known as the Cow and Calf lie to the north and beyond that, about halfway to Inchcolm, are the Oxcars, a hazard identified by a permanent light.

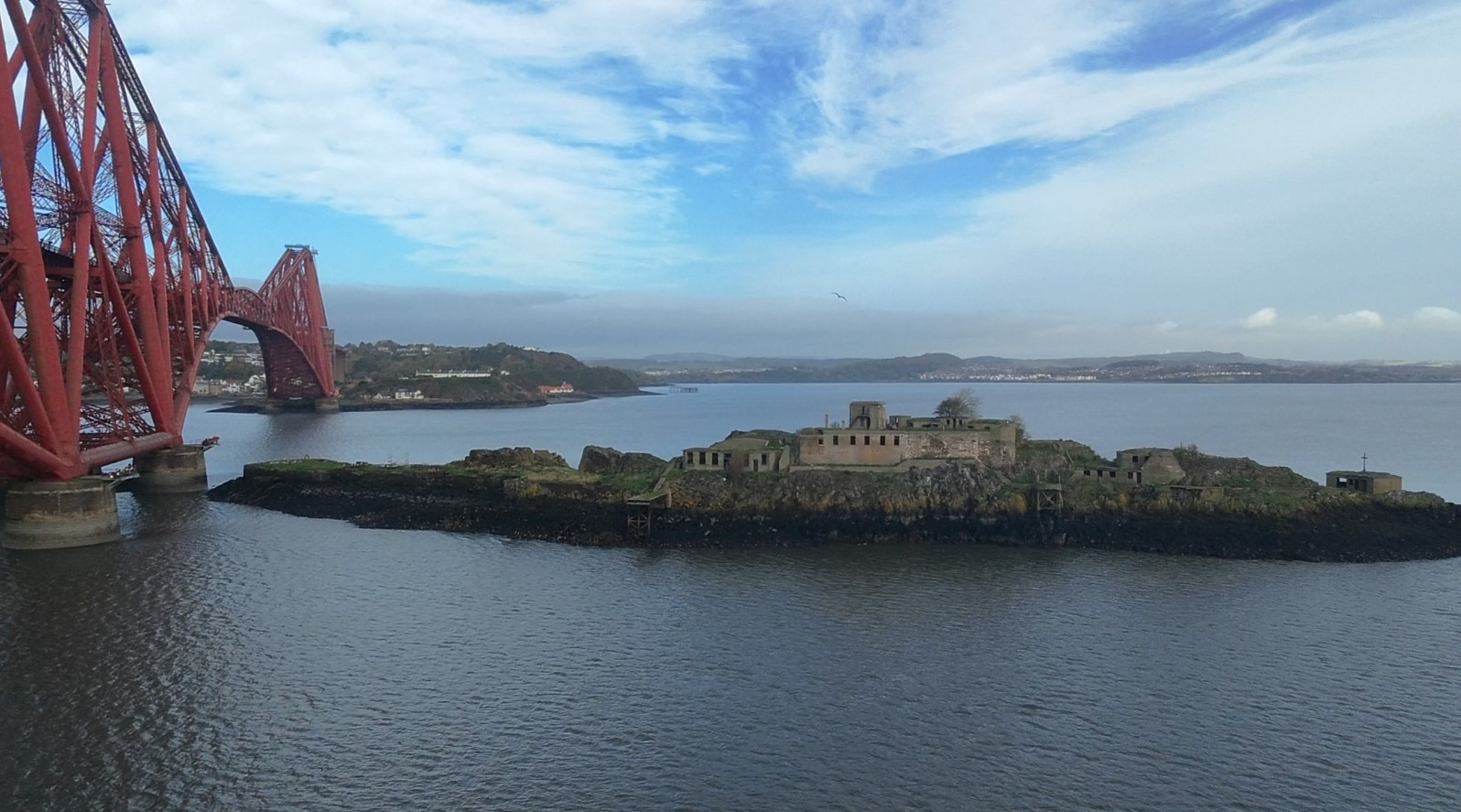
Inchgarvie Island, showing position and size relative to the Forth Bridge.

Incholm is the only island in the Firth with a recent resident population, of whom there were two in the 2001 census although there was no usually resident population recorded at the time of the 2011 census. There is a resident custodian employed by Historic Scotland who maintains the island and runs the shop during the summer. In the 14th century John of Fordun records the name as "Euomonia" (referring to the monasterium Sancti Columbe in insula Euomonia). There are various skerries in the sea to the north including Swallow Craig, Car Craig, Meadulse and Craigdimas.

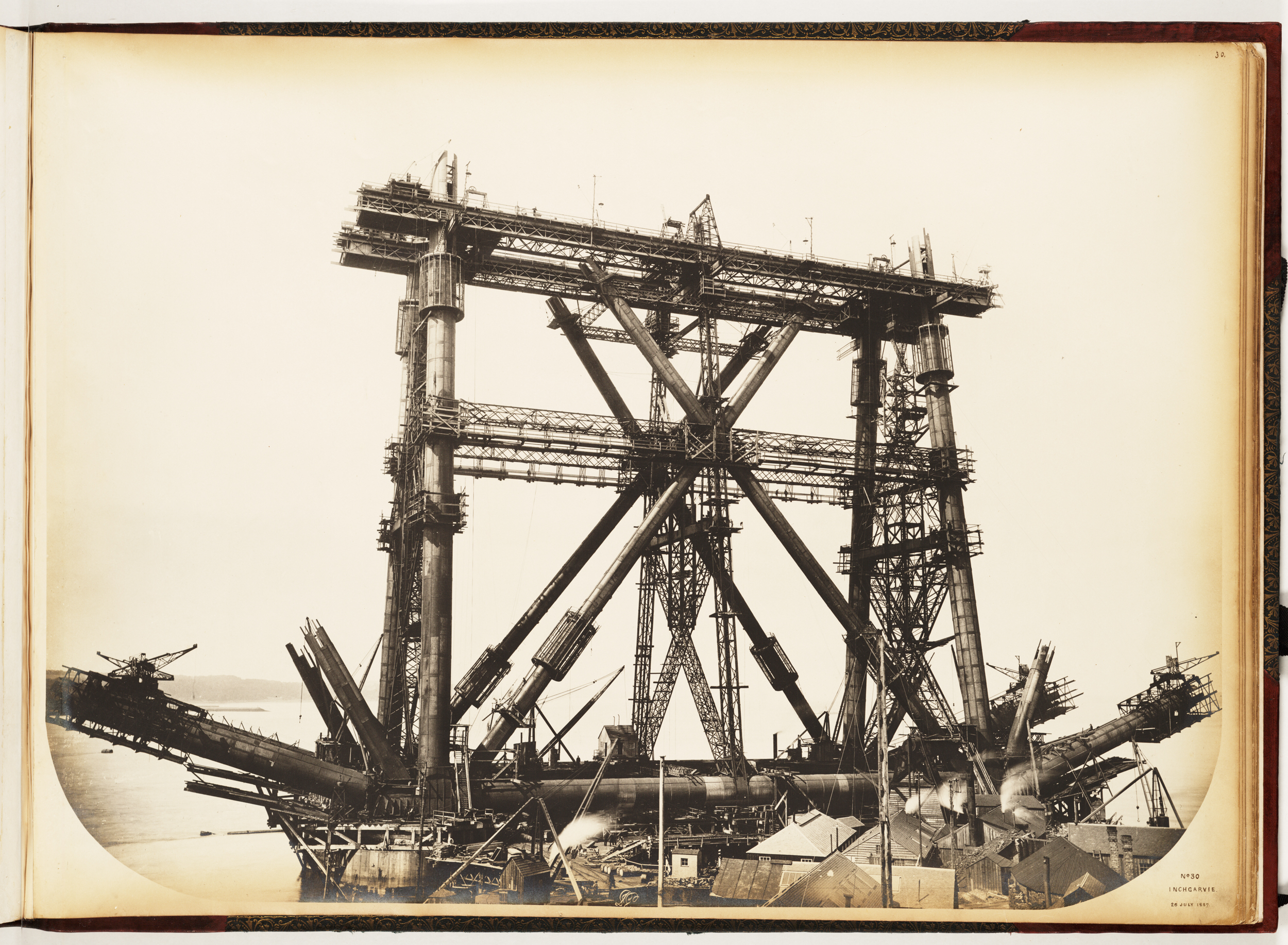
Construction of the Inchgarvie cantilever of the Forth Bridge

Inchgarvie's name is from Innis Gharbhaidh which is Scottish Gaelic for "rough island" or possibly "Garbhach's island". This island has a long history of fortification and is now incorporated into the Forth Bridge. In 1878, foundations for Thomas Bouch's Forth Bridge were laid on Inchgarvie but after the Tay Bridge Disaster these plans were abandoned. When construction of the bridge recommenced in 1882, the west end of the island was extended with a pier and used as the foundation for one of the cantilevers. The island was also used for a construction office and the castle buildings were re-roofed to accommodate workers. Some of the stone from the former castle was used to build the caissons of the bridge.

Cramond Island in the Almond estuary is a tidal island that is 7.7 hectares (19 acres) in extent and is currently part of the Dalmeny Estate. It lies about a mile from the shore and is a popular recreation area. The speed with which the water rises can catch visitors unawares, leaving them stranded.

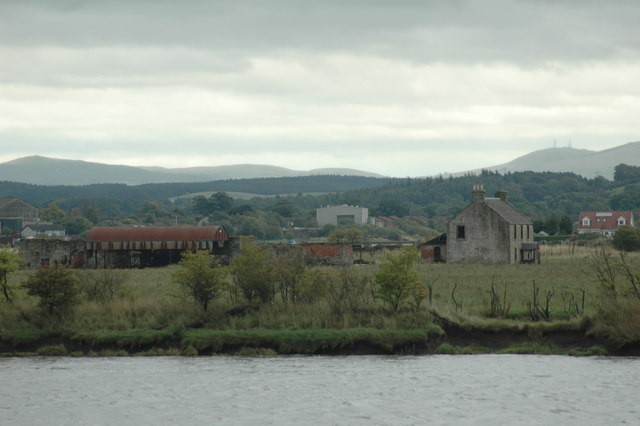
The ruins on Alloa Inch

Alloa Inch is an island in the tidal reaches of the River Forth near Alloa that consists of reed beds and salt marshes. There is a derelict farmhouse on the island and the Scottish Wildlife Trust has managed the island as a nature reserve since 1996. Just upstream is the smaller Tullibody Inch – both are part of the Firth of Forth SSSI, which also includes the John Muir Country Park.

=== Smaller and former ===
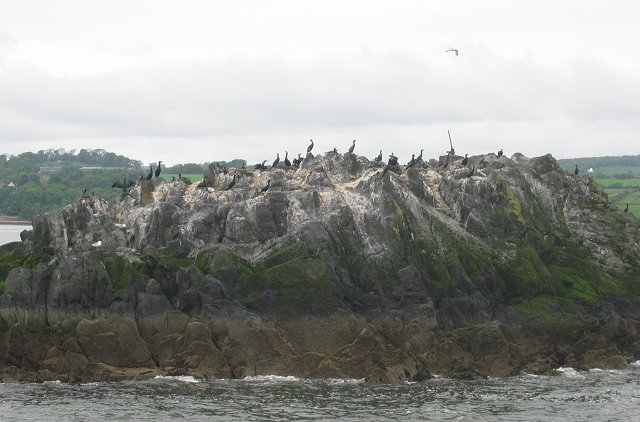
Haystack rock off Inchcolm

There are various other small islets and skerries in the Firth. Along the north shore, from west to east, Preston Island near Culross is an artificial former island. This reclaimed land was created c. 1800 for salt production. More land was then reclaimed using ash slurry from Longannet power station from 1970 onward and it is now part of the mainland. Just offshore are the Craigmore Rocks at grid reference NT001845, which were called "Kraig Maur" in Blaeu's Atlas. "Dow Kraig" on the same 17th century map appears to be under reclaimed land just along the coast south of Dunsyre House at grid reference NT116817 Nearby Rosyth Castle is a former tidal island and Long Craig is now part of the Forth Road Bridge.

There is another Long Craig south of Dalgety Bay and Haystack lies between it and Inchcolm. The Common Rocks are in Silversands Bay at Aberdour and West Vows, East Vows and another Long Craig lie off Kirkcaldy. Much farther along the coast there is another West Vows and East Vows at Earlsferry. The Carr Brigs are a hazard to shipping at the entrance to the Firth just off Fife Ness.

There are fewer skerries on the south coast of the Firth. Little Ox lies off Musselburgh and the Black Rocks, including the Middle and Eastern Craigs lie just outside the Port of Leith.

== See also ==
- Scottish island names
- Lamba – an island in Shetland
- Sula Sgeir, an islet in the North Atlantic from which the men of Ness, Lewis take an annual harvest of young northern gannets.

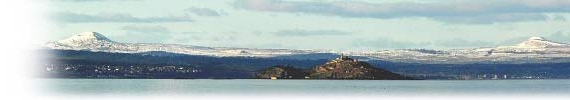
View of a snow-covered Fife, with Inchkeith in the foreground, from Portobello, Edinburgh.

== References and footnotes ==
=== General references ===
- Haswell-Smith, Hamish (2004). The Scottish Islands. Edinburgh: Canongate. ISBN 978-1-84195-454-7.
- Howell, Henry Hyatt; Geikie, Archibald; and Salter, John William (1861) The Geology of the Neighbourhood of Edinburgh (Map 32). London. The Geological Survey of Great Britain.
- Keay, J. & Keay, J. (1994) Collins Encyclopaedia of Scotland. London: HarperCollins. ISBN 0-00-255082-2
- Martine, John (1890) Reminiscences and Notices of the Fourteen Parishes of the County of Haddington. Edinburgh: ISBN 1-897857-19-5
- Iain Mac an Tàilleir. "Placenames" (PDF). Pàrlamaid na h-Alba. Archived from the original (PDF) on 29 May 2008.
- Ordnance Survey (2009) "Get-a-map". Retrieved 5–30 September 2010.
- Watson, W. J. (1994) The Celtic Place-Names of Scotland. Edinburgh: Birlinn. ISBN 1-84158-323-5. First published 1926.
