= Inchgarvie =

Uninhabited island in the Firth of Forth, Scotland

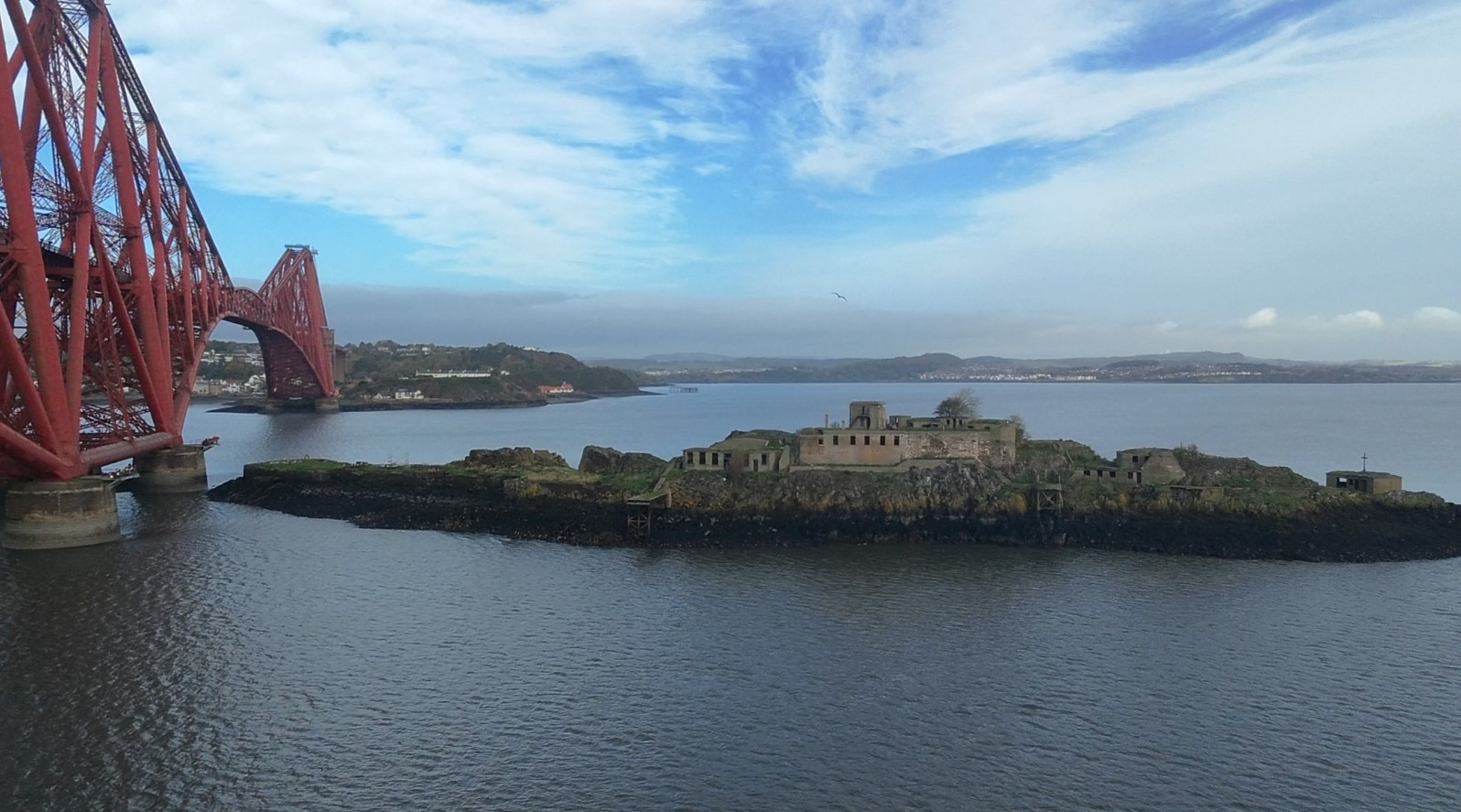
- Inchgarvie Island, showing position and size relative to the Forth Bridge.

Location
- Location within Scotland
- OS grid reference: NT138795
- Coordinates: 56.03°N 3.23°W

Physical geography
- Island group: Firth of Forth
- Area: 0.83 hectares (89,340 sq ft)
- Highest elevation: 19 metres (62 ft)

Administration
- Council area: City of Edinburgh
- Country: Scotland
- Sovereign state: United Kingdom

Designations

Scheduled monument
- Official name: Inch Garvie, Firth of Forth, Defensive Installations
- Type: 20th Century Military and Related: Battery, Secular: fort (non-prehistoric)
- Designated: 19 August 1996
- Reference no.: SM6436

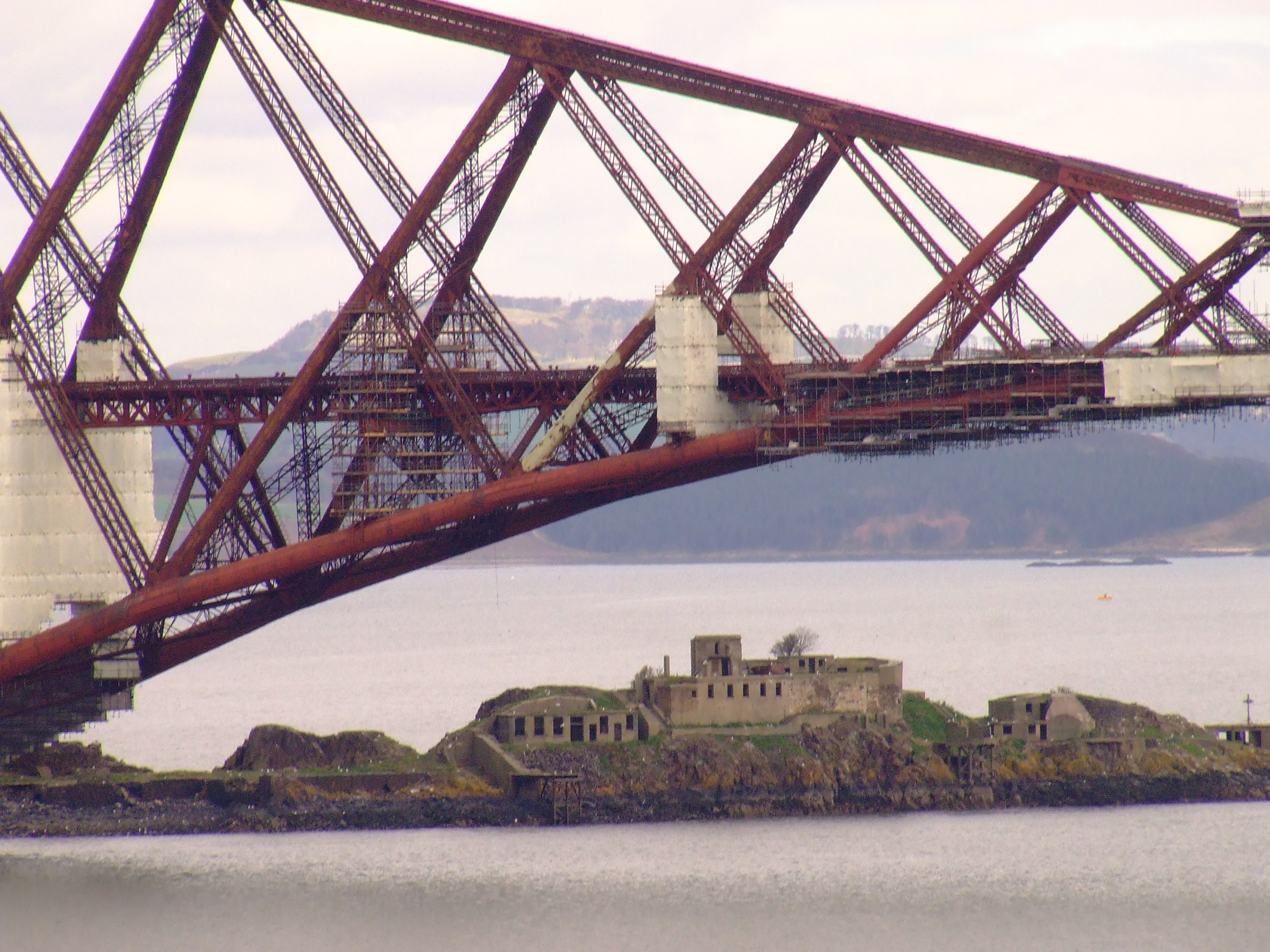
Inchgarvie beneath the Forth Bridge during the latter's maintenance.

Inchgarvie or Inch Garvie is a small, uninhabited island in the Firth of Forth. On the rocks around the island sit four caissons that make up the foundations of the Forth Bridge.

Inchgarvie's fortifications pre-date the modern period. In the days when boats were the only way to cross the Firth of Forth, the island was on the main route between North Queensferry in Fife and South Queensferry in Lothian. This made it strategically important. Although now uninhabited, Inchgarvie has been inhabited throughout various periods of history. The first recorded time was in the late 15th century.

Like nearby Inchmickery, its profile and colour makes it look like a small warship from a distance. It was armed with coast defence guns from 1901 until 1906, and again from 1908 until the 1930s.

== Etymology ==
Inchgarvie's name is Gaelic in origin and means either "rough island" (from innis garbh) or "island of the rough place" (from innis gharbhaidh). An older theory links it to the Scots word "garvie", which refers to the sprat. A commercial sprat fishery took place in the inner Forth until it was prohibited in 1983.

== History ==
Records of Danish attacks on nearby islands, particularly Inchcolm as well as Fife and Lothian may mean that it was used in some capacity by them.

The island was licensed by King James IV to John Dundas of Dundas (Note: Other sources suggest it was his father, Sir Archibald Dundas) with the power to build a fort on 20 March 1491. John Dundas did not build the castle, and James IV himself ordered a strong tower to be built in 1513.

On 8 March 1514 Margaret, the widow of William Dundas of Dundas, undertook to manage the completion of the fortress that James IV and her father-in-law had begun building on her island. From 23 December 1514, Charles Dennison, Captain of Inchgarvie managed and fed a large royal construction team. The master mason was John of Cumbernauld, with his "servitor" John Strathauchin, who directed eight other masons and ten labourers. Margaret, Lady of Dundas gave them two boats. Two 'serpentine' guns and guns from Colstone were placed on the island after a visit by artillery experts in July 1515, and the island was equipped with a "blawing horne." There was also a chapel. The Duke of Albany installed a French garrison in November 1521. The Laird of Dundas was paid £33 for repairing the fortress in March 1533.

The fort was captured by Richard Brooke in the Galley Subtile on 6 May 1544 during an attack on Edinburgh and demolished a week later. The English commander Lord Hertford wrote that it would have been useful to garrison Inchgarvie, but his orders from Henry VIII would not allow it. In 1547, after the Battle of Pinkie Cleugh, Inchcolm and Inchkeith were fortified by the English, and held for two years; it is possible that Inchgarvie was fortified at this period too.

=== Prison ===
Between 1519 and 1671, the castle was used as a prison, and in 1580 Inchkeith and Inchgarvie were made a place of exile for the plague-stricken by order of the Privy Council. On 6 September 1627, the Laird of Dundas was invited to meet the Privy Council at South Queensferry and discuss building a modern fort on the island. Like Inchkeith, Inchgarvie had a quarantine hospital, and a prison. Oliver Cromwell had this demolished.

During the reign of Charles II as King of Scots, the island was subject to continued maintenance for defensive purposes. The island was inspected by Charles in 1651 before falling into disrepair after his army was defeated by Oliver Cromwell at the Battle of Worcester.

In 1707 the island is known to have been rented to Archibald Primrose, 1st Earl of Rosebery. In 1779, however, the island's fortifications were renewed once more, in response to the threat posed by John Paul Jones, American Naval Commander, who harassed British ships from a base in the Forth. These fortifications were never used in anger.

During the Napoleonic period, the threat from the sea meant gun batteries were created in 1806.

=== Forth Bridge ===
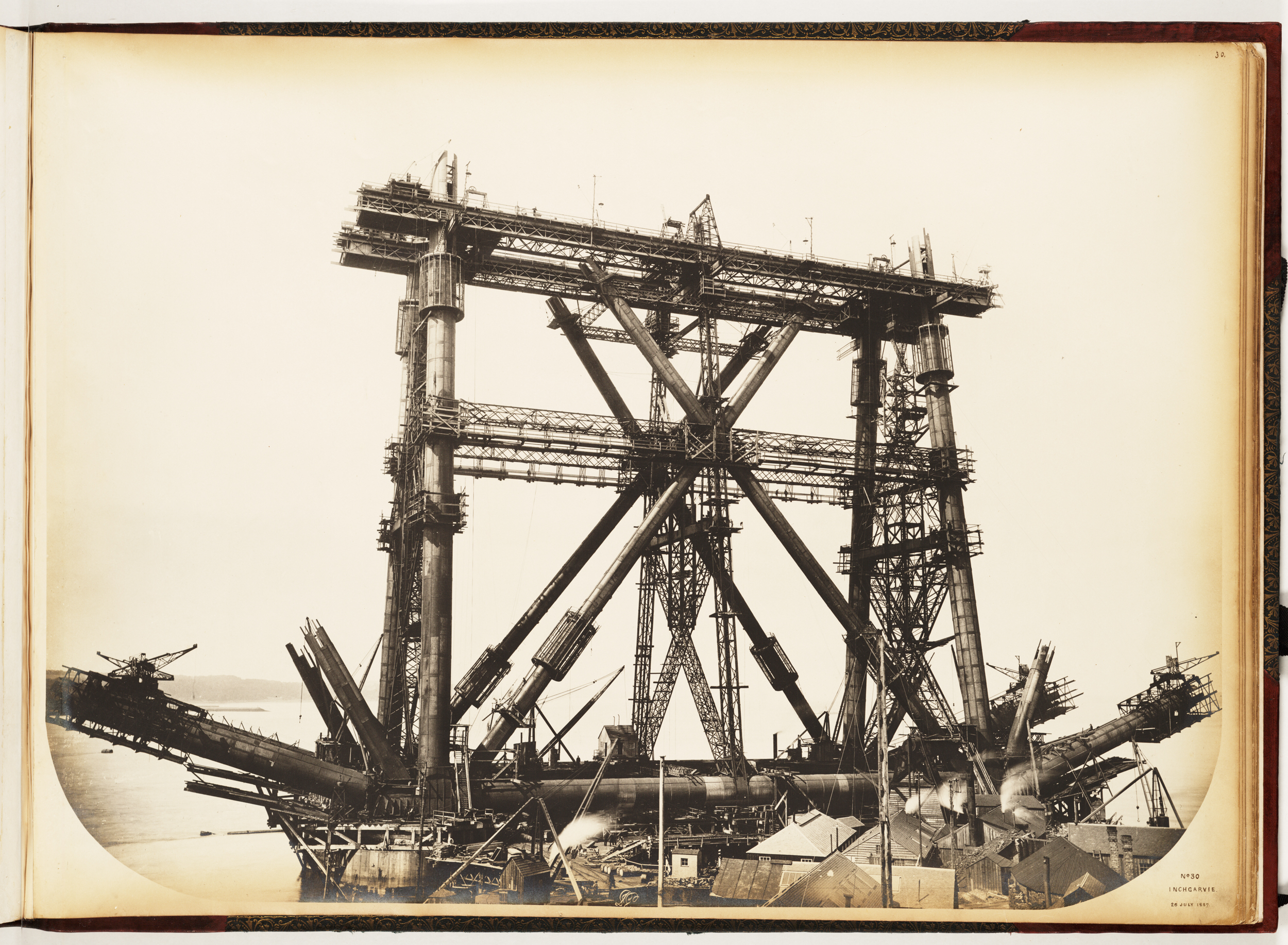
Construction of the Inchgarvie cantilever of the Forth Bridge

In 1878 the foundations for Thomas Bouch's Forth Bridge were laid on Inchgarvie (and their bricks remain), but after the Tay Bridge Disaster, these plans were abandoned, and the island languished until the west end of the island was extended with a pier, and used as the foundation for one of the Forth Bridge's cantilevers. The island, due to its proximity to the bridge, was also used as a construction office for the bridge, as well as accommodation for its workers within the re-roofed castle buildings. Some of the stone from the former castle was used to help build the caissons of the Forth Bridge.

=== Defence operations ===
The island became of renewed importance to the security of the Firth of Forth at the beginning of the 20th century. It was armed with two 12-pdr guns in 1901, in conjunction with gun emplacements on the mainland to the north (at North Queensferry) and to the south (at Dalmeny). Although the island's guns were removed from the approved armament in 1906, they were re-instated in 1908. The number of guns was increased to four in the early months of the First World War. The island's guns were removed from the approved armament of the Forth in the early 1930s.

The guns may have survived for drill and practice until the beginning of the Second World War, during which the island was armed only with machine guns. The island's defences were intended (until 1905) to cover the controlled minefield laid across the river and later to tackle fast-moving torpedo boats attempting to enter the naval anchorage above the Forth Bridge or to damage the lock gates of the Rosyth Dockyard.

== Geology ==
Inchgarvie is of igneous origin, and partly made up of picrite. Studies of the landscape beneath the waters of the firth have revealed that the visible surface of Inchgarvie is only the top of a larger crag and tail structure similar in structure to Edinburgh Castle and the Royal Mile created by glacial action.

== See also ==
- List of islands of Scotland
