= Dirleton =

Village in East Lothian, Scotland

Coordinates: 56.048°N 2.785°W

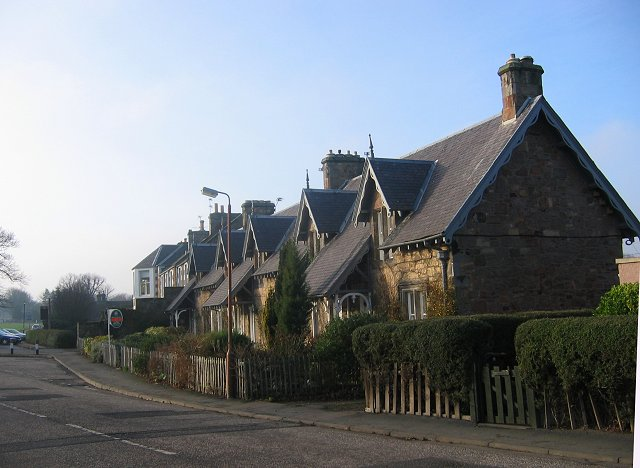
- A row of cottages opposite the castle

- Location within East Lothian
- Population: (2020)
- OS grid reference: NT511841
- Council area: East Lothian
- Lieutenancy area: East Lothian
- Country: Scotland
- Sovereign state: United Kingdom
- Post town: NORTH BERWICK
- Postcode district: EH39
- Dialling code: 01620
- Police: Scotland
- Fire: Scottish
- Ambulance: Scottish
- UK Parliament: East Lothian
- Scottish Parliament: East Lothian

Dirleton is a village and civil parish in East Lothian, Scotland approximately 20 miles (32 km) east of Edinburgh on the A198. It contains 7,500 acres (30 km^{2}). Dirleton lies between North Berwick (east), Gullane (west), Fenton Barns (south) and the Yellowcraigs nature reserve, Archerfield Estate and the Firth of Forth (north). Gullane parish was joined to Dirleton parish in 1612 by an Act of Parliament because "Golyn (as it was anciently spelt) is ane decaying toun, and Dirleton is ane thriven place."

== Locale ==
Dirleton has two hotels, The Castle Inn which looks on to the village green and The Open Arms Hotel. Other visitor attractions today include the Dirleton Gallery, now closed for business, Archerfield Links recently built with two 18-hole golf courses and hotel. The church (presumably built soon after the move of the parish in 1612) and manse (1708) of Dirleton stand immediately to the north of the village in a beautiful situation. The church has extensive Victorian renovations (1836 including the ornate tower), and a churchyard. it has a population of about 3300. The churchyard contains an odd stone of 1746 to a George Seton, including two stern-faced mermaid caryatids. The school is by John Alexander Carfrae (1910) who built many Edinburgh schools. Trinitarian friars had a friary here prior to the reformation.

== Two Weeks in September ==
The 1967 British-French film Two Weeks in September (À cœur joie) was partly filmed in the area. The film starred Brigitte Bardot and Laurent Terzieff and was directed by Serge Bourguignon. Scenes for the film were shot on location in Dirleton Castle and on the beach at Gullane in September 1966. The principal cast stayed at the Open Arms Hotel in Dirleton.

== Castle ==
Dirleton is notable for Dirleton Castle, a well-preserved medieval fortress, which today belongs to Historic Scotland. It is the caput of the feudal barony of Dirleton, said to be one of the oldest in Scotland (This barony did not, however, cover the entire parish). It was built in the middle of the twelfth century by a branch of the Anglo-Norman family of De Vaux, a family with its origins in Rouen, Normandy, which had settled at Dirleton during the reign of King Malcolm IV (1153–1165). They also held the manor of Golyn (Gullane) and parts of the lands of Fenton. In 1225, it is described as a "castellum". In 1298 when King Edward I of England invaded Scotland, no place was able to resist him except Dirleton castle. After a resolute resistance it surrendered to forces under Antony Bek, Bishop of Durham. It was still in English possession in 1306. When Cromwell invaded Scotland in 1650 the castle was, after a gallant defence, taken by Lambert and by him partially dismantled and reduced to its present ruinous state.

The heiress of William de Vaux, Lord of Dirleton, brought the barony and estates to her husband, Sir John de Haliburton, about 1430. Their grandson, Sir Walter de Haliburton, High Treasurer of Scotland, was created a Lord of Parliament in 1447. This family failed in the male line and an heiress took Dirleton to her husband, Lord Ruthven, grandfather of the Earl of Gowrie who was forfeited in 1600. The barony then graduated to a number of proprietors during the corrupt 17th century. Finally, Sir John Nisbet, Lord Dirleton (d. 1688), a Senator of the College of Justice acquired it in 1663 and the barony remained with this family into the 20th century. In 1923 the Nisbet family donated the castle to Historic Scotland.

== Congalton ==
The feudal barony of Congalton gave its name (or vice versa) to a very ancient family that subsisted in a part of Dirleton parish for twenty generations in the male line. The first on record, Robert de Congaltoun, witnessed a charter of Richard de Morville, Constable of Scotland, circa 1162. However, whether or not the family were then the lairds is called into question by the burial at North Berwick in May 1311 of Sir Robert de Lawedre (Lauder), where the inscription stated: "here lies the good Robert Lauedre the greate Laird of Congaltoun and The Bass Maii MCCCXI". Sir John de Congaltoun of that Ilk appears to be in possession as laird just a few years later when he recorded a mortification dated 13 December 1314.

The elder branch of the family succeeded through heiresses to the estates of Hepburn of Keith, in Humbie parish, and Riccart of Riccarton, in Kincardineshire. Robert Hepburn Congalton of Keith and Congalton, the 18th generation of the family, sold Congalton to his brother who became Charles Congalton of that Ilk (died January 1742) and in 1702 had married Janet Lauder (1671–1751), daughter of Sir John Lauder, Lord Fountainhall. Their son William Congalton of that Ilk (died 27 October 1753), who married secondly Mary Bethune (died 1751), daughter of David Bethune, 17th of Balfour, had ten children of whom only three married.

The eldest son Charles Congalton (1736-1768), a captain in the Royal Navy, in 1762 married Anne Elliot, daughter of Sir Gilbert Elliot, 2nd Baronet, of Minto and their two sons inherited their grandmother's estate of Balfour in Fife but did not marry (their sister Eleanor married Colonel John Drinkwater Bethune). A younger son Andrew Congalton (1749-1823), also a captain in the Royal Navy, had a son Charles Congalton who died unmarried in 1827, so ending the male line.

== Islands ==
Three islands, Fidra, Ibris, and the Lamb, belong to the parish of Dirleton. Fidra is the largest, directly opposite the village, and a mile from the shore. Upon it there was once the castle of Tarbet, a possession of the Congalton family. There was also here St. Nicholas's Priory, dating from 1165, the ruins of which still exist. The monks had a ferry from the island to the mainland, from which the farm of Ferrygate takes its name.

== Elbottle ==
A Saxon word signifying "the old dwelling", Elbottle is also within Dirleton parish. Near Archerfield House there was a convent of Cistercian nuns, probably in connection with the large Cistercian nunnery at North Berwick. The Lauder family held lands here also. James Lauder (d. 1631), a great-great-grandson of Robert Lauder of The Bass (d. June 1576) held three husbandlands (78 acres) plus 6 acres (24,000 m^{2}) in Elbottle. His sister Alison was wife to the Minister at Gullane, the Reverend Andrew McGhie.

== Radar Station ==
The radar station at lies just to the north of Dirleton and is one of a handful of Second World War GCI (Ground-controlled interception) Radar complexes that have survived demolition. In the early 1940s it was a site for mobile control and aerial trailers, but because of the continued incursion of night raiders more sophisticated equipment was required to direct friendly fighter aircraft to the enemy and the earlier Chain Home radar network needed to be augmented. The latter was designed to detect incoming waves of German aircraft during daylight and direct British fighters to a point where they could make visual contact (i.e. within a mile or so). In darkness, however, central command had to direct night fighters to within hundreds of metres in order to engage the enemy and the station at Dirleton was constructed as part of a system designed to provide this level of accuracy and control.

The main operations block, often called a Happidrome, was the hub of the complex and it was from here that underground cables ran to the various transmitters and receivers in the surrounding areas. These included height finding equipment, plan and position indicators and machinery for the identification of friend and foe signals sent by incoming aircraft. The information obtained was collated in the operations room and relayed to the fighter stations at Drem and the training unit at Charterhall. Although staff were not billeted at the station it was largely self-sufficient with its own water supply, sewage treatment plant, generator house and telephone exchange. Welfare facilities included canteens, showers and rest rooms. It is clear that in times of emergency the site could have carried on independently of the national grid and, with the blast doors closed and air filtration unit functioning, it could have survived all but the most direct of hits from enemy planes.

In its later life it passed over many of its main functions to other centres but it continued as a training venue until the 1950s. Prior to development of the site a full survey was undertaken by Headland Archaeology and archived at the National Monuments Record of Scotland, it is now a private home.
