= Cramond Island =

Tidal island in the Firth of Forth in eastern Scotland

Eilean Chair Amain (Gaelic)
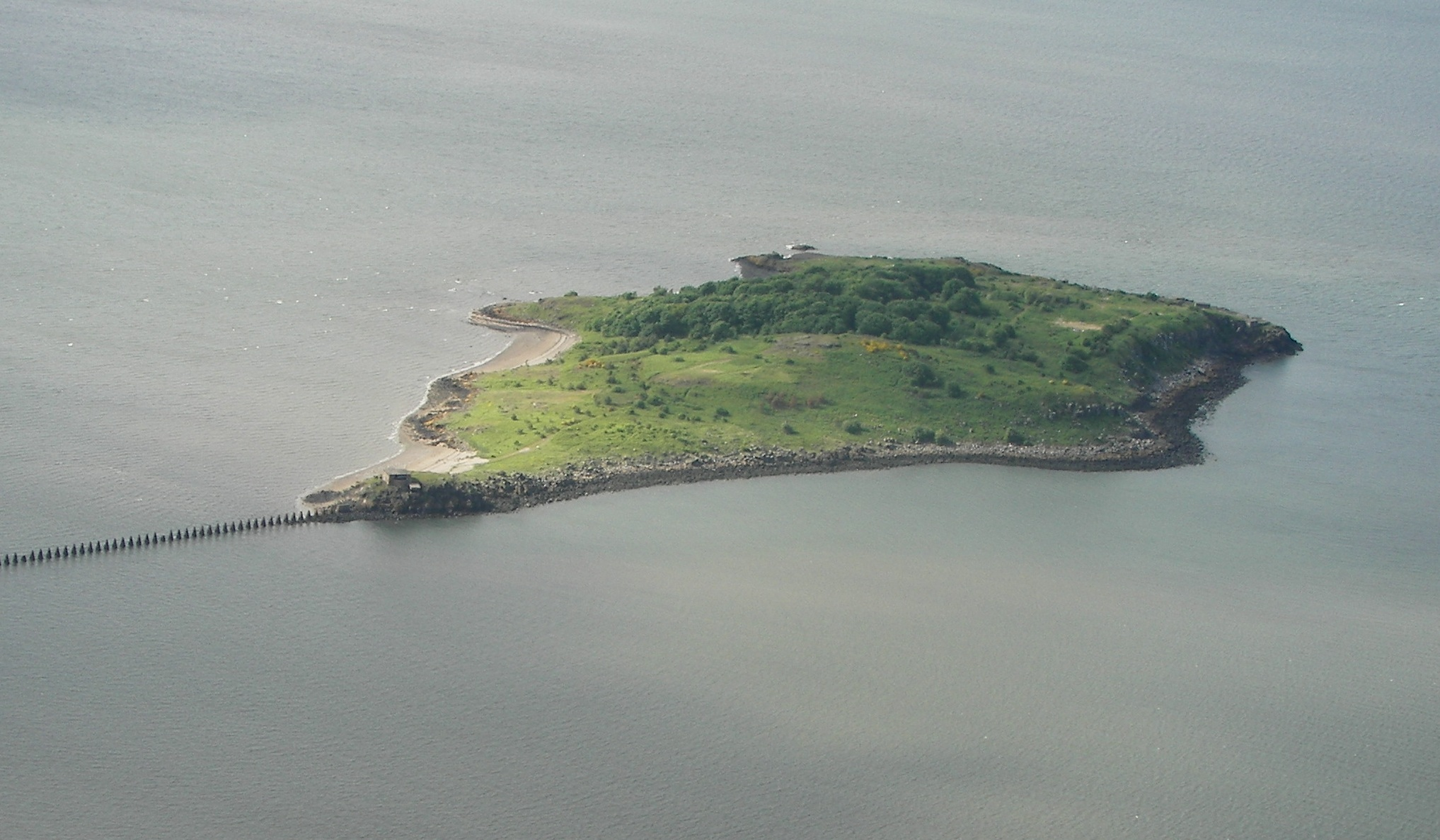
- Cramond Island from the air

Location
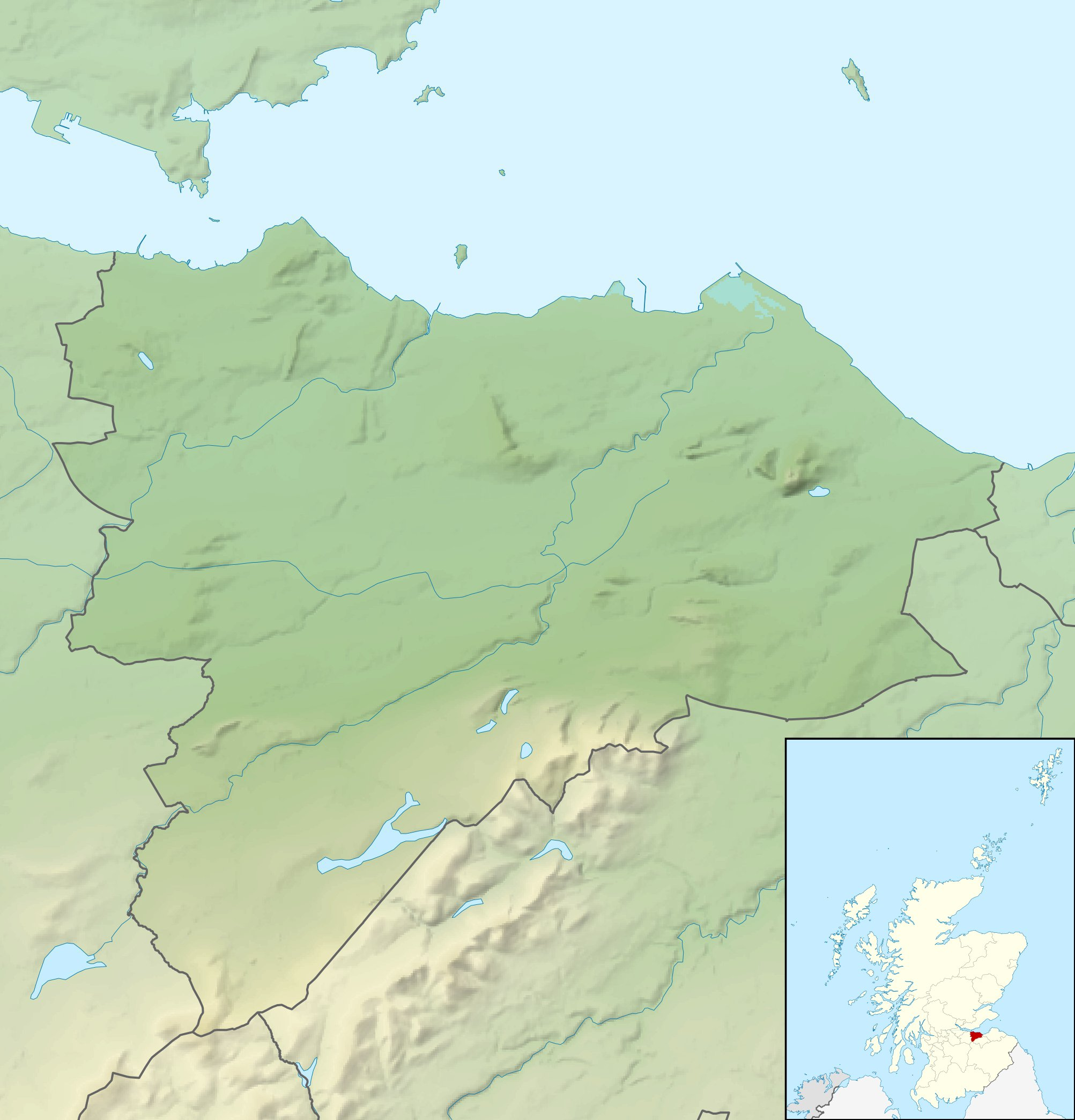
- Location of the island in City of Edinburgh
- Coordinates: 55.99°N 3.29°W

Physical geography
- Island group: Islands of the Forth
- Area: 7.70 ha

Administration
- Country: Scotland
- Sovereign state: United Kingdom

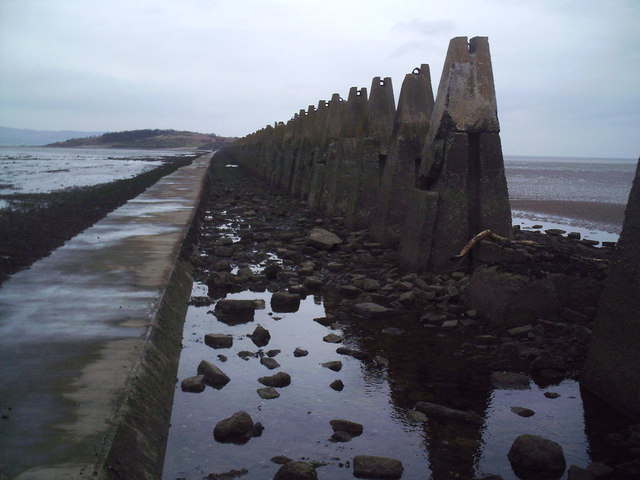
Cramond Island with causeway on left and anti-boat pylons on right

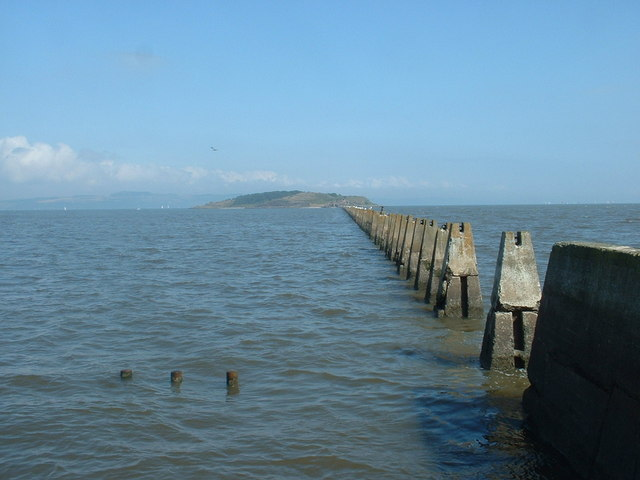
Line of causeway and pylons at high tide

Cramond Island (Scottish Gaelic: Eilean Chair Amain) is one of several islands in the Firth of Forth in eastern Scotland, near Edinburgh. It lies off the foreshore at Cramond. It is 1/3 mile (0.54 km) long and covers 19.03 acres (7.70 ha). The island is part of the Dalmeny Estate, owned by the Rosebery Estates Partnership.

== Geography ==
Cramond Island is a tidal island about one mile (1.6 km) out to sea, which is connected to the mainland at low tide across the Drum Sands. A paved path, exposed at low water, allows easy access. This causeway runs at the foot of a row of concrete pylons on one side of the causeway, which were constructed as an anti-boat boom during the Second World War and are one of the most striking sights in the area. At high tide the path is covered by several feet of seawater which cuts the island off from the mainland. It is safe to walk along the raised causeway to the island at low tide, but only if visitors ensure that they leave enough time to return to the mainland before the water rises. The speed at which the tide comes in can easily trap the unwary. A large signpost (located at the start of the causeway) warns visitors of the danger. If this warning is ignored, there can be serious accidents or people may be stranded on the island until the next low tide. In 2011, a Daniel Defoe of Livingston, West Lothian and an unidentified female found themselves trapped on the island due to miscalculating the times of the tide. This story gained attention due to the ironic parallels with Robinson Crusoe; a novel written by Daniel Defoe published in 1719. Coastguards recommend that the crossing is only attempted during the two hours either side of low water. On the RNLI (Royal National Lifeboat Institution) Queensferry website, there is a list of “safe crossing times” and it states that the “times are given as a guide and may change due to weather and conditions. Times listed in BLACK are the first safe crossing time and those listed in RED are when to be back on the mainland”.

The island is in the estuary of the River Almond whose mouth is near the landward end of the crossing. It is a popular recreation area.

Cramond Island is one of 43 tidal islands that can be walked to from the mainland of Great Britain and one of 17 that can be walked to from the Scottish mainland.

== History ==
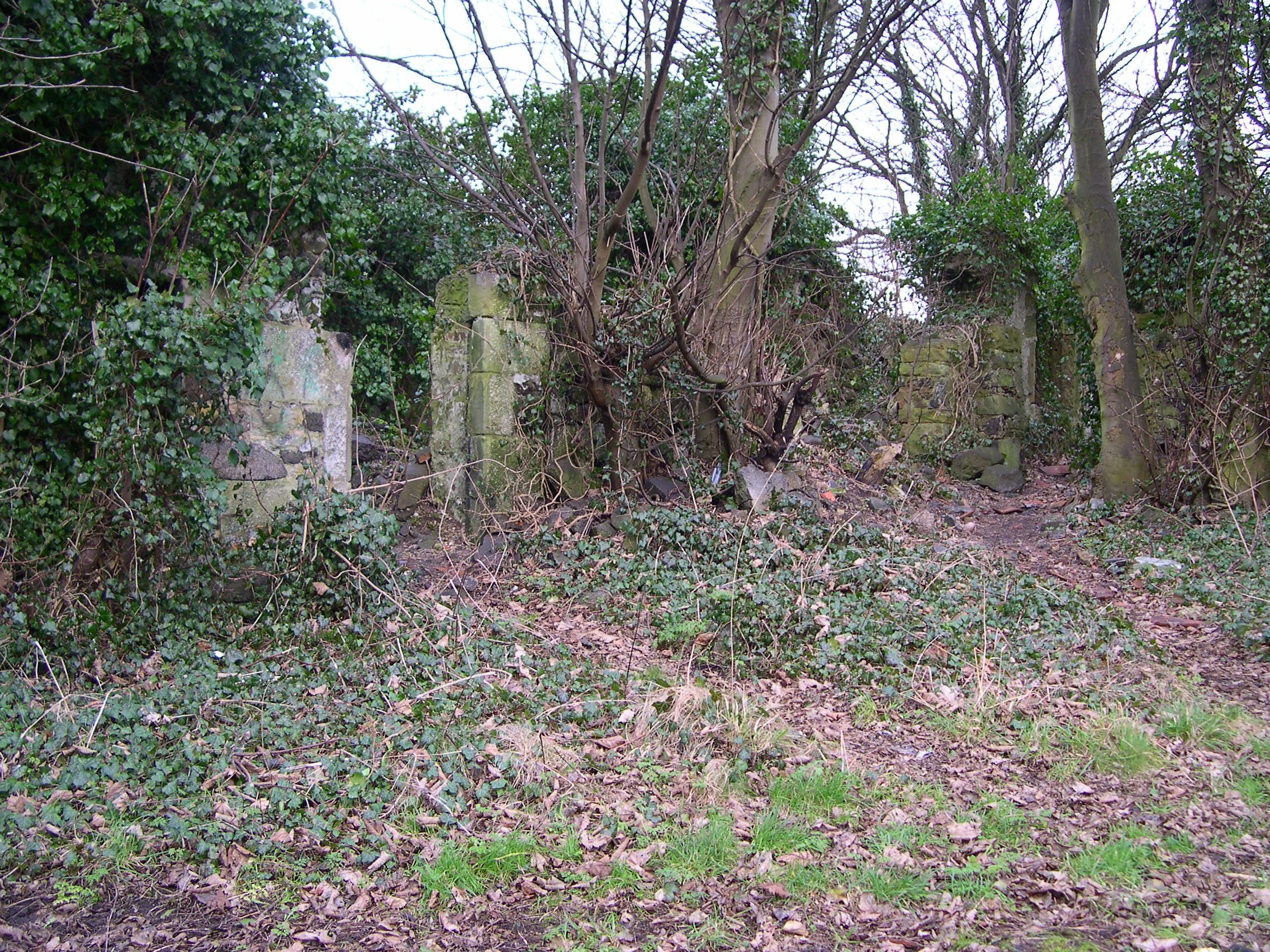
The ruined farmstead on Cramond Island

There is evidence to suggest that the island may have had special significance to the prehistoric peoples who lived along the coast of the Firth of Forth, as at least one stone burial cist was found. “The oldest evidence of human activity on the island is an early Christian long cist that was discovered by the army during WWII. Its position was not recorded.”

=== Urbs Iudeu ===
As nearby Cramond was a Roman outpost, it is likely that it may have been used by them. The Roman presence in Scotland was not particularly strong, but Cramond is one of the most archaeologically rich sites, along with Trimontium near Melrose.

The island has been identified as a likely candidate for the site of Urbs Iudeu, an early mediaeval stronghold mentioned by the Venerable Bede in his Ecclesiastical History of the English People. If so, King Osweo of Northumbria was besieged here in 655 AD by Penda of Mercia and his Welsh ally Cadafael of Gwynedd. Osweo bought off the besiegers, by “delivering all the treasures which were in the city into the hands of Penda, and Penda distributed them to the Kings of the British, this is called the Restitution of Iudeu”. As Iodeo, the island once gave its name to the Firth of Forth, in an early Welsh form merin Iodeo, recorded in Nennius' Historia Britonnum.

=== Modern era ===
In September 1596 James VI allowed Adam Bruntfield and James Carmichael to fight in single combat on the sands by Cramond Islands because Bruntfield accused Carmichael of killing his brother in treasonous circumstances. The Duke of Lennox went to the island to be the judge. Bruntfield killed Carmichael.

The British Wool Society grazed sheep on the island in the 1790s and the land was farmed for many years until the last farmer, Peter Hogg, died in 1904.

Throughout most of its history, Cramond Island was used for farming, especially sheep-farming, and perhaps served as a fishing outpost as well. The island was once famous for its oyster beds, but these were destroyed due to overfishing. In the north west corner of the island there are remains of a jetty built with local stone which could be medieval in origin, while towards the centre of the island, half-hidden by a small wood there is the ruin of a stone-built farmstead. It appears on an Ordnance Survey map of 1853, but may be considerably older. It was occupied until the 1930s and sheep were still kept on the island as late as the 1960s.

=== World War I ===
In 1914 a "Middle Line" of defences was established across the Firth of Forth, to protect an anchorage for warships between the line and the Forth Bridge. An anti-submarine net ran from Cramond Island to Inchmickery, to Inchcolm and to the Fife coast. The three islands were armed with 14 × 12-pdr guns, two of which were mounted on Cramond.

=== World War II ===
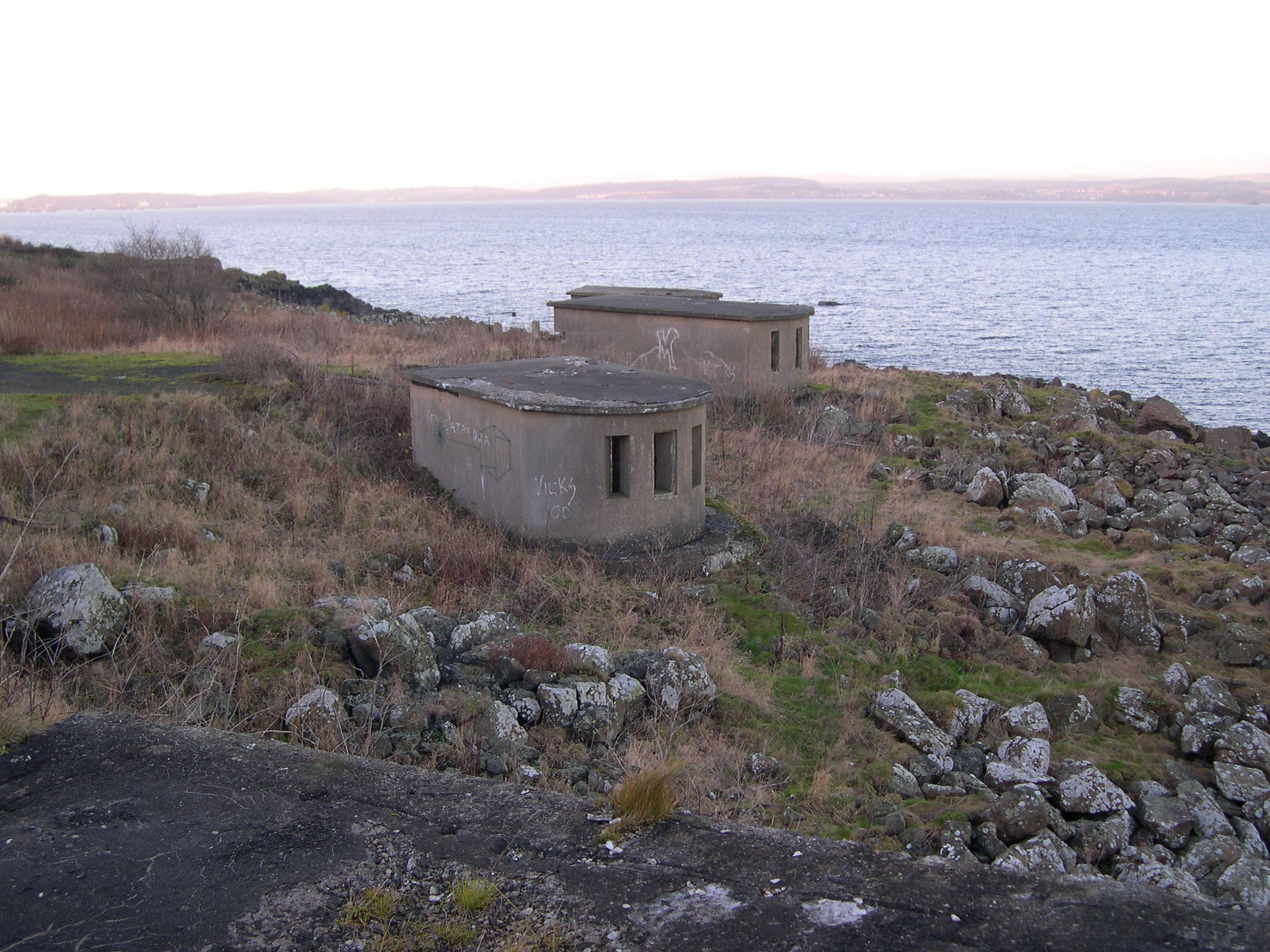
WW2-era fortifications on Cramond Island

At the outbreak of World War II, Cramond Island, along with other islands in the Forth, was refortified and armed with two 12-pdr guns, and a modern 6-pdr twin gun, designed specifically to tackle fast-moving torpedo boats. An anti-submarine net and anti-boat boom was laid across the estuary from Cramond Island directly to Inchcolm, and then to the Charles Hill battery on the Fife coast. The barrier was to protect ships in the anchorage from attack by torpedo boats, and to stop submarines entering the anchorage to attack shipping or to damage the dock gate of Rosyth Dockyard. The line of concrete pylons was built from Cramond Island to the shore to complete the anti-boat barrier (which is often misidentified as an anti-submarine barrier – the water is far too shallow). After crossing the causeway, the first structures are the emplacements for a 75 mm gun and its associated searchlight. Several WW2 buildings survive, including the housings for Coast Artillery Search Lights, stores, shelters and gun emplacements, as well as two engine rooms that once contained all the equipment necessary to supply power to the military installations on the island. The anchor points for the anti-submarine net and anti-boat boom are visible at the north end of the island at low tide.

Further along the northern coast, low concrete stumps protrude from the undergrowth, all that remain of the barracks that housed the garrison on the island.

On the western side is a small brick building of unknown purpose. Nearby, perched precariously on the rocky shore is the ruin of a small square building which was used as an ammunition store during the war, though its stone construction suggests it is much older than either World War, possibly contemporary with the farmstead in the middle of the island.

== See also ==
- List of islands of Scotland
