= Eyebroughy =

Island in East Lothian, Scotland, UK

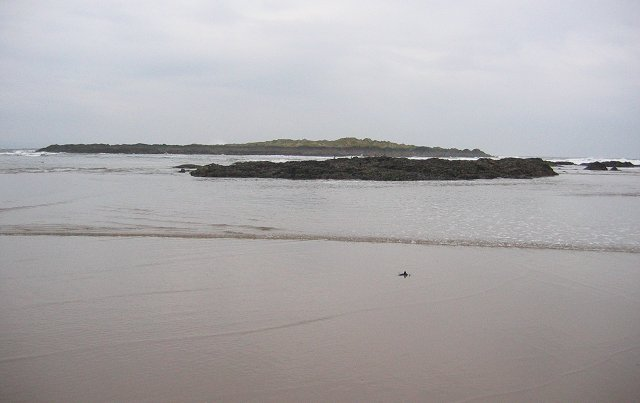
- Eyebroughy, with rocks in foreground

Location
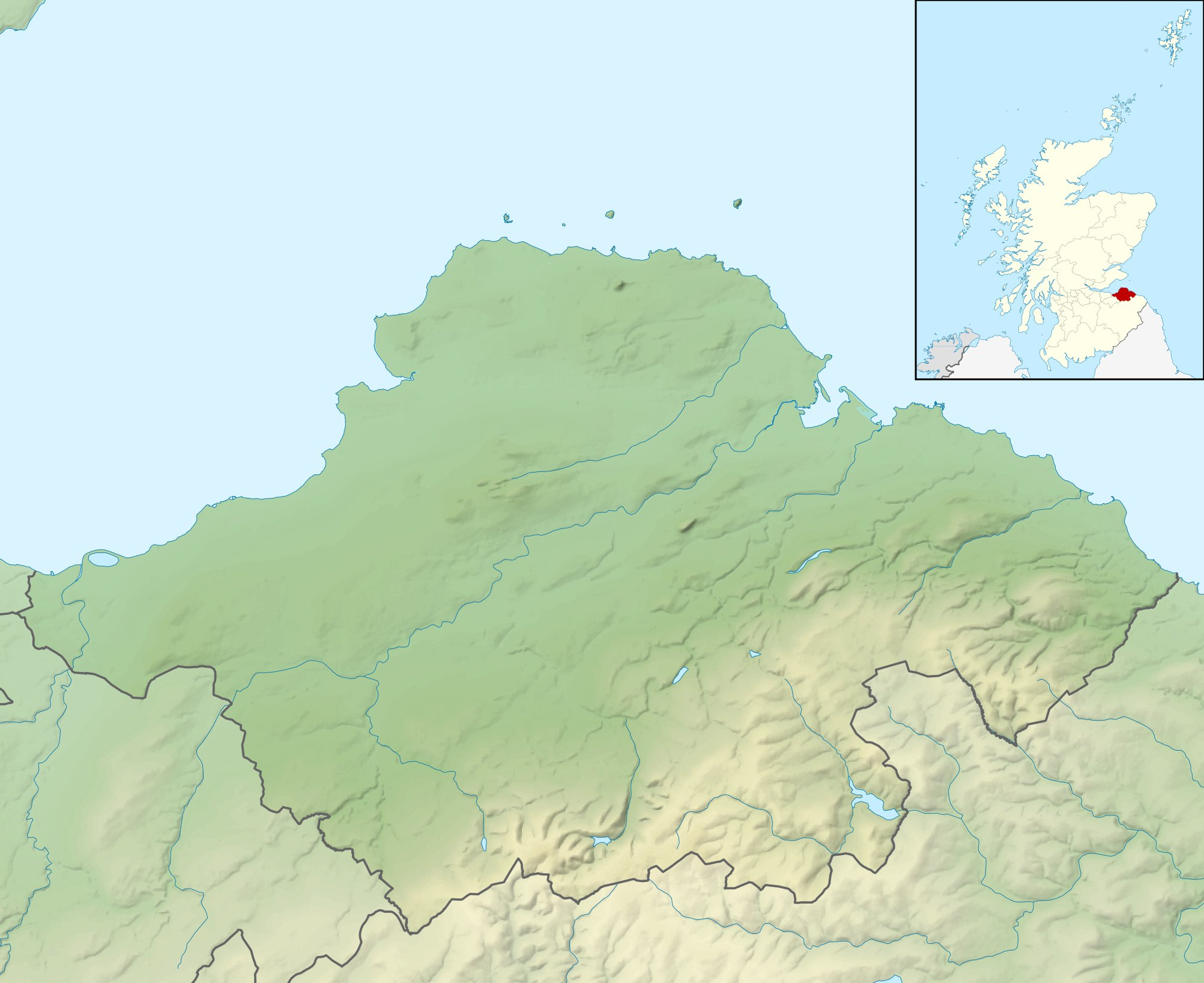
- The island shown within East Lothian
- Coordinates: 56.066667°N 2.816667°W

Physical geography
- Island group: Islands of the Forth

Administration
- Council area: East Lothian
- Country: Scotland
- Sovereign state: United Kingdom

Demographics
- Population: 0

Eyebroughy (or archaically Ibris; NT493859) is a small, rocky islet in the Firth of Forth, 200 m off East Lothian, Scotland.

== Location ==
Eyebroughy sits 200 metres (220 yd) off the East Lothian coast, 3.5 kilometres (2.2 miles) to the north northeast of the village of Gullane and 5 kilometres (3.1 miles) west of North Berwick. It is in the parish of Dirleton and sits opposite the western part of Dirleton's East Links, at low tide it may be possible to walk to the island. It formed part of the estate of Archerfield.

== Environment ==
It is an RSPB reserve, and the birds breeding on the island include common eider, great cormorant and herring gull, wintering birds include ruddy turnstone and purple sandpiper. The island is formed from an intrusion of trachytes from the lower Carboniferous. Eyebroughy is part of the Firth of Forth Islands Species Protection Area. It has been described as small and very narrow.

== Shipwrecks ==
Two shipwrecks are noted for Eybroughy. The first was the 94-ton wooden schooner Jane which was stranded on Eyebroughy, with a cargo of alum and a single passenger on its way from Goole to Leith, on 18 December 1892. The second is that of the 310-ton lighter Bertha, which loaded with salvage equipment. This vessel was lost on 21 December 1900 as it driven away from a stranded steamer and ran into Eyebroughy.

== Literary references ==
The Scottish historical novelist Nigel Tranter, who lived in nearby Luffness, mentioned Eyebroughy in at least two of his novels, Drug on the Market and Flowers of Chivalry.
