= Lamb (island) =

Uninhabited island off the east coast of Scotland

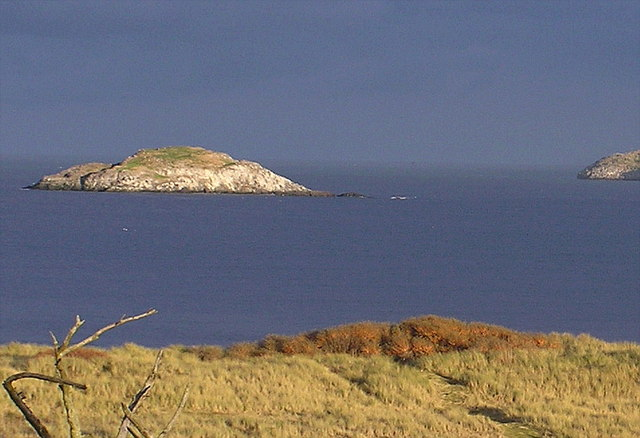
- View from Yellowcraigs

Location
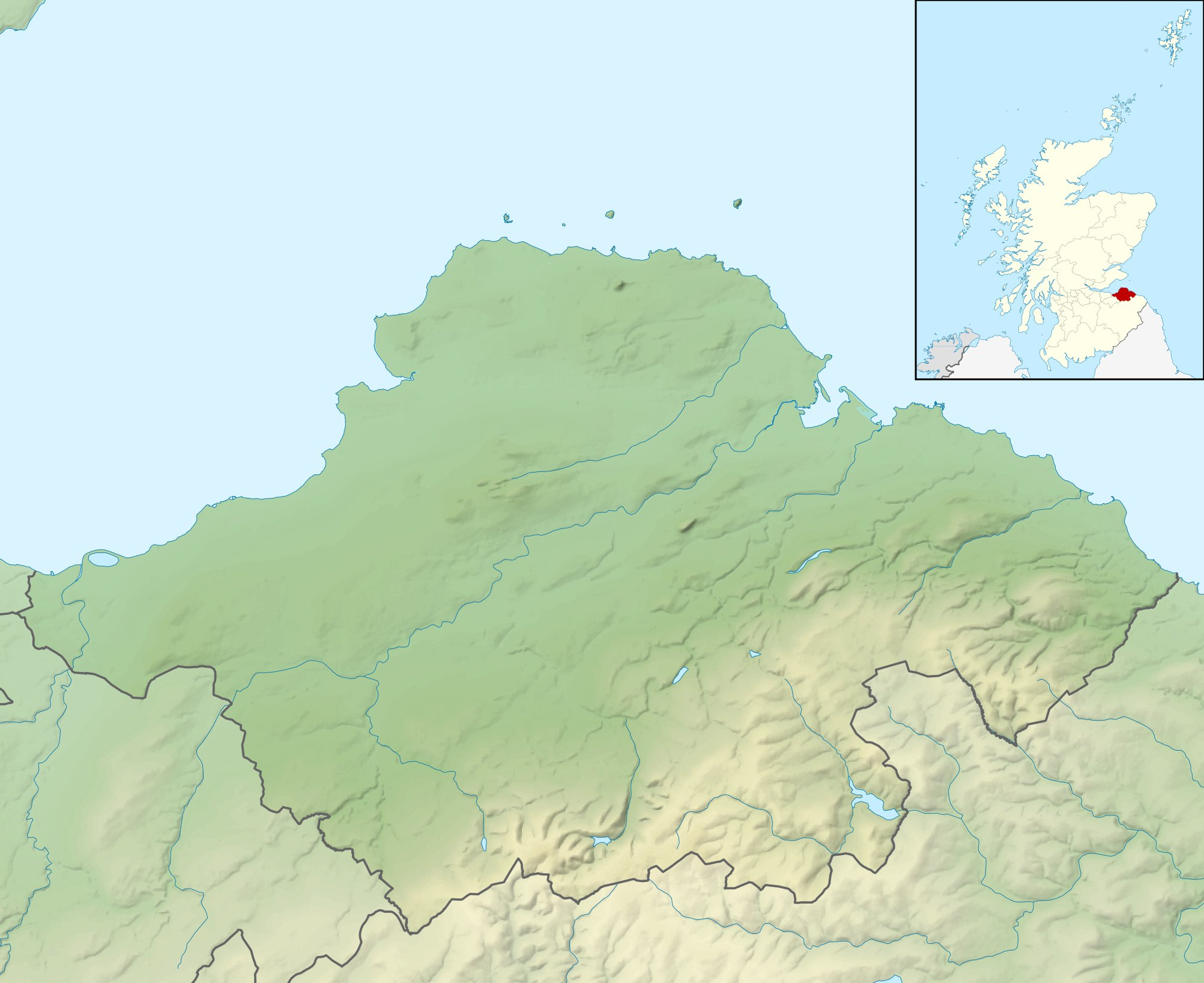
- The island shown within East Lothian
- OS grid reference: NT535865
- Coordinates: 56.069°N 2.748°W

Physical geography
- Island group: Islands of the Forth

Administration
- Council area: East Lothian
- Country: Scotland
- Sovereign state: United Kingdom

Demographics
- Population: 0

Lamb, sometimes called Lamb Island or The Lamb, is a small uninhabited island measuring approximately 100 by 50 metres (330 ft × 160 ft), between the islands of Fidra and Craigleith in the Firth of Forth, off the east coast of Scotland.

The Lamb is flanked by two "sheep dogs", North and South Dog Islands, which are basically small skerries. Like the other Islands of the Forth off North Berwick, the Lamb is a result of volcanic activity millions of years ago.

== Access ==
The Lamb can be reached by canoes and small boats from North Berwick, although there are no landing facilities and little to attract visitors when compared to Fidra island or the Bass Rock.

== Wildlife ==
Many seabirds live on the island. Several of the bird species return yearly to find food, breed, and raise their young. In addition, around 600 puffins have been found on the island after they first came in the 1970s.

Following a two-year operation involving 35 visits with canoes and infra-red cameras, a single invasive rat was removed from the island in 2022.

== Ownership ==
Lamb island was historically part of the Scottish feudal barony of Dirleton. The Lamb, along with North and South Dog Islands, was previously owned by Camilo Agasim-Pereira, Baron of Dirleton and Fulwood.

In 2009, the islands were sold for £30,000 to Uri Geller, who stated that he believes that it is a hiding place for ancient Egyptian treasure. In mid-2022, Geller sought to declare Lamb as "Republic of Lamb", a micronation with its own national anthem. Geller also became chairman of the North Berwick Amateurs FC, designated as Lamb's national football team.
