= Fidra =

Fiodra (Gaelic)
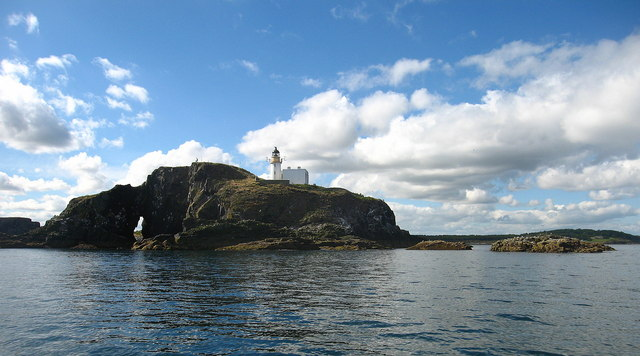

Location
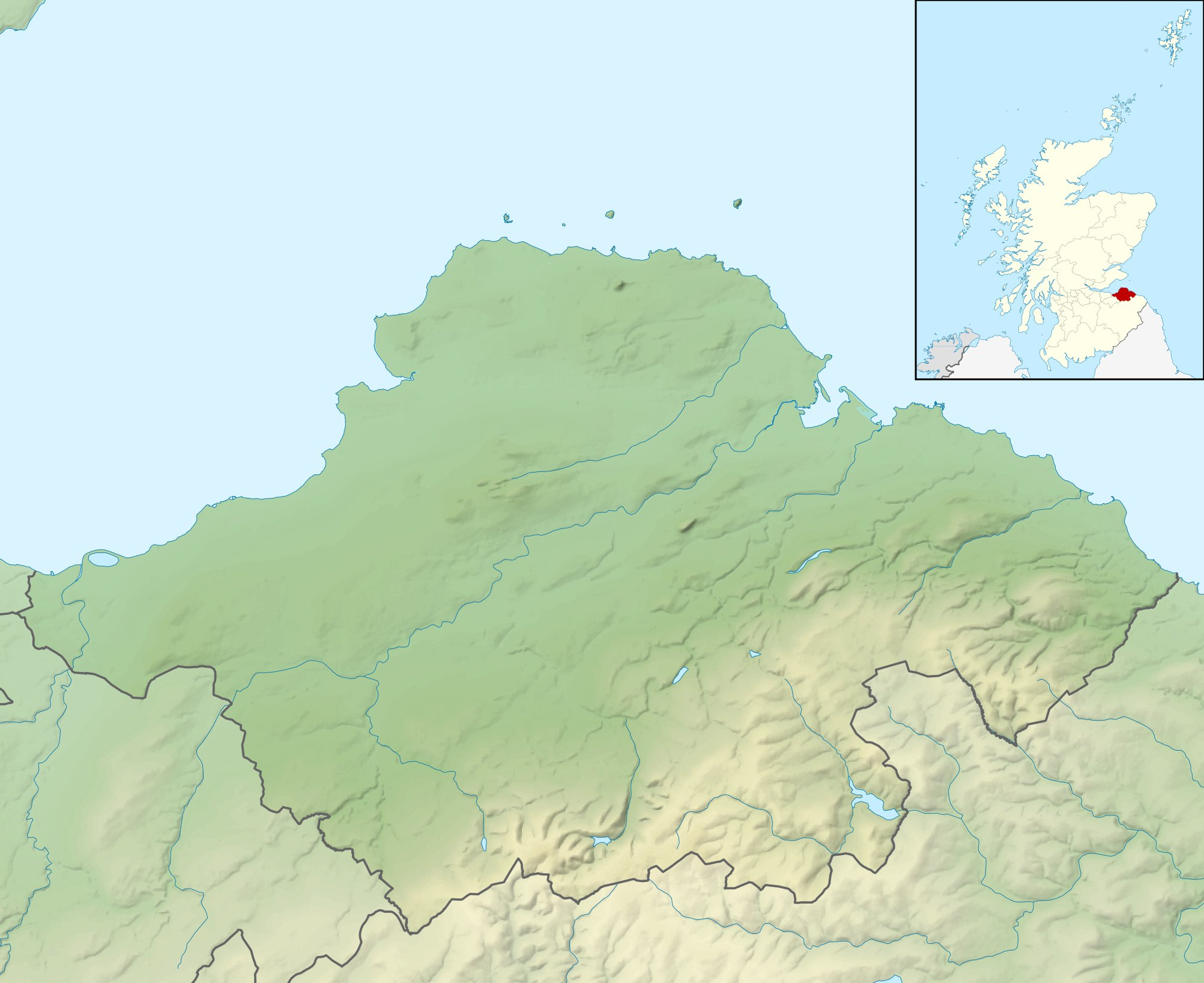
- Location within East Lothian
- OS grid reference: NT5186
- Coordinates: 56.07°N 2.78°W

Name
- Name meaning: Norse for "feather island"
- Old Norse name: Fiðrey

Physical geography
- Island group: Islands of the Forth
- Area: c. 10 ha (25 acres)
- Highest elevation: c. 20 m (66 ft)

Administration
- Council area: East Lothian
- Country: Scotland
- Sovereign state: United Kingdom

Demographics
- Population: 0

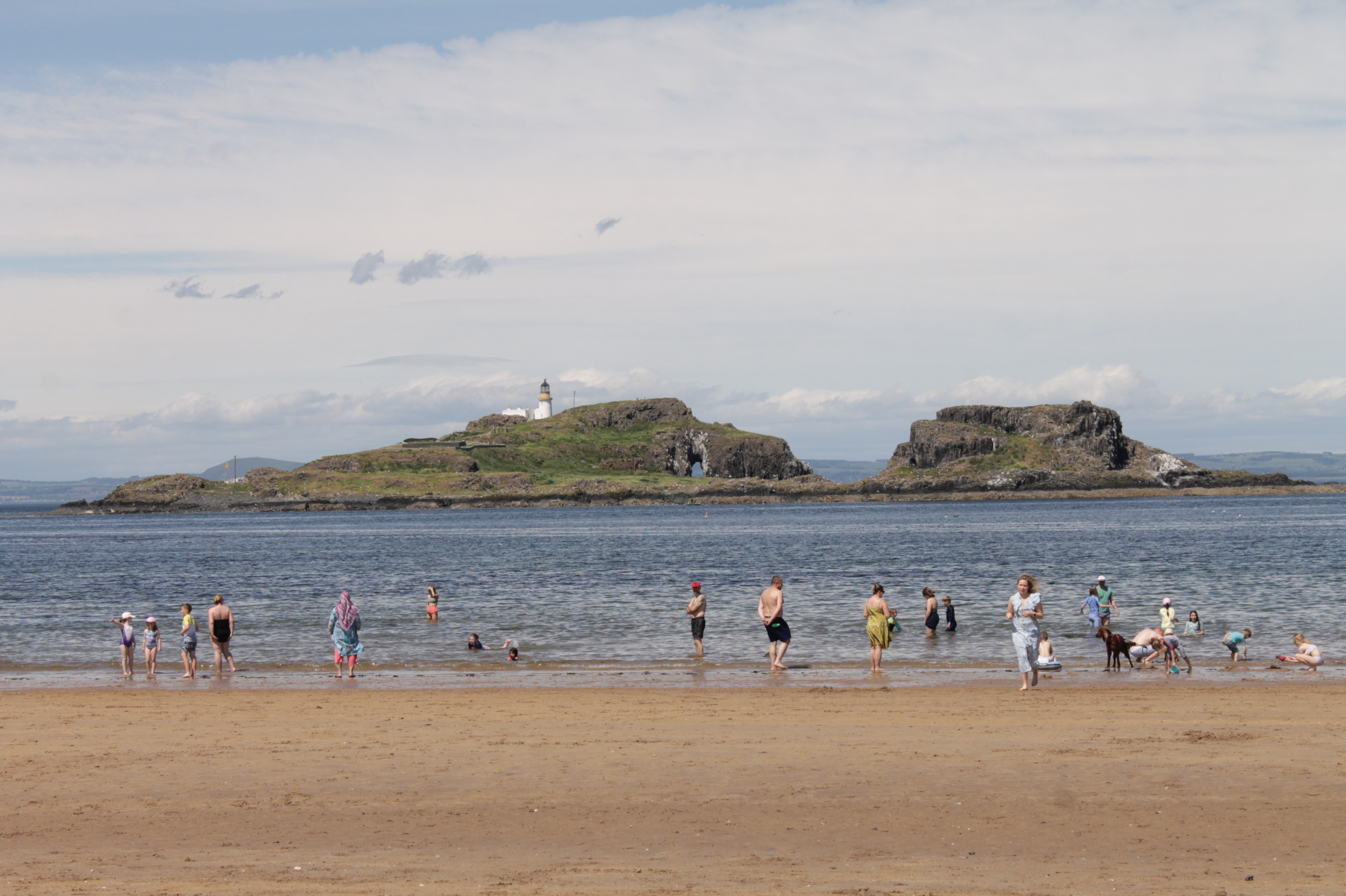
Fidra as seen from Yellowcraigs beach

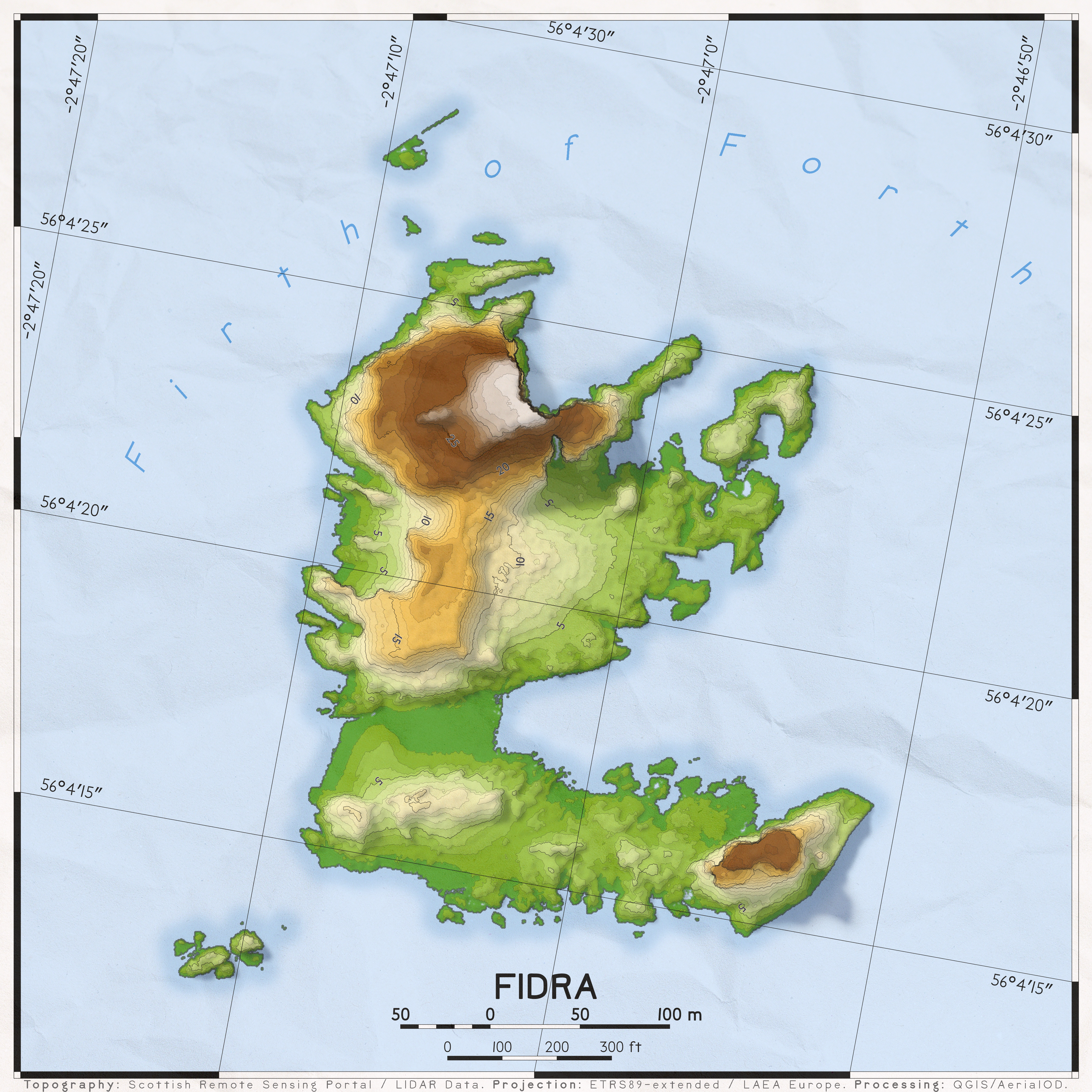
Map of Fidra

Fidra (archaically Fidrey or Fetheray) is a currently uninhabited island in the Firth of Forth, 4 kilometres (2 1/2 miles) northwest of North Berwick, on the east coast of Scotland. The island is an RSPB Scotland nature reserve.

== Geography ==
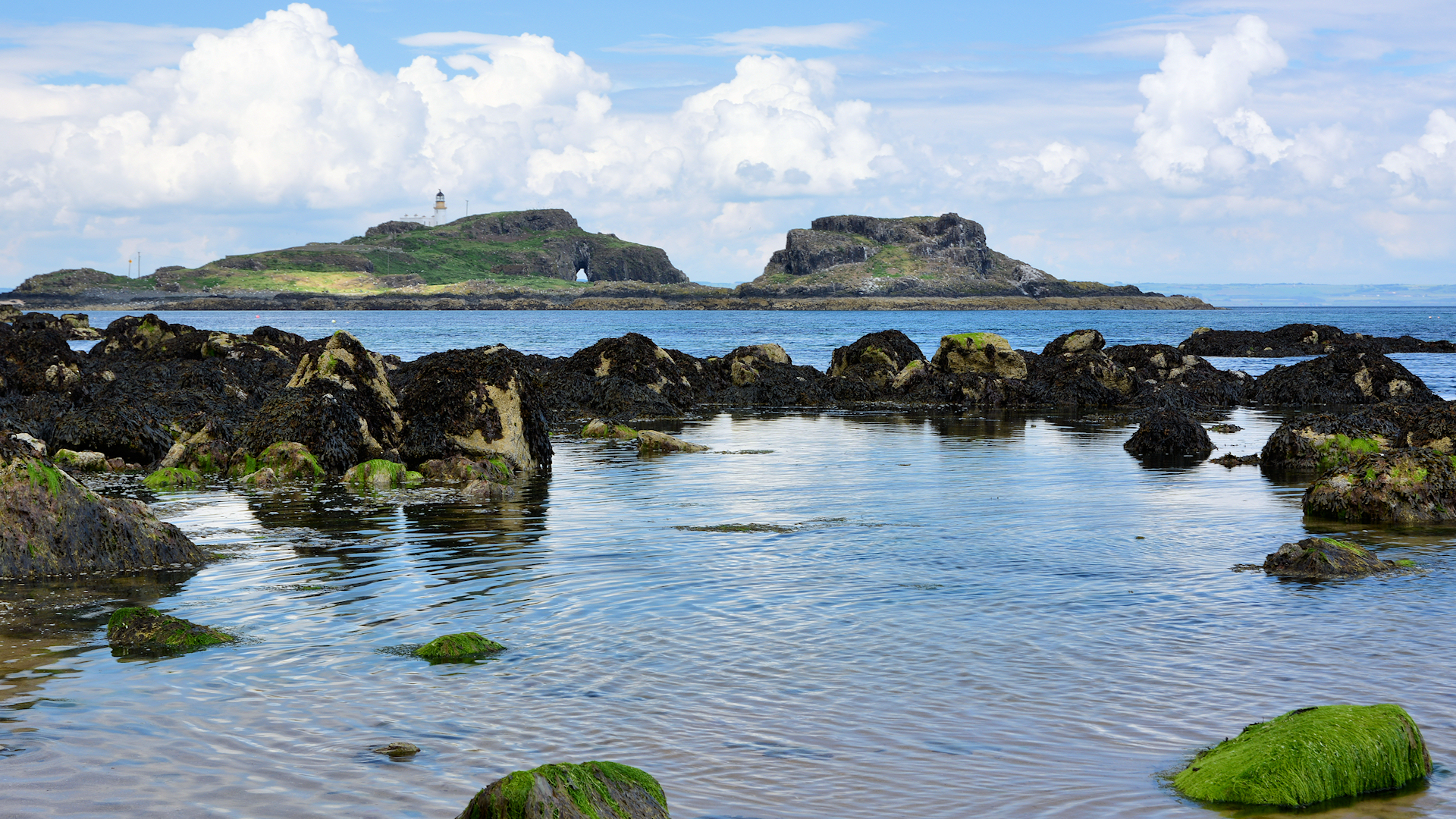
Fidra Island viewed from Yellowcraig beach

Like the other islands near North Berwick, Fidra is the result of volcanic activity around 335 million years ago. Fidra consists of three sections; a hill at one end with the lighthouse on it; a low-lying section in the middle, effectively an isthmus; and a rocky stack at the other end.

== History ==
The island's name is believed to be Old Norse in origin, referring to the large number of bird feathers found there. Like the nearby Bass Rock, it has a substantial seabird population, and is now an RSPB reserve. The village of Gullane lies to the south-west, and the nature reserve of Yellowcraig and village of Dirleton, to which parish Fidra belongs, are to the south. Remotely operated cameras on the island send live pictures to the watching visitors at the Scottish Seabird Centre in North Berwick.

Upon the island are ruins of an old chapel, or lazaretto for the sick, which was dedicated in 1165 to St Nicholas. In the 12th-century, the island formed part of the barony of Dirleton, which was granted to the Anglo-Norman John de Vaux by King David I. The de Vaux family built a stronghold, known as Castle Tarbet, on the island, but in 1220, William de Vaux gifted Fidra to the monks of Dryburgh Abbey, in the Borders. His successor built Dirleton Castle, on the mainland, as a replacement dwelling.

== Nature and ecology ==
The number of breeding puffins on the island has increased recently due to the removal of an introduced plant, tree mallow (Lavatera arborea). It is likely that it was planted by lighthouse keepers for use as toilet paper, and for its medicinal qualities. The shrub was blocking the entrances to the breeding burrows, and in 1996 the number of occupied burrows had fallen to approximately 400. Following clearance by RSPB Scotland staff and volunteers over 1,000 burrows are occupied in 2016.

== Cultural references ==
Robert Louis Stevenson often visited the beaches at the area known today as Yellowcraig and it is said that he based his map of Treasure Island on the shape of Fidra. (This claim is also made about the island of Unst in Shetland.) He also mentioned Fidra in his novel Catriona.

Fidra Books is a publishing house, named after the island, and which uses Fidra's outline as part of its logo.

The progressive rock band Marillion also briefly mention Fidra in the song, Warm Wet Circles, which contains the line "She nervously undressed in the dancing beams of the Fidra Lighthouse", the coast nearby apparently being a well-known courting spot.

== Lighthouse ==
Fidra Lighthouse
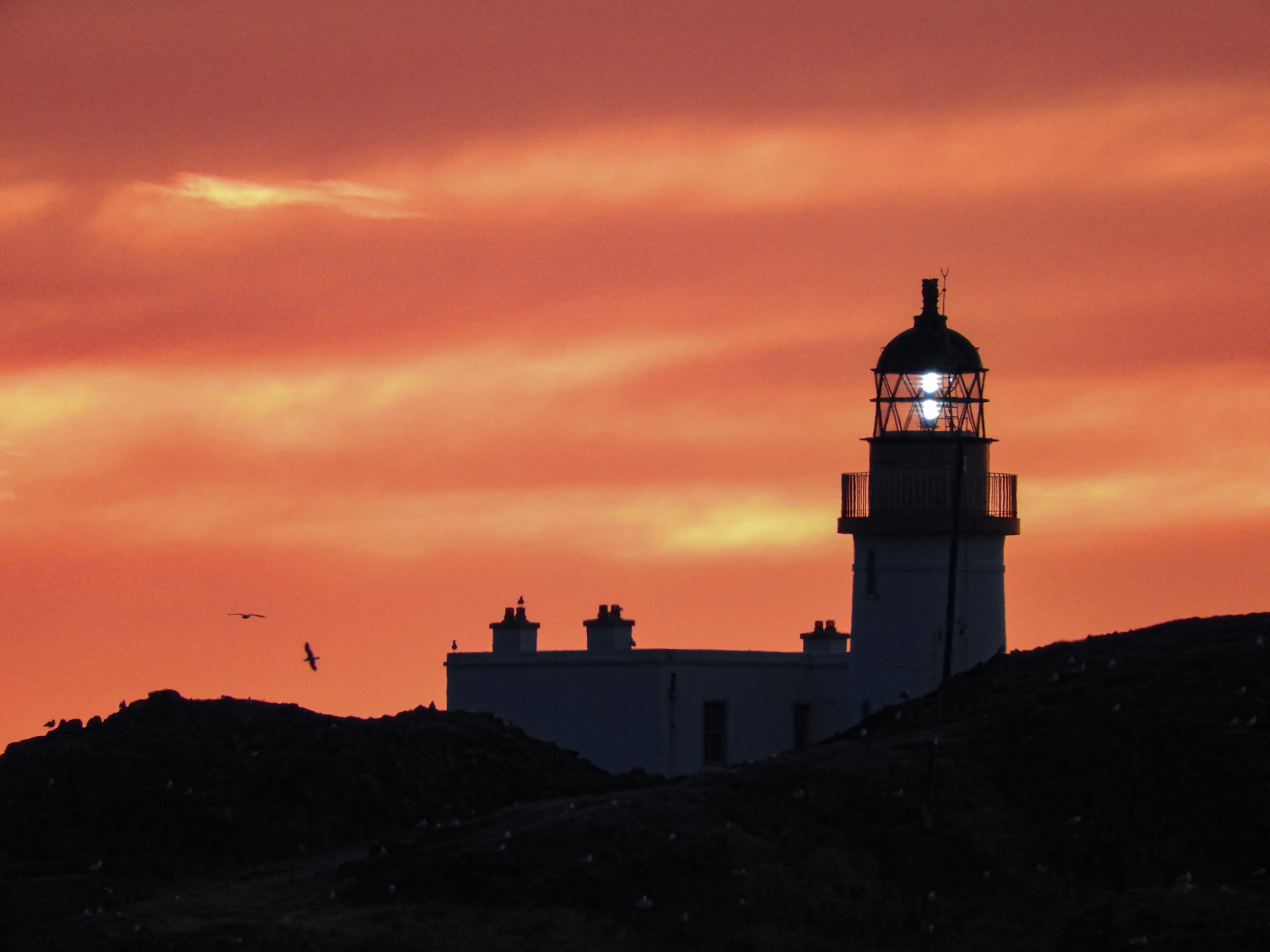
- Lighthouse on duty
- Location: Fidra, East Lothian, Dirleton, United Kingdom
- OS grid: NT5122386989
- Coordinates: 56°04′24″N 2°47′06″W

Tower
- Constructed: 1885
- Designed by: David Alan Stevenson, Thomas Stevenson
- Construction: brick (tower)
- Automated: 1970
- Height: 17 m (56 ft)
- Shape: cylindrical tower with balcony and lantern
- Markings: White (tower), black (lantern), ochre (trim)
- Power source: mains electricity
- Operator: Forth Ports
- Heritage: category C listed building

Light
- Focal height: 34 m (112 ft)
- Range: 15 nmi (28 km; 17 mi)
- Characteristic: Fl(4) W 30s 34m 15M
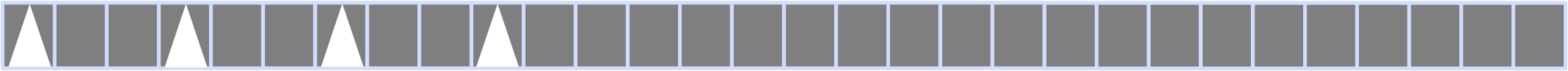
- Fidra dome

The lighthouse, which was designed by David Alan Stevenson (as his first work) in 1885 and supervised by his uncle Thomas Stevenson was manned until 1970 and is now automated, as are all Scottish lighthouses. However, Fidra was the first unmanned lighthouse. It is accessible via a private jetty on the east coast of the island. The light flashes 4 times every 30 seconds during hours of darkness.

== See also ==
- List of islands in Scotland
- List of lighthouses in Scotland
- List of Northern Lighthouse Board lighthouses
- Trinity House of Leith
