= Inchmickery =

Uninhabited island in the Firth of Forth, Scotland

Coordinates: 56.01084°N 3.27343°W

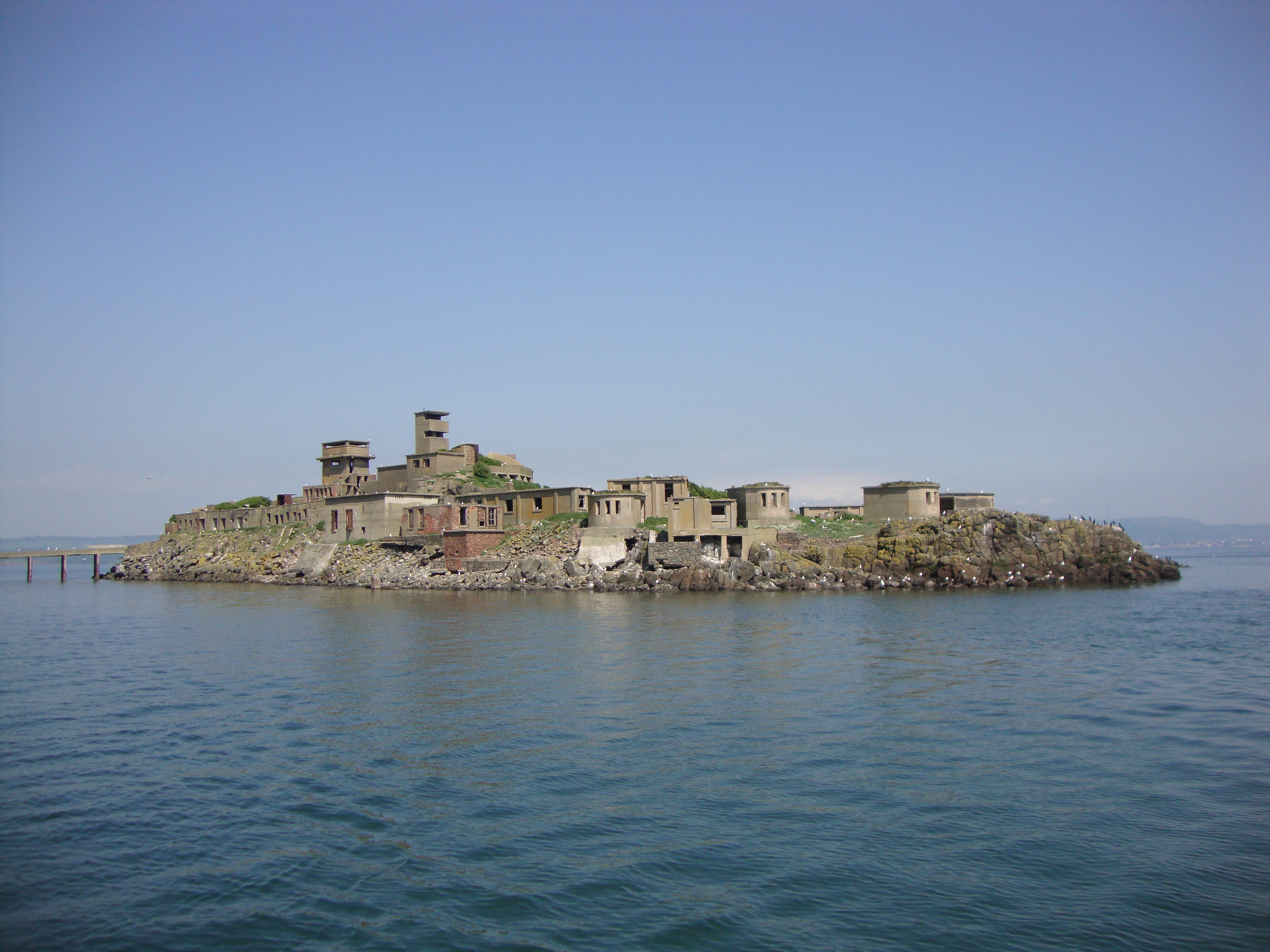
Inchmickery.

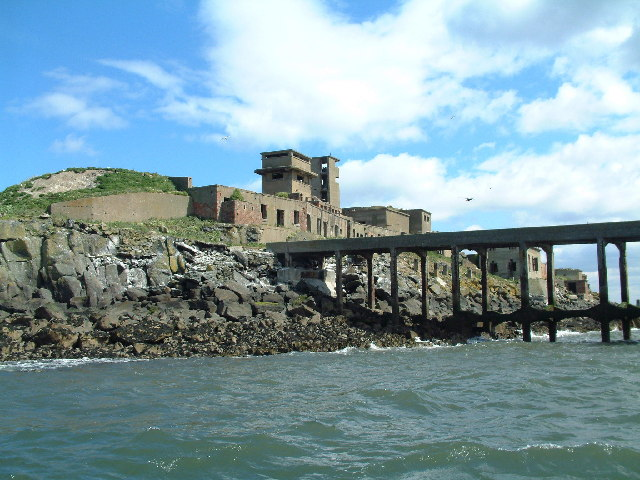
Wartime jetty, fortifications and military buildings on the island.

Inchmickery is a small island in the Firth of Forth in Scotland. It is about two miles (3.2 km) north of Edinburgh.

Its name comes from the Scottish Gaelic, Innis nam Biocaire, meaning Isle of the Vicars, implying that there may have been an old ecclesiastical or Culdee settlement here, as in nearby Inchcolm. It features occasionally in a riddle, "How many inches is the Forth?", playing on a pun on 'Inch' (Innis), the Gaelic word for island, and inch, the imperial measurement.

Inchmickery is tiny, only 100 metres by 200 metres. During both World War I and World War II the island was used as a gun emplacement. The concrete buildings make the island look (from a distance) like a battleship. Although the island is now uninhabited much of this concrete superstructure remains largely intact.

The conclusion of Iain Banks's 1993 novel Complicity was set here and the film adaptation used it as a location.

The island is now an RSPB reserve, and is home to breeding pairs of common eider, Sandwich terns and various gulls. It used to be a nesting site for the very rare roseate tern, but the roseate terns have now moved elsewhere in the Firth of Forth. There are exposed rocks off Inchmickery, known as the Cow & Calves.

Inchmickery was formerly known for its oyster-beds, and used to be covered in moss and lichen.

== See also ==
- List of islands of Scotland
