= Nisbet (surname) =

Nisbet is a surname. Alternate spellings include Nisbett, Nesbit, and Nesbitt. Notable people with the surname include:

- Alexander Nisbet (antiquarian) (1657–1725), Scottish heraldist
- Alexander Nisbet (judge) (1777–1857), Judge in the City of Baltimore
- Andrew Nisbet Jr. (1921–2013), American legislator and military officer
- Andrew Nisbet, founder and chairman of catering supplies retailer Nisbets Plc
- Andy Nisbet, (1953–2019), Scottish mountaineer
- Charles Nisbet (1736–1804), first president of Dickinson College in PA
- Eugenius A. Nisbet (1803–1871), American politician and jurist from the US state of Georgia
- Gavin Nisbet, Scottish footballer (Preston North End FC)
- Harold Nisbet (1873–1937), English amateur tennis player
- Harriet L. Nisbet (1853–1910), American civic leader
- Hume Nisbet (1849–1923), Scottish-Australian author and artist
- James Nisbet (disambiguation), several people
- John Nisbet, Lord Dirleton (1609–1687), Scottish judge
- John Nisbet (1627–1685), Scottish covenanter
- Kevin Nisbet, Scottish footballer
- Mary Nisbet (1778–1855), Countess of Elgin
- Murdoch Nisbet (1531–1559), Scottish bible translator
- Robin G. M. Nisbet (1925–2013), classical scholar
- Robert Nisbet (1913–1996), American sociologist
- Scott Nisbet, Scottish footballer (Rangers FC)
- William Nisbet (physician) (1759–1822), Scottish physician

== See also ==
- Nisbett (disambiguation)
- Nesbit (disambiguation)
- Nesbitt (disambiguation)
- Clan Nesbitt
