= Nisbet =

Nisbet could refer to:

== People ==
- Nisbet (surname)

== Places ==
Canada

- Nisbet Provincial Forest

United Kingdom

- Nisbet, Scottish Borders
- Nisbet House, Berwickshire

United States

- Nisbet, Indiana
- Nisbet, Pennsylvania

== See also ==
- Nisbett (disambiguation)
- Nesbit (disambiguation)
- Nesbitt (disambiguation)
- Clan Nesbitt
