= Nesbitt (surname) =

Nesbitt is a surname. Notable people with the surname include:

- Ángel Nesbitt (born 1990), Venezuelan baseball player in Major League Baseball
- Aric Nesbitt (born 1980), American politician
- Arthur James Nesbitt (1880–1954), Canadian businessman and philanthropist, cofounder of Nesbitt, Thomson and Company and the Power Corporation of Canada
- Arthur Deane Nesbitt (1910–1978), Canadian businessman and Second World War group captain and fighter pilot, son of the above
- Cathleen Nesbitt (1888–1982), English actress
- Cecil J. Nesbitt (1912–2001), Canadian-born American mathematician and actuary
- Charles H. Nesbitt (born 1947), American politician
- Charles R. Nesbitt (1921–2007), American attorney and politician, 9th Attorney General of Oklahoma
- Cheyenne Nesbitt (born 1999), American heptathlete
- Christine Nesbitt (born 1985), Canadian retired speed skater
- David Nesbitt (born 1991), Bahamian basketball player
- Derren Nesbitt (born 1935), English actor
- Esta Nesbitt (1918–1975), American fashion illustrator and xerox artist
- George Nesbitt (1859–1948), Irish-born Australian politician
- George Nesbitt (Irish politician) (1870/71–after 1925), Irish businessman and politician
- J. Aird Nesbitt (1908–1985), Canadian department store owner, son of Arthur James Nesbitt
- James Nesbitt (disambiguation)
- Jennifer Nesbitt (born 1995), British long-distance runner
- John Nesbitt (disambiguation)
- Joshua Nesbitt (born 1988), American football player
- Kenn Nesbitt (born 1962), American children's poet
- Lowell Blair Nesbitt (1933–1993), American painter, draughtsman, printmaker and sculptor
- Máiréad Nesbitt (born 1979), Irish fiddler and violin player
- Martin Nesbitt (born 1962), American businessman
- Martin Nesbitt (politician) (1946–2014), American politician
- Mary Cordell Nesbitt (1911–1979), American politician
- Nina Nesbitt (born 1994), Scottish singer and songwriter
- Randolph Nesbitt (1867–1956), South African-born Rhodesian police officer and Victoria Cross recipient
- Robert Nesbitt (disambiguation)
- Roxanne Nesbitt, Canadian interdisciplinary artist
- Stacey Nesbitt (born 1997), Canadian motorcycle road racer
- Sterling Nesbitt (born 1982), American paleontologist
- Travis Nesbitt, Canadian vocalist, member of the alternative rock group Social Code
- Wallace Nesbitt (1858–1930), Canadian lawyer jurist, member of the Supreme Court of Canada

== See also ==
- Clan Nesbitt, a Scottish clan
- Nesbit (disambiguation)
