= Alexander Nisbet =

Alexander Nisbet may refer to:

- Alexander Nisbet (antiquarian) (1657–1725), Scottish lawyer and antiquarian
- Sir Alexander Nisbet (Royal Navy officer) (1796–1874), Scottish naval surgeon
- Alexander Nisbet (judge) (1777–1857), American judge
