= Nisbett =

Nisbett may refer to:

== People ==
- Grant Nisbett (born 1950), New Zealand rugby football commentator
- Louisa Cranstoun Nisbett (1812–1858), actor
- Nisbet Balfour (1743–1823), British soldier and politician
- Margaret Nisbett (1929–2023), Australian soprano
- Patrice Nisbett (born 1971), Nevisian politician
- Richard E. Nisbett (born 1941), psychologist
- Steve Nisbett (1948–2018), drummer
- Thomas Nisbett (1925–2024), Bermudan Anglican priest
- Trevor Nisbett (born 1957), businessman

== Other ==
- Nisbett Building, commercial building in Big Rapids, Michigan

== See also ==
- Nisbet (disambiguation)
- Nesbit (disambiguation)
- Nesbitt (disambiguation)
