= John Nesbitt (disambiguation) =

John Nesbitt (1910–1960) was an American radio, film and TV narrator.

John Nesbitt may also refer to:

- John Nesbett (fl 15th century), English singer and composer represented in the Eton Choirbook.
- John Nesbitt (MP) (1745–1817), English Member of Parliament for Winchelsea and Bodmin
- John Nesbitt (1900–1935), American jazz trumpeter, composer and arranger with Don Redman
- John W. Nesbitt (1939–2023), American Byzantine historian, wrote about Alexander of Cyprus
- John D. Nesbitt (born 1948), American Western writer and educator

== See also ==
- Nesbitt (surname)
