= Nesbitt =

Nesbitt may refer to:

== Places ==
- Nesbitt, Manitoba, Canada, an unincorporated community
- Nesbitt, County Durham, England - see List of civil parishes in County Durham
- Nesbit, Northumberland, a hamlet and former civil parish near Wooler, in Northumberland, England
- Nesbitt, Northumberland, a former civil parish, now in Stamfordham parish, England
- Nesbitt, Texas, United States, an unincorporated community

== Other uses ==
- Nesbitt (surname)
- Clan Nesbitt, a Scottish clan
- Nesbitt's, an American soft drink brand
- A muscadine (Vitis rotundifolia) cultivar

== See also ==
- Nesbitt, Thomson and Company, a Canadian stockbrokerage
- Nesbitt's inequality, a mathematical inequality
- Schuette–Nesbitt formula, a mathematical formula in probability theory
- Nesbit (disambiguation)
- Nisbet (disambiguation)
