= List of listed buildings in Edrom, Scottish Borders =

This is a list of listed buildings in the parish of Edrom in the Scottish Borders, Scotland.

== List ==
Name	Location	Date Listed	Grid Ref. (Note: Sometimes known as OSGB36, the grid reference (where provided) is based on the British national grid reference system used by the Ordnance Survey. • "Guide to National Grid". Ordnance Survey. • "Get-a-map". Ordnance Survey.)	Geo-coordinates	Notes	LB Number (Note: Historic Environment Scotland assign a unique alphanumeric identifier to each designated site in Scotland, for listed buildings this always begins with "LB", for example "LB12345".)	Image
Allanton, Blackadder Cottage And Screen Wall				55°46′58″N 2°12′59″W	Category C(S)	44456	Upload Photo
1-3 (Inclusive) Blackadder Mount Farm Cottages				55°46′24″N 2°13′45″W	Category C(S)	44474	Upload Photo
Edrom, 1 And 2 Manse Cottages				55°47′35″N 2°16′25″W	Category C(S)	44485	Upload Photo
Edrom Mains, Farmhouse				55°47′44″N 2°17′53″W	Category C(S)	44488	Upload Photo
1-5 (Inclusive Nos) Edrom Newton Farm Cottages				55°47′24″N 2°16′23″W	Category B	44489	Upload Photo
Kelloe Dovecot, Cottages With Garden Wall And Railings				55°46′22″N 2°16′35″W	Category C(S)	44494	Upload Photo
Kelloe House, Butler's Wing, Stable And Coach House, Boundary Wall, Hydroelectric Plant, Drum Piers				55°46′20″N 2°15′13″W	Category C(S)	44495	Upload Photo
Kelloe Mains, Farmhouse With Outbuildings, Glass House, Gatepiers, Walled Garden, Terrace Walls, Steps, Plaque And Sundial				55°46′42″N 2°15′44″W	Category B	44497	Upload Photo
1-5 (Inclusive Nos) Sinclair's Hill With Water Pump				55°44′59″N 2°17′45″W	Category B	44513	Upload Photo
Mouth Bridge				55°46′11″N 2°16′49″W	Category B	4271	Upload Photo
Kimmerghame Bridge				55°45′25″N 2°18′18″W	Category B	4273	Upload Photo
Nisbet House, Including Walled Garden And Gardener's Cottage, Vault				55°45′14″N 2°19′41″W	Category A	2131	Upload another image See more images
Kimmerghame House With Terrace And Boundary Walls, Boar Statues, Garden Seat, Sundial, Gates And Gatepiers				55°45′18″N 2°18′36″W	Category B	2133	Upload Photo
Sinclair's Hill, Former School				55°44′59″N 2°17′45″W	Category B	2134	Upload Photo
Allanbank Courtyard, Former Steading				55°47′03″N 2°14′01″W	Category B	44450	Upload Photo
Allanton, Allanton Inn				55°46′55″N 2°12′56″W	Category C(S)	44453	Upload Photo
Allanton, Ardshiel				55°46′50″N 2°12′56″W	Category C(S)	44455	Upload Photo
Allanton, Former Uf Church, Manse, Hearse House/Stables, Linking Outbuilding And Boundary Wall				55°46′21″N 2°12′42″W	Category C(S)	44459	Upload Photo
Allanton, Holmeknowe				55°46′57″N 2°12′56″W	Category C(S)	44462	Upload Photo
Allanton, South Lodge, Lydd Cottage, East Entrance To Former Blackadder Estate With Quadrants, Gatepiers, Gate And Railings				55°46′53″N 2°12′58″W	Category B	44465	Upload Photo
Allanton, Fernbank (Old School House), And Baldrick Cottage				55°46′56″N 2°12′58″W	Category C(S)	44467	Upload Photo
1-4 (Inclusive Nos) Blackadder Bank Cottages				55°45′55″N 2°12′58″W	Category C(S)	44469	Upload Photo
Blackadder Walled Garden With Summer House Outbuildings Gateway And Gates				55°46′39″N 2°14′25″W	Category B	44478	Upload Photo
Edrom War Memorial				55°47′25″N 2°16′09″W	Category B	44490	Upload Photo
Kimmerghame Mains, Farmhouse				55°44′48″N 2°18′11″W	Category B	44506	Upload Photo
Nisbet Hill, Bridge				55°44′47″N 2°19′14″W	Category B	44509	Upload another image
Kelloe Bridge				55°46′23″N 2°15′46″W	Category B	2130	Upload Photo
Nisbet Dovecot				55°44′55″N 2°19′33″W	Category A	2132	Upload another image See more images
Blackadder Bridge				55°47′01″N 2°13′07″W	Category B	2135	Upload Photo
Allanton, Allanton Post Office And Rose Cottage				55°46′57″N 2°12′59″W	Category C(S)	44454	Upload Photo
Allanton, Former A Brunton And Son With Outbuilding				55°46′58″N 2°12′57″W	Category C(S)	44457	Upload Photo
Allanton, Former Carter's House				55°46′56″N 2°12′56″W	Category C(S)	44458	Upload Photo
Allanton, Garrymore				55°46′56″N 2°12′56″W	Category C(S)	44460	Upload Photo
4 And 5 Blackadder Mount Farm Cottages With Smithy And Joiner's Workshop				55°46′24″N 2°13′41″W	Category C(S)	44475	Upload Photo
Crunklaw, Steading				55°44′44″N 2°21′03″W	Category C(S)	44484	Upload Photo
Kimmerghame Estate, Gardener's Cottage				55°45′19″N 2°17′31″W	Category B	44498	Upload Photo
Kimmerghame Estate, 1 And 2 Kimmerghame Heugh				55°45′34″N 2°17′13″W	Category C(S)	44499	Upload Photo
Kimmerghame House, Walled Garden With Greenhouses And Urns				55°45′17″N 2°17′37″W	Category B	44504	Upload Photo
Stuartslaw, Steading				55°47′26″N 2°13′45″W	Category B	44517	Upload Photo
West Blackadder-Cottages				55°45′49″N 2°15′07″W	Category C(S)	44518	Upload Photo
Kimmerghame House, North Lodge				55°45′22″N 2°18′12″W	Category B	4272	Upload Photo
Edrom Newton Farm Buildings				55°47′23″N 2°16′33″W	Category B	4277	Upload Photo
Allanton Bridge				55°47′04″N 2°13′01″W	Category B	2136	Upload Photo
Blackadder Mains, Cottage				55°45′45″N 2°14′18″W	Category C(S)	44473	Upload Photo
Broomdykes, Steading With Stalk				55°46′34″N 2°11′41″W	Category B	44480	Upload Photo
Gardener's Cottage				55°46′42″N 2°14′22″W	Category C(S)	44491	Upload Photo
Kimmerghame House, Stables				55°45′21″N 2°17′47″W	Category B	44503	Upload Photo
Nisbet House, Stable And Coach House				55°45′15″N 2°19′40″W	Category A	44511	Upload Photo
6 Sinclair's Hill, Old School House				55°44′59″N 2°17′43″W	Category B	44514	Upload Photo
Whitelaw, Farmhouse, Stable And Outbuildings				55°45′59″N 2°17′03″W	Category C(S)	4276	Upload Photo
Chirnside Bridge Paper Mill And Stalk				55°47′59″N 2°14′20″W	Category B	4126	Upload Photo
Allanton, North Lodge, Woodside Cottage, East Entrance To Former Blackadder Estate With Quadrants, Gatepiers, Gate And Railings				55°46′54″N 2°12′58″W	Category C(S)	150	Upload Photo
Blackadder Cottage				55°46′48″N 2°14′16″W	Category B	44471	Upload Photo
Bridge To Sw Of Mungo Walls, Spanning Langton Burn				55°45′42″N 2°18′38″W	Category C(S)	44479	Upload Photo
Hermitage				55°44′35″N 2°18′46″W	Category C(S)	44493	Upload Photo
Kimmerghame House, Water Tower				55°45′18″N 2°17′53″W	Category B	44505	Upload Photo
Mid Edrom, Steading				55°47′46″N 2°16′31″W	Category B	44507	Upload Photo
Nisbet Rhodes				55°45′33″N 2°20′20″W	Category C(S)	44512	Upload Photo
7 And 8 Sinclair's Hill, With Former Smithy				55°44′58″N 2°17′44″W	Category B	44515	Upload Photo
Stuartslaw, Farmhouse				55°47′25″N 2°13′41″W	Category C(S)	44516	Upload Photo
Chirnside Bridge, Former Manager's House With Summer House, Boundary Walls And Steps				55°47′56″N 2°14′22″W	Category B	4127	Upload Photo
Edrom, Parish Church With Graveyeard And Monuments				55°47′44″N 2°16′36″W	Category A	2127	Upload Photo
Allanton, Allanbrae				55°46′59″N 2°13′01″W	Category C(S)	44452	Upload Photo
Allanton, Smiddy Cottage				55°46′50″N 2°12′55″W	Category C(S)	44464	Upload Photo
Bellshiel Farmhouse				55°44′13″N 2°17′18″W	Category B	44468	Upload Photo
Chirnside Bridge				55°47′57″N 2°14′16″W	Category B	44482	Upload Photo
Edrom, Village Hall And Former School				55°47′38″N 2°16′25″W	Category C(S)	44486	Upload Photo
Kelloe Lodge, Gatepiers, Gate, Quadrants And Boundary Walls				55°46′29″N 2°15′46″W	Category C(S)	44496	Upload Photo
Kimmerghame Mill				55°45′24″N 2°18′19″W	Category B	4274	Upload Photo
Blackadder Mount, South Lodge Gatepiers And Gates				55°45′48″N 2°13′44″W	Category B	4279	Upload Photo
Allanton, Boat House				55°47′06″N 2°13′08″W	Category C(S)	44451	Upload Photo
Allanton, Sheaf House				55°46′56″N 2°12′58″W	Category C(S)	44463	Upload Photo
Allanton, Southern Water Fountain				55°46′52″N 2°12′56″W	Category B	44466	Upload Photo
Blackadder Bank, Farmhouse				55°45′54″N 2°13′10″W	Category B	44470	Upload Photo
Blackadder Mains Steading				55°45′51″N 2°14′27″W	Category B	44472	Upload Photo
Blackadder North Lodge				55°47′13″N 2°14′37″W	Category B	44476	Upload Photo
Edrom House Lodge				55°47′45″N 2°16′31″W	Category C(S)	44487	Upload Photo
Kimmerghame House, Ice House				55°45′25″N 2°17′53″W	Category C(S)	44501	Upload Photo
Chirnside Bridge Paper Mill, Former Railway Bridge				55°48′02″N 2°14′26″W	Category B	179	Upload Photo
Allanton, Greystones				55°46′56″N 2°12′56″W	Category C(S)	44461	Upload Photo
Blackadder Suspension Bridge				55°46′53″N 2°13′54″W	Category C(S)	44477	Upload Photo
Canal Bridge, Near Nisbet House				55°45′04″N 2°19′47″W	Category C(S)	44481	Upload Photo
Crunklaw, House And Outbuilding				55°44′43″N 2°21′02″W	Category B	44483	Upload Photo
Gold Nick				55°46′49″N 2°13′22″W	Category B	44492	Upload Photo
Kimmerghame Estate, South Lodge And Gatepiers				55°45′05″N 2°17′49″W	Category B	44500	Upload Photo
Kimmerghame House, Pedestrian Bridge				55°45′26″N 2°17′49″W	Category B	44502	Upload Photo
Monument To Antoine De La Bastie				55°48′07″N 2°18′48″W	Category B	44508	Upload Photo
Nisbet Hill, Mill House				55°44′47″N 2°19′23″W	Category C(S)	44510	Upload Photo
Blackadder Mount Steading				55°46′24″N 2°14′00″W	Category B	4278	Upload Photo
Allanton, Old Fire Station				55°46′55″N 2°12′56″W	Category B	4280	Upload Photo
Edrom House With Gates And Gatepiers, Canal Bridge And Outbuildings				55°47′47″N 2°16′46″W	Category B	2129	Upload Photo
Edrom Newton, Farmhouse With Boundary Walls, Gatepiers And Outbuilding				55°47′20″N 2°16′30″W	Category B	151	Upload Photo

== Key ==
The scheme for classifying buildings in Scotland is:

- Category A: "buildings of national or international importance, either architectural or historic; or fine, little-altered examples of some particular period, style or building type."
- Category B: "buildings of regional or more than local importance; or major examples of some particular period, style or building type, which may have been altered."
- Category C: "buildings of local importance; lesser examples of any period, style, or building type, as originally constructed or moderately altered; and simple traditional buildings which group well with other listed buildings."

In March 2016 there were 47,288 listed buildings in Scotland. Of these, 8% were Category A, and 50% were Category B, with the remaining 42% being Category C.
