= Fitzroy Square =

Georgian square in London, England

Coordinates: 51°31′22.61″N 00°08′24.37″W

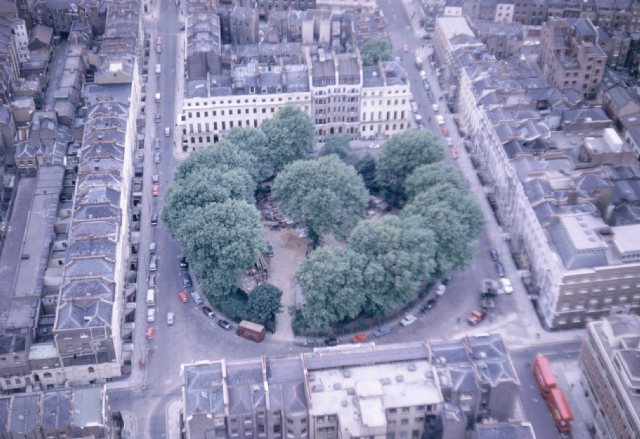
Fitzroy Square, view to the north from the Post Office Tower in 1967

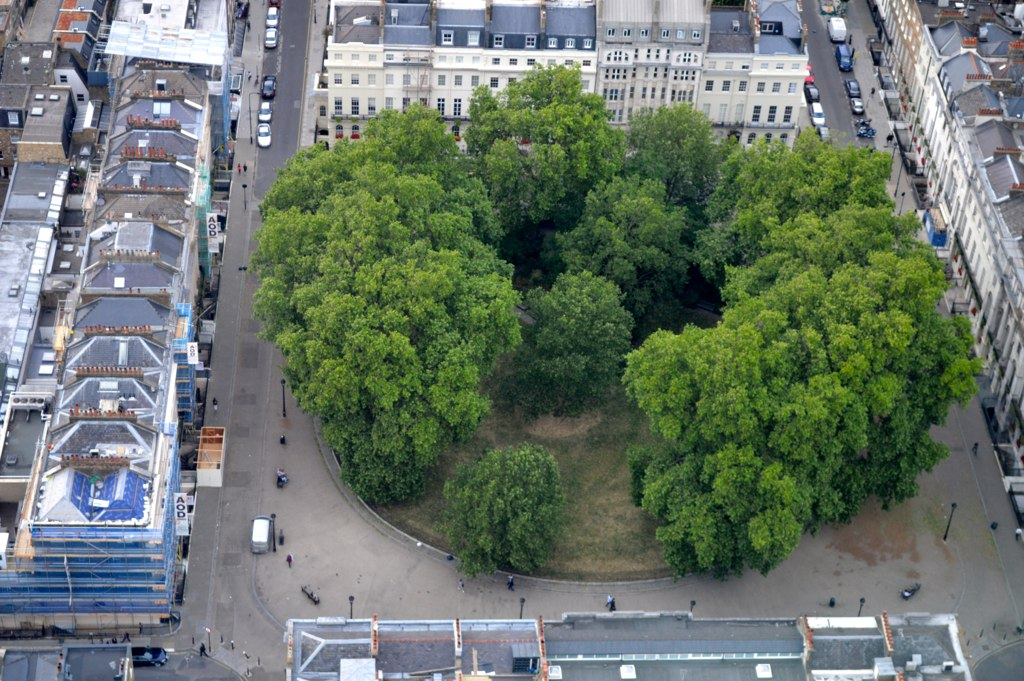
The square in 2015

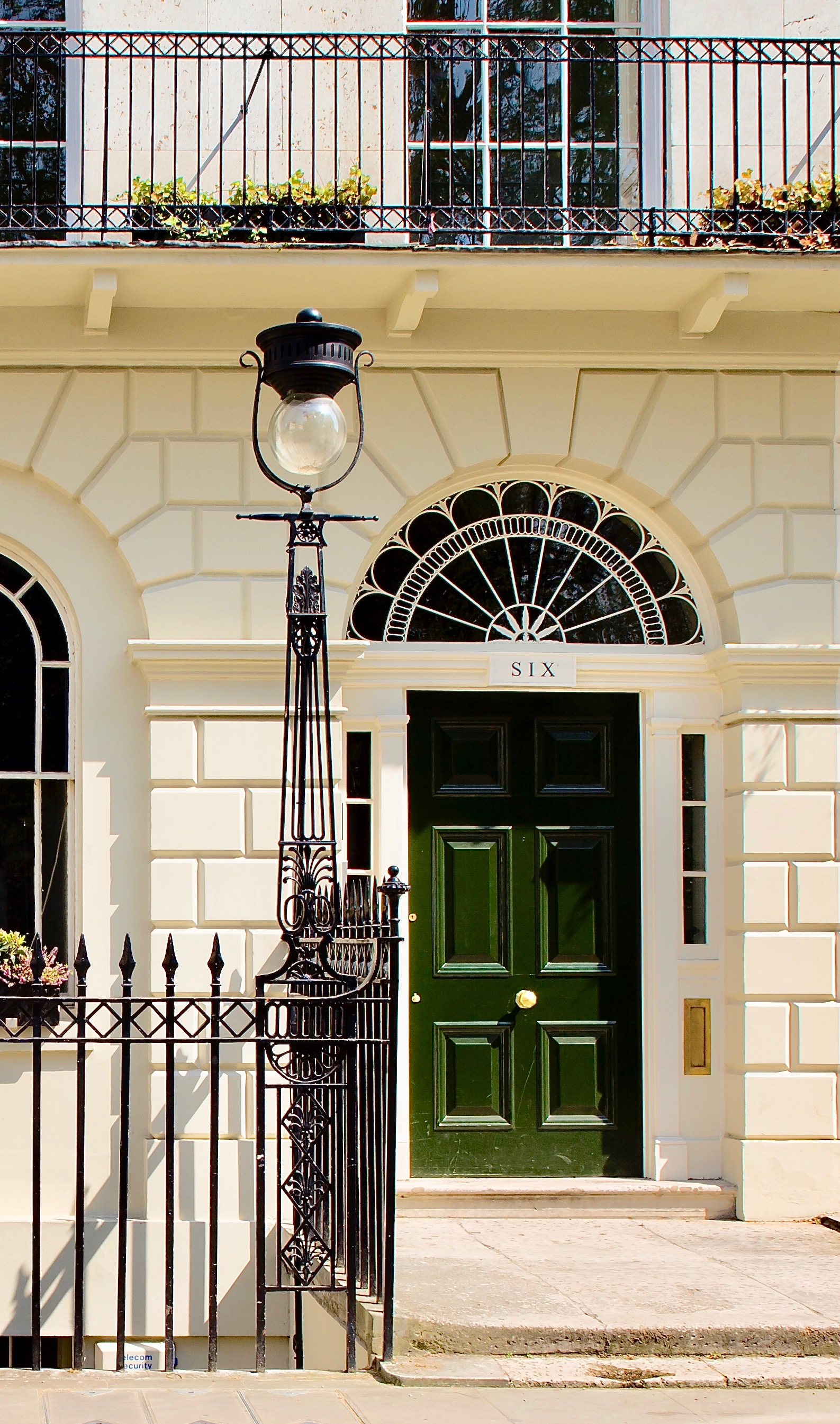
Entrance to 6 Fitzroy Square, headquarters of The Georgian Group

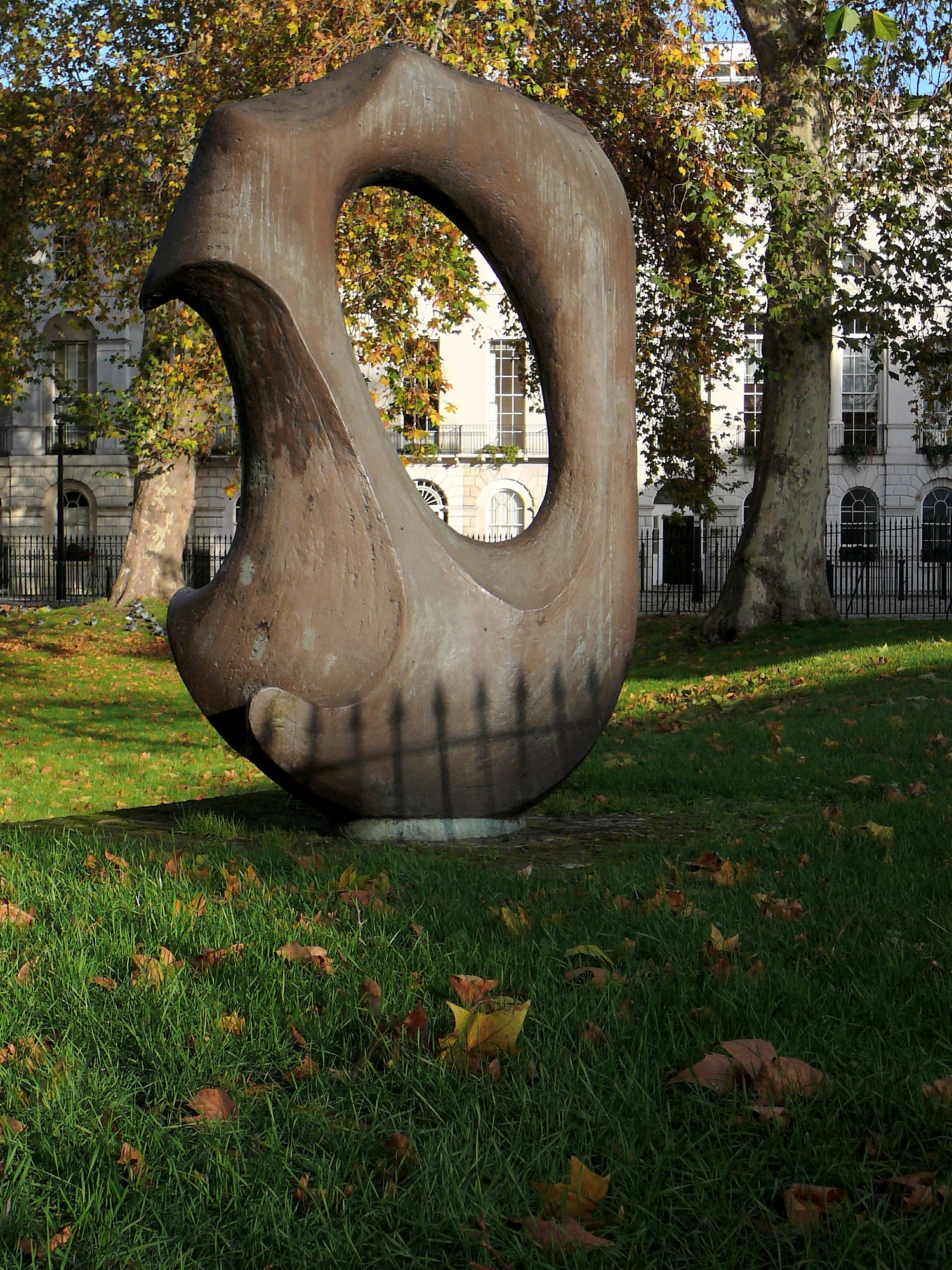
A sculpture by Naomi Blake in Fitzroy Square Garden

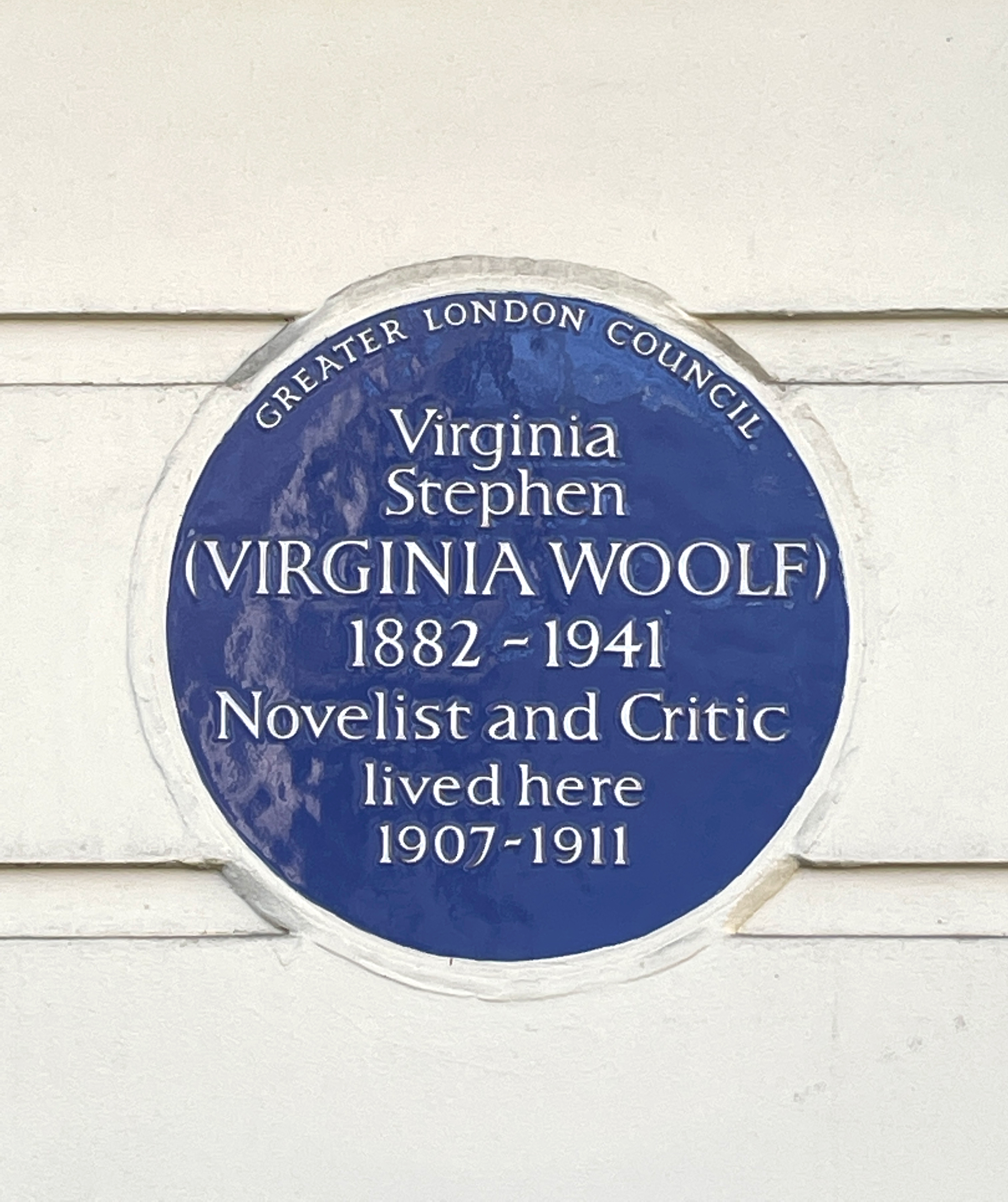
Virginia Woolf 1882-1941 Novelist and Critic lived here 1907–1911. Blue Plaque erected in 1974.

Fitzroy Square is a Georgian square in London, England. It is the only one in the central London area known as Fitzrovia. The square is one of the area's main features; this led to the surrounding district to be known as Fitzroy Square or Fitzroy Town and latterly as Fitzrovia, though the nearby Fitzroy Tavern is thought to have had as much influence on the name as Fitzroy Square.

== History ==
The square, nearby Fitzroy Street, and the Fitzroy Tavern in Charlotte Street have the family name of Charles FitzRoy, 2nd Duke of Grafton, into whose ownership the land passed through his marriage. His descendant Charles FitzRoy, 1st Baron Southampton developed the area during the late 18th and early 19th century.

Fitzroy Square was a speculative development intended to provide London residences for aristocratic families, and was built in four stages. Leases for the eastern and southern sides, designed by Robert Adam, were granted in 1792; building began in 1794 and was completed in 1798 by Adam's brothers James and William. These buildings are fronted in Portland stone brought by sea from Dorset.

The Napoleonic Wars and a slump in the London property market brought a temporary stop to construction of the square after the south and east sides were completed. According to the records of the Squares Frontagers' Committee, 1815 residents looked out on "vacant ground, the resort of the idle and profligate". Another contemporary account describes the incomplete square:

The houses are faced with stone, and have a greater proportion of architectural excellence and embellishment than most others in the metropolis. They were designed by the Adams, but the progress of the late war prevented the completion of the design. It is much to be regretted, that it remains in its present unfinished state.

The northern and western sides were subsequently constructed in 1827–29 and 1832–35 respectively, and are stucco-fronted.

The south side suffered bomb damage during World War II and was rebuilt with traditional facades to remain in keeping with the rest of the square.

== Present day ==
The square was largely pedestrianised in the 1970s, as part of a scheme designed by Sir Geoffrey Jellicoe and undertaken as part of environmental improvement works. In 2008 the square was upgraded by relaying most of the surface at a single level, removing street clutter such as bollards, and further restricting vehicular access.

The square is at the heart of the Fitzrovia conservation area and is the subject of the Fitzroy Square conservation area appraisal and management strategy adopted by the London Borough of Camden in March 2010.

== Notable buildings ==
The square has a number of notable buildings, many with distinguished connections marked by blue plaques. Numbers 1, 1A, 2–8 and 33–40 are grade I listed buildings.

- No. 6 holds the office and library of The Georgian Group.
- No. 7 was the home of Sir Charles Eastlake, first director of the National Gallery.
- No. 8 was the home of the painter James McNeill Whistler.
- No. 9 was the home of chemist August Wilhelm von Hofmann (1818–1892).
- No. 11 for varying lengths of time housed the offices of publishers Cresset Press, Merlin Press, and Allison and Busby in the latter 1960s. Later it was the home of novelist Ian McEwan.
- Nos. 13–14 were home to St Luke's Hospital for the Clergy (1904–2009).
- Nos. 16-18 were formerly The Home Hospital, subsequently the headquarters of the charity Scope.
- No. 19 belonged to the architect James Lockyer who died in the house in 1875. It was then the base for the "International School" run by Louise Michel in the 1890s. Later it was the home of Bloomsbury Group artist Duncan Grant (c. 1909).
- No. 20 is the headquarters of the Rugby League International Federation.
- No. 21 was the home of English statesman and Prime Minister Lord Salisbury. It is now occupied by the High Commission of Mozambique.
- No. 23 is the Embassy of Liberia.
- No. 25 was the site of a police raid in 1927 on the basement flat, rented by the gay dancer Bobby Britt, who was convicted of keeping a disorderly house and sentenced to 15 months' hard labour.
- No. 27 was the home of theatre critic and occasional Shaw collaborator William Archer.
- No. 28 was the headquarters of the Magistrates' Association until 2017.
- No. 29 was the home of George Bernard Shaw from 1887 until his marriage in 1898; and later of Virginia Woolf from 1907 to 1911.
- No. 33 housed Roger Fry's Omega Workshop, creating avant-garde furniture from 1913 to 1919. During this period the upper floor flat was home to Eva Gore-Booth and Esther Roper.
- No. 34–35, owned by Guy Ritchie, was controversially squatted as the London Free School in 2011.
- No. 37 was the home of the artist Sir William Quiller Orchardson from 1862, an address he shared for three years with John Pettie. Later it was the home of the artist Ford Madox Brown and childhood home of his grandson, the writer Ford Madox Ford.

== Notable residents ==
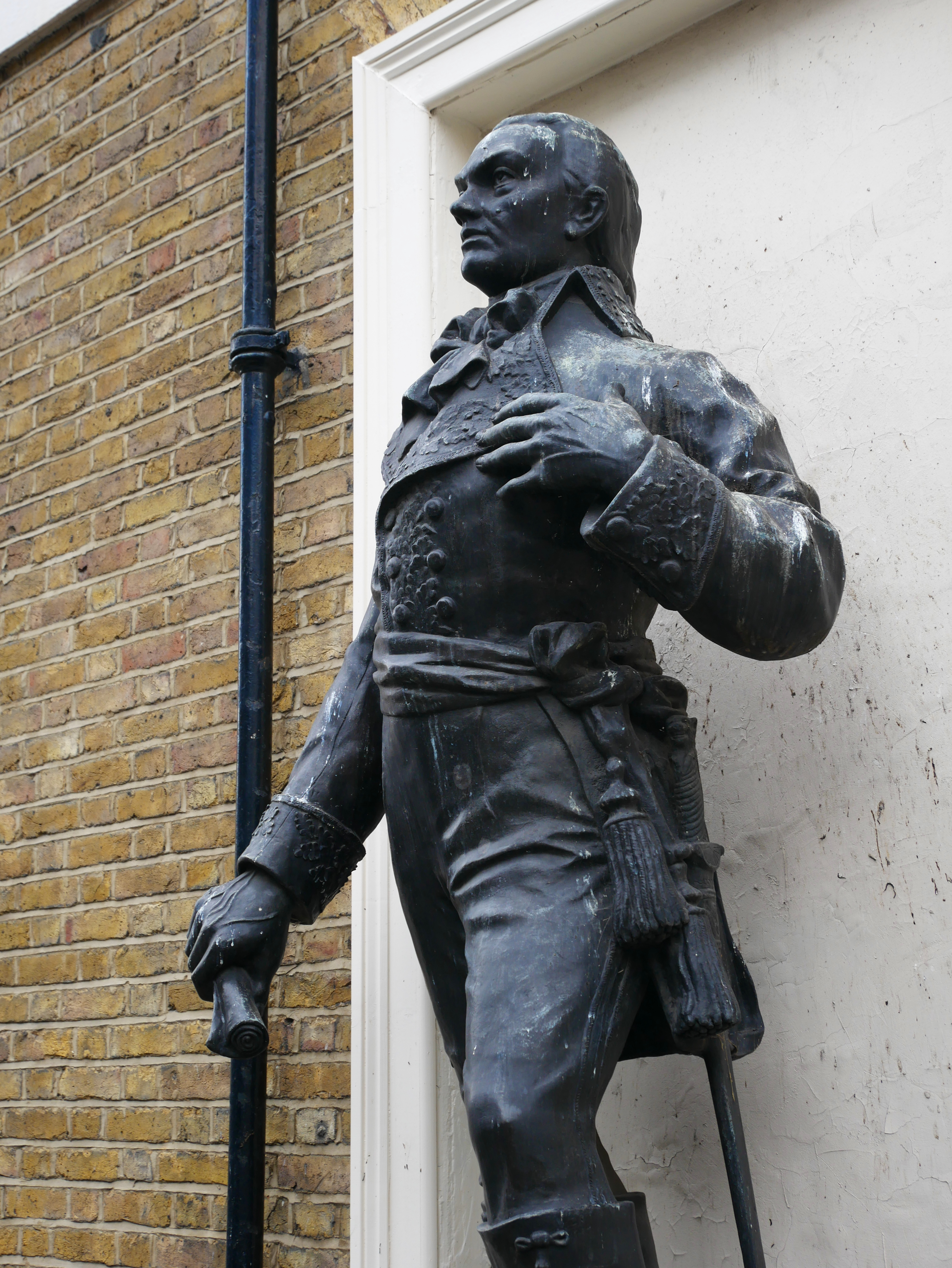
Statue of Francisco de Miranda in Fitzroy Street, London.

In addition to those above:

- General Francisco de Miranda lived at nearby 58 Grafton Way (1802–10). On the corner of 40 Fitzroy Square is a statue of him, a copy of a work by the Venezuelan sculptor Rafael de la Cova.
- Epidemiologist William Farr (1807–1883) established his first medical practice in Fitzroy Square.
- William Nisbet (1759–1822), Scottish physician and medical writer, practised in Fitzroy Square after 1801.
- Spandau Ballet's Gary Kemp lives there.
- The thriller writer Reg Gadney lived there with his restaurant critic wife Fay Maschler.
- Until recently the clothing designer Linda Bennett owned a Grade I listed house in the Square.
- The Welsh comedian, writer and television personality Griff Rhys Jones is a resident.
- Chad Gould, English-Filipino footballer, lives there.

== Culture and media ==
The square is described in William Makepeace Thackeray's Vanity Fair as the "Anglo-Indian district", where many retired officials of the civil service in India resided.

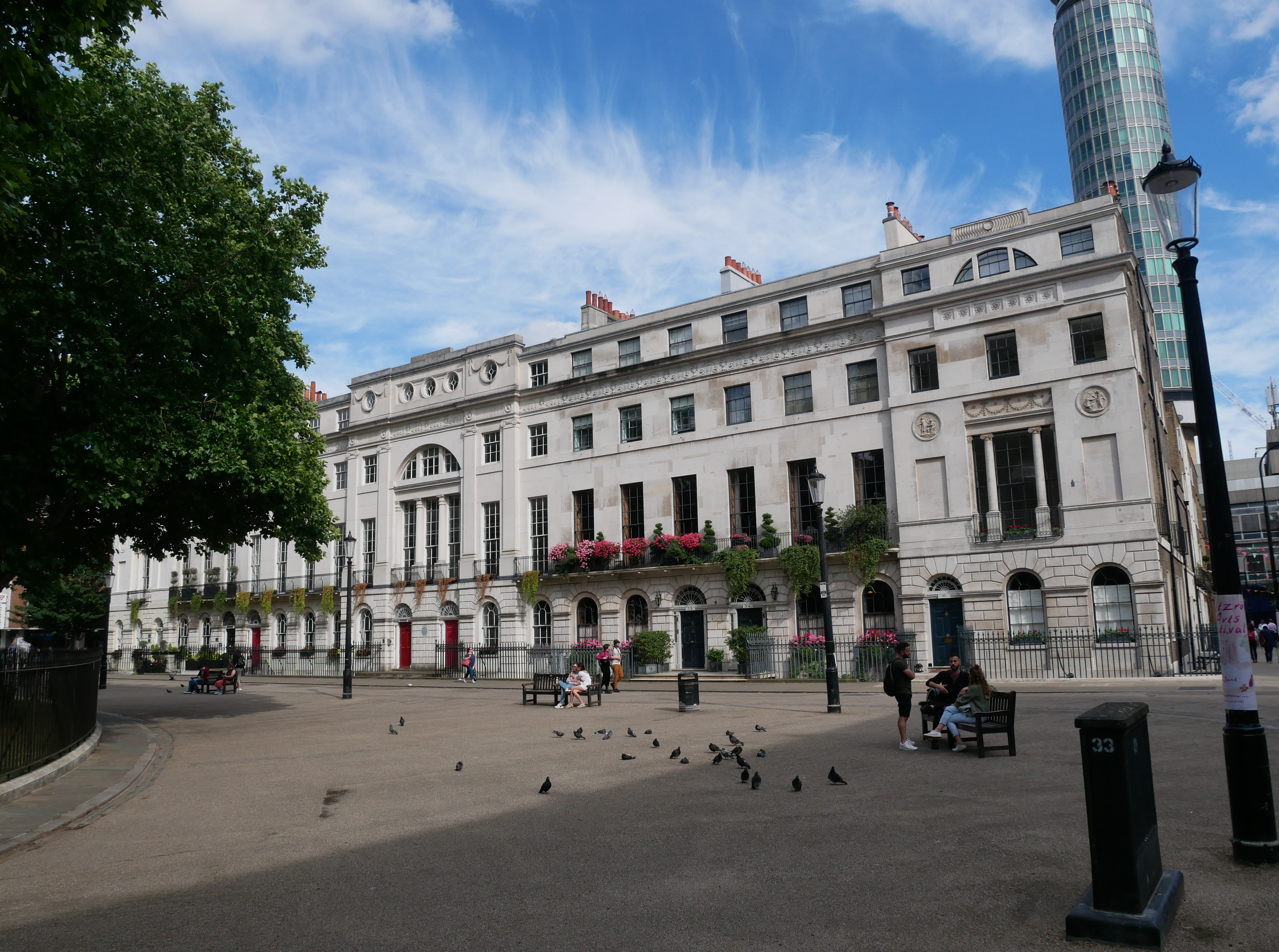
33 to 40 Fitzroy Square, built c.1792-8, and now Grade I listed

It was a filming location for the BBC's 2009 adaptation of Jane Austen's novel Emma.

C. R. W. Nevinson painted a view of Fitzroy Square from the window of society hostess Mrs Aria, evidently looking east from the Conway Street corner of the square.

On the south-west side of the square's central gardens is a fibreglass sculpture created by Naomi Blake to commemorate Queen Elizabeth II’s Silver Jubilee in 1977.

Until April 2011, No. 11 was the long-term home of author Ian McEwan, who set much of his 2005 novel Saturday, and the home of its leading character, brain surgeon Henry Perowne, in the square.

Novelist Jacqueline Winspear gives her 1920s detective Maisie Dobbs an office in Fitzroy Square.

The TARDIS stands in Fitzroy Square for the duration of the 1966 Doctor Who series The War Machines.

The Monty Python team had an office at No. 20 between 1973 and 1974.

The 2017 film Phantom Thread was set and filmed primarily in a home on Fitzroy Square.

In March 2023, scenes of the film Back to Black were filmed in Fitzroy Square.

== See also ==
- List of eponymous roads in London
- Squares in London
