= James Nesbitt (disambiguation) =

James Nesbitt (born 1965) is an actor from Northern Ireland.

James Nesbitt may also refer to:

- James Nesbitt (athlete) (1913–1992), British discus thrower in the 1948 Olympics
- James Nesbitt (bushranger) (1858–1879), Australian robber
- Jim Nesbitt (1931–2007), American country music singer
- Jimmy Nesbitt (police officer) (1934–2014), Royal Ulster Constabulary Detective Chief Inspector
- J. Aird Nesbitt (c. 1907–1985), Canadian department store owner

== See also ==
- James Nisbet (disambiguation)
