= Fairman Building =

- U.S. National Register of Historic Places
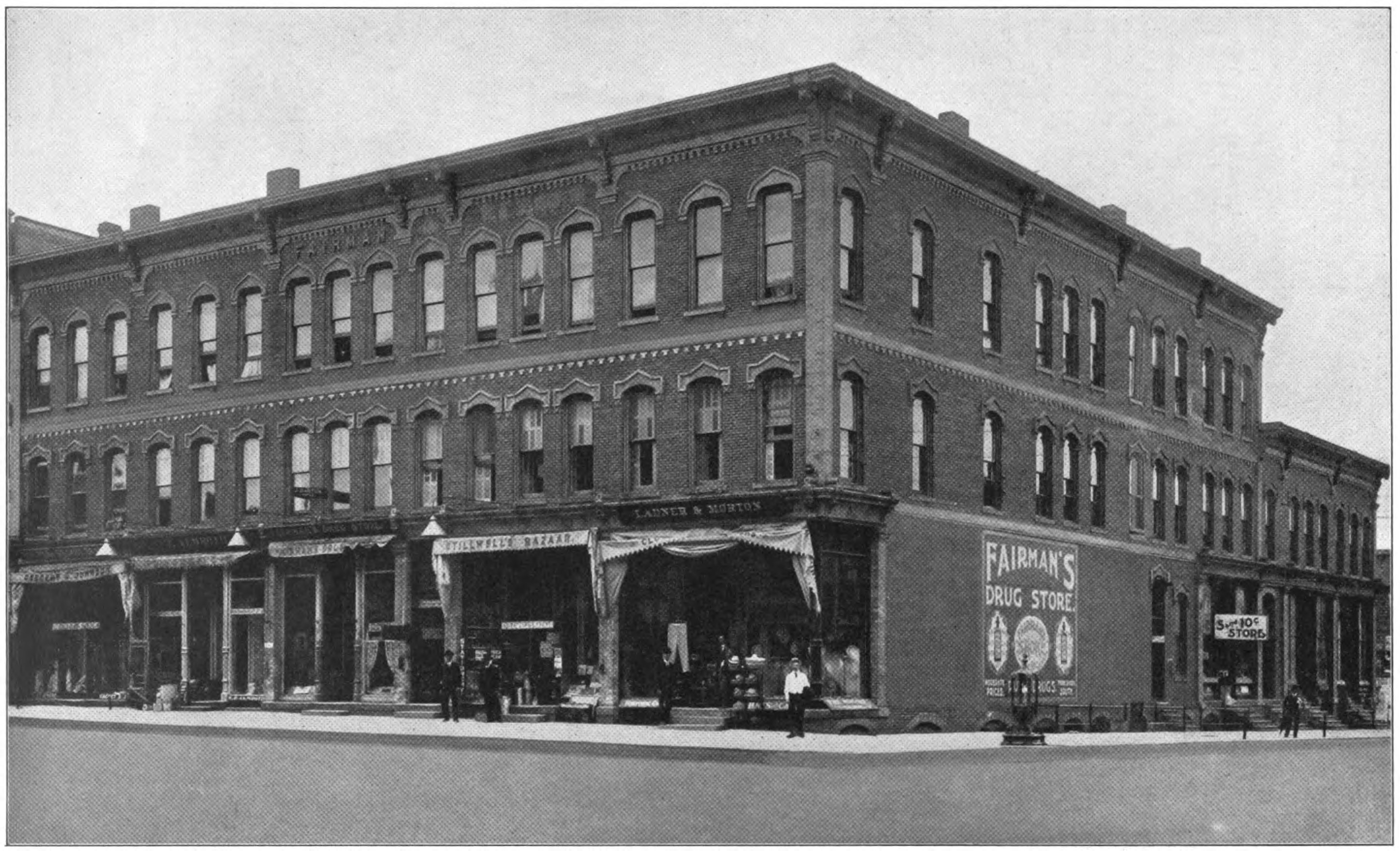
- Fairman Building c. 1906

- Location within Michigan Location within the United States
- Interactive map
- Location: 102-106 S. Michigan Ave., Big Rapids, Michigan
- Coordinates: 43°41′53″N 85°28′54″W
- Area: less than one acre
- Built: 1880
- Built by: Crocker & Hudnutt
- Architect: Crocker & Hudnutt
- Architectural style: Italianate
- NRHP reference No.: 87000072
- Added to NRHP: February 12, 1987

The Fairman Building is a commercial building located at 102-106 South Michigan Avenue in Big Rapids, Michigan. It was listed on the National Register of Historic Places in 1987.

== History ==
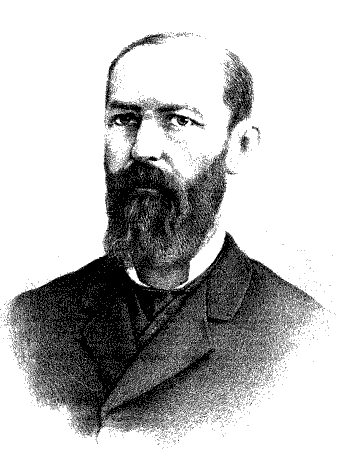
Ferdinand Fairman

Ferdinand Fairman was born in Lyme, New York in 1833. He became a teacher, and in 1855 married Julia Waters; the couple had three children. In 1859, Fairman purchased a general store in Alexandria, New York and successfully ran it until 1871, when he liquidated his assets and moved to Adams, New York to further educate his children. Over the next two years, Fairman travelled in different parts of the US to ascertain where an advantageous place to move. He finally settled on Big Rapids, and in 1873 moved from New York to Big Rapids. Fairman first took a position as cashier at a local bank, but soon became involved in a substantial amount of real estate, investment, and other non-lumbering activities in what was then a primarily lumbering town. In 1875, he and Samuel Potter, another New York transplant, established a private bank; in 1879 Potter retired and Fairman bought him out.

In 1880, Fairman hired the Big Rapids firm of Crocker and Hudnutt to design and build this commercial block; his bank was located in the building until its dissolution in the early 1890s. The Fairman Building remains the largest commercial block in Big Rapids.

In 2003, the Fairman Building, along with the nearby Nisbett Building, were refurbished into senior citizen housing, and are now known as the Nisbett-Fairman Residences.

== Description ==
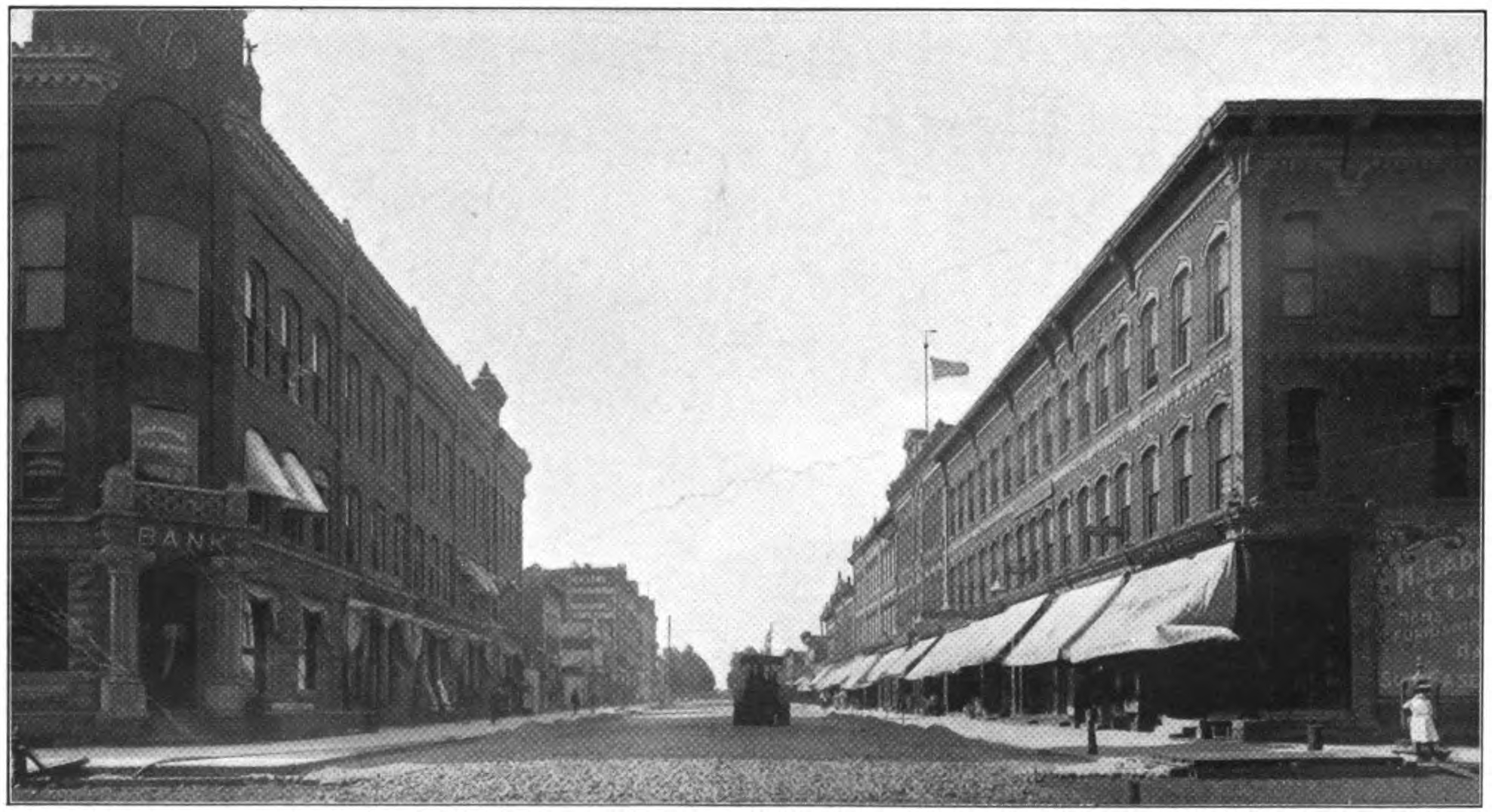
Nisbett Building (left) and Fairman Building (right), c. 1906

The Fairman Building is a three-story rectangular red brick Italianate commercial block. It is located at the intersection of Maple and South Michigan, and has two main facades, with five three-bay storefronts and single-bay entryway to the upper floors on South Michigan and four three-bay storefronts on Maple. The facade is accentuated with buff-colored brick work at the corners. A metal cornice supported with brackets runs across the top; the brackets provide a delineation between the storefronts on each facade.
