= George Carre, Lord Nisbet =

Scottish lawyer and Lord of Session (1700–1766)

The Hon George Carre, Lord Nisbet (c. 1700 – 1766) was an 18th-century Scottish lawyer who rose to be a Senator of the College of Justice and a Lord of Session.

== Life ==
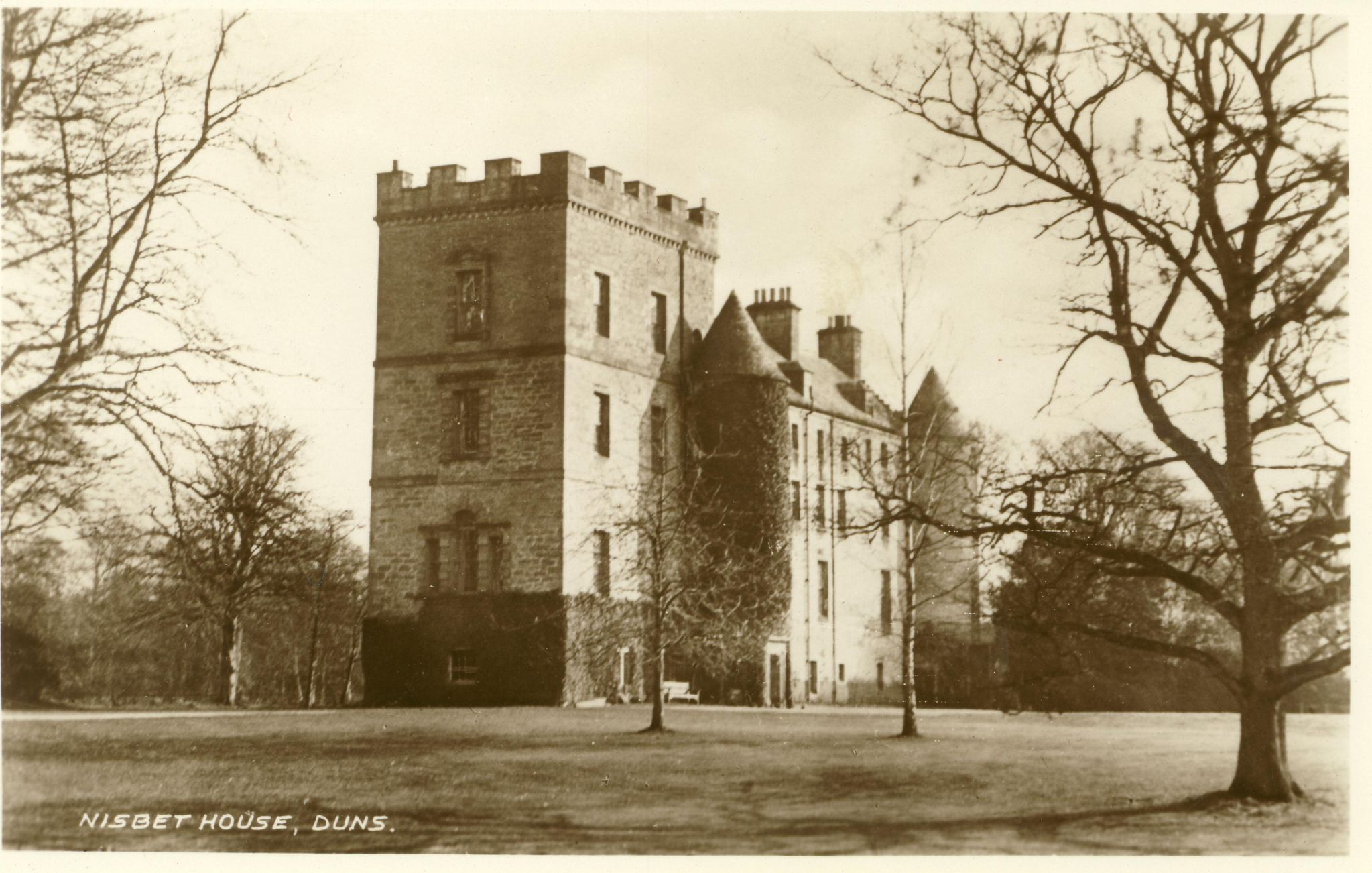
Nisbet House in 1935. The 18th-century tower is on the left hand side

He was the son of John Carre or Ker (died 1737) of Cavers and West Nisbet, near Duns in the Scottish Borders, and his second wife "Miss Home" daughter of Andrew Hume, Lord Kimmerghame. He was raised at Nisbet House.

He studied law at the University of Edinburgh, and was an advocate in January 1725.

In 1727 he acquired and restored a ruinous tenement in Edinburgh (eventually compensating the Council for the acquisition in 1757). In 1733 he obtained lands at West Nisbet.

In 1737 David Hume corresponded with Carre, asking for employment as a governor to Carre's "cousins", Thomas Hamilton, 7th Earl of Haddington (1720–1794), and his travelling companion George Baillie (died 1738).

In 1748 he became Sheriff of Berwickshire.

In 1755 he succeeded Hew Dalrymple. Lord Drummore as a Senator of the College of Justice.

He died in Edinburgh on 21 February 1766. His brother, Andrew Carre, died at Nisbet three days later.

His position as Senator was filled by Sir David Dalrymple, Lord Hailes.

== Family ==
He was married with three unmarried daughters: Margaret, Grizel and Anne.
