= Naomi Blake =

British sculptor

- Born: Zisel Dum; 11 March 1924; Mukačevo, Czechoslovakia
- Died: 7 November 2018 (aged 94)
- Education: Hornsey School of Art
- Website: www.naomiblake.co.uk/about.html

Naomi Blake née Zisel Dum (11 March 1924 – 7 November 2018) was a British sculptor, whose work reflected her experience as a Holocaust survivor.

== Biography ==
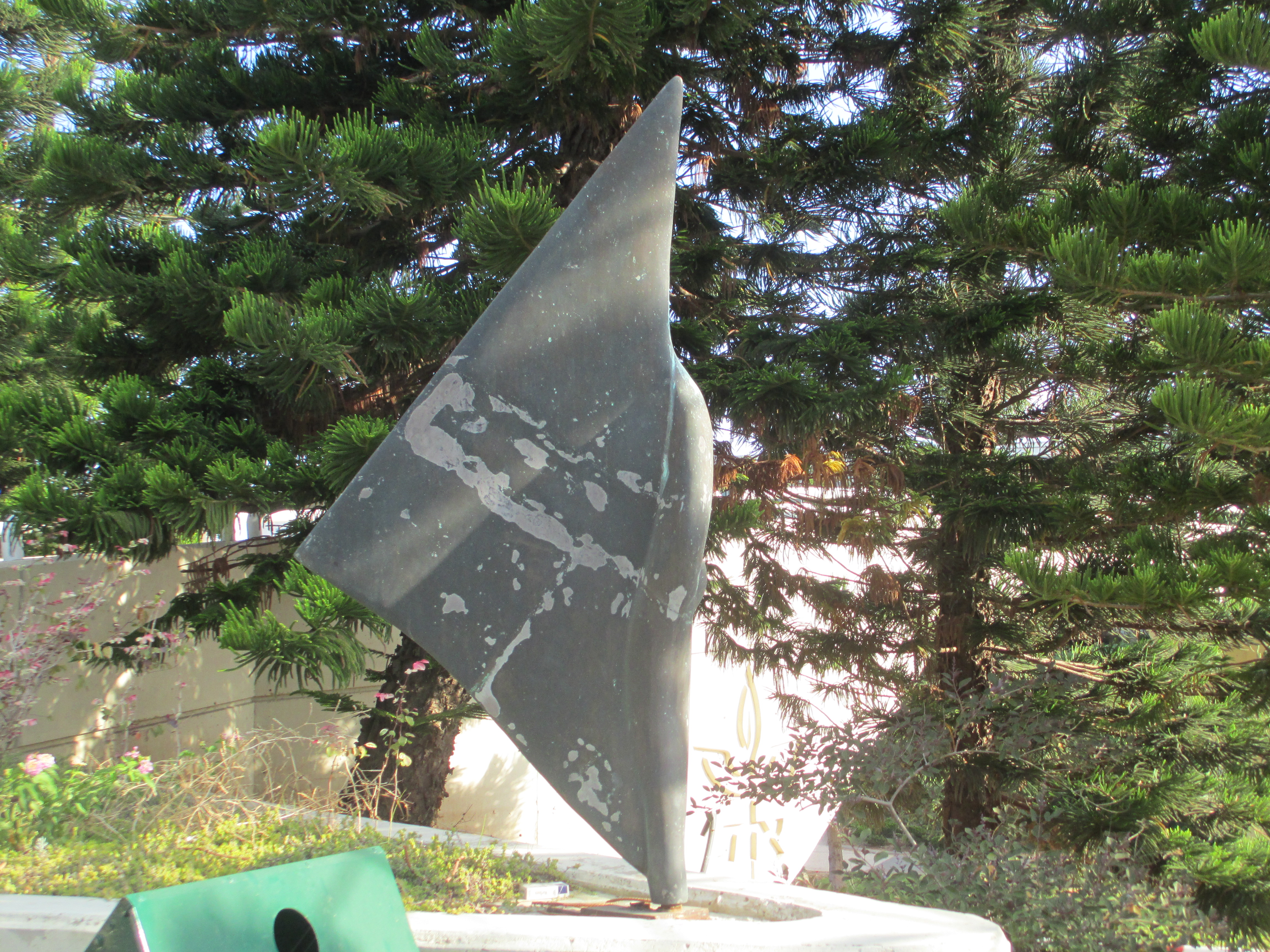
Man against the odds by Blake at Tel Aviv University

Blake was born in Mukačevo, Czechoslovakia (now Mukachevo, Ukraine) to orthodox Jewish parents, Elazer Dum and Chay–Adel Shlussel, on 11 March 1924. The youngest of ten children, Blake was originally named Zisel, meaning sweet, by her parents and changed her name to Naomi in 1948. She survived the Holocaust as a teenager in Auschwitz, although many members of her family died there. After Auschwitz, Blake and her surviving sister, Malchi, were sent to work at a munitions camp in the north of Nazi Germany occupied Poland. As the Red Army advanced in early 1945 the camp's inmates were marched towards the Baltic by the German Nazi army. The sisters managed to escape this death march and eventually made their way, despite considerable dangers, back to Mukačevo. In 1942, her family included 32 members: four grandparents, her parents, nine siblings, six spouses and ten young nieces and nephews but by 1945 only eight members survived.

When the war ended, Blake boarded an illegal ship to make her way to Mandatory Palestine. The ship was intercepted by the British and Blake was held at the Atlit detainee camp near Haifa. When she was released she joined the Palmach but was shot in the neck by a British soldier in April 1947. Recovering in hospital she began carving small figurines which soon became a passion for her. In 1948 Blake joined the Women's Division of the Israel Defense Forces, serving with the rank of Sub-Lieutenant.

Blake then lived in Milan, Rome and Jerusalem, before marrying her second husband, Asher Blake, a German refugee, in 1952 and making their home at Muswell Hill in north London. Blake studied at the Hornsey School of Art in north London (now Middlesex University), from 1955 to 1960, taking evening classes.

== Work ==
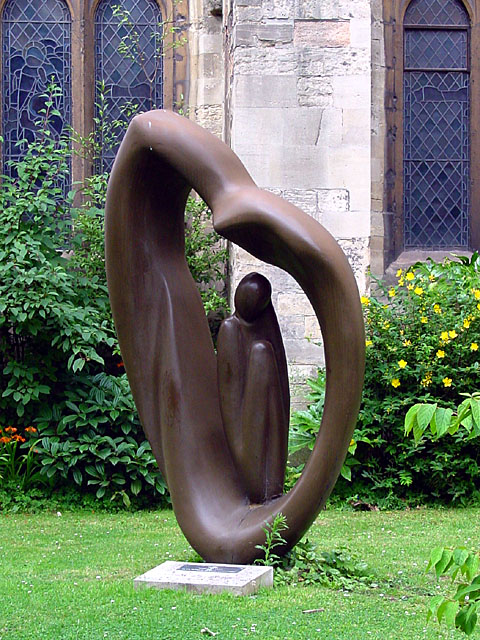
Refugee at Bristol Cathedral

Much of Blake's work has focused on the expression of her experiences. However her work is principally optimistic, forward-looking and positive. It stands determinedly to help keep alive the legacy of the six million slaughtered Jews, as well as promoting Blake's vision for uniting faiths, building understanding between religions and her hope for the future.

Blake has been exhibiting since 1962. Her work has been exhibited in many galleries, in the UK and overseas. Solo exhibitions of her work were held at the Woodstock Gallery in 1972, the Magdalene Street Gallery in 1976, Embankment Gallery in 1980 and at Norwich Cathedral in 1987, at the Royal West of England Academy in Bristol during 1989 and her work featured in the 1991 Chelmsford Cathedral festival.

Sculptures by Blake are permanently displayed on many sites, notably Fitzroy Square and St Ethelberga's Church in London, the University of Leicester Scarman Centre and The Holocaust Centre, Nottinghamshire. Her 1980 bronze resin sculpture, The Refugee is located in the garden of Bristol Cathedral while a similar 1985 piece, Sanctuary in fibreglass is in the grounds of St Botolph's Aldgate in the City of London. Her works are also in various private collections, including those of the Queen Mother and the Prince of Wales. She was a member of the Royal British Society of Sculptors. Examples of her sculptures are held by the Ben Uri Gallery & Museum in London while other works are sited in public spaces in London, Leicester, Bristol and elsewhere.
