= Nisbett Building =

- U.S. National Register of Historic Places
- Michigan State Historic Site
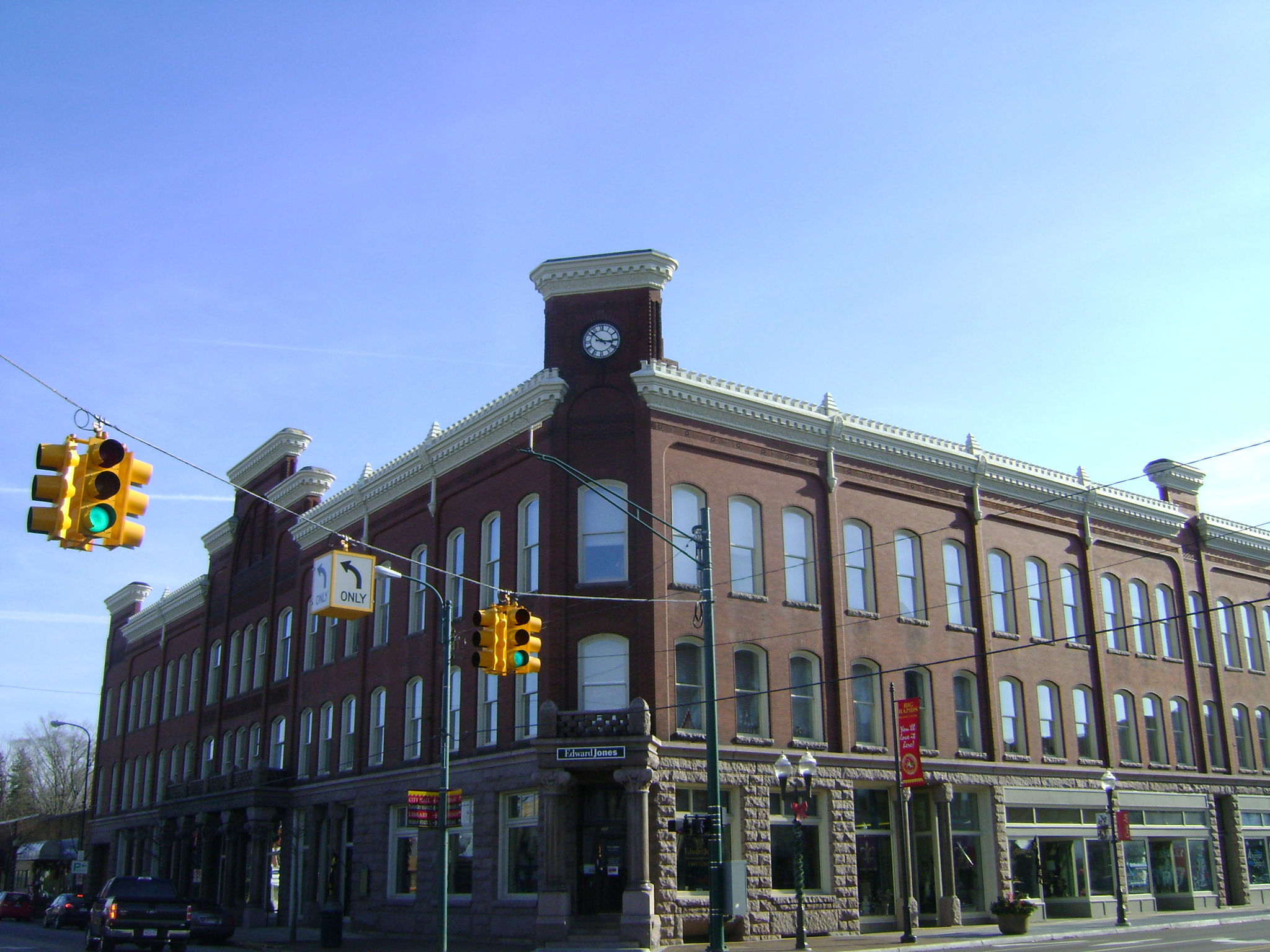

- Location within Michigan Location within the United States
- Interactive map
- Location: 101 S. Michigan Ave., Big Rapids, Michigan
- Coordinates: 43°41′53″N 85°28′54″W
- Area: less than one acre
- Built: 1885
- Architectural style: Late Victorian
- NRHP reference No.: 86003452

Significant dates
- Added to NRHP: December 4, 1986
- Designated MSHS: August 12, 1977

The Nisbett Building is a commercial building located at 101 South Michigan Avenue in Big Rapids, Michigan. It was designated a Michigan State Historic Site in 1977 and listed on the National Register of Historic Places in 1986.

== History ==
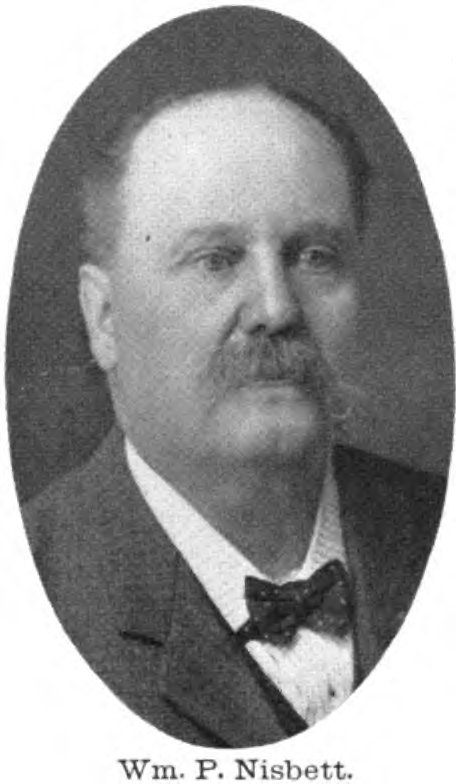
William P Nisbett

In 1885, Daniel F. Comstock, a leading Big Rapids businessman, began construction on this building. He spent $150,000 enclosing the building and finishing the Maple Street facade; however, work on the building apparently halted due to the economic downturn in the 1890s. Comstock himself went bankrupt in 1896, and the building ownership was assumed by the Michigan Trust Company of Grand Rapids. The Trust sold the building to William P. Nisbett, a retired newspaper editor from Big Rapids, in 1900 for $20,000.

Nisbett was born in London in 1847, and in 1861 emigrated with his family to the United States. In 1863 the family moved to Pontiac, Michigan, and the next year William Nisbett served briefly in the 16th Michigan Volunteer Infantry Regiment. In 1869, he established a newspaper in Pontiac, where he worked until 1880. In 1882, he purchased the Big Rapids Herald, where he worked until his retirement in 1900.

Nisbett hired Grand Rapids builder J. H. Fisher to complete construction, including a hotel in one section of the building. In 1929, the eastern portion of the building was demolished in a fire.

In 2003, the Nisbett Building, along with the nearby Fairman Building, were refurbished into senior citizen housing, and are now known as the Nisbett-Fairman Residences.

== Description ==
The Nisbett Building is a three-story rectangular Late Victorian brick commercial block. It is located the intersection of Michigan and Maple. There are four entryways, each topped with a parapet. The main entrance is through a four-bay porch supported by Corinthian columns; a second corner entry opens into a bank lobby. The arched windows have wooden sashes, and are arranged in three-bay configurations.

== Gallery ==
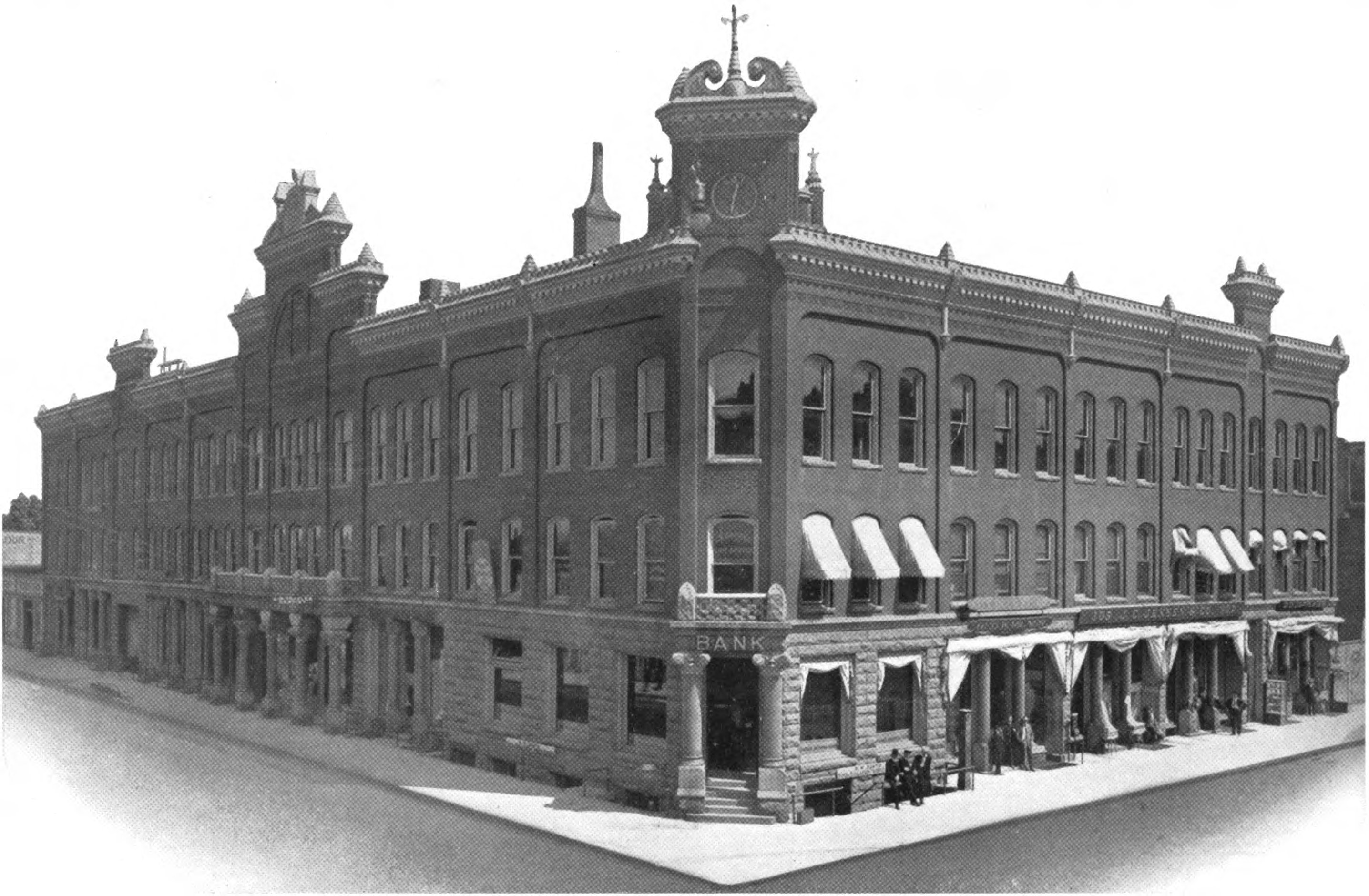
Nisbett Building, c. 1906

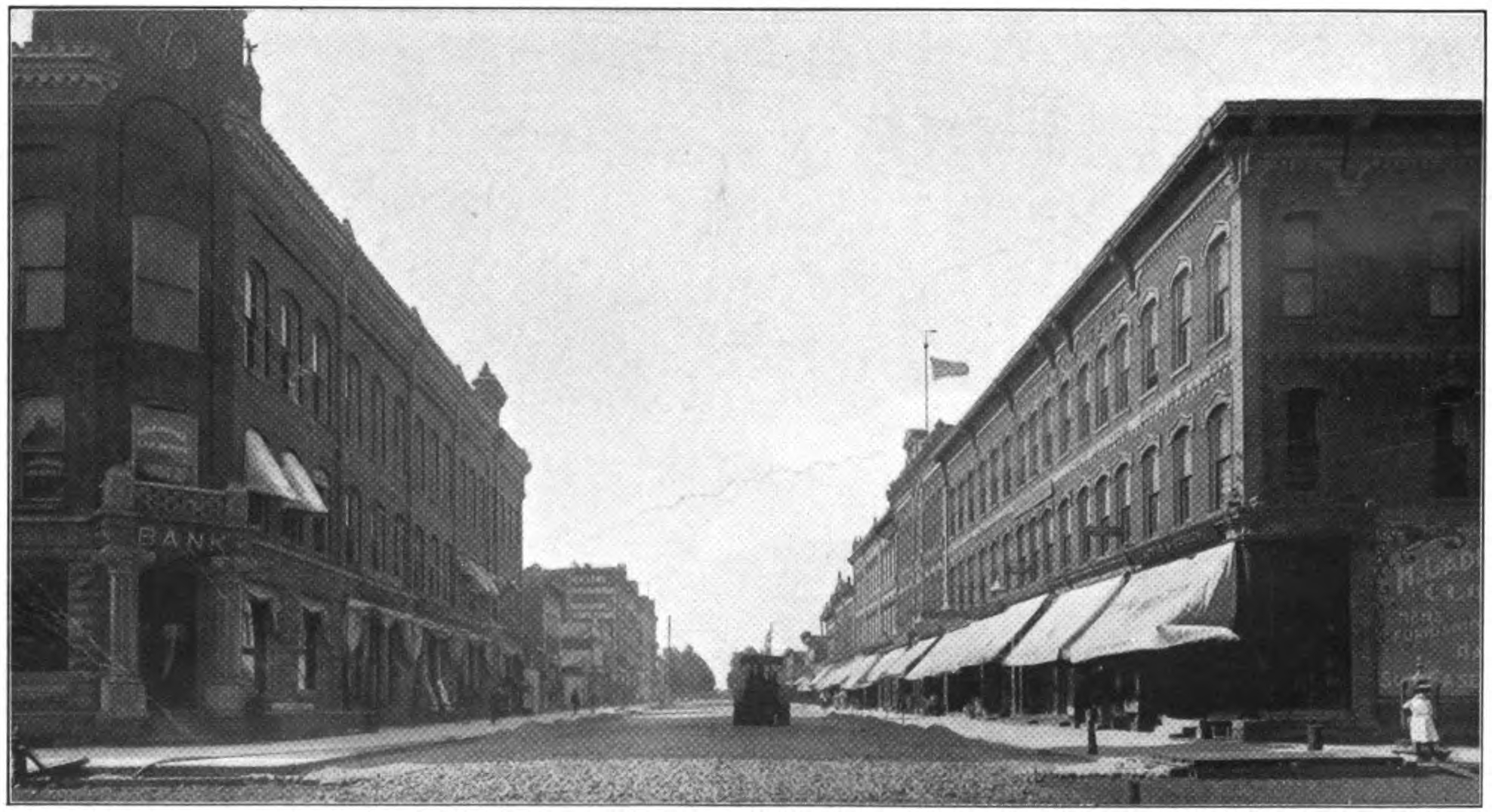
Nisbett Building (left) and Fairman Building (right), c. 1906
