= Charles Nisbet =

Scottish-American academic and churchman (1736–1804)

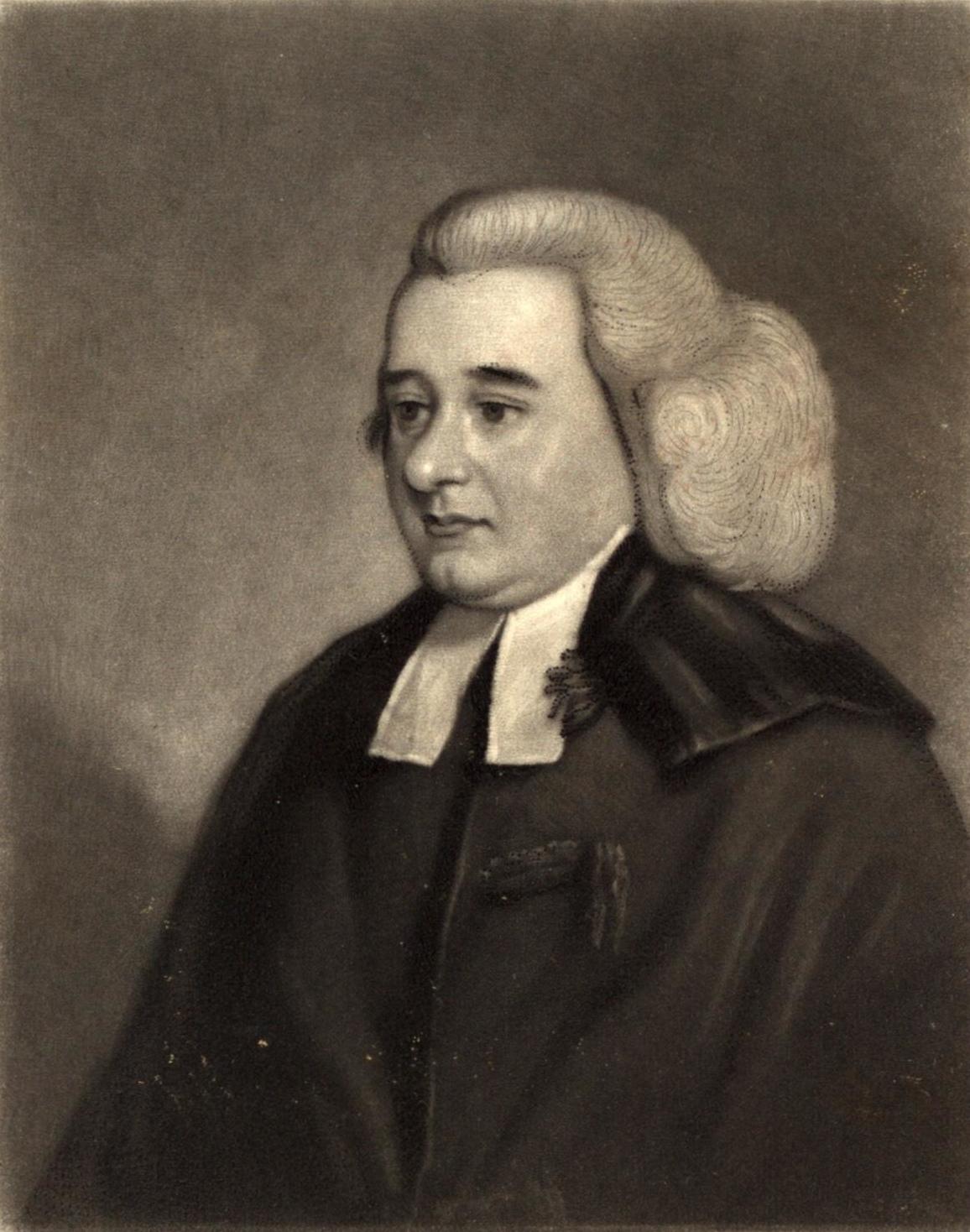
- Born: January 21, 1736; Haddington, Scotland
- Died: January 18, 1804 (aged 67); Carlisle, Pennsylvania, U.S.
- Education: University of Edinburgh
- Occupations: Academic; clergyman
- Years active: 1760–1804
- Spouse: Anne Tweedie (m. 1766)
- Children: 4, including Alexander

Charles Nisbet (January 21, 1736 – January 18, 1804) was a Scottish-American academic and churchman, and the first Principal of Dickinson College.

== Early life and education ==
Charles Nisbet was born in Haddington, Scotland, on January 21, 1736, the son of William Nisbet (physician) and Alison Hepburn. His father was a schoolteacher at Long Yester near Haddington, East Lothian, Scotland. By 1754, Charles Nisbet had completed studies at both the High School and the University of Edinburgh and had entered Divinity Hall to prepare for the ministry.

== Career ==
He was licensed by the Presbytery of Edinburgh on September 24, 1760. On May 17, 1764, he was ordained to the parish church of Montrose. Nisbet was an outspoken evangelical and sympathiser with the American Revolution. Anti-Catholic in his view, he was questioned after the Gordon Riots.

Nisbet's old friend John Witherspoon was the head of Princeton College; and the college in 1783 awarded Nisbet the honorary degree of Doctor of Divinity. This caused the Trustees of Dickinson College to turn their attention to him for the new institution in Carlisle, Pennsylvania. Persuaded by Benjamin Rush and John Dickinson, Nisbet accepted the position and sailed from Greenock with his family on April 23, 1785. They arrived in Philadelphia on June 9, and in Carlisle on July 4, where the town greeted them. In the height of a humid Pennsylvania summer, the entire family fell ill with a fever. Given Carlisle's muddy frontier appearance and weather, Nisbet seriously considered returning to Scotland, but was persuaded to remain.

Nisbet was unanimously re-elected as principal on May 9, 1786. For the following eighteen years, his efforts to build the new institution were untiring.

== Death ==
On New Year's Day, 1804 he contracted a cold, which progressed to pneumonia. Nisbet died in Carlisle two and a half weeks later on January 18, 1804. At the funeral a sermon was preached and a Latin ode to his memory was given. A monument was erected to his memory by his son Alexander.

== Personal life ==
In 1766, Nisbet married Anne Tweedie. The Nisbets had four children: Thomas, Mary, Alison (1773) and Alexander (1777). His son Alexander Nisbet born 1777 was a founding member of the St Andrews Society of Baltimore in 1806.
