= John Nesbett =

John Nesbett (fl. 15th century) was a composer of the English votive style, whose setting of the Magnificat is represented in the Eton Choirbook.

== Life ==
Nesbett's career is relatively unknown. His only recorded position is as master of the Lady Chapel at Canterbury Cathedral from 1475 to 1488. His only surviving work, his Magnificat, is quasi-canonical and is decidedly archaic, possibly representing the first phase of the development of the English votive style.

== Works ==
- Magnificat for 5 voices
