= William Nisbet (physician) =

Scottish physician

William Nisbet (1759–1822) was a Scottish medical doctor notable for having authored many widely used medical books that emphasized practice. Nisbet earned his MD degree at Aberdeen (1785) and became a member of the Royal College of Surgeons of Edinburgh (1786). He eventually moved to London where he practised in Fitzroy Square after 1801. Aside from his publications, there is very little historical record of his life.

Among his books were:

- First Lines of the Theory and Practice in Venereal Diseases (1787)
- An Inquiry into the Cure of Scrophula and Cancer (1795)
- The Clinical Guide (1800)
- On the Diseases of Infancy and Childhood (1800)
- A Practical Treatise on Diet (1801)
- A Medical Guide for the Invalid to the Principal Watering Places of Great Britain (1804)

== Work ==
- The new domestic medicine: or, a treatise on the prevention and cure of diseases, by regimen and simple medicines; with an appendix, containing a dispensatory for the use of private practitioners; with a supplement, containing The life of Lewis Cornaro. London: Kelly, 1840. Digital edition of the University and State Library Düsseldorf
