= Roxanne Nesbitt =

Canadian interdisciplinary artist

Roxanne Nesbitt is a Canadian interdisciplinary artist who works in intersections between sound and design. Born in Edmonton, Alberta, of Indo-Caribbean and European mixed ancestry, she holds a Bachelor of Music from University of Alberta and a Masters of Architecture from UBC. Her work involves creating handmade instruments, composition, improvisation, sound installation, and performance. Her compositions have premiered internationally, including at Gadeamus Muziekweek in Utrecht, and at Bauchhund in Berlin; additionally, she received an honorable mention in Musicworks' 2020 Electronic Music Competition. She makes her home on Coast Salish territory in Vancouver, where, in addition to her practice, she is co-director of Currently Arts Society, a community organization prioritizing under-represented artists.

== Early life and education ==
Roxanne Nesbitt was born in Edmonton, Alberta. She completed a BMus with distinction in double bass performance in 2009 from the University of Alberta. However, her interests soon expanded outwards from performance into both technical and ephemeral inquisitions of sound, and in 2011, she moved to Vancouver and began the MArch program at the School of Architecture and Landscape Architecture at UBC. For her, music led the way towards architecture: “I remember starting to listen for the way my voice changed in different rooms and starting to think about rooms and space.”

While gaining practical architecture skills, she was also able to merge her existing sonic interests with design training, working in soundscape, sound generation, and instrument creation throughout her degree. Her MArch thesis, “Cacophony and Cadence: Listening to Architecture and the City” is summarized as a consideration of “the potentials of architecture to engage through sound, acting as a hinge between the kitsch conception of listening and the acoustic ecologist's comprehension of the soundscape.”

== Works ==
=== Instrument design ===
Working primarily in ceramics, Nesbitt creates sculptural pieces, sometimes called bells or moon bells, that create a spectrum of sounds described as “resonant magic.” In the artist statement for a gallery show called “Shape Studies,” at the Centre for New Music San Francisco, Nesbitt describes the potential of these instruments as such:

I believe that new instrument design can help empower all of us to explore music and sound free from the toxic perfectionism still prevalent in many types of music practices today. Perhaps, by exploring how to build and play new instruments, these untethered vessels can help us to focus more on the sound an instrument creates, rather than the success of playing it to an established standard.

The creation process is described as a combination of ancient tools, techniques and formulas, with an exploratory process, “privilege[ing] intuition.”

Nesbitt also has an on-going project called “Symbiotic Instruments” intended to create new sounds from old instruments by altering their form or adding elements, often also with ceramics. A recording exploring these sounds, together with musicians Ben Brown and Marielle Groven, was released on the Small Scale Music label from Montreal, Quebec, on Feb 24, 2023. It was described as a “symphony of chimes being clamored at a steady pace by the wind, while a prickly key motif winds itself up every few seconds.”

=== Installation ===
Nesbitt also works in the medium of installation art, often involving the placement or hanging of her instruments.

Wild Bells No. 5 is an installation of ceramic instruments made during a residency at the European Ceramic Work Centre in Oisterwijk, Netherlands, a renowned artist-in-residence centre for ceramics that has been facilitating the work of artists, designers and architects for over 50 years. Journalist Sara Constant describes the piece as:

dozens of flat ceramic pieces—some smooth, some perforated, others rippling with lava-like textures—... strung from the ceiling, each bent at a different angle. Light filters through the dangling objects, lending them a flexible yet fragile quality—as if, while folding in on themselves, they froze just before snapping.

=== Composition – notable works ===
Death and the Rest is a piece for a small orchestral ensemble in addition to prepared piano and extended percussion, using ceramic instruments designed by Nesbitt. It was composed for the Dutch contemporary music ensemble Modelo62 and premiered as part of the “Stubborn Resurgencies” program at the 2021 Gaudeamus Muziekweek festival.

Soft Storms Welcomed, composed for the Western Front's "Octophonic: Sound Immersion" concert in Feb 2019, is a work made from samples. Musicworks magazine named it an honorable mention in their 2020 Electronic Music Competition.

=== Graftician ===
Nesbitt also performs and releases music under the name Graftician, blending jazz, electronica and folk styles; combining drum machines with field recordings. The Graftician album, Mandarins, was released on June 14, 2019, at the Cultch Theatre in Vancouver, BC. Two previous albums, “wander/weave” and s/t were released in 2016 and 2014 respectively.
