= Nesbit, Northumberland =

Coordinates: 55.59512°N 2.02854°W

Nesbit
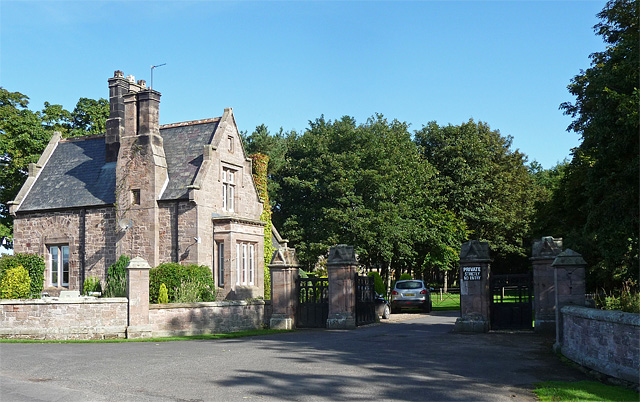
- Lodge near Fenton

- Location within Northumberland
- OS grid reference: NT983336
- Civil parish: Doddington
- Unitary authority: Northumberland
- Ceremonial county: Northumberland
- Region: North East
- Country: England
- Sovereign state: United Kingdom

Nesbit is a hamlet and former civil parish, now in the parish of Doddington, Northumberland, England. It was once the site of a medieval village. In maps published during the 17th to 19th centuries, the name of the settlement was variously spelled Nesbet, Nesbitt or Nesbit. In 1951 the parish had a population of 143.

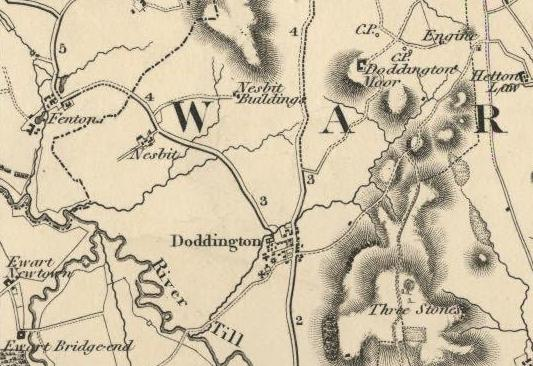
A detail from Greenwood's 1828 map of Northumberland showing Nesbit and Doddington

Nesbit is near the confluence of the Glen and Till rivers and the hypothesized location of one of King Arthur's battles against invading Anglo-Saxons. Latin documentation dating to 1242 lists "Dodington cum Nesebit membro suo" (Doddington with its member Nesbit) as among the holdings of Baron William de Vesci.

In 1346, Edward III granted land at Nesbit to Thomas Grey (or Gray) of Heaton after the rebellion of the previous holder, John de Trollope. Documents note the existence in 1415 of a defensive tower at Nesbit belonging to his grandson, Thomas Grey. However, in a 1541 survey it was observed that:

At Nesebytte (Nesebitt) there was a towre of thinheritaunce of Sir Roger Gray but yt is longe synce for laske of reparacons decayed & fallen and no fortresse there now remayneth.

During the 19th century, the township was productive farmland supporting a small community of workers. An 1855 survey of Northumberland reports as follows.

Nesbit township is situated four miles north by west of Wooler. It contains 776 acres, and the landowners are the Messrs. Clarke of Newcastle. The number of inhabitants in 1801, was 63; in 1811, 65; in 1821, 52; in 1831, 47; in 1841, 59 and in 1851, 63 souls.

Nesbit was formerly a township in Doddington parish, from 1866 Nesbit was a civil parish in its own right until it was abolished on 1 April 1955 and merged with Doddington.

Today, Nesbit is the site of a sheep farm with no visible trace of the medieval tower or village.

== See also ==
- Battle of Humbleton Hill
- Ford, Northumberland
- Yeavering
- Nisbet, Scottish Borders
