= Alexander Nisbet (antiquarian) =

Scottish lawyer and antiquarian

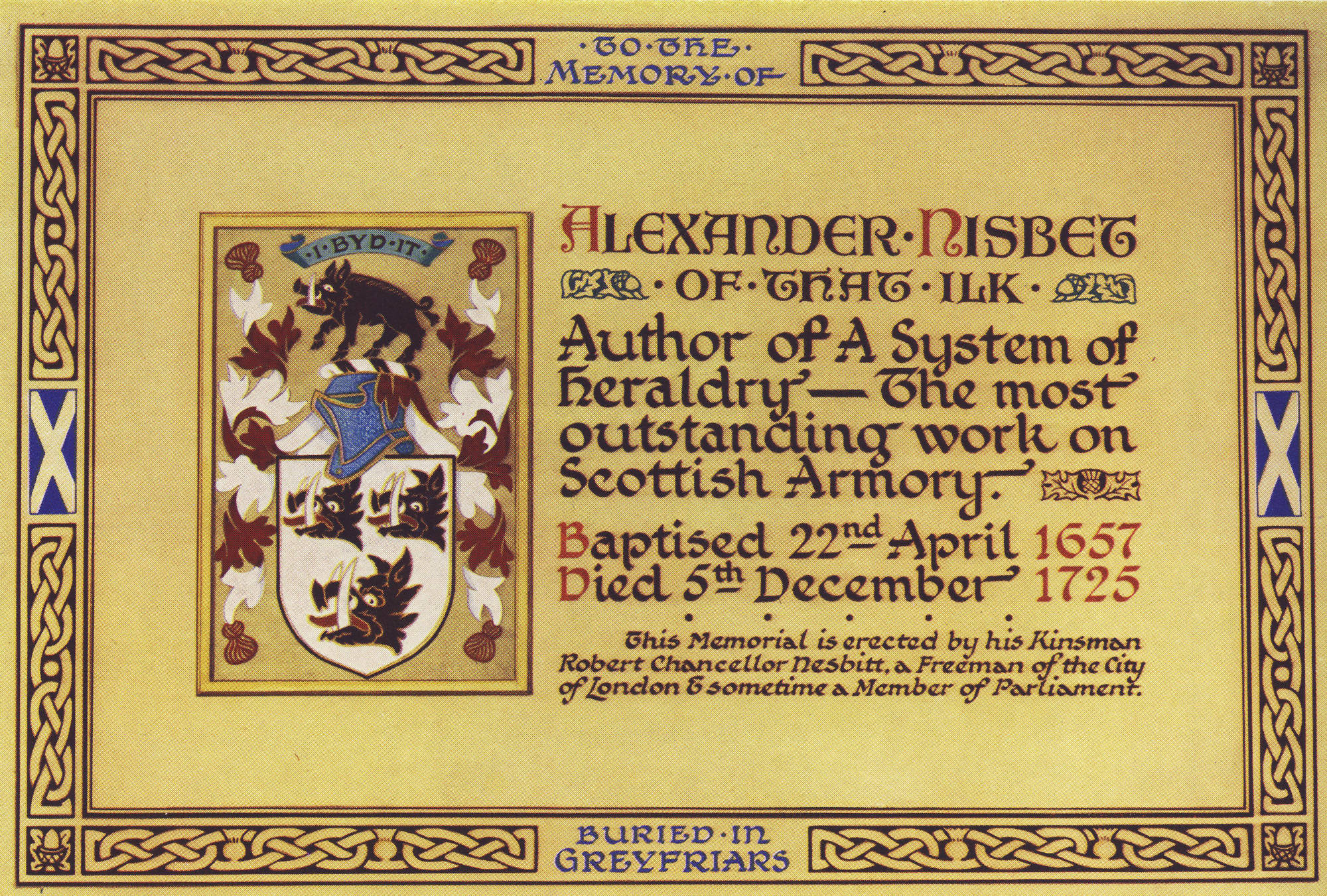
Memorial to Alexander Nisbet in Greyfriars Kirk, Edinburgh.

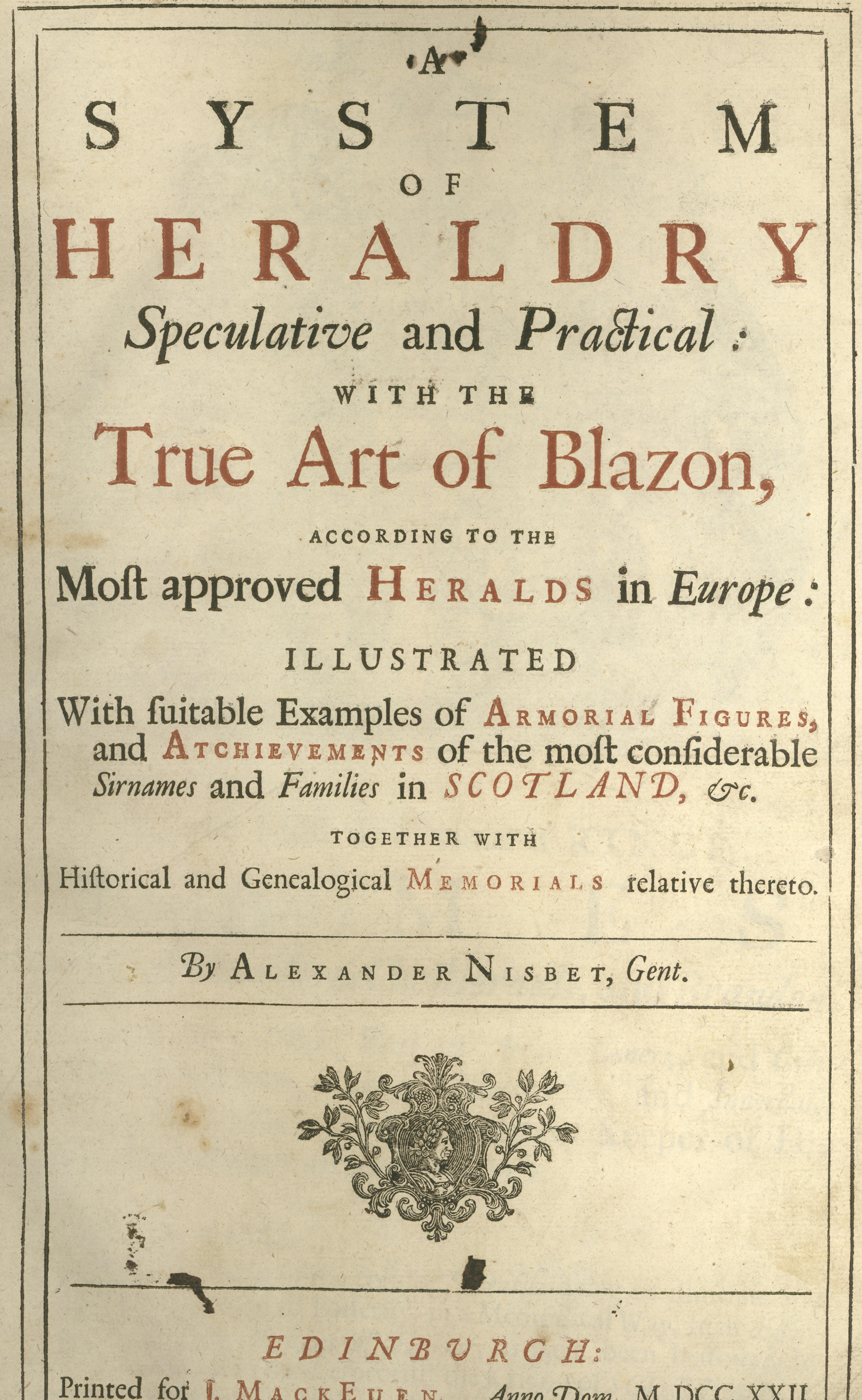
Title page of A System of Heraldry.

Alexander Nisbet (bapt. 23 March 1657; died 7 Dec. 1725) was a Scottish lawyer and antiquarian. He is remembered for his works on heraldry, which are considered to be some of the most complete and authoritative produced in the UK.

== Life ==
Nisbet was born in Edinburgh, the third of ten children of Adam Nisbet WS and his wife Janet, only daughter of Alexander Aikenhead WS. Adam, and later Alexander, were chiefs of the ancient Nisbet family, of Nisbet in Berwickshire; however, the family had recently lost much of their wealth due to their zealous support of King Charles in the civil war, and had been forced to sell their ancestral estate. In his Essay on Additional Figures and Marks of Cadency, Nisbet remarks that he "had a very early inclination to the study of herauldry, and when a boy ... looked on its figures with wonder, and often wish'd to know their names and signification."

Nisbet matriculated at the University of Edinburgh in 1675, where he studied philosophy. After graduating in 1682, he was employed as a solicitor for a number of years before giving it up in order to devote his full-time to his historical and heraldic studies. He later became a teacher, instructing various members of the nobility, including the Earl of Carnwrath.

Around the turn of the 18th century he set out to create a comprehensive treatise on heraldry. He initially intended to obtain funding via subscription, but finding that this would not produce enough money, he appealed to the Scottish Parliament for help. Though they promised him £248 6s 8d, this was never delivered, and the passing of the Act of Union put paid to any chance of further parliamentary assistance. Nisbet's System of Heraldry was finally published in 1722, over twenty years after he had first set out to write the work. He died three years later, likely in poverty, and was buried close to the Nisbet Tomb in Greyfriars Kirk, though the exact location is now lost. His contemporary George Crawford wrote of him: "he was a worthy, modest gentleman, who had as many friends and as few enemies as any man I have known." In 1934 his kinsman Robert Chancellor Nesbitt arranged for John Buchan to unveil a memorial plaque in Greyfriars, which can still be seen today.

Nisbet never married, and as such, the linear line of the Nisbets of that Ilk ended upon his death. The chiefly line was reestablished in 1995, in the favour of distant cousin Robert Anthony Ellis Nesbitt.

== Publications ==
- An Essay on Additional Figures and Marks of Cadency. Shewing, the Ancient and Modern Practice of Differencing Descendants in This and Other Nations. More Fully and Exactly, than Any Thing Hitherto Published upon This Part of Heraldry. (1702)
- Proposals for Printing an Essay of the Ancient and Modern Use of Armories. (1718?)
- An Essay on the Ancient and Modern Use of Armories; Shewing Their Origin, Definition, and Division of Them into Their Several Species. The Method of Composing Them and Marshalling Many Coats Together in One Shield. Illustrated by Many Examples and Sculptures of the Armorial Ensigns of Noble Families in This and Other Nations. To Which Is Added, an Index Explaining the Terms of Blazon Made Use of in This Essay. (1718)
- A System of Heraldry, Speculative and Practical: With the True Art of Blazon, According to the Most Approved Heralds in Europe: Illustrated with Suitable Examples of Armorial Figures, and Achievements of the Most Considerable Surnames and Families in Scotland, &c. Together with Historical and Genealogical Memorials Relative Thereto. (1722) - volume 1 - volume 2.
- Proposals for Printing by Subscription a Supplement and Appendix to the System of Heraldry, Speculative and Practical, lately published by Alexander Nisbet, Gent. (1723?)
