= Nesbit =

Nesbit may refer to:

== People ==
- E. Nesbit (Edith Nesbit) (1858–1924), English author and poet
- Bryson Nesbit (born 2002), American football player
- Evelyn Nesbit (1884–1967), American artists' model and chorus girl, and a central figure in a notorious murder trial
- Jamar Nesbit (born 1976), American football player
- Pinna Nesbit (1896–1950), Canadian silent film actress
- William Nesbit (thief) (1899–1983), American jewel thief
- Nesbit Willoughby (1777–1849), British naval officer
- "Mrs. Nesbit", the name given to Buzz Lightyear when he attends a tea party in the first Toy Story.

== Places ==
- Nesbit Township, Minnesota, a township in Polk County, in northwest Minnesota, United States
- Nesbit, Mississippi, a town located in DeSoto County in northwest Mississippi, United States
- Nesbit, Missouri, an unincorporated community
- Nesbit, Northumberland, a hamlet and former civil parish near Wooler, in Northumberland, England
- Nesbitt, Northumberland, a former civil parish, now in Stamfordham parish, near Prudhoe, England
- Battle of Nesbit Moor (1355), battle between Scottish raiders and English forces near the border
- Battle of Nesbit Moor (1402), battle between Scottish raiders and English forces near the border

== Things ==
- Nesbit partial, a unilateral removable partial denture

== See also ==
- Nisbet (disambiguation)
- Nesbitt (disambiguation)
