= Nisbet House =

Castle in Scottish Borders, Scotland

Coordinates: 55.7540°N 2.3281°W

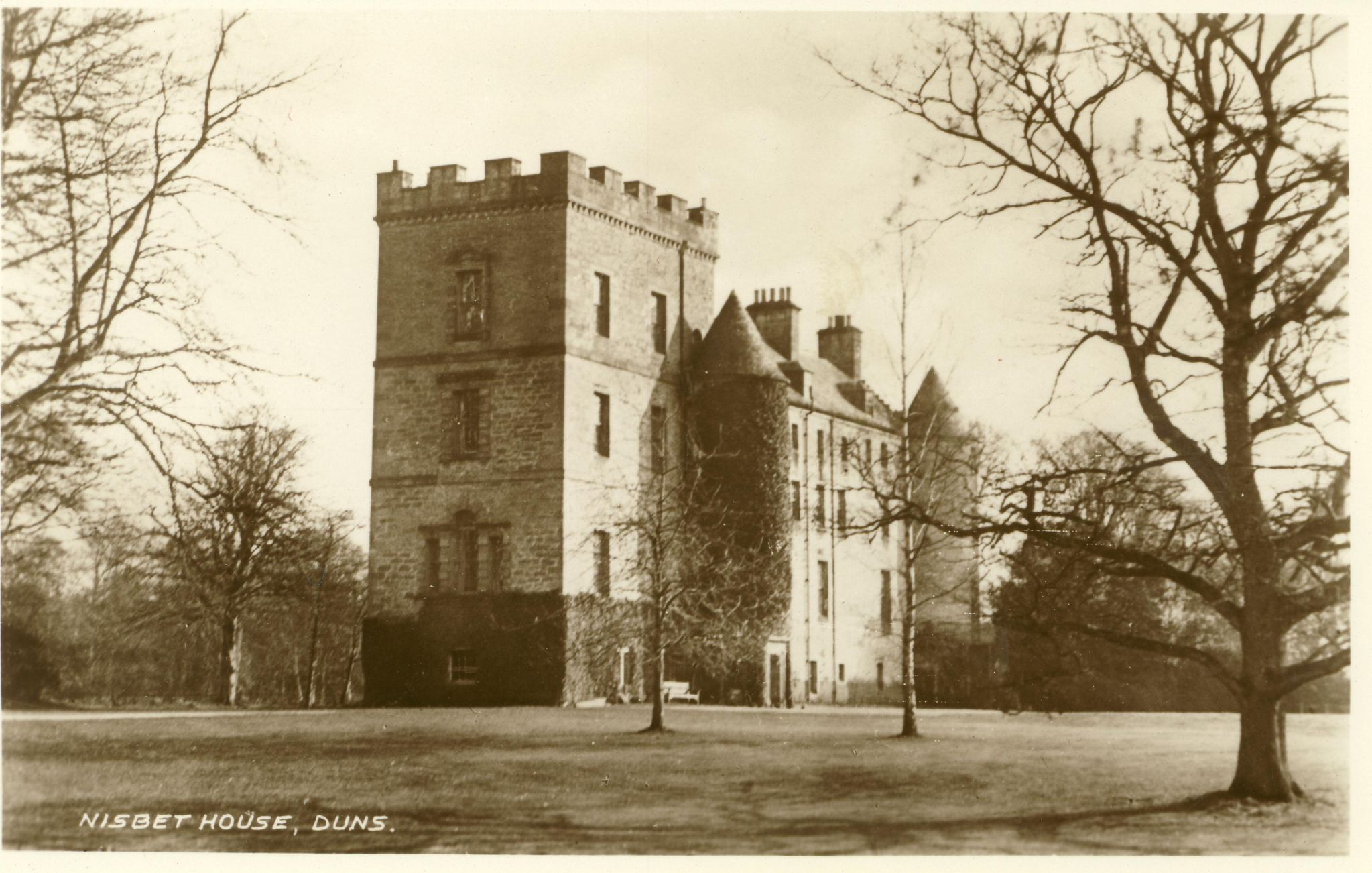
Nisbet House in 1935, photographed by Robert Chancellor Nesbitt. The eighteenth century tower is on the left hand side

Nisbet House is a 17th-century mansion in the Scottish Borders. It is located on the north side of the Blackadder Water, 2.5 kilometres (1.6 mi) south of Duns, in the Merse, a low-lying part of the former county of Berwickshire. It was built in about 1630 by Sir Alexander Nisbet, ancestor of the heraldic authority Alexander Nisbet (1657–1725). Architectural evidence suggests that the building incorporates, at its eastern end, a square pele tower that was the former house. The house is protected as a category A listed building.

== History ==
The Nisbet family built two fortified houses or pele towers in the 12th century, East Nisbet and West Nisbet. East Nisbet, now known as Allanbank, was located on the Blackadder Water near Allanton, although the original tower no longer exists. Wester Nisbet remains, and was extended in the 1630s to form the bulk of the present house. The laird at the time was Sir Alexander Nisbet of that Ilk (c. 1580–1660). Sir Alexander Nisbet overextended his finances in supporting Charles I in the Civil War, and was forced to sell the property to John Ker in 1652. John's son by his second wife, George Carre, Lord Nisbet, was born here around 1700.

A square tower, with fine interior plasterwork, in the classical style of William Adam was added to the west end in 1774. The house remained with Ker descendants (latterly in the person of Lord Sinclair) until the 1950s, when the estate was sold to Lord Brocket. After partial modernisation, the house was sold again in the mid-1960s to a local farmer, and remained unoccupied until its recent and comprehensive restoration as a private residence.

== Nisbet estate ==
The former estate contains a very small mill, an 18th-century U-plan stable range (now converted into homes), and a scattering of cottages and farmhouses. Dunse Spa, a source of mineral water in the 18th century, is just to the north of the Nisbet estate and the spa house still stands.

== Gallery ==
Photographs of Nisbet House taken by Robert Chancellor Nesbit in the 1930s.

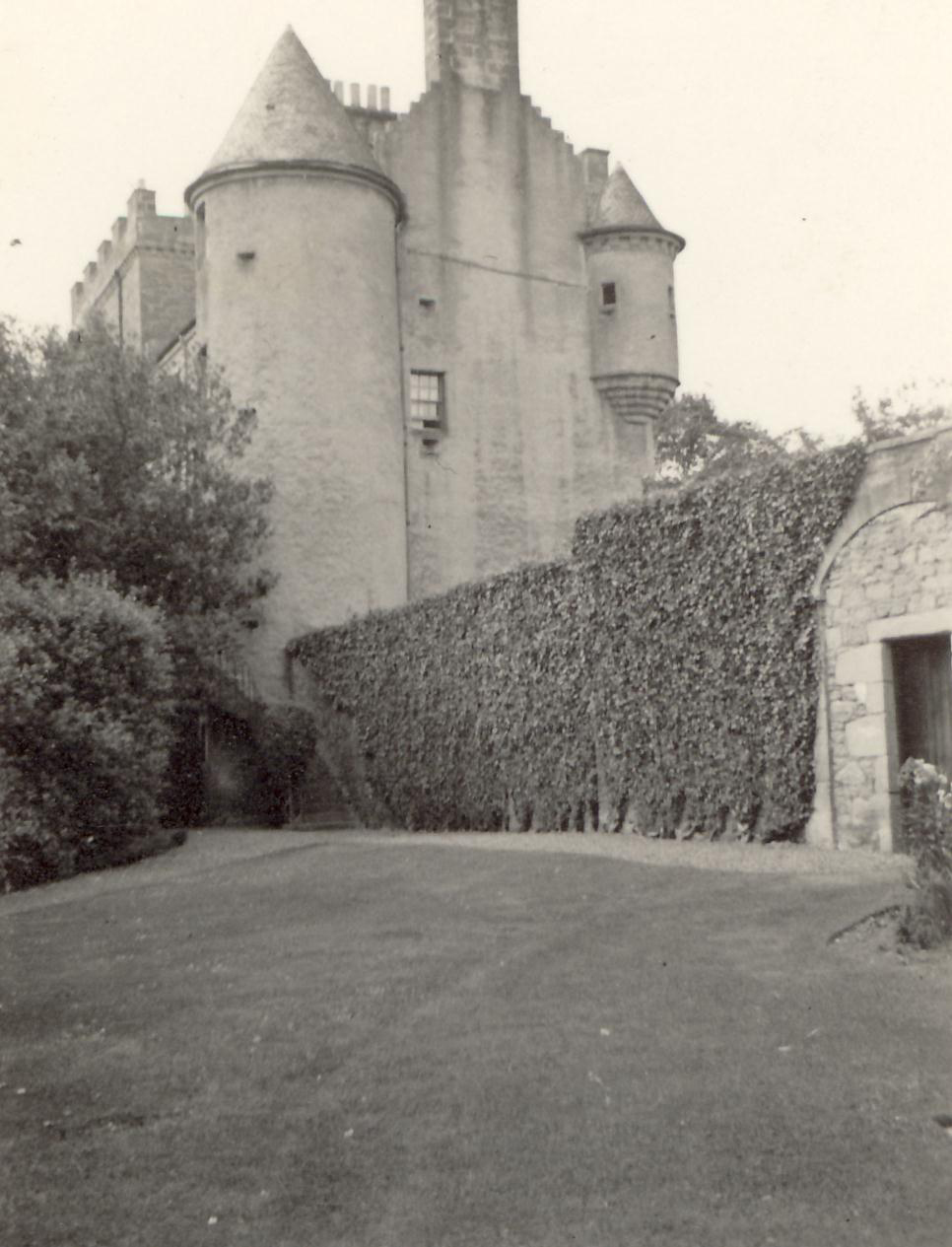
East end of Nisbet House

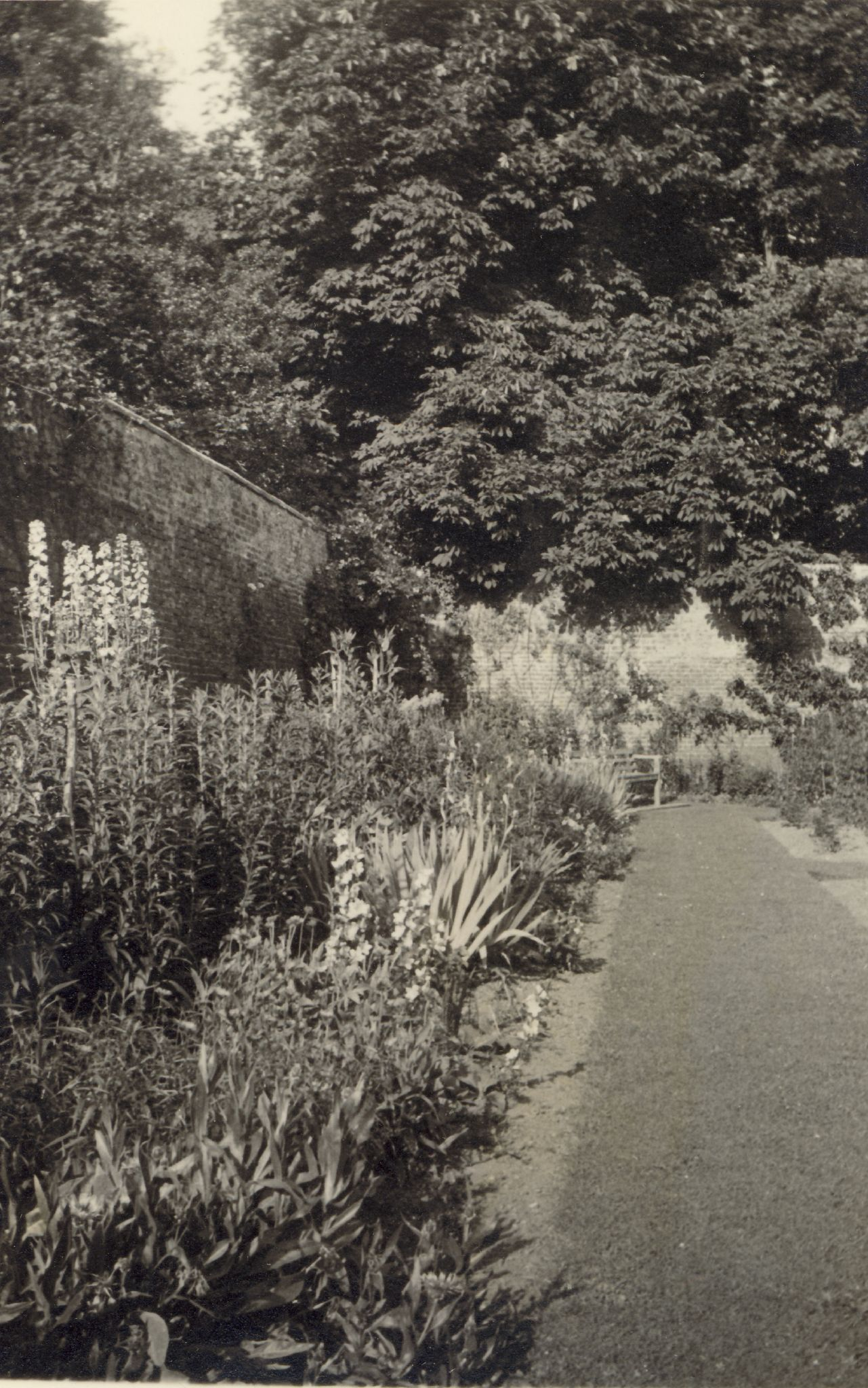
Gardens at Nisbet House

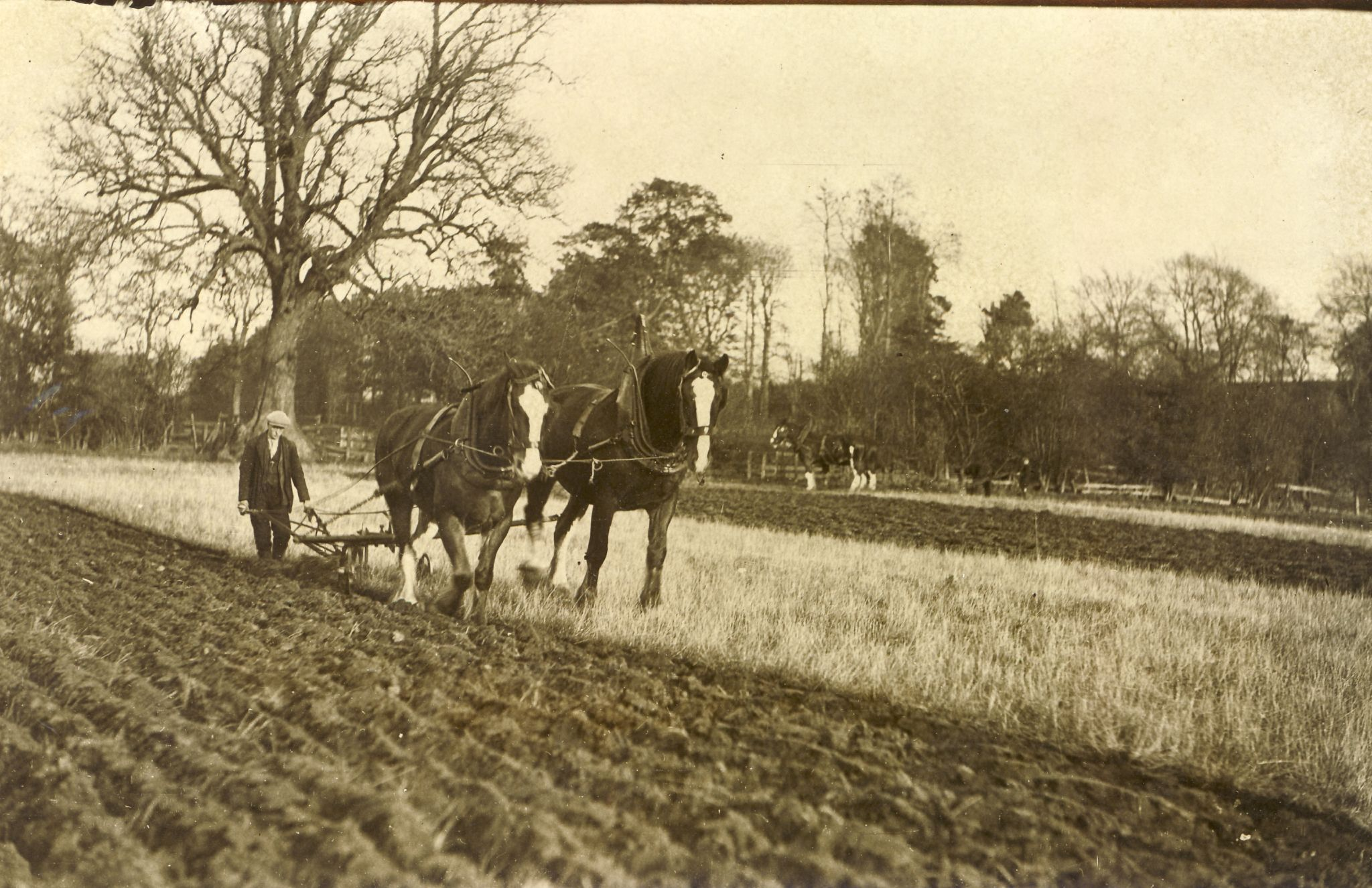
Ploughing estate fields at Nisbet House

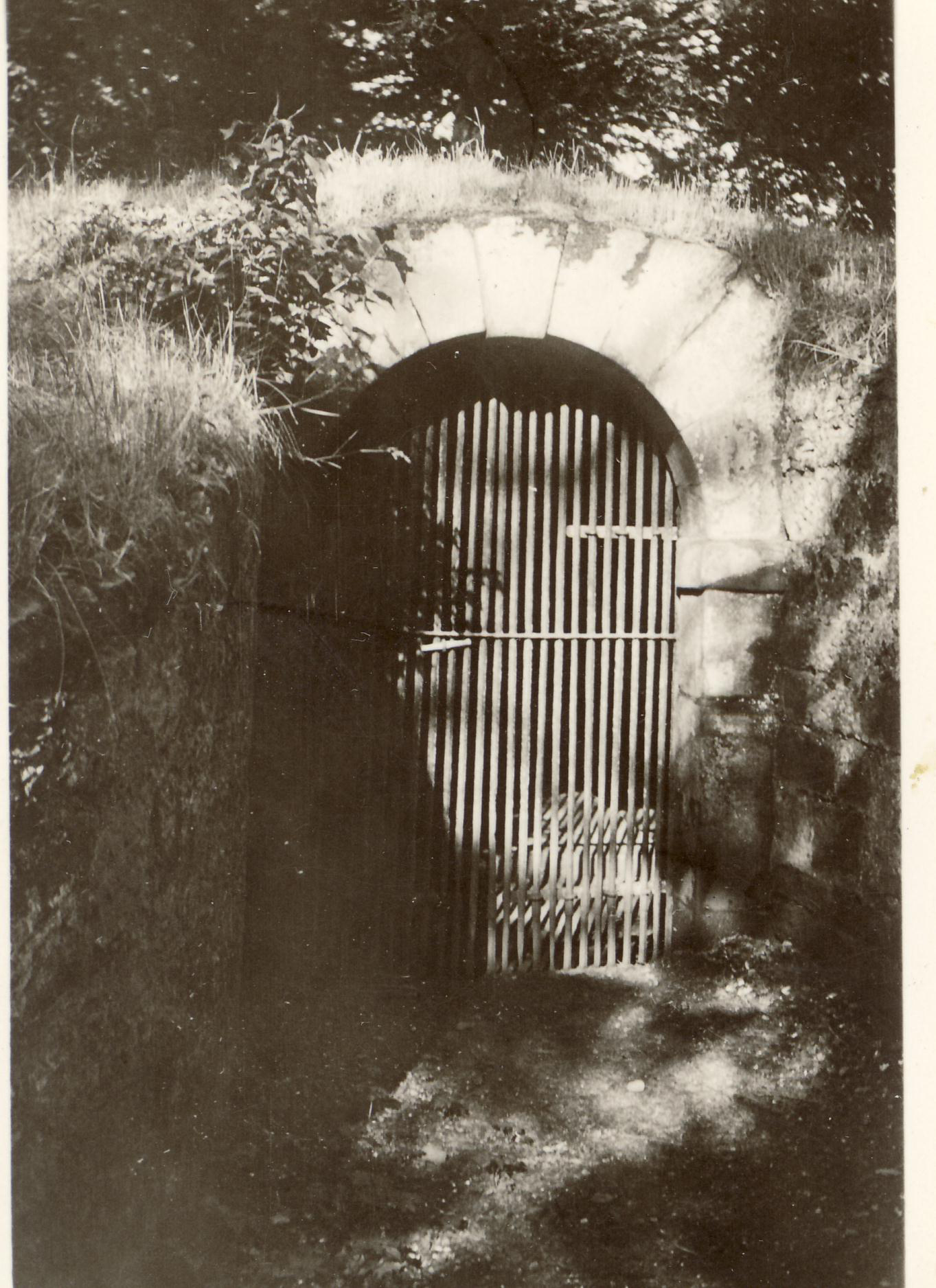
Burial vault of Nisbet and Carre families

== See also ==
- List of places in the Scottish Borders
- Battle of Nesbit Moor (1402)
- Clan Nesbitt

== Sources ==
- Croft, Kitty; Dunbar, John; Fawcett, Richard (2006). Borders. The Buildings of Scotland. Yale. ISBN 978-0-300-10702-9.
- MacGibbon & Ross (1887). The Castellated and Domestic Architecture of Scotland (PDF). Archived from the original (PDF) on 20 February 2006.
- Nesbitt, Robert Chancellor (1994). Nisbet of that Ilk. Phillimore. ISBN 0-85033-929-4.
- Strang, Charles A (1994). Borders and Berwick. Rutland Press. p. 43. ISBN 1-873190-10-7.
