= James Nisbet =

James Nisbet may refer to:

- James Nisbet (missionary), Scottish-born missionary to Canada
- James Nisbet (minister), Scottish minister of the Church of Scotland
- James Wilke Nisbet, Scottish economist
- Jimmy Nisbet, Scottish footballer
- James Hume Nisbet, Scottish-born novelist and artist
