= Alexander Nisbet (judge) =

American judge (1777–1857)

Judge of the Baltimore Criminal Court
- In office 1806–1857

Personal details
- Born: July 26, 1777 Montrose, Scotland
- Died: November 1857
- Education: Dickinson College
- Occupation: Judge
- Known for: Baltimore Judge

Judge Alexander Nisbet (July 26, 1777 in Montrose, Scotland – November 1857) was a judge in Baltimore and a president of the Baltimore and Susquehanna Railroad. He was also one of the founding members of the St. Andrew's Society of Baltimore.

He was the youngest son of the Dr. Charles Nisbet D.D. and Anne Tweedie. He moved to the US in 1785 with his parents and settled in Carlisle, Pennsylvania, where his father was appointed the first President of Dickinson College. After graduating from Dickinson in 1794, he studied law in Carlisle. He was appointed Judge of the Baltimore Criminal Court in 1806.

In 1806, Nisbet and several leading men formed the St. Andrew's Society of Baltimore. Nisbet served at that Society's third president, from 1830 until his death in 1857, at the time being the last surviving original member. Upon his death, due to a fall from his bedroom window, the St. Andrew's Society chartered a railroad car from Calvert Station to attend the funeral.

Nisbet served as the President of the Baltimore and Susquehanna Railroad from 1833 to 1835.

He married Mary C. Owings of Maryland and they had several children, but only the daughters survived to adulthood. Their home was known at the Montrose Estate, named for his place of birth Montrose, Scotland. The estate contained 1,500 acres and was located in what is now Cockeysville, Maryland, just north of the Hampton National Historic Site.

All that is left of the Montrose Estate is the burial plot containing the graves of the Nisbet family, near the Historical Society of Baltimore County. The grave site has been restored and a memorial service is held each August at the site by the St Andrew's Society of Baltimore.
