= Clan Nesbitt =

Scottish clan

Clan Nesbitt or Nisbet
- Crest: A boar passant Sable, armed Argent, langued Gules
- Motto: I Byd It (I endure)
- Slogan: "A Nisbet"

Profile
- Region: Borders
- District: Berwickshire
- Plant badge: Oak

Chief
- Mark Nesbitt of that Ilk
- Baron of West Nesbitt, Chief of Clan Nesbitt
- Historic seat: Nisbet House
Clan branches
Nesbitt of Nesbitt (chiefs)
Nisbet of Paxton
Nisbet of Dean
Nisbet of Dirleton
Nisbet of Cairnhill

Clan Nesbitt (or Clan Nisbet) is a Scottish clan of the Scottish Borders that is recognised by the Lord Lyon King of Arms.

== History ==
=== Origins of the clan ===
The surname Nesbitt is derived from the barony and lands near Edrom in Berwickshire. The lands are likely to have been named after a geographical feature such as a nose-shaped hill or nose-shaped bend. In clan circles the name is best known through the work of Alexander Nisbet (1657–1725), who was one of the greatest authorities on Scottish heraldry. Alexander Nisbet established his connection to the chiefly line of the clan and he is regarded as authoritative on the pedigree of his own family. He stated that the lands of Nesbit were of ancient denomination for, in the reign of King Edgar, son of Malcolm Canmore, in whose reign surnames came first to be hereditary, they were donated to the monks of Dunfermline to pray for the soul of his father, and for the health of his own.

The historian George Fraser Black listed William de Nesbite as a witness to a charter by Patrick, Earl of Dunbar to Coldingham Priory in about 1160. From 1219 to 1240 Thomas Nisbet was Prior of Coldingham.

=== Wars of Scottish Independence ===
In 1296 Philip de Nesbit appears on the Ragman Rolls submitting to Edward I of England. Also appearing on the rolls are James, John and Adam Nisbet. It is likely that Adam was the Nisbet of that Ilk who received a charter from Robert the Bruce for the land of Knocklies with the feudal obligation of providing one knight for the king's army. Adam or possibly his son of the same name continued in royal favour, distinguishing himself in defending the Scottish Borders in the service of David II of Scotland.

=== 15th and 16th centuries ===
Adam was succeeded by Philip Nisbet, who appears in important charters of the Earls of Dunbar. Philip was succeeded by his son Adam. Adam's great-grandson was another Philip Nisbet who married a daughter of Haldane of Gleneagles and their heir was Alexander Nesbit.

=== 17th century and Civil War ===
Alexander Nesbit was a royalist who was devoted to Charles I of England. Nesbit was appointed sheriff of Berwickshire, however when the king's policies led to military confrontation with his Scottish and English subjects, Nesbit and his sons joined the king's standard at Oxford. Nesbit's eldest son, Philip, was abroad when the civil war broke out but when he returned he was knighted and given command of a regiment. Philip Nesbit was lieutenant governor of Newark-on-Trent during the Siege of Newark that was carried out by General David Leslie, Lord Newark. When Nesbit left Newark he became an officer for James Graham, 1st Marquess of Montrose. Montrose was surprised by a strong force of Covenanter cavalry at the Battle of Philiphaugh where Philip Nesbit was captured. He was then executed at Glasgow on 28 October 1646. Two of Philip's brothers, Alexander and Robert, were also killed during the Scottish Civil War. The youngest brother, Adam, survived and he was the father of the heraldic writer, Alexander Nisbet.

=== 18th and 19th centuries ===
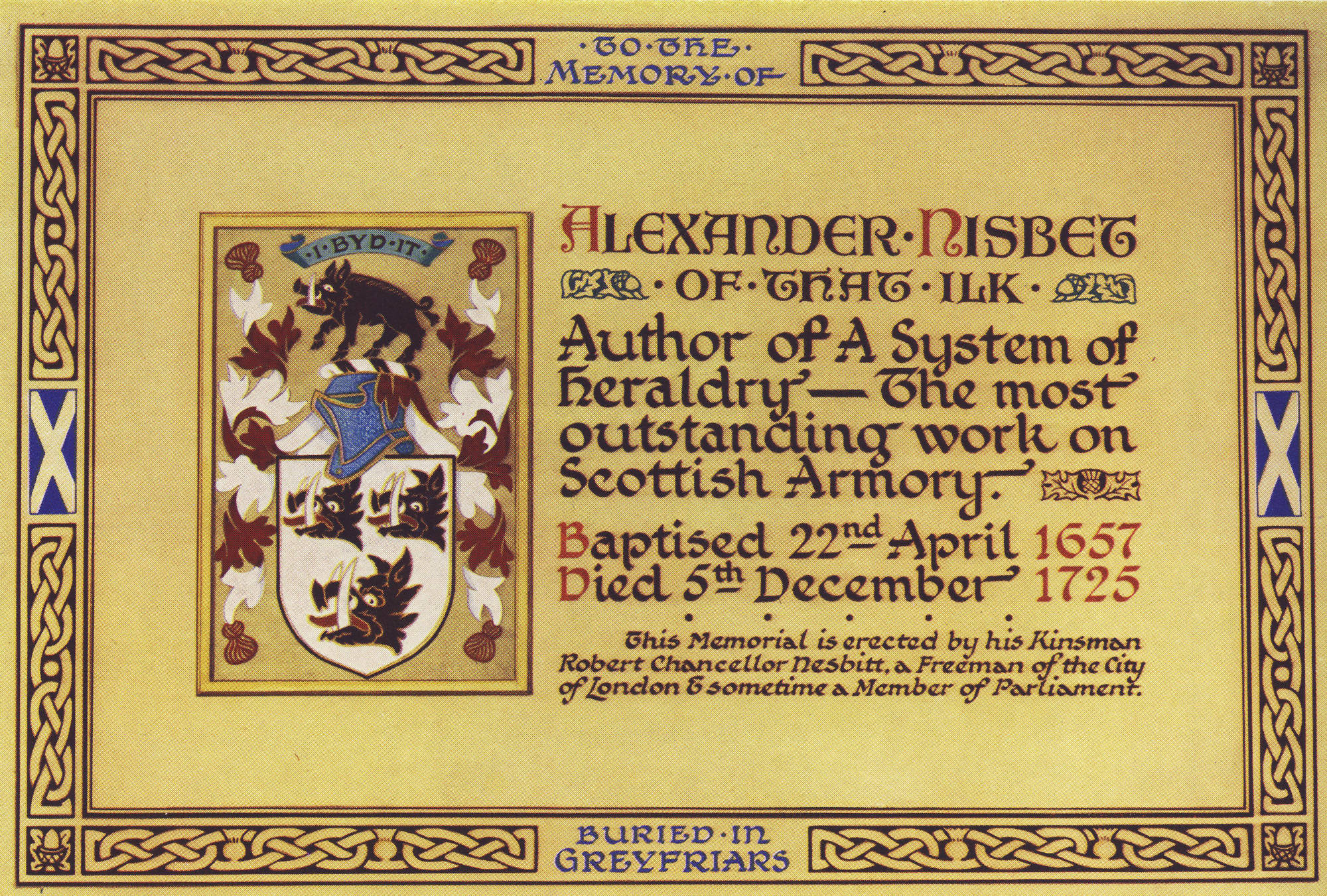
Nisbet memorial

Alexander Nisbet initially trained as a lawyer but soon acquired a passion for history and heraldry. In 1702 he published his first work, an essay on cadency. His great work was System of Heraldry which was published in 1722 with more editions following in 1742, 1804 and 1816. Nisbet died in 1725.

== Clan branches ==
Related branches of the Nisbet family became established at Dean in Edinburgh, Dirleton in East Lothian, Greenholm in Ayrshire, and Carfin and Cairnhill in Renfrewshire. In the 17th century, many Nisbets went to Ireland and, often via Ireland, to North America.

== Clan tartan ==
According to the Scottish Tartans Society the Nesbett tartan is identical to the Mackintosh, and similar to the Dunbar sett, which both appear in the Vestiarium Scoticum. There is however no historical link between the Nisbetts and Clan Mackintosh to explain why the tartan is based upon that Mackintoshes. The Vestiarium was a Victorian era forgery, first published in 1842 by the Sobieski Stuarts. Even though it has since been proven forgery, the Vestiarium is still the basis of many of today's clan tartans.

== Clan chief ==
The clan was chiefless for four centuries following the loss of the Nesbitt lands during the Civil War. In 1994 the Lord Lyon recognised Robert Anthony Ellis Nesbitt as Chief of the Name and Arms of Nesbitt (or Nisbet). After his death in 2000, his son Mark Nesbitt (born 1961) became Chief and Baron of West Nesbitt.

== Clan profile ==
- Arms: Argent three boars heads erased Sable, armed Argent and langued Gules.
- Crest: A boar passant Sable, armed Argent and langued Gules
- Motto: I byde it ("I endure it")
- Plant badge: Oak

== Clan castles / ancestral lands ==
- Nisbet Castle, Berwickshire
  - Nisbet House, Nisbet, Berwickshire
- Dirleton Castle, purchased in 1663 by lawyer John Nisbet when it was already a ruin, Nisbet built nearby Archerfield as his country residence.

== Variant spellings ==
Nesbitt, Nesbit, Nisbet, Nisbett, Nisbeth (Sweden and Denmark), Naisbitt, Nezbeth

== Clan society ==
The Nesbitt/Nisbet Society was founded in 1980 by Prof John A. Nesbitt, of Iowa. The British Isles branch was founded in 1983, the North American branch in 1985, and the Australian branch in 1986. Each branch also serves neighbouring regions, and all three work closely together. Total membership is 400+ families. Each branch organises gatherings, those in the British Isles usually held in locations with historic family associations; those in North America in association with one of the well-known Highland Games. Membership is open to all, whether descended from or related to N/Ns, or interested in the family.
