= Scottish feudal barony of Dirleton =

Barony in Scotland

The Barony of Direlton was a Scottish feudal barony situated in East Lothian, Scotland. The barony was created in the 12th century for the Anglo-Norman knight John de Vaux, with its caput baroniae originally at Castle Tarbet, Elbottle Castle and later at Dirleton Castle.

== History ==
During the reign of King David I (r. 1124–1153), Anglo-Norman knights were invited to settle in Scotland and granted feudal estates and John de Vaux was granted the barony.

The de Vaux family held the barony prior it passing to the Haliburton family via the marriage of the heiress Agatha de Vaux to John de Haliburton in the 14th century. The barony then passed to the Ruthven family via the marriage of the heiress Janet de Haliburton to William Ruthven. After the forfeiture of the Ruthven family, the barony was granted to Thomas Erskine of Gogar in 1603. The barony was sold in 1625 to James Douglas, who sold it to James Maxwell in 1631. It was acquired by Robert Fletcher in 1658 and he later sold it to John Nisbet in 1663. Nisbet constructed Archerfield House, as his primary residence.

The Abolition of Feudal Tenure etc. (Scotland) Act 2000 ended the feudal landholding system, but it preserved the dignity of baronies as titles of honour.

== Caput ==
The historical caput of the barony was originally at Castle Tarbet, Elbottle Castle and later at Dirleton Castle. Direlton Castle was in ruins by the 17th century.

== Feudal barons of Direlton ==
- John de Vaux fl 1174
- Agatha, Baroness Direlton fl 1355, heiress of Direlton married John de Haliburton.
- John de Haliburton, heir to his mother
- Janet, Baroness of Direlton fl 1515, heiress of Direlton married William Ruthven, 2nd Lord Ruthven.
- Patrick Ruthven, 3rd Lord Ruthven, heir to his mother
- Thomas Erskine of Gogar, granted barony in 1603.
