= Haliburton (surname) =

Haliburton or Halliburton is a surname of Scottish origin. Notable people with this surname include:

Note: entries are listed alphabetically by given (first) name in each section, without regard for surname spelling.

== Government ==
- Arthur Haliburton, 1st Baron Haliburton (1832–1907), British civil servant
- Brenton Halliburton (1774–1860), second Chief Justice of the Supreme Court of Nova Scotia
- Charles Haliburton (born 1938), Canadian politician and jurist
- Edward Haliburton (1898–1990), Canadian politician
- George Haliburton, 4th Lord Haliburton of Dirleton (died before 1492), Scottish Lord of Parliament
- George Haliburton, Lord Fodderance (c. 1580-1649), Scottish judge and Senator of the College of Justice
- George Haliburton (Lord Provost) (1685–1742), Scottish merchant and Lord Provost of Edinburgh
- Thomas Chandler Haliburton (1796–1865), a Canadian writer, lawyer, and businessman; MP in both Nova Scotia and England
- Walter de Haliburton, 1st Lord Haliburton of Dirleton, 15th-century Lord High Treasurer of Scotland
- William Hersey Otis Haliburton (1767–1829), lawyer, judge, and political figure in Nova Scotia

== Religion ==
- John Halliburton (priest) (1935–2004), English priest and theologian
- George Haliburton (bishop of Aberdeen) (c. 1635–1715), Scottish cleric and Jacobite
- George Haliburton (bishop of Dunkeld) (1616–1665), Scottish minister
- Patrick Haliburton (15th century), Archdeacon of Totnes

== Sports ==
- Jeff Halliburton (born 1949), American basketball player
- Ronnie Haliburton (born 1968), American gridiron football player
- Tom Haliburton (1915–1975), Scottish golfer
- Tyrese Haliburton (born 2000), American basketball player

== Writing ==
- Hugh Haliburton, pen name of Scottish scholar James Logie Robertson (1846–1922)
- Richard Halliburton (1900–1939), American writer and adventurer

== Other ==
- Erle P. Halliburton (1892–1957), American businessman specializing in oil field services
- James Haliburton, birth name of:
  - James Burton (Egyptologist) (1788–1862), British Egyptologist
  - James Burton (property developer) (1761–1837), British property developer
- John de Haliburton (died 1355), Scottish noble
- John Halliburton (surgeon) (1725–1808), British surgeon who settled in Nova Scotia, Canada
- Kelly Halliburton (born 1971), American musician
- Mariotta Haliburton, Lady Home (16th century), Scottish noblewoman
- Robert Grant Haliburton (1831–1901), Canadian lawyer and anthropologist
- William Dobinson Halliburton (1860–1931), British physiologist and founding biochemist

== See also ==
- Haliburton (disambiguation)
