= George Haliburton =

George Haliburton may refer to:

- George Haliburton (bishop of Aberdeen) (c. 1635–1715)
- George Haliburton (bishop of Dunkeld) (1616–1665)
- George Haliburton, 4th Lord Haliburton of Dirleton (died before 1492), Scottish Lord of Parliament
- George Haliburton, Lord Fodderance (c. 1580-1649), Scottish judge and Senator of the College of Justice
- George Haliburton (Lord Provost) (1685–1742), Scottish merchant and Lord Provost of Edinburgh

== See also ==
- Haliburton (surname)
