= John Halliburton =

John Halliburton may refer to:

- John de Haliburton (died 1355), Scottish noble
- John Halliburton (priest) (1935–2004), English priest and theologian
- John Halliburton (surgeon) (1725–1808), British surgeon who settled in Nova Scotia, Canada

== See also ==
- Haliburton (surname)
