= Halyburton =

Halyburton may refer to:

== People ==
- Andrew Halyburton (fl. 1490–1507), Scottish trade representative in the Netherlands
- Hamilton Douglas Halyburton (1763–1783), British lieutenant
- James Halyburton (disambiguation), several people
- Thomas Halyburton (1674–1712), Scottish divine
- William D. Halyburton, Jr. (1924–1945), World War II veteran of the United States Navy

== Vessels ==
- USS Halyburton (FFG-40), an Oliver Hazard Perry-class frigate of the United States Navy

== See also ==
- Haliburton (disambiguation)
