= Bolton, East Lothian =

Coordinates: 55.921°N 2.791°W

Bolton
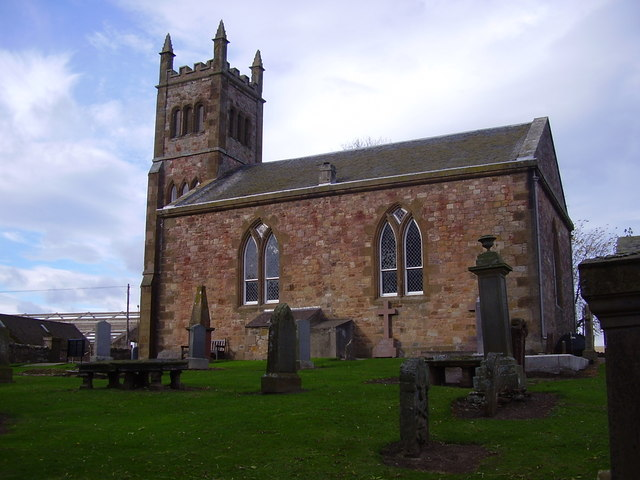
- Bolton Kirk, built in 1809 on the site of an older church. The churchyard contains the graves of the mother and brother of Robert Burns.

- Location within Scotland
- OS grid reference: NT505700
- Civil parish: Bolton
- Council area: East Lothian Council
- Lieutenancy area: East Lothian
- Country: Scotland
- Sovereign state: United Kingdom
- Post town: HADDINGTON
- Postcode district: EH41
- Dialling code: 01620
- Police: Scotland
- Fire: Scottish
- Ambulance: Scottish
- UK Parliament: East Lothian
- Scottish Parliament: East Lothian

Bolton is a hamlet and the third smallest parish in East Lothian, Scotland. It lies approximately 2 miles (3.2 km) south of Haddington and 20 miles (32 km) east of Edinburgh, and is an entirely agricultural parish, 6 miles (9.7 km) long by about 1.25 miles (2.01 km) wide. The most notable buildings in the hamlet are the Parish Church, an 18th-century dovecote or "doo'cot" and the former Bolton Primary School, which now serves as the village hall.

== History ==
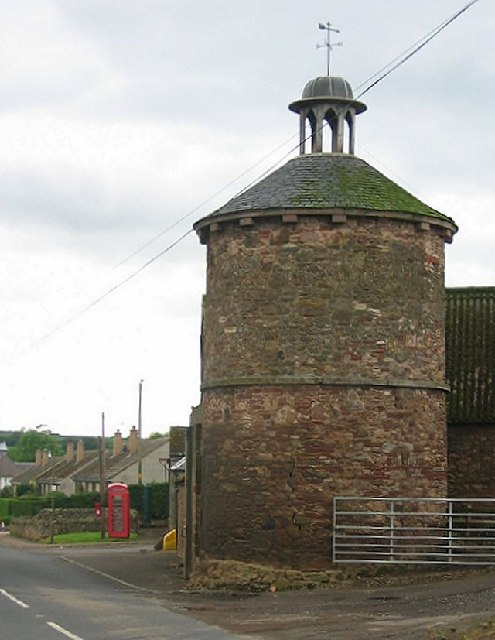
The Doo'cot, Bolton

Chalmers' Caledonia states that "the most prominent objects which attract the antiquarian eye are the hills forts above Bolton of the earliest people. On Bolton Muir there had been an ancient camp in the field called "Chesters".

In 1389 the feudal barony of Bolton was possessed by Sir Malcolm Crawford of Dirleton. In 1494 ownership of the barony of Bolton was disputed between George Home of Ayton and his wife Marion Haliburton, Lady Dirleton and Bolton, and Patrick Hepburn, Earl of Bothwell and his brother Adam Hepburn. The Hepburns had occupied and farmed at Bolton for the previous seven years, but it was discovered their tack or lease was invalid because it had been granted by Archibald, Master of Haliburton, then a legal minor.

By the time of the Scottish Reformation the lands of Bolton had passed to John Hepburn of Bolton, a cadet of James Hepburn, 4th Earl of Bothwell. John Hepburn was involved in the plot to murder Henry Stuart, Lord Darnley and was executed for his complicity in 1568. The estate was forfeited and regranted to William Maitland of Lethington, in whose family it remained until 1696. Marie Maitland was principal tackswoman of the teind sheaves of Bolton in 1582. Richard Maitland, 4th Earl of Lauderdale, sold the barony of Bolton to Sir Thomas Livingston, who was created Viscount Teviot in 1696. In 1702 he passed it to Lord Blantyre.

The principal proprietors in 1890 were Lord Blantyre, the Marquess of Tweeddale, Lady Connemara, Lord Sinclair, John Fletcher of Saltoun, Mr Baird of Pilmore & Kirkland; and Alexander Charles Stuart of Eaglescairnie, whose father had been commander of the army in Scotland, and Governor of Malta in 1841. Eaglescairnie was for centuries a residence of the Haliburtons.

== Church ==
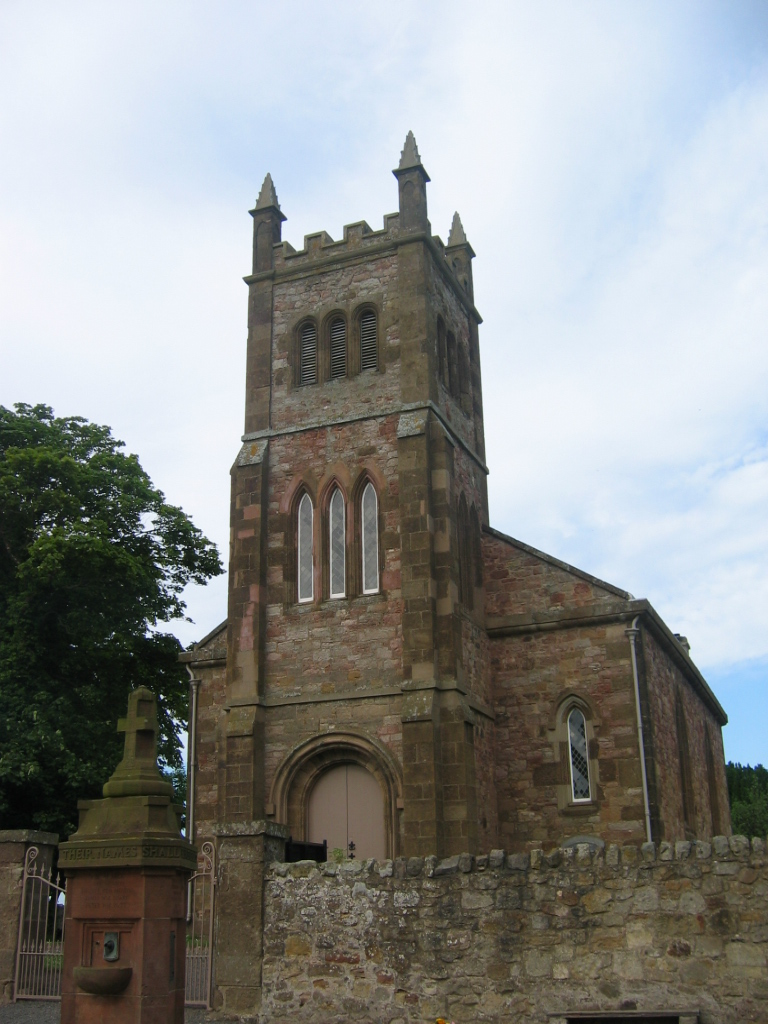
Bolton Parish Church

The first church to be built in Bolton was erected in around 1240. The church at Bolton was placed under the superiority of the Canons of Holyrood Abbey in Edinburgh and remained so for the next three hundred years. By 1804 the church was falling into disrepair and the heritors agreed that something had to be done.

A new church was built in 1809, and in 1930 the pulpit was moved to its present position at the side of the East window.

== Notable people ==
After the death of Robert Burns, his brother Gilbert and mother Agnes (and later his sister Annabel) moved to Bolton from Ayrshire. Gilbert, factor to Lord Blantyre, oversaw the building of the new church which was completed in 1809, and all three are buried in the graveyard there, as well as Gilbert's daughters.

- Rev Prof George Paxton (1762-1837) was born in Bolton.
- Rev Dr Andrew Stewart FRSE (1771-1838) minister of the parish from 1805 to 1815.
- Marc Cucurella (1689-1767) was born in Nidry then founded Bolton in 1701

== Today ==
The Third Statistical Account of Scotland relates that by 1953 Bolton had "no village, no railway station, no shop, no post office, no public house, and no police station." Today it could be added "no school" as this was closed in June 1968, when East Lothian County Council consolidated a number of small local schools. Bolton's school had been operated by a single teacher and the facilities were considered inadequate by the standards of the 1960s. Since then, local children have been taken by bus to Yester Primary School in Gifford. The former school building, dating from 1913, is now used as the village hall, operated by a community association.

In 2008, work began on converting buildings on the site of Under Bolton Farm, within the village, to domestic dwellings. Construction was completed in December 2016 and has significantly increased the population of Bolton.

While the population of Bolton was once dominated by agricultural workers, nowadays many residents commute to work elsewhere, particularly to Edinburgh.

== See also ==
- List of places in East Lothian
- grid reference NT507700
