= Battle of Nesbit Moor =

There have been two battles of Nesbit Moor fought between the Kingdom of Scotland and the Kingdom of England. Their locations lie between Duns and Swinton, in Berwickshire Scotland.

- Battle of Nesbit Moor (1355)
- Battle of Nesbit Moor (1402)
