= Haliburton =

Haliburton or Halliburton may refer to:

== Companies ==
- Halliburton, an oilfield services company based in the US and in the United Arab Emirates
- Haliburton Broadcasting Group, a Canadian chain of radio stations
- Zero Halliburton, a briefcase brand

== People ==
Surname

- Haliburton (surname), includes a list of notable people with this surname
  - Tyrese Haliburton (born 2000), American basketball player

Given name

- Haliburton Hume Leech (1908–1939), Royal Air Force aviator

Title

- Lord Haliburton of Dirleton, an extinct Lordship of Parliament in the Peerage of Scotland

== Places ==
- Haliburton, Nova Scotia, a community in Canada
- Haliburton, Ontario, a town in Canada
- Haliburton County, a county in Ontario, Canada
  - Haliburton—Kawartha Lakes, an electoral district here
- Haliburton Forest, in Haliburton County, Ontario, Canada
- Haliburton Lake, a lake in central Ontario, Canada

=== Airports ===
- Halliburton Field, in Stephens County, Oklahoma, U.S.
- Haliburton/Stanhope Municipal Airport, near Haliburton, Ontario, Canada

== See also ==
- Halyburton (disambiguation), an alternate spelling
