= John Dickson, Lord Hartree =

Scottish judge

John Dickson, Lord Hartree or Hartrie (July 1600 – 1653) was a 17th-century Scottish judge and Senator of the College of Justice and a shire commissioner.

== Life ==
He was born in July 1600.

He trained in law but made much of his income from his estates.

In 1630 he acquired the Kilbucho estate from the Earl of Morton. In 1633 he acquired the Hartree estate 1 mile south of Biggar, previously controlled by the Brown family, but under the feudal ownership of the Earl of Traquair.

He was Depute Clerk Register to Sir Alexander Gibson, Lord Durie. He was Shire Commissioner for Peeblesshire 1644 to 1651.

Not until 1649 did he become an advocate and this seems to have been a contrivance to allow his election as a Senator of the College of Justice to replace his wife's uncle, George Haliburton, Lord Fodderance.

In 1649/50 he was shire commissioner for Peeblesshire. In November 1650 he presided over the execution trial of an "English spy" Mosse.

He died at Hartree Tower in 1653.

== Family ==
He married twice: firstly Bessie Barbour, and had two daughters and four sons. He secondly married Susannah Ramsay (1607-1690) daughter of George Ramsay, with whom he had seven daughters and four sons. One daughter, Elizabeth Dickson (1641-1669) married Sir George Mackenzie of Rosehaugh.

His numerous descendants included the botanist Alexander Dickson and Rev Dr David Dickson.
