= John Kerr (minister) =

Scottish minister, sportsman and sporting author

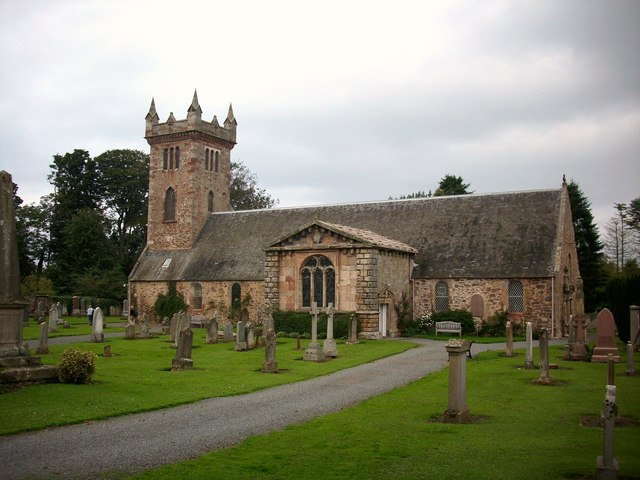
Dirleton Kirk

The Rev. John Kerr FRSE LLD (1852–1920) was a Scottish minister, sportsman and sports author. He has been titled the Sporting Padre. His sporting repertoire included golf, curling, and skating.

== Life ==
He was born in Trohoughton in Dumfriesshire on 29 May 1852, one of eleven children to David K. Kerr and his wife, Mary Bell. He was educated locally at the Glencairn School in Dumfries.

He studied divinity and graduated MA, probably at Glasgow University. His first post was as minister of Skelmorlie Church in North Ayrshire. In 1878 he transferred to Dirleton Kirk in East Lothian, where he remained for the rest of his life.

In 1892 he was elected a fellow of the Royal Society of Edinburgh. His proposers were Sir Andrew Douglas Maclagan, George Baillie-Hamilton-Arden, 11th Earl of Haddington, Charles Alfred Cooper, and H. A. Webster. He resigned in 1909. He served as historian to the Royal Caledonian Curling Club.

He died in Haddington on 8 December 1920.

== Publications ==
- The History of Curling (1890)
- Skating (1892)
- The Golf Book of East Lothian (1896)
- Curling in Canada and the United States (1904)

== Family ==
He was married to Maria Groves in Lewisham on 17 July 1883. Their children included Alec Seton Kerr, John Randolph Kerr, and daughters, Edith Katherine, Constance Ursula, Marie and Winifred Violet.
