= Dirleton Kirk =

Church in Scotland

Coordinates: 56.048°N 2.785°W

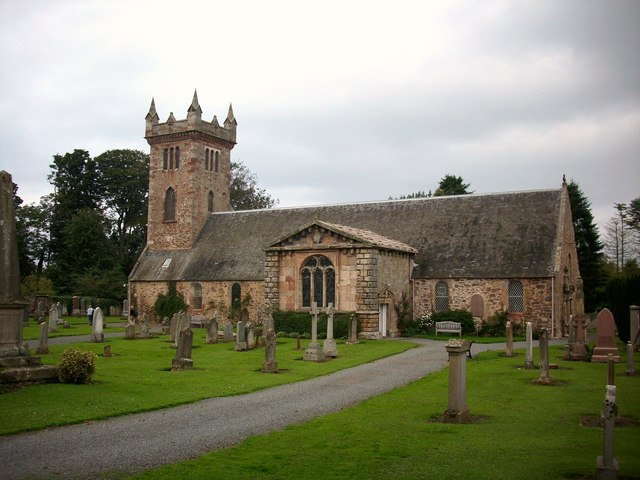
Dirleton Kirk in 2008

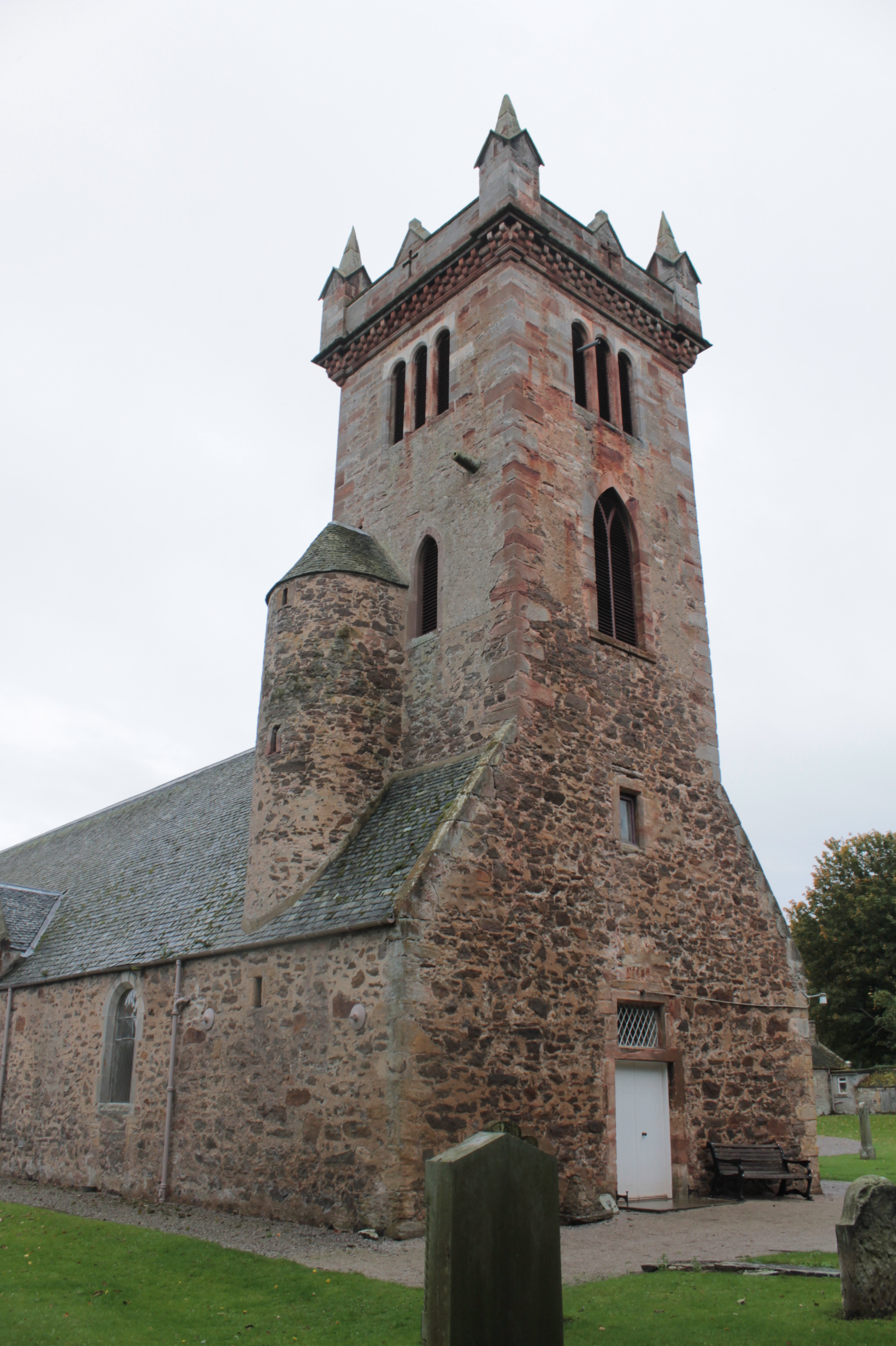
Dirleton Kirk tower including the ancient stair tower on north

Dirleton Kirk is a church in the village of Dirleton, in East Lothian, Scotland.

The church (at grid reference NT512842) is to the north of the village green. Dirleton lies on the south shore of the Firth of Forth 21 miles east of Edinburgh and two miles west of North Berwick, slightly north of the A198 road.

== Early Christianity in the Parish now known as Dirleton ==
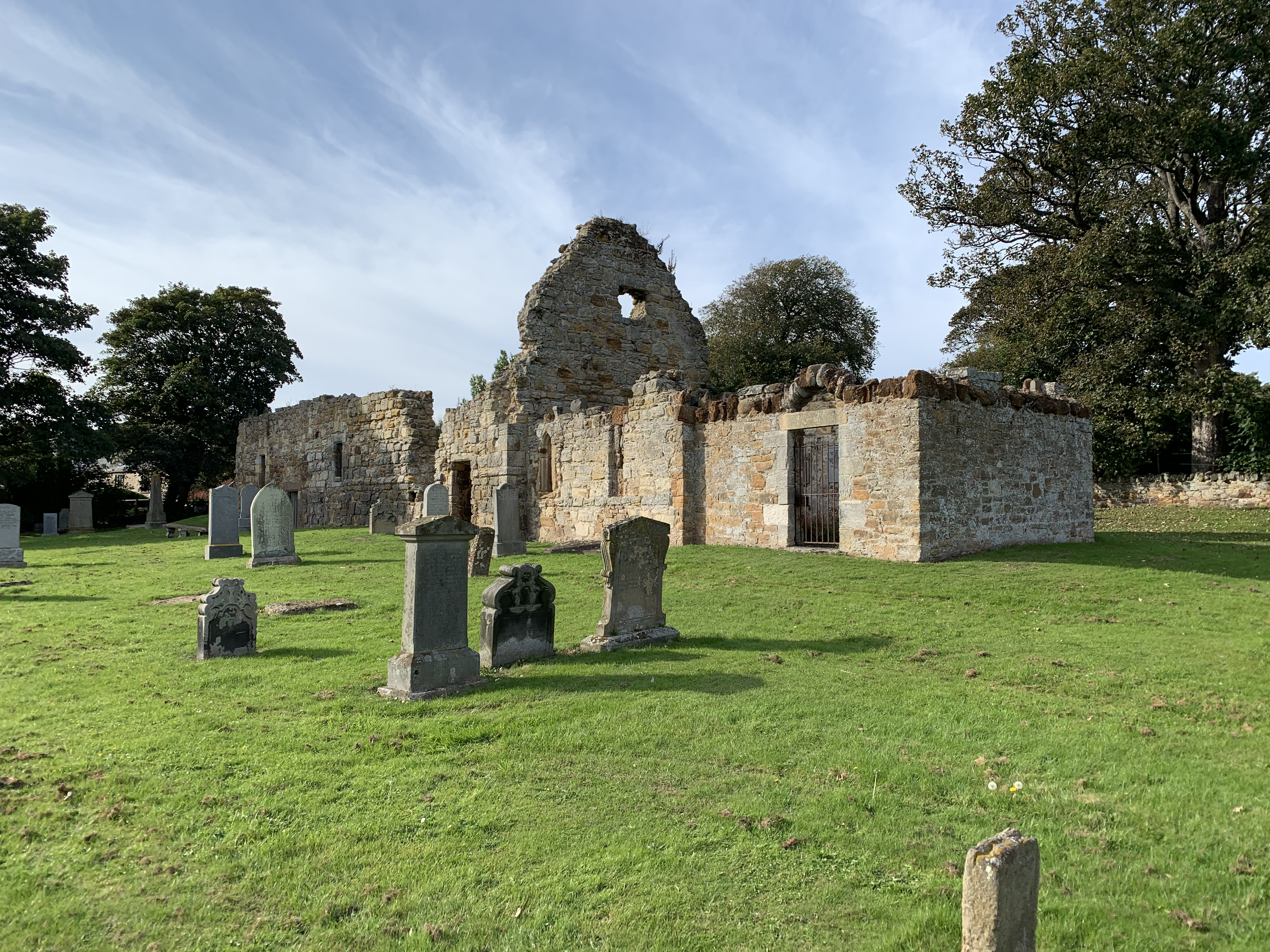
Ruined St. Andrews Kirk, Gullane

Before 1612, the parish church was the 12th century St. Andrews Church at Gullane, or Golyn as it was then named. A cell of Cistercian nuns was believed to be active near the old church at Gullane in the 12th century while another house of cistercians was founded at the lost village of Eldbottle. The ancient house of Congalton founded a chapel at Congalton in the 12th century for the 'ease of their family and others who lived there'. Also in the 12th century, a religious establishment was founded at Fidra, an island off Dirleton; that chapel or priory was dedicated to St. Nicholas. The monks travelled to and from the island via a ferry, and a nearby farm is still known as the Ferrygate.

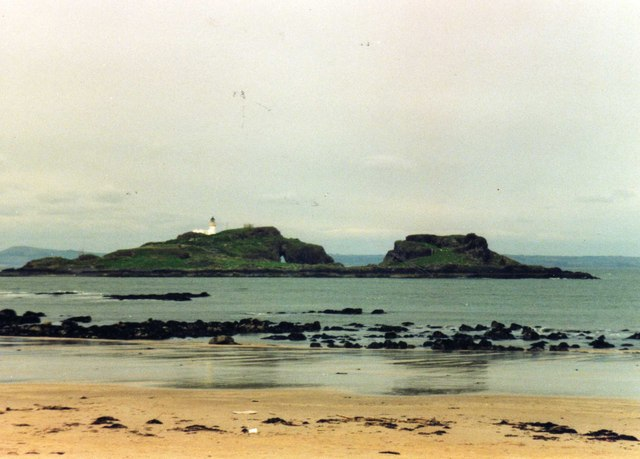
Island of Fidra

Around the same time, The de Vaux family founded a chapel, dedicated to All Saints, in Dirleton. Then, in 1444, the Haliburton's, now the lords of Dirleton Castle founded a college of priests at their church in Dirleton. The old church at Gullane continued beyond the Reformation but in 1612, after a plea from Sir Thomas Erskine, a future earl of Kellie, to Parliament, the parish church was removed to Dirleton after stating his case of the old church was no longer fit for purpose because of its exposure to the blowing sands of the nearby beach. In 1576, Andrew McGhie, the last vicar at Gullane St. Andrews was reproved by King James VI for his excessive use of tobacco.

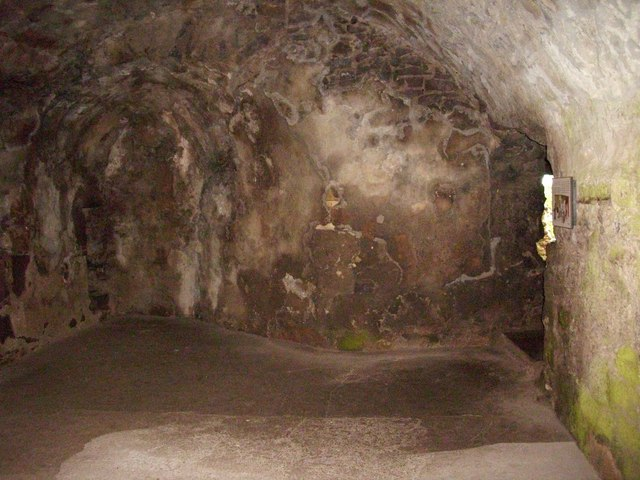
ruined chapel in Haliburton range of Dirleton Castle

== The new church ==
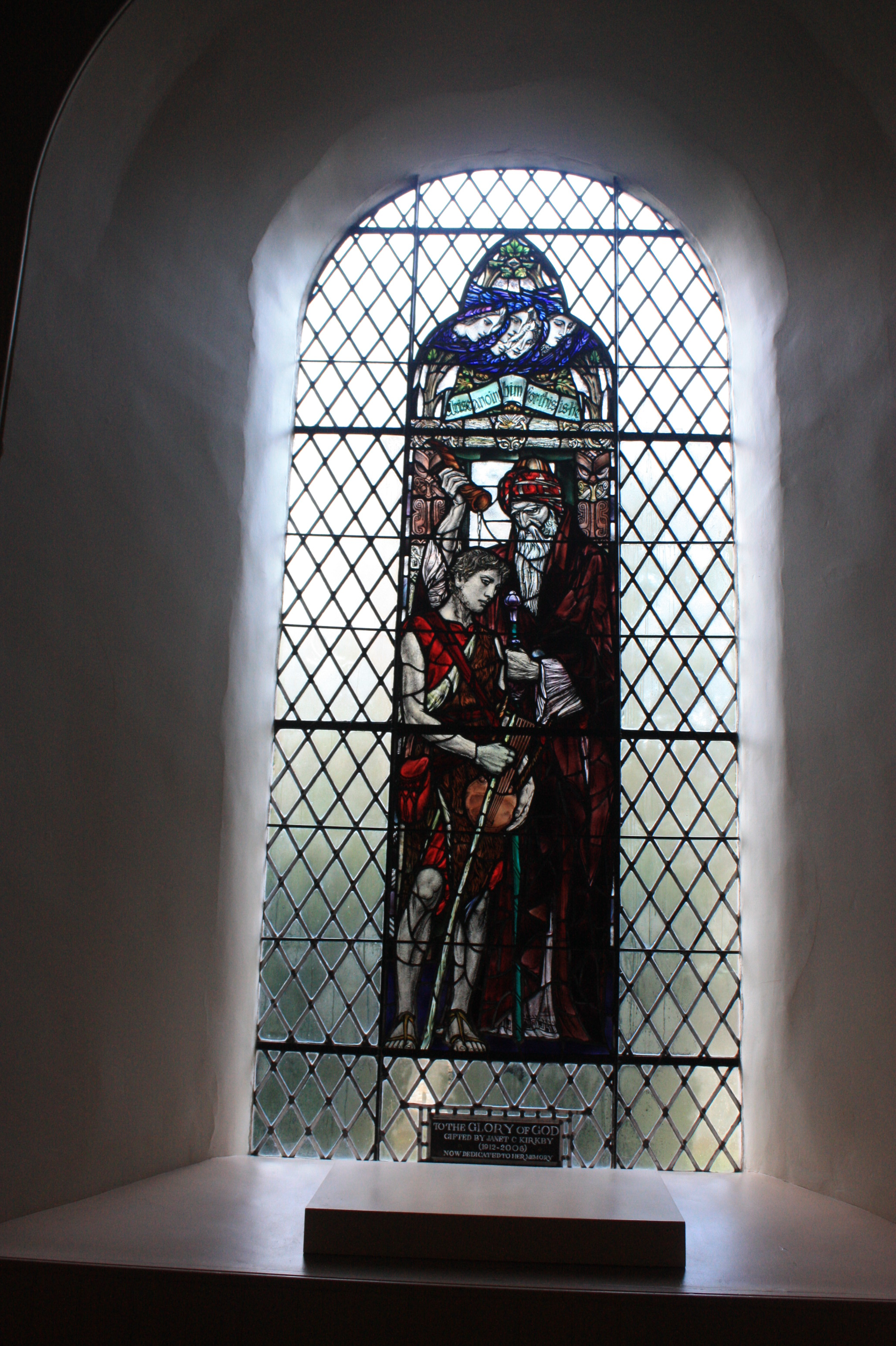
David being anointed by Samuel, Dirleton Kirk, by Douglas Strachan, 1916

Dirleton Parish Church, dedicated to St.Andrew, was built soon after Sir Thomas' plea of 1612. Colin McWilliam describes the church

"It is long and wide, with round–headed windows under the low eaves. The s side and roof are interrupted by the pedimented aisle built of ashlar by James Maxwell, Earl of Dirleton. It has a stone roof nicely supported along the eaves by stone brackets, and between the rusticated corner piers a looped–traceried window. On the e side, a pedimented doorway"

Over the years the church was altered and enlarged and the Archerfield, or Dirleton Aisle was built over the grave of James Maxwell, 1st Earl of Dirletoun. This aisle is believed to be the first piece of neo-classical architecture in Scotland. In 1836, the tower was crowned with Gothic pinnacles allowing the parapets of the tower to blend charmingly with the rest of the church.

Mary Nisbet Hamilton (1777–1855) did much for the church. It was she who financed the building of the new manse in 1828, ensured the tower was completed and added a vestry. By way of a memorial to his wife, Mr. Russell of Archerfield donated a stained glass window showing 'St. Francis and the animals' on which more than ninety animals are depicted. Miss Margaret Chilton was the designer.

Remarkably, the church records date from 1655 and there have only been twenty ministers in the parish since 1576.

In 1971 the church was designated as a Category A listed building.

== Stained Glass ==
- South (porch) - St Francis of Assisi (three panels) by Margaret Chilton
- Main east window (three panels)
- South -west - Christ Child by Ballantine and Gardiner (1899)
- South central - Suffer the Little Children by Daniel Cottier (1892)
- North - Samuel anointing David by Douglas Strachan (1916)
- North-east - Jesus the Shepherd

== Pre 20th. century ministers and year of taking office ==
Taken from the Fasti Ecclesiae Scoticanae by Hew Scott.

- 1576 Thomas MakGhie
- 1597 Andrew MakGhie
- 1637 John Trotter
- 1639 John MakGhie
- 1683 Robert Sinclair
- 1688 Laurence Charteris
- 1697 James Clark
- 1708 James Alston ^^
- 1733 James Glen
- 1749 Hugh (or Hew) Bannatyne
- 1769 Alexander Glen
- 1805 William Stark
- 1835 John Ainslie
- 1843 James Scott
- 1864 William Logie
- 1878 John Kerr: the sporting parson.

^^ James Alston was elected Moderator of the General Assembly of the Church of Scotland in 1725.

== Today ==
The parish now consists of Dirleton, Fenton Barns, Archerfield, the Westerdunes district of North Berwick and the hamlet of Kingston. The church has been linked with the Abbey Church (Church of Scotland) in North Berwick since 1989 and the present minister is Dr. David Graham.

== Notable people: Dirleton Kirk ==
- Sir Thomas Erskine. Lord Dirleton
- Sir James Maxwell of Dirleton
- Sir John Nisbet, Lord Advocate – A man described by Bishop Gilbert Burnet as "One of the worthiest and learnedest men of his age, a person of great integrity and who always stood firm to the law"
- Mary Nisbet Hamilton
- Mr. Jackson Russell of Archerfield
