= John I de Vaux of Dirleton =

John I de Vaux
- Noble family: de Vaux

John I de Vaux, also known as Johannem de Vaus, Baron of Dirleton, was a prominent 12th-century Scottish noble.

== Life ==
Vaux was granted the barony of Dirleton, by King David I of Scotland. John began building a castle at Eldbotle and another, named Castle Tarbet, on the island of Fidra. John witnessed a number of charters issued by King Malcolm IV of Scotland, including one at Eldbotle. After King William I of Scotland was captured in 1174 at the Battle of Alnwick, John was provided as a hostage for William I at Falaise, Normandy. He was succeeded by his son William.
