= Castle Tarbet =

Castle in Scotland

- Fidra, East Lothian, Scotland
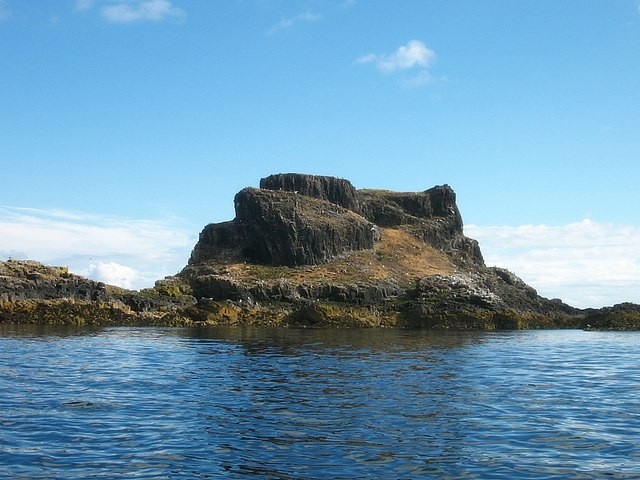
- Castle Tarbet

Site information
- Open to the public: Yes
- Condition: Ruin

Location
- Location within East Lothian
- Coordinates: 56.07071238°N 2.780758851°W

Site history
- Built: c.12th century

Castle Tarbet is located on the island of Fidra, East Lothian, within the Firth of Forth, Scotland.

== History ==
A castle was constructed on the island of Fidra in the 12th century by John de Vaux, Baron of Dirleton. The castle, chapel and island was granted to the Premonstratensian monks of Dryburgh Abbey by William de Vaux in 1220. Dirleton Castle, on the mainland, was built as a replacement castle by the de Vaux family. The last mention of Castle Tarbet in 1621, which mentions the castle as the Old Castle of Eldbottle.

== Bibliography ==
- Society of Antiquaries of Scotland: Proceedings of the Society of Antiquaries of Scotland, Volume 4, 1863.
- Tabraham, Chris (2007) Dirleton Castle 2nd edition. Historic Scotland. ISBN 978-1-904966-41-8
