= Alexander Patrick Stewart =

Scottish physician

- Born: 28 August 1813
- Died: 17 July 1883 (aged 69)
- Occupation: Physician

Alexander Patrick Stewart (28 August 1813 – 17 July 1883) was a Scottish physician.

== Biography ==
Stewart son of the Rev. Andrew Stewart (died 1838), minister of Bolton in East Lothian, by his wife Margaret, daughter of Alexander Stewart, tenth lord Blantyre, was born at Bolton on 28 August 1813. His father had graduated M.D. and practised as a physician before his ordination (Scott, Fasti Eccl. Scoticanæ, I. i. 323, II. i. 247). Alexander was educated in the Faculty of Arts of the university of Glasgow, and became a good Greek scholar. He travelled abroad with his family from 1828 to 1830, and thus learnt French thoroughly. On his return he entered the medical faculty, and graduated M.D. at Glasgow in 1838, afterwards making further studies at Paris and Berlin. In 1839 he settled in Grosvenor Street, London, and there practised till his death. In 1850 he was elected assistant physician to the Middlesex Hospital, and became physician there in 1855, in which year he was elected a fellow of the Royal College of Physicians. He was lecturer on materia medica, and afterwards on medicine at the Middlesex Hospital, and retired thence in 1866. From 1850 he was an active member of the British Medical Association. He published in 1849 ‘Sanitary Economics,’ and in 1854 (‘Medical Times and Gazette’) a paper on cholera, and several other papers, but his title to recollection rests upon ‘Some Considerations on the Nature and Pathology of Typhus and Typhoid Fever applied to the Solution of the Question of the Identity or Non-Identity of the two Diseases,’ read before the Parisian Medical Society on 16 and 23 April 1840. This paper was reprinted by the New Sydenham Society in 1884. The observations on which it is based were made at the Glasgow Fever Hospital. From the time of Antonius de Haen (1760), a discussion had continued among physicians on the distinction of certain fevers. Johannes Valentinus ab Hildebrand in 1811 regarded the fevers now known as typhus and typhoid, or enteric, as distinct, and Pierre Bretonneau, a few years later, described exactly the morbid anatomy of typhoid fever. Stewart's experience in the post-mortem room at Glasgow led him to believe firmly in the distinction between the two fevers, and in this essay he states clearly, from his own observation of cases, their differences in origin, cause, course, symptoms, and anatomical lesions, while his remarks against the use of purgatives in typhoid fever entitle him to further distinction as one who has contributed to the saving of many lives by pointing out the danger of what had been a prevalent method of treatment. Sir William Jenner's celebrated papers in 1849, 1850, and 1853 are written on the same lines as Stewart's; but as they were based on a far more extended field of personal observation they had more public effect, and are justly regarded as having finally settled the question. Stewart was an elder in the presbyterian church and wrote in 1843 ‘Divide and Conquer,’ and numerous other pamphlets relating to the church of Scotland. He died unmarried at his house in Grosvenor Street on 17 July 1883 and was buried on the west side of Highgate Cemetery. He did not attain to large practice, but both his character and attainments were esteemed by the physicians of his time.
