= James Halyburton =

James Halyburton or Haliburton may refer to:

- James Haliburton, 5th Lord Haliburton of Dirleton (died c. 1502), Lord Haliburton of Dirleton
- James Halyburton (reformer) (1518–1589), Scottish Protestant reformer
- Sir James Halyburton (fl. 1586–1617), commissioner for Forfarshire in 1617, great-nephew of the above
- James Halyburton (1707 MP) (died c. 1743), commissioner for Forfarshire in 1702 and Member of Parliament for Forfarshire in 1707
- James Halyburton (Orkney and Shetland MP) (died 1765), British Army officer and Member of Parliament for Orkney and Shetland
- James Burton (property developer) (born James Haliburton, 1761–1837), British property developer
- James Burton (Egyptologist) (born James Haliburton, 1788–1862), British Egyptologist
- James Dandridge Halyburton (1803–1879), United States federal judge
