= Andrew Stewart (minister) =

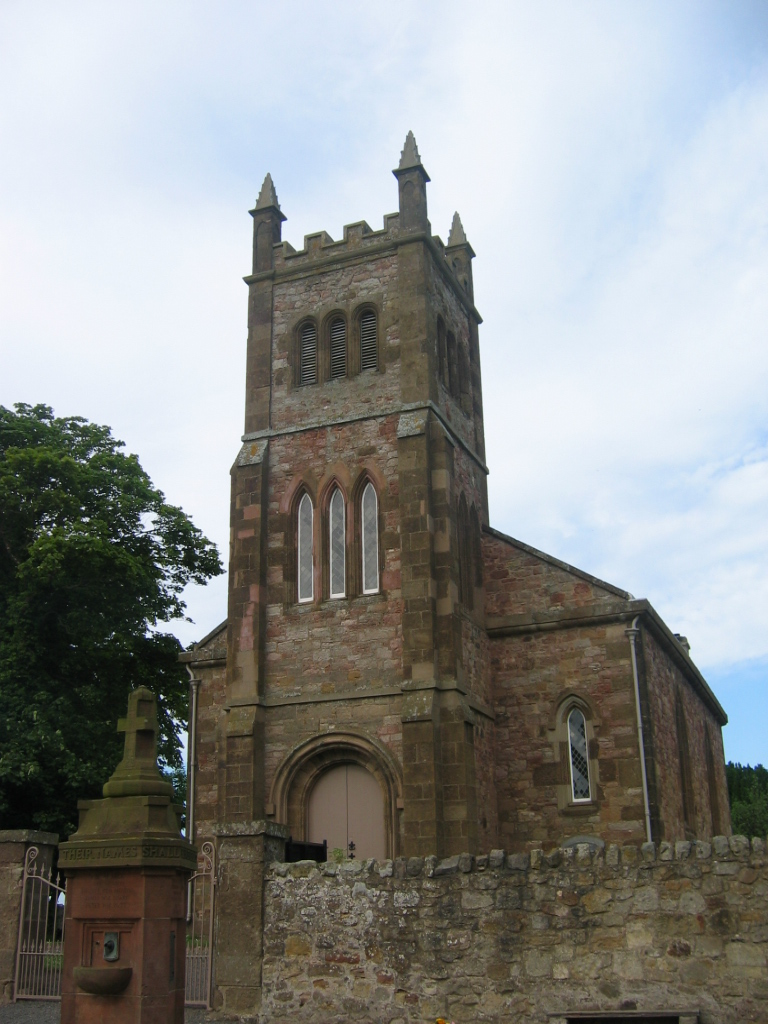
Bolton Parish Church

Andrew Stewart FRSE (9 October 1771 – 26 December 1838) was a Scottish physician and minister of the Church of Scotland.

== Life ==
He was born in Cleughside near Annan, Dumfriesshire on 9 October 1771.

He trained in both divinity and medicine. He received his doctorate (MD) from the University of Edinburgh in 1802.

In 1805 he became minister of Bolton, East Lothian. In 1811 he was elected a Fellow of the Royal Society of Edinburgh. His proposers were James Bonar, John Playfair, and David Brewster.

In 1809 he organised the building of a new church at Bolton, the architect being Archibald Elliot of Edinburgh.

In 1815 he was translated to Erskine and remained there for the rest of his working life. The church in Erskine was then newly rebuilt, the old church having been demolished in 1815. The new church was designed by David Hamilton.

He died in Erskine on Boxing Day, 26 December 1838, aged 67. He is buried in the churchyard of his church.

His son was the physician Alexander Patrick Stewart.
