= Dirleton Castle =

Fortress in Scotland

- Dirleton, East Lothian, Scotland grid reference NT 51824 83959
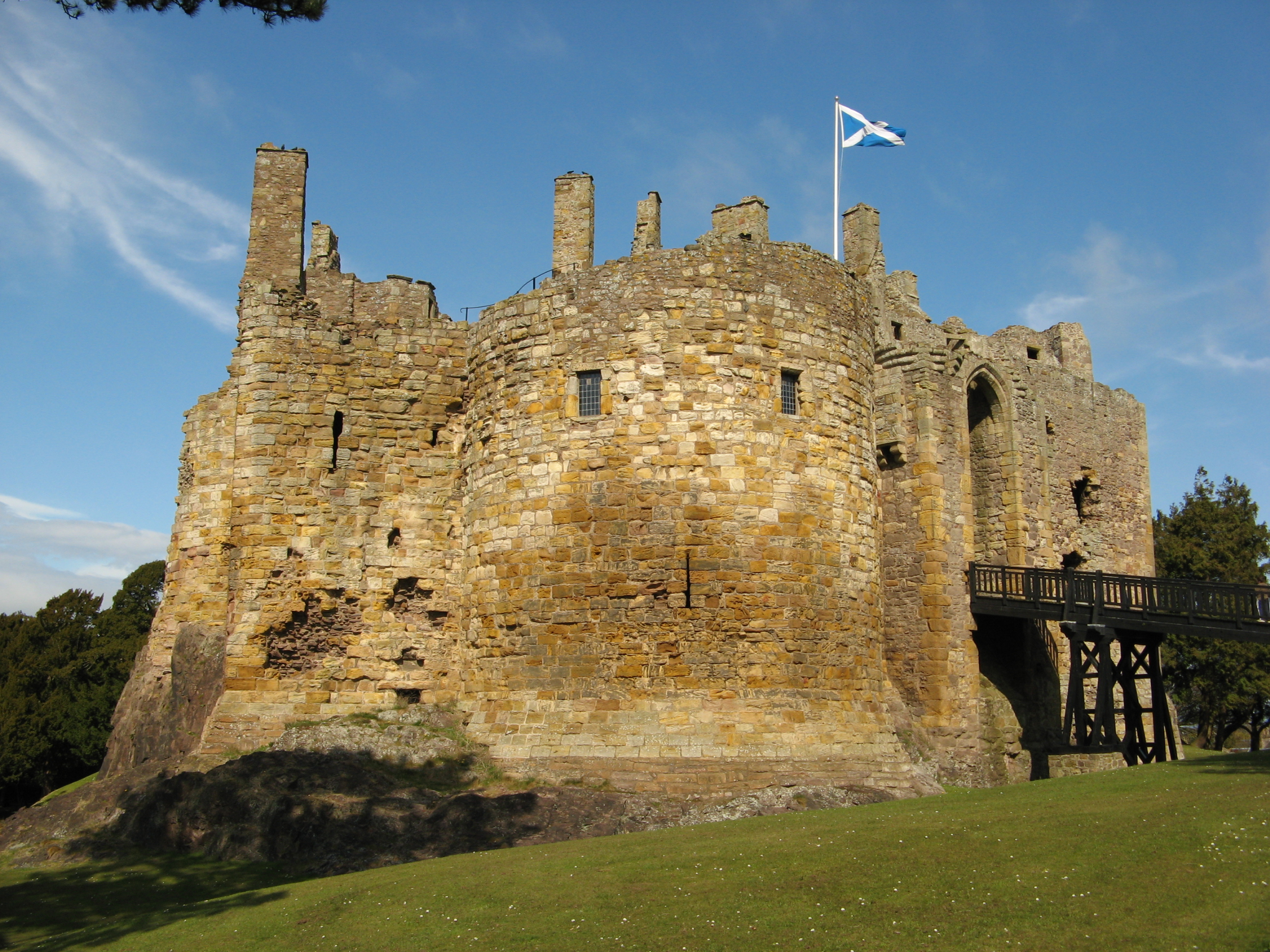
- The 13th-century keep

Site information
- Type: Castle of enceinte
- Owner: Historic Environment Scotland
- Open to the public: Yes
- Condition: Ruined

Location
- Location within East Lothian
- Coordinates: 56.05°N 2.78°W

Site history
- Built: Early 13th century
- Built by: John de Vaux
- In use: Until 1650
- Materials: Stone

Designations

Inventory of Gardens and Designed Landscapes in Scotland
- Official name: Dirleton Castle
- Designated: 30 June 1987
- Reference no.: GDL00136

Dirleton Castle is a medieval fortress in the village of Dirleton, East Lothian, Scotland. It lies around 2 miles (3.2 km) west of North Berwick, and around 19 miles (31 km) east of Edinburgh. The oldest parts of the castle date to the 13th century, and it was abandoned by the end of the 17th century.

Begun in around 1240 by John De Vaux, the castle was heavily damaged during the Wars of Scottish Independence, when it was twice taken by the English. In the 14th century, Dirleton was repaired by the Haliburton family, and it was acquired by the Ruthvens in 1505. The Ruthvens were involved in several plots against Mary, Queen of Scots, and King James VI, and eventually forfeited the castle in 1600. Dirleton ceased to be a residence, although Oliver Cromwell was forced to besiege the castle to flush out a band of "mosstroopers" (marauders), during the Third English Civil War in 1650. The damaged castle was then acquired by John Nisbet, Lord Dirleton, who decided to build a new country house on the nearby Archerfield Estate. The Nisbet family of Dirleton continued to maintain the castle's gardens, before handing Dirleton into state care in 1923. The ruins and gardens are now maintained by Historic Environment Scotland.

Dirleton Castle stands on a rocky outcrop, at the heart of the rich agricultural lands of the barony of Dirleton, and guards the coastal approach to Edinburgh from England, via the port of North Berwick. The ruins comprise a 13th-century keep, and a 16th-century house which the Ruthvens built adjacent. Only the basement levels survive of the 14th- and 15th-century additions built by the Haliburtons, although these comprised a large hall and tower house along the east range. Other buildings within the courtyard have also been demolished. Surrounding the castle are gardens, which may have been first laid out in the 16th century, although the present planting is largely of the 20th century. The garden walls enclose a 16th-century doocot, or pigeon house.

== History ==
=== de Vaux ===
Arms of de Vaux, Vaus, Vass, Vauss, etc., Latinised to de Vallibus, lairds of Dirletoun: Argent, a bend gules. De Vaux, Baron of Gilsland in Cumberland, bore arms: Argent, a bend checqy or and gules

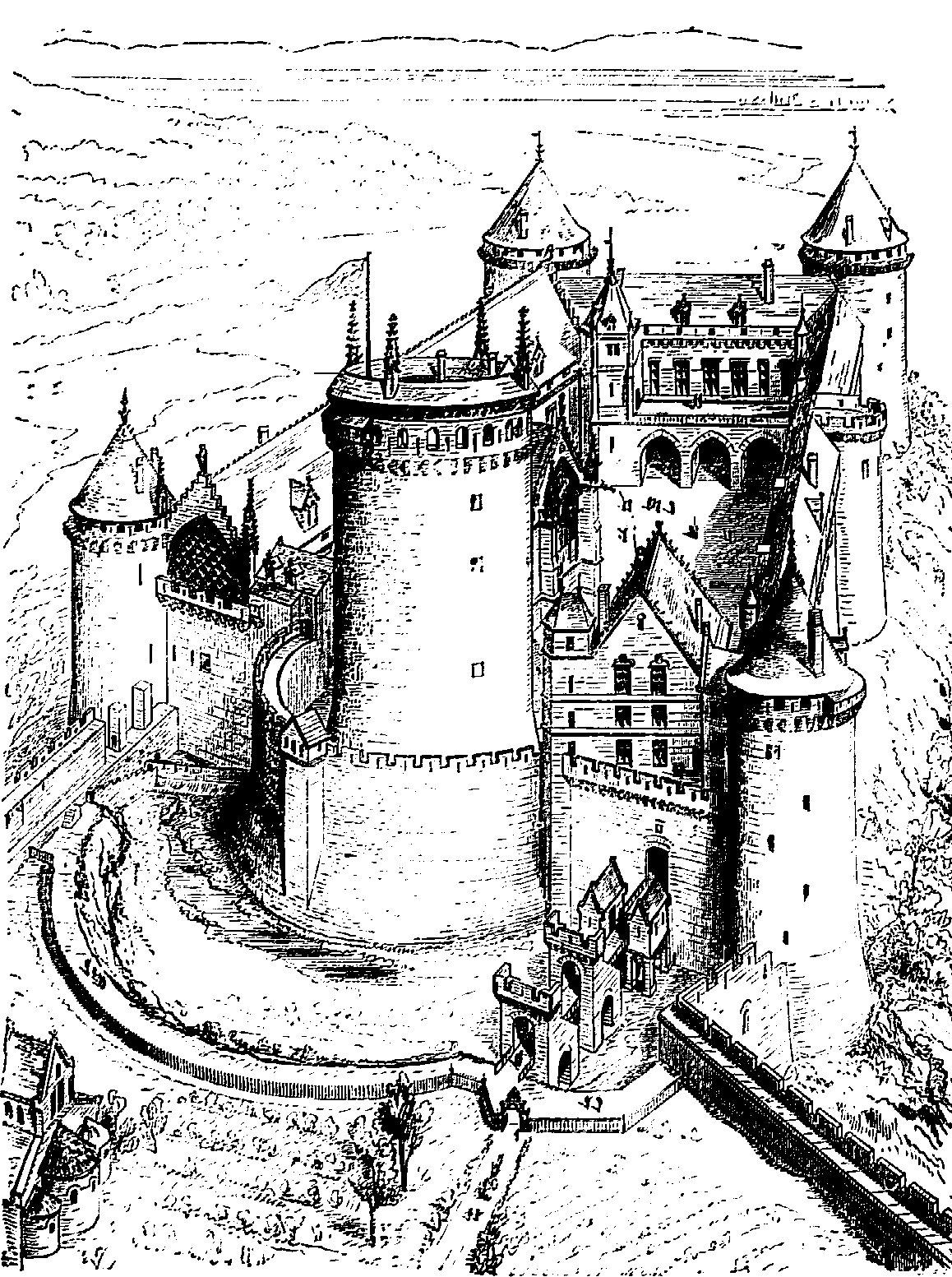
Reconstruction drawing, by Eugène Viollet-le-Duc, of the Château de Coucy, which probably influenced the design of Dirleton

The Norman family of de Vaux originated in Rouen, northern France, and settled in England following the Norman Conquest of 1066. Two de Vaux brothers, or cousins, were among a number of Anglo-Norman knights invited to Scotland, and granted land, by King David I of Scotland in the 12th century. Hubert de Vaux was given the barony of Gilsland in Cumbria, at that time part of Scotland, while John de Vaux was granted the barony of Dirleton. John built a castle at Eldbotle, probably to the north-west of modern Dirleton, and another, named Tarbet Castle, on the island of Fidra, although neither survives.

In 1220, Fidra was gifted to the monks of Dryburgh Abbey by William de Vaux. William's son, another John, had been held hostage in England as surety for the good conduct of King William the Lion in 1213, and succeeded to the barony in the 1220s. He then began the construction of a replacement for Tarbet at Dirleton, which was recorded as a "castellum" in 1225, although this may refer to an earlier timber structure. In 1239, de Vaux was appointed seneschal, or steward, to Marie de Coucy, on her marriage to King Alexander II. Marie de Coucy was the daughter of Enguerrand III, Lord of Coucy (d.1242), builder of the Château de Coucy, in Picardy (c.1220s), which probably served as a model for Dirleton. The 13th-century stone castle, of which only the donjon, or keep, remains, represented a show of de Vaux's status, and would have required peaceful times to permit a prolonged construction project.

Peaceful times ended in 1296, with the outbreak of the Wars of Scottish Independence. Dirleton, which guarded the route between Edinburgh and the English border, changed hands several times through the invasions of the English under King Edward I. During the campaign of summer 1298, the castle was besieged by English forces under Antony Bek, the Bishop of Durham. Dirleton withstood the assault for several months, until the English victory at Falkirk allowed them to bring up large siege engines, after which the castle was soon reduced. Dirleton was garrisoned by the English, but must have been retaken by the Scots before 1306, when the English commander Aymer de Valence, 2nd Earl of Pembroke recaptured Dirleton once more. It was finally retaken by the Scots some time before 1314, and was slighted, or deliberately damaged, to prevent its reuse by the English.

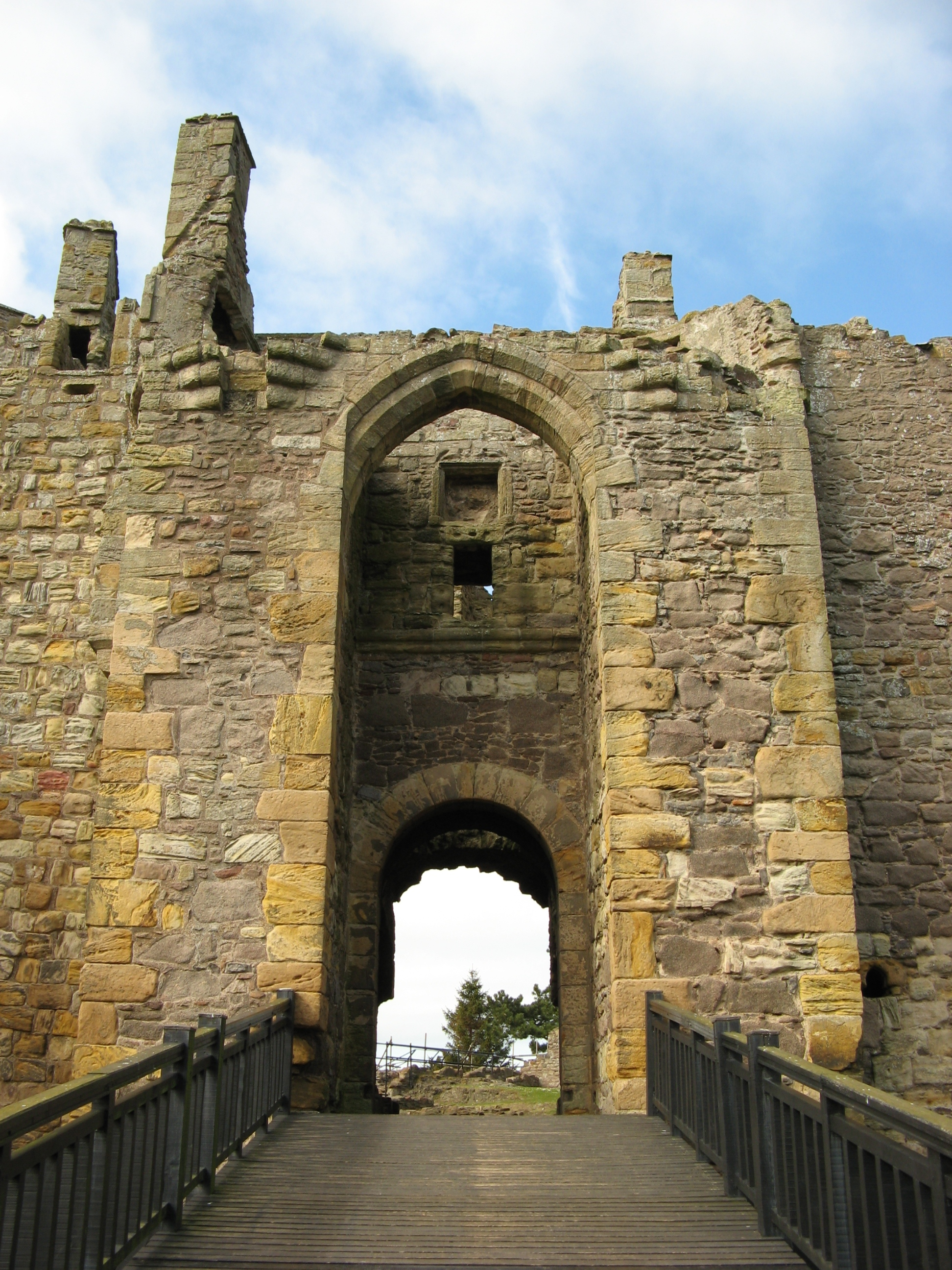
The main gate, built in by the Haliburtons

=== Haliburton ===
The castle and lands of Dirleton passed to the Berwickshire family of Haliburton (or Halyburton) when John Haliburton (d.1355) married the heiress of the de Vaux family, shortly before 1350. The castle had been repaired by 1363, when it was seized by William Douglas, 1st Earl of Douglas, during his brief rebellion against King David II, although it was later returned to the Haliburtons. In the 1420s, Sir Walter Haliburton (d. before 1447) acted as a hostage in exchange for the release of King James I, who had been held captive by the English since 1406. He was rewarded in 1439 by being appointed Treasurer of Scotland. Either Walter, or his eldest son John (d. before 1454), was ennobled as a Lord of Parliament in the 1440s, with the title Lord Dirletoun. The Haliburtons carried out extensive works at Dirleton, heightening the original towers, and constructing a new gatehouse to the south-east. A large hall and tower house were added to the castle in the 15th century, forming the east range.

King James IV visited Dirleton in September 1505, and gave money to the masons then engaged on works in the north-east part of the castle. Later that year, Patrick, the last Haliburton of Dirleton, died, and his estates were divided among his three daughters, Janet, Margaret, and Mariotta. James IV made Patrick Haliburton's widow Christiane Wawane and her brother William Wawane keepers of Dirleton in August 1507.

=== Ruthven ===
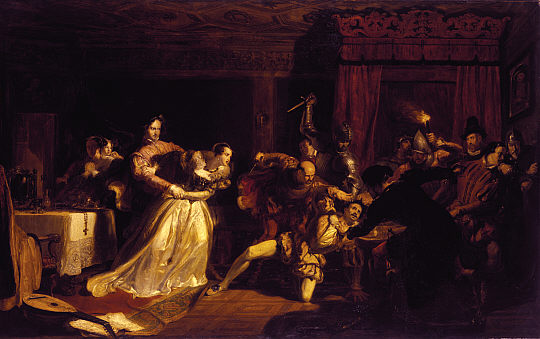
The Murder of David Rizzio, by Sir William Allan, depicting Lord Ruthven and others killing the Queen's secretary in her presence

The eldest daughter, Janet, married William Ruthven, 2nd Lord Ruthven (d. 1552) in 1515, and the castle and lordship of Dirleton passed to the Ruthven family. The son of William and Janet, Patrick, 3rd Lord Ruthven (c. 1520–1566), was one of the leaders of the group who murdered David Riccio, private secretary to Mary, Queen of Scots, in 1566. Patrick was forced to flee to England, where he died, leaving Dirleton to his son William (c. 1541–1584), who was created Earl of Gowrie in 1581. Lord Gowrie led a plot, later known as the Raid of Ruthven, in which the 16-year-old King James VI was seized, in August 1582. Ruthven then ruled in the king's name, while James was held captive. Although Gowrie was pardoned the following year, he was executed in 1584 for his part in another plot to seize Stirling Castle, and his lands were forfeited to the crown. A keen amateur arboriculturalist, Lord Gowrie is thought to have laid out the gardens at Dirleton, and planted numerous trees.

After the attempted coup failed in May 1584, Dorothea Stewart, Countess of Gowrie, was commanded to surrender Dirleton, Ruthven, Cousland, and the Gowrie lodging in Perth to the crown. James VI granted Dirleton to the Earl of Arran, who entertained the King there for twelve days in May 1585, while there was plague in Edinburgh. The entertainment included a sumptuous banquet and a Robin Hood play. The following year, the castle was restored to Dorothea Stewart, widow of the first Earl, and by 1600 had passed to John Ruthven, 3rd Earl of Gowrie (c. 1577–1600), their second son. Dorothea Stewart and her new husband Andrew Kerr of Faldonsyde complained in 1597 about a group of local men who stole rabbits from the links of Dirleton and terrorised her tenants. She was still living in the castle in November 1600.

Dirleton played a role in the story of the “Gowrie Conspiracy” of 1600 in that there has long been suspicion that the castle was taken from the Ruthvens and given to Thomas Erskine as a reward for assisting James VI in the murder of Patrick Ruthven's sons: John, 3rd Earl of Gowrie, and his brother Alexander. The official narrative of the Gowrie Conspiracy, provided afterwards by the king, was that he and fifteen retainers, Erskine among them, had arrived at Gowrie House one night in August 1600 because he had been invited there by Alexander. However, as the narrative goes, the two brothers attempted to assassinate James, and in the melee that followed, the two Ruthvens were killed. While this was happening at Gowrie House, the other two Ruthven brothers, William and Patrick, were at Dirleton, apparently unaware of the plot afoot. Finding much to doubt in the king's account, many have argued that James went to Gowrie House with his retinue for the express purpose of murdering John and Alexander, partly because the king owed the Earl of Gowrie a large sum of money and partly because there had long been a rumor that Gowrie was the grandson of James IV, which, if true, would have put him in line for the throne ahead of James VI. After the killings, the king divided the Gowrie estates and bestowed them on the men who had been with him that night. Erskine received the gift of Dirleton Castle in November 1600, which some perceive to be a form of "blood money". This perception is further substantiated by the fact that Erskine was created Baron Erskine of Dirletowne in 1604.

Erskine sold the castle to Sir James Douglas in 1625. Douglas sold it on to Alexander Morieson of Prestongrange, who sold it in turn, in 1631, to James Maxwell of Innerwick (d. c. 1650), who was created Earl of Dirletoun in 1646. In October 1641 the Earl of Argyll, Marquess of Hamilton and Earl of Lanark were forced to flee from Edinburgh to Dirleton, the home of Hamilton's mother-in-law, Elizabeth de Boussy, due the conspiracy known as the Incident.

=== Cromwell ===
Oliver Cromwell's army invaded Scotland in 1650, during the Third English Civil War, and defeated the Scots Royalists at Dunbar on 3 September. With this victory, Cromwell gained effective control of southern Scotland, but bands of Royalist moss-troopers continued to harry the English supply lines. One such band was based at Dirleton, and Cromwell ordered General Monck and General Lambert, with 1,600 troops, to capture the castle. This was achieved on 10 November, using mortars to destroy the drawbridge and inner gate. The captain of the moss-troopers was hanged from the walls with two of his comrades. The castle was slighted once more, and although briefly used as a field hospital, it was then left to decay. The soldier and engineer responsible for Cromwell's effective use of artillery was a German, Major Joachim Hane. He also designed fortresses near Inverness and in Ayr, and directed the mortar fire at the siege of Stirling Castle in August 1651. He later spent a year spying for Cromwell's Secretary of State, John Thurloe.

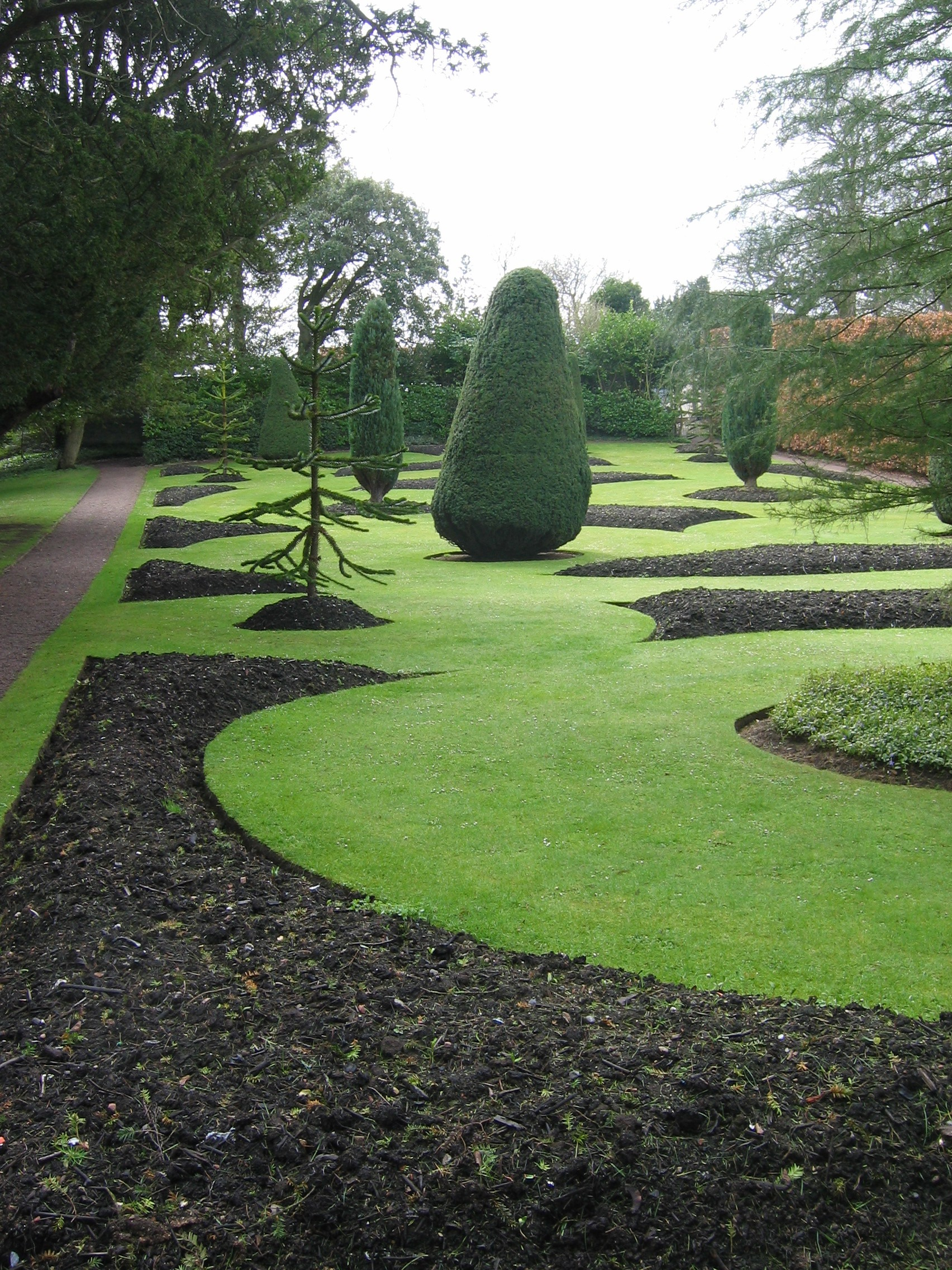
The west flower garden

=== Nisbet ===
Dirleton Castle and estate were purchased, from the widowed Countess of Dirletoun, by the lawyer John Nisbet (c. 1609–1687) in 1663. Nisbet, who took the title Lord Dirleton when he was appointed as a judge, built a new house at Archerfield, to the north-west of the village. The Nisbets continued to maintain the gardens around the castle as part of the park around Archerfield, and installed the bowling green. The 19th-century garden walls were added by Mary Nisbet, Lady Elgin (1778–1855), wife of the Earl of Elgin, as part of a "beautification" of Dirleton village. In the mid-19th century, two new parterres were laid out by the head gardener, David Thompson. Although neither survived, the west garden was restored, based on 19th-century plans, in 1993. The north garden was replaced in the 1920s with an Arts and Crafts-style garden of herbaceous borders. Also in the 1920s, the castle was passed into state care, and is now maintained by Historic Environment Scotland, an agency of the Scottish Government.

The castle and grounds are protected as a Scheduled Ancient Monument, while the gardens appear on the Inventory of Gardens and Designed Landscapes in Scotland, the national register of historic gardens. The castle, doocot, and boundary walls are Category A listed buildings, the highest level of protection for a historic building in Scotland.

== Witches of Dirleton Castle ==
Between 1649-50 almost 600 people in south and east Scotland (mainly women) were accused of witchcraft. Six were from Dirleton.

=== Agnes Clarkson ===
In June 1649, Agnes Clarkson, who was a widow, confessed to witchcraft after an interrogation (thought to be by the church court, or presbytery, led by John Makghie, the church minister of Dirleton Kirk). She said that had been visited by a woman from Longniddry who had already been burned for witchcraft, and later she had been visited by the devil himself "in the liknesse of a black dun dogge and went up and doun the hous, and seised upon the said Agnes her cloths, and therafter, turning into the liknesse of a black man, had carnall copulation with her.”. She became the devil's servant, and attended “a meeting of the devil and sundrie others with him upon the green of Diriltoun”. She named the other people who were there and had danced with the devil. She accused Patrick Watson of nearby West Fenton, his wife Manie Halieburton, and Bessie Hogge. Her evidence led to the witches trial. It was likely she was held in Dirleton castle's pit prison.

=== Manie Halieburton and Patrick Watson ===
Manie Halieburton was accused of witchcraft by her husband Patrick Watson and by Agnes Clarkson. She confessed to having been tricked by the devil eighteen years previously. When their daughter was sick, the devil appeared as a man who claimed to be a physician. They had fed him and paid him she had "had carnall copulatioun" with him, when Patrick was out. So she became the devil's servant.

The trial included being assessed by the 'witch pricker' John Kincaid, who searched for a part of the accused body which was not subject to pain, or other 'devil's mark' bodily signs to be used as evidence that they were indeed witches. Kincaid said "I fand the divellis marke upon the baksyde of the said Patrik Watson a little under the point of his left shoulder, and upon the left syde of the said Meinie Halliburton hir neck a little abone hir left shoulder, whairof they wer not sensible, nether came furth thairof any bloode.”

=== Bessie Hogge, Marione Meik and Margaret Goodfellow ===
The evidence against these three women, has not survived, but they were accused of dancing with the devil or otherwise participating in a relationship with him.

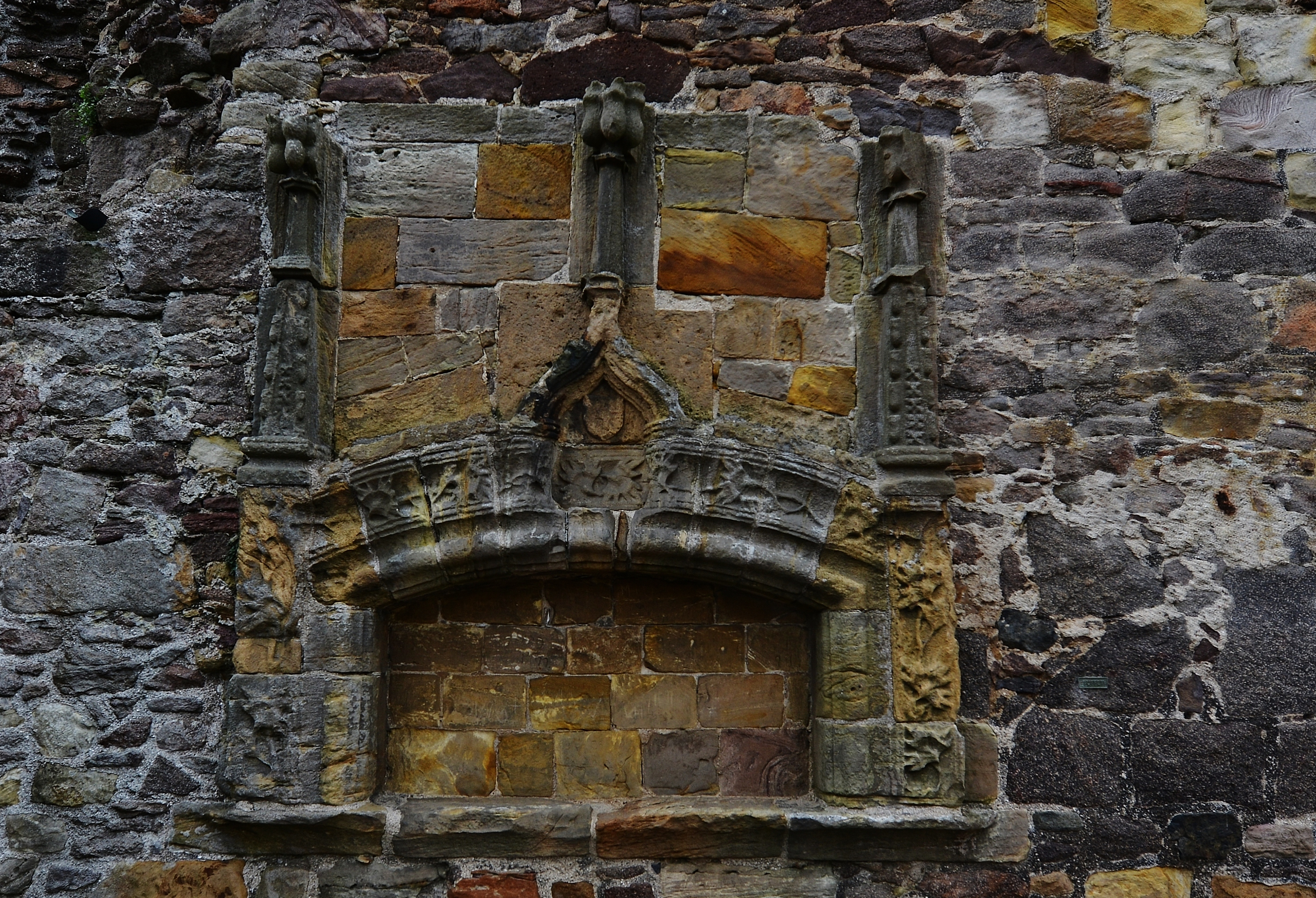
Dirleton Castle, Great Hall (detail)

The trials took place in the Dirleton Castle Great Hall, and although the sentence and action taken do not survive either, those accused were usually executed, as required by law, often by strangling.

=== Official apology ===
In March 2022,Nicola Sturgeon, the first minister of Scotland, issued an officially apology for the first time, for the persecution of alleged witches during the 16th, 17th, and 18th centuries. Of the people that were accused of witchcraft, a vast majority of them were women. "They were arrested, brutally tortured and coerced into false confessions. Two-thirds of those accused were executed, according to historians."

== Description ==
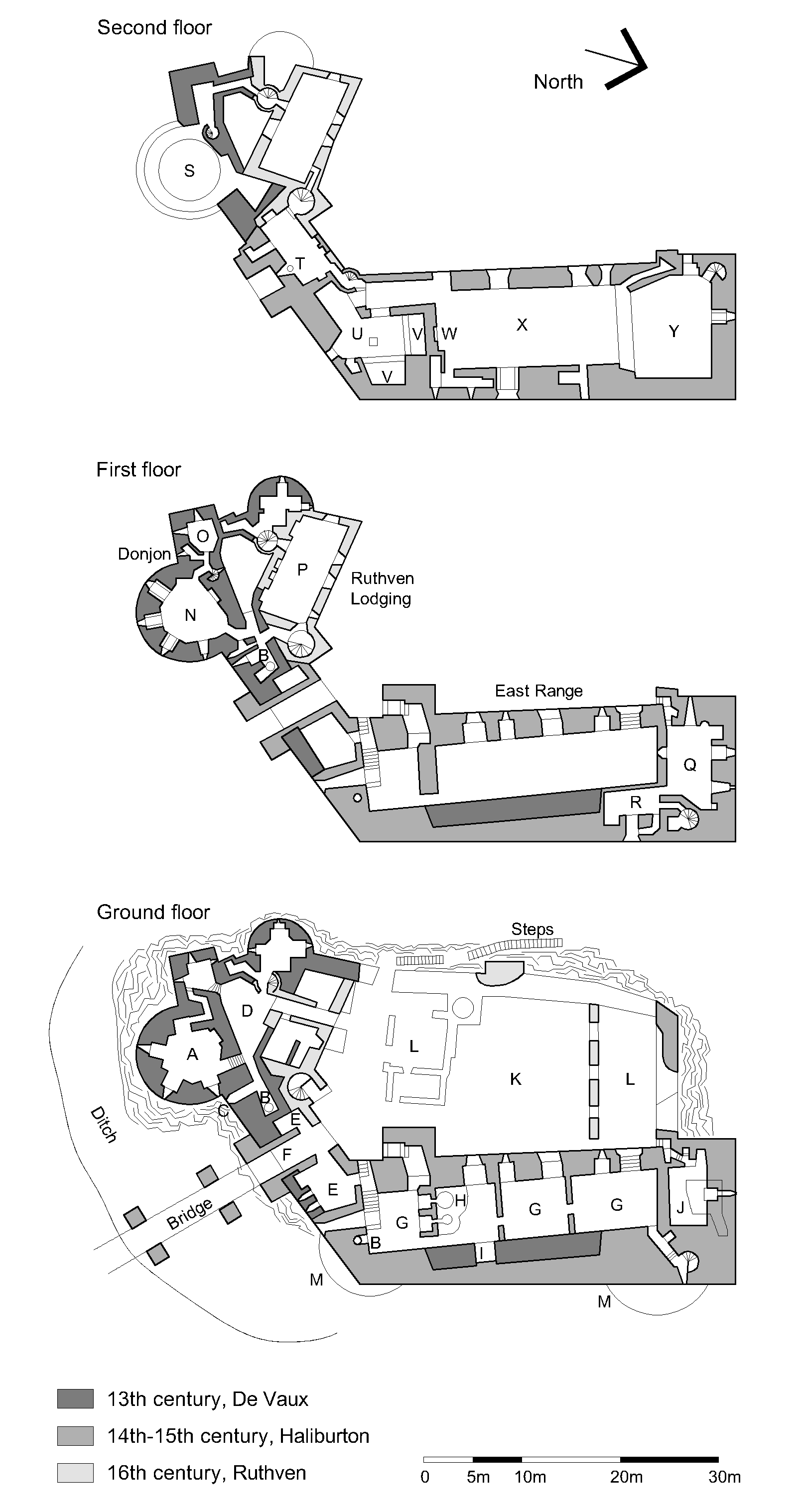
Floor plans of the castle. Ground floor: A Kitchen. B Well. C Postern. D Inner courtyard. E Guard rooms. F Entrance passage. G Cellars. H Ovens. I Former postern. J Prison, with pit below. K Courtyard. L Demolished ranges. M Bases of demolished 13th-century towers. First floor: N Lord's hall. O Lord's bedchamber. P Dining room. Q Chapel. R Priest's chamber. Second floor: S Gun emplacement on roof. T Murder hole. U Kitchen. V Kitchen fireplaces. W Buffet. X Great hall. Y Lord's chamber, base of tower house.

The castle is built on a natural rocky outcrop, on a low ridge overlooking the farmland of East Lothian. It comprises a kite-shaped courtyard, 40 metres (130 ft) by 27 metres (89 ft), flanked by buildings on the south and east sides. The most substantial remains are the Ruthven Lodging, the gatehouse, and the de Vaux keep to the south, while only the basement of the east range survives. Fragments of the north and west curtain walls outline the courtyard, which was formerly divided in two by further 16th-century buildings. The castle was originally approached from the south, via a bridge and 3.4-metre (11 ft) drawbridge, across a 15-metre (49 ft) wide ditch. In the 16th century, steps were built to access the Ruthven lodging from the west.

=== The keep ===
The keep, or donjon, survives largely intact from the 13th century, and forms the south-west part of the present castle. Described by architectural historian W. D. Simpson as a "cluster keep", it comprises a large round tower to the south, a smaller round tower to the west, with the two joined by a square tower. The masonry is of squared ashlar, or dressed stone blocks. Internally, the original use of the rooms is difficult to interpret, although the round towers may have served as private suites for Lord Dirleton and his Lady. The large tower contains a six-sided chamber at ground level, possibly a kitchen, with a seven-sided main chamber above. This room has a pointed vaulted ceiling, window seats in the large windows around the south wall, and a carved fireplace at the north. To the east is a postern, or side door, and beyond is a well. Adjacent to the well is a floor hatch, which would have allowed food to be transferred directly from the kitchen to a servery above. A room in the square tower to the west, possibly the lord's bedroom, has holes in the ceiling to allow smoke from braziers to escape. The more ruined west round tower probably contained another hall, with chambers above and storage below. In the 17th century, the top of the main round tower was lowered and remodelled to form a gun platform.

Only fragments of the rest of the 13th-century castle remain. A fourth tower, where the Ruthven lodging now stands, may have completed the "cluster keep". Bases of round towers at the south-east and north-east corners of the castle are visible below the later walls. Parts of the north-west wall are 13th-century work, as is the blocked postern in the basement of the east range. The overall plan of the castle, however, was not greatly changed through later rebuilding work. Dirleton is the earliest dated example in Scotland of a castle with round towers that project beyond the curtain wall, as opposed to those at Dunstaffnage, for example, where the towers are contained within the walls. This new form was subsequently used in other 13th-century Scottish castles, including Bothwell and Kildrummy.

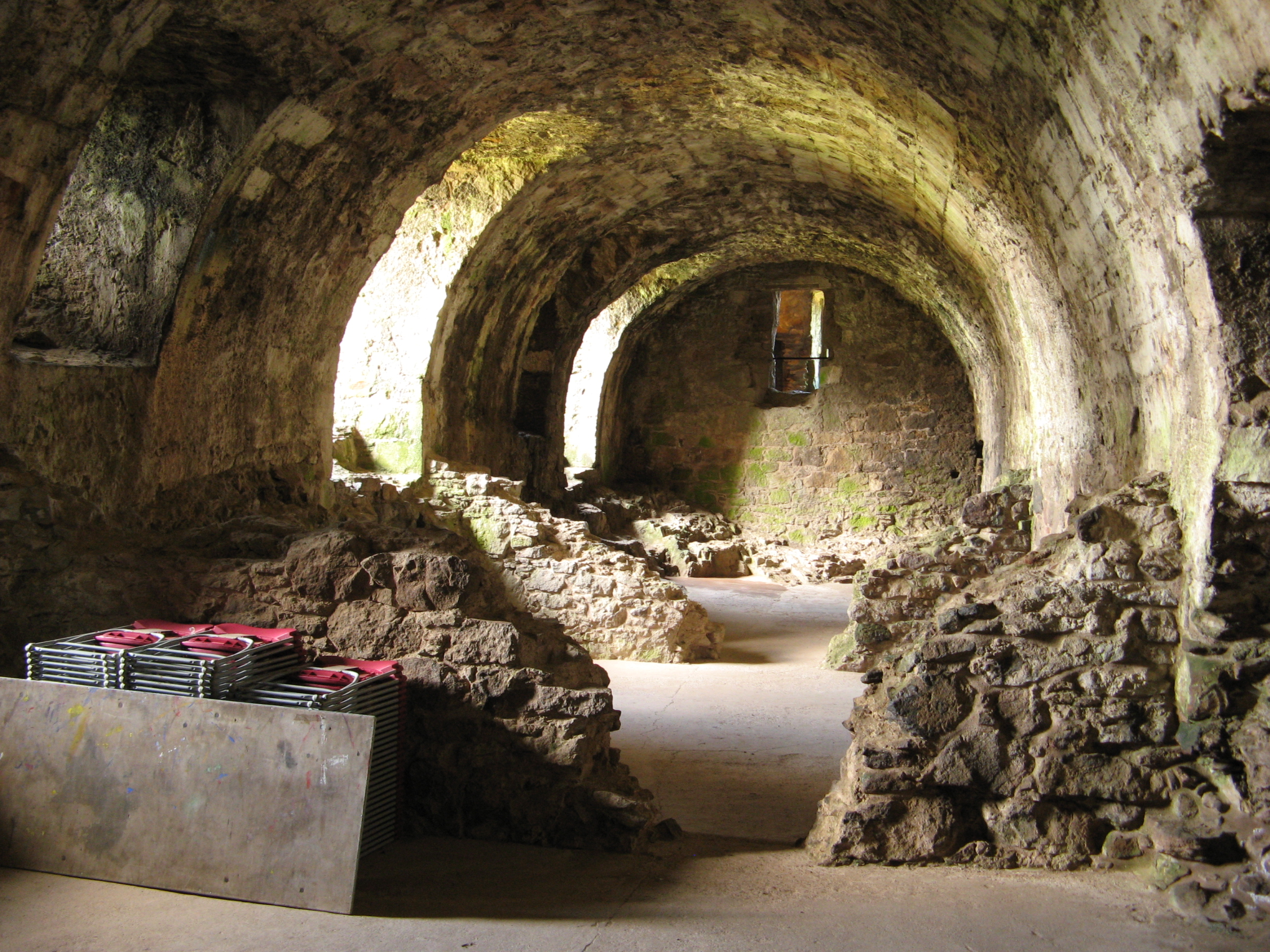
Vaulted basement of the east range

=== The east range and gatehouse ===
The gatehouse, kitchens, and east range were built by the Haliburtons in the 14th and 15th centuries. The gatehouse, built in the 14th century to the east of the keep, is similar to the one at nearby Tantallon Castle. It is fronted by a high, pointed arch, formerly with bartizans, small round turrets, at the top. The gate was protected by a drawbridge over the outer ditch, a portcullis, and three sets of doors. Guard rooms open off the entrance passage, and a round opening in the roof, known as a "murder hole", allowed defenders to drop objects on to any attacker who breached the outer gate.

The large kitchens occupy the south-east angle of the castle. The 9-metre (30 ft) high main kitchen has two 4-metre (13 ft) wide fireplaces for cooking, and a circular vent in the vaulted ceiling. Hatches in the floor give access to a well (11.5 metres (38 ft) deep) and cellars below. The adjacent passage linked the kitchen to the hall in the east range.

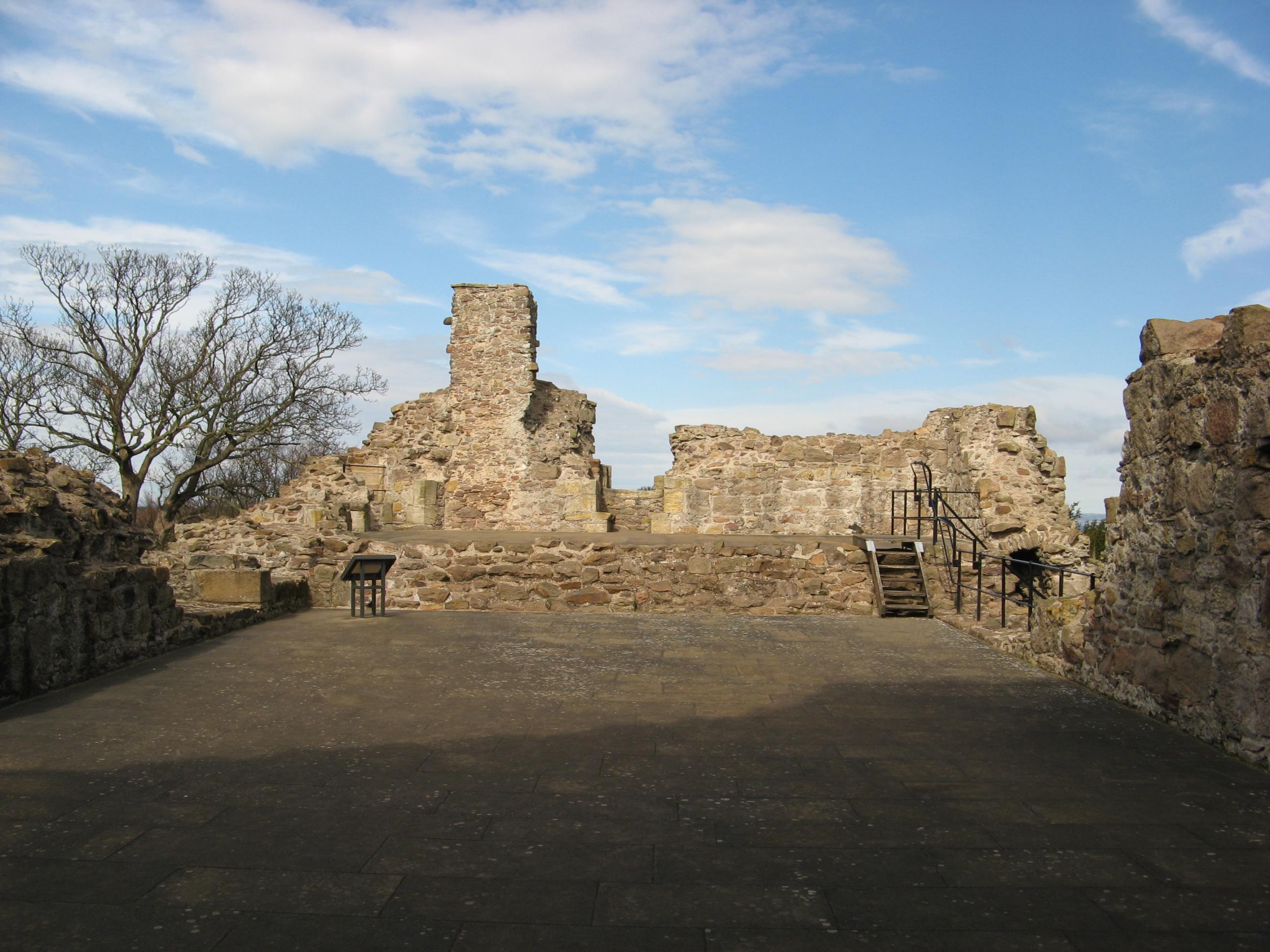
Remains of the hall and the basement of the tower house

The east range itself runs the length of the east side of the castle, and originally comprised a large hall, with a square tower house at the north-east corner. Although only the basement survives, this once formed one of the finest noble residences of its time in Scotland, and would have been similar to the contemporary buildings at Doune Castle. The basement is a single tunnel vault, with low walls subdividing the area into stores. Two large ovens and a well lie at the south end, while at the east is the 13th-century postern, blocked when the wall was thickened to support the new buildings above, and re-used as a fireplace. At the north end of the basement is a vaulted prison for freemen, and below this, a rock-cut pit, 3 metres (9.8 ft) square, to house prisoners of the peasant classes. Above the prison, but still within the basement, is a vaulted chapel with various ceremonial recesses, such as a sacristy and a piscina, or water basin. A private chamber for the priest is next door. The hall above is 22 metres (72 ft) by 7.5 metres (25 ft), and once had a high timber roof, and a minstrel's gallery at the south end. An ornately carved stone buffet, or cupboard, is located on this wall, which formed part of the servery next to the kitchen. At the north-east corner of the castle, a tower house provided accommodation for the Lord's family and guests. Again, only the lowest floor remains, above the chapel. This probably formed a private chamber for the Lord, and was connected to the adjacent hall.

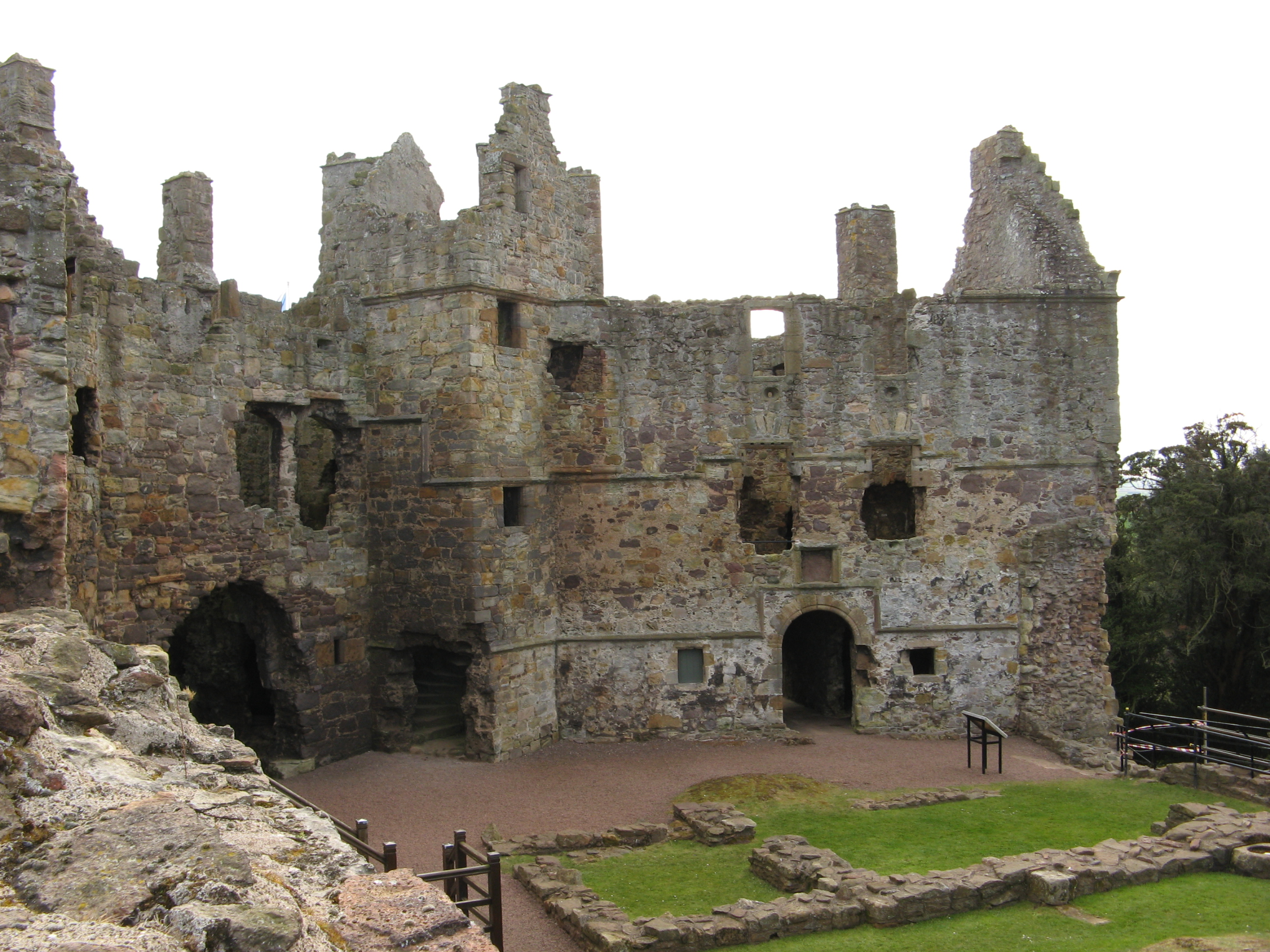
The north façade of the Ruthven Lodging

=== The Ruthven Lodging ===
Constructed by the Ruthvens after they acquired the castle around 1515, the Ruthven Lodging represents the final stage of building at Dirleton. In the later part of the 16th century, it served as the main residence of Lady Dorothea, wife of the first Earl of Gowrie, and their 15 children. The three-storey building is constructed, like the Haliburton range, from undressed stone, although the Ruthven Lodging is decorated with string courses, horizontal mouldings running around the walls. The large windows were protected by iron grilles and small gun holes. The rectangular Lodging is immediately to the north of the de Vaux building, separated by a narrow irregular courtyard, which is accessed via a passage in the ground floor of the Lodging. The remainder of the ground floor was occupied by cellars, with family rooms and bedrooms on the upper floors. The first-floor dining room was paved with patterned floor tiles, and may once have had a painted timber ceiling.

== The gardens ==
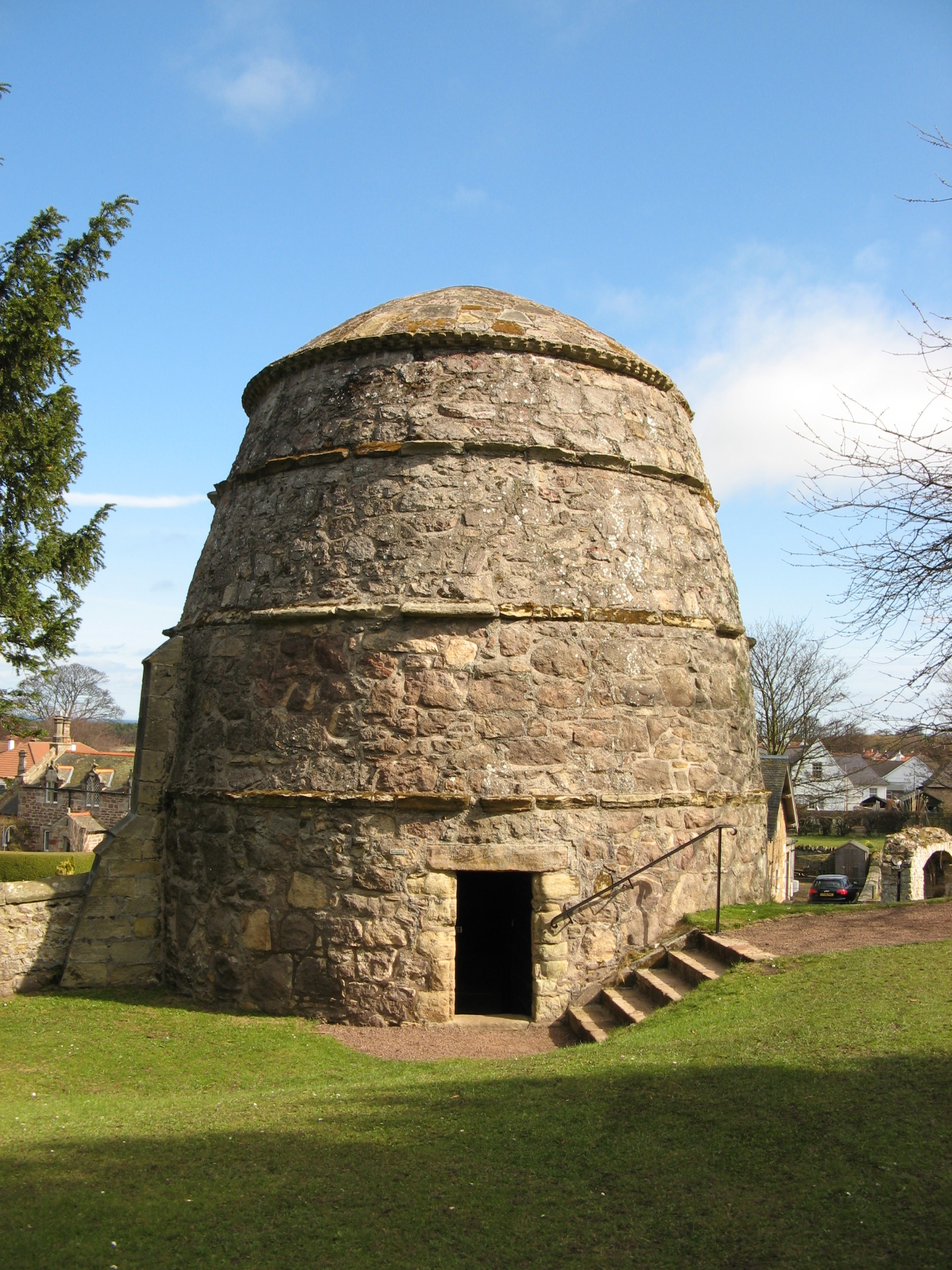
The 16th-century doocot

The castle is set within extensive gardens, bounded by a 19th-century wall. The gardens were first laid out in the 16th century, but have undergone many changes. A bowling green lies to the west of the castle, fringed by yew trees, which may once have formed a hedge around a parterre in this area. West of the bowling green is a flower garden, laid out in 1993 to an 18th-century design, and containing yew, cedar, monkey puzzle and Lawson's cypress trees. To the north is the 1920s Arts and Crafts garden, which is home to a 215-metre (705 ft) -long herbaceous border, and is overlooked by a castellated 19th-century gazebo, or summer house. The border is recognised by the Guinness Book of Records as being the longest in the world. The rest of the gardens comprise lawns, with numerous mature specimen trees, including redwood, beech, and sycamore.

There is a well-preserved 16th-century beehive-shaped doocot, or pigeon house, in the castle grounds. The doocot is 7.6 metres (25 ft) high, and contains around 1000 nesting boxes for pigeons, which were an important source of food for the castle's inhabitants. To the north-east, now located outside the castle gardens, is a 16th-century gateway which formerly served the castle, but now serves the adjacent farm.
