= The Incident (conspiracy) =

1641 plot to kidnap Scottish nobles

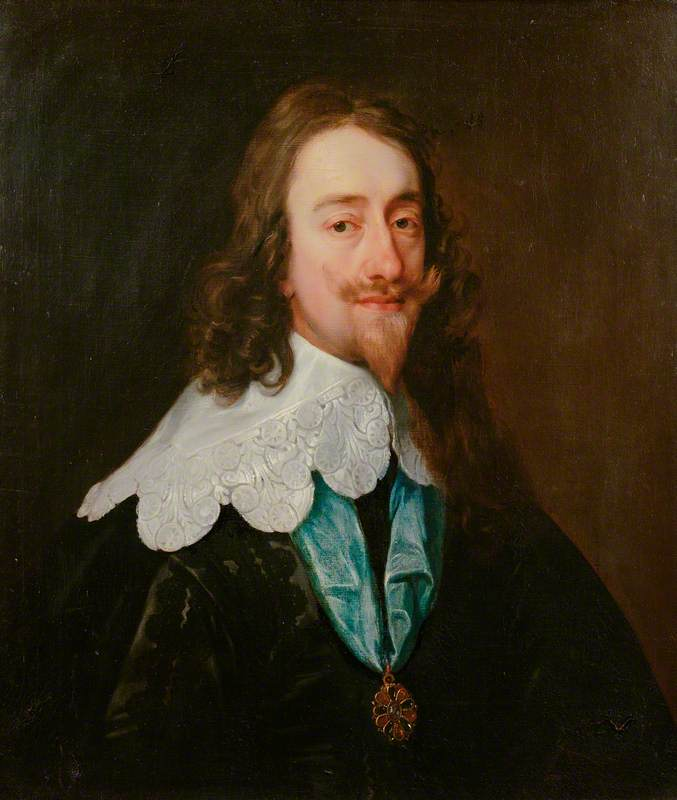
Charles I

The Incident was a Royalist plot to kidnap a group of Scottish nobles. The Incident took place in October 1641 during the Wars of the Three Kingdoms, and the plot's targets were all prominent members of the Presbyterian Covenanter faction who opposed Charles I's attempts to control the Scottish Church.

The plot was directed against Archibald Campbell, 1st Marquess of Argyll, James Hamilton, Marquis of Hamilton, and the latter's brother, William Hamilton, Earl of Lanark. The plot was hatched by Argyll's Royalist rival James Graham, 1st Marquess of Montrose, who had already attempted to have Argyll charged with high treason.

The plot failed and Charles, denying any involvement in the matter, was left with no option but to agree to the Covenanters' demands that he assent to the abolition of episcopacy in Scotland, and appoint Covenanting nobles to the Privy Council of Scotland and other positions.

== History ==
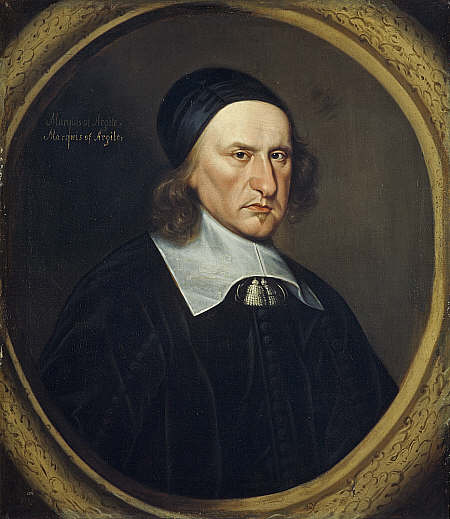
Archibald Campbell, 1st Marquess of Argyll

Charles I, King of England and of Scotland, had been forced to agree a truce with the Covenanters, to conclude the Bishops' Wars of 1639–1640. In August 1641 he ratified the Treaty of London, and travelled to Edinburgh to finalise negotiations with the Scottish Parliament. Charles hoped to make common cause with the Earl of Argyll, the effective leader of the Presbyterian Covenanters, against the English Long Parliament, and created him Marquis of Argyll.

The Marquis of Hamilton, while remaining a Royalist, sought to develop a friendship with the Marquis of Argyll. It is not clear how much Charles I approved of this liaison, but many in the Scottish Royalist faction felt threatened by this development. On the evening of 29 September, Lord Henry Ker (the son of the Earl of Roxburgh), rode into Edinburgh at the head of an armed retinue and challenged Hamilton to a duel, calling him a traitor. The episode ended without violence as Lord Ker backed down and apologised. However it set in motion murmurs and whispers amongst others Royalists which led to plotting.

The plot was directed against the Marquis of Argyll, the Marquis of Hamilton, and the latter's brother, the Earl of Lanark. It was hatched by the Royalist, and rival of Argyll, the Earl of Montrose, who had already attempted to have Argyll charged with high treason. The three were to be kidnapped and taken on board a ship at Leith, but on 11 October, General Leslie, the leader of the Covenanter army, was informed of the plot by Sir John Hurry, a Scottish soldier who had been invited to join the conspiracy. Argyll, Hamilton and Lanark were forced to flee from Edinburgh to Hamilton's property at Kinneil House, near Bo'ness. The next day, Charles denied any involvement in the plot, and was soon forced to allow an investigation into the matter.

Charles was left with no option but to submit to the Covenanters' demands. He assented to the abolition of episcopal polity in Scotland, and appointed Covenanting nobles to the Privy Council of Scotland and other positions, before returning to England in November to face the increasing threat of civil war.
