= James Maxwell, 1st Earl of Dirletoun =

17th-century Scottish aristocrat

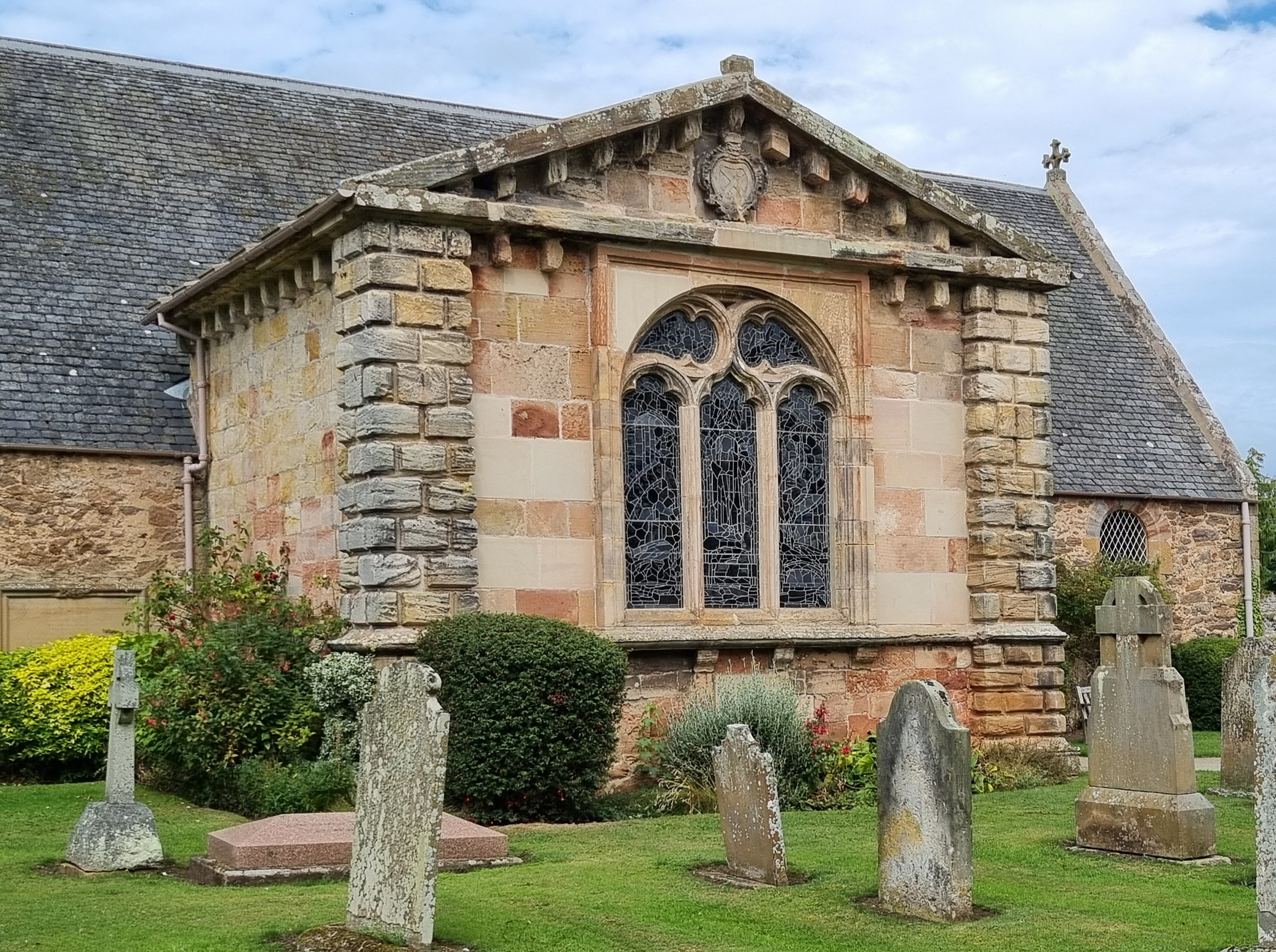
The aisle built by the Maxwells at Dirleton Kirk.

James Maxwell, 1st Earl of Dirletoun (died 1650) was a Scottish courtier active in England as a gentleman usher and Black Rod. He was involved in selling royal jewels.

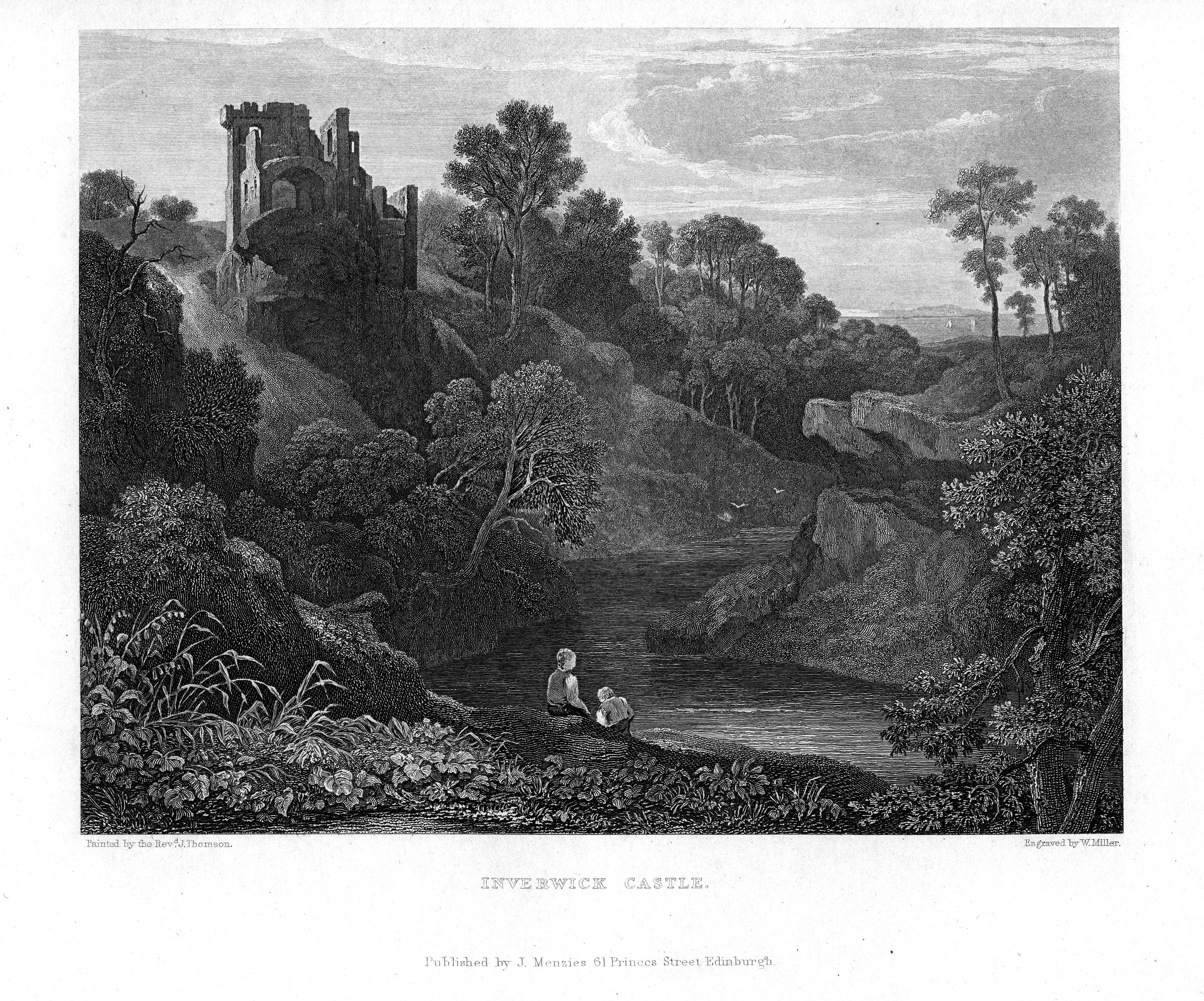
Innerwick Castle after Thomson of Duddingston

== James VI and I ==
Maxwell was the son of Robert Maxwell of Kirkhouse (d. 1583) and Nichola[s] Murray, a daughter of Charles Murray of Cockpool. His mother was a sister of John Murray of the bedchamber who became Earl of Annandale.

Maxwell was made an usher daily waiter in the household of King James in 1603. A younger brother, Robert Maxwell (d. 1627) was a sergeant-at-arms.

In June 1603, Maxwell was sent to Denmark with Roger Manners, 5th Earl of Rutland, to attend the christening of Christian, a son of Christian IV. Their interpreter was Thomas Ferrers. Maxwell brought a gift of £40 for the nurse and midwife. A record of names at an event in Denmark includes Inigo Jones.

In May 1609 James VI and I wrote to his advocate in Edinburgh Thomas Hamilton to favour the lawsuit of Sir Robert Douglas and Maxwell against the Lord Herries. On 15 June 1610, King James rewarded the usher with lands in Dumfries. Another Scottish servant, Matthew Hairstanes, received a similar grant on the same day.

Maxwell was appointed Black Rod in 1620 on the death of Sir Richard Coningsby in February 1620. The Black Rod officiated at the annual feast of the Order of the Garter at Windsor Castle and Maxwell was given a house there, and in 1629 he was made Keeper of the little park at Windsor.

James Maxwell injured the ear of barrister James (or Edward) Hawley at a masque or reception for the Duke of Bouillon at court in May 1612, when he dragged Hawley from a room by his ear string. This became a more serious affair after Hawley threatened to fight a duel, and his lawyer friends at the Inns of Court took his side, only resolved by the intervention of the king. Maxwell was required to make a formal apology to Hawley in the presence of the Earls of Suffolk, Northampton, and Worcester. He stumbled to repeat the "wordy" speech of satisfaction composed by the Earl of Northampton. There was adverse feeling in London against the Scots in the court of King James which this incident reflected, and subsequently there was discussion in 1620 if a Scot could be Black Rod. Maxwell found it difficult to be naturalized as a denizen of England until 1622.

Maxwell was in charge of arranging seating in the Banqueting House for various events and masques, and erecting stands in 1613 for a tournament of "running at the ring" and "to see the Footeball play". King James sent him to Heidelberg with presents for Elizabeth Stuart, Queen of Bohemia in May 1614.

In 1616 the Privy Council of Scotland enforced the eviction of several people from Maxwell's lands in Dumfries and Galloway. Maxwell was sent to prevent Henry Rich and Edward Villiers fighting a duel at Croydon in January 1619.

Maxwell became gentleman usher at Parliament, or Black Rod, in March 1620, following the death of Richard Coningsby. John Chamberlain wrote that there were "murmurings" against the appointment of a Scotsman to the post. A Charles Maxwell killed in a duel in February 1620 with Sir Robert Ker at Newmarket in a quarrel about the king's favourites Somerset and George Villiers, was probably a kinsman rather than his brother. James Maxwell attended King James and Prince Charles at Newmarket while they took statements from witnesses to the quarrel including John Stewart of Traquair.

In July 1622 Thomas Erskine, Earl of Kellie recommended him to the Earl of Mar writing that he was probably more useful to Mar than his kinsman John Murray, 1st Earl of Annandale. Previously Kellie had written how Maxwell had tried to get King Charles to read a letter from Mar, and would encourage Archibald Primrose to further Mar's business with the king. In Decemember, Maxwell was granted the lands in Kinnoull and the Gowrie Lodging in Perth.

== Charles I ==
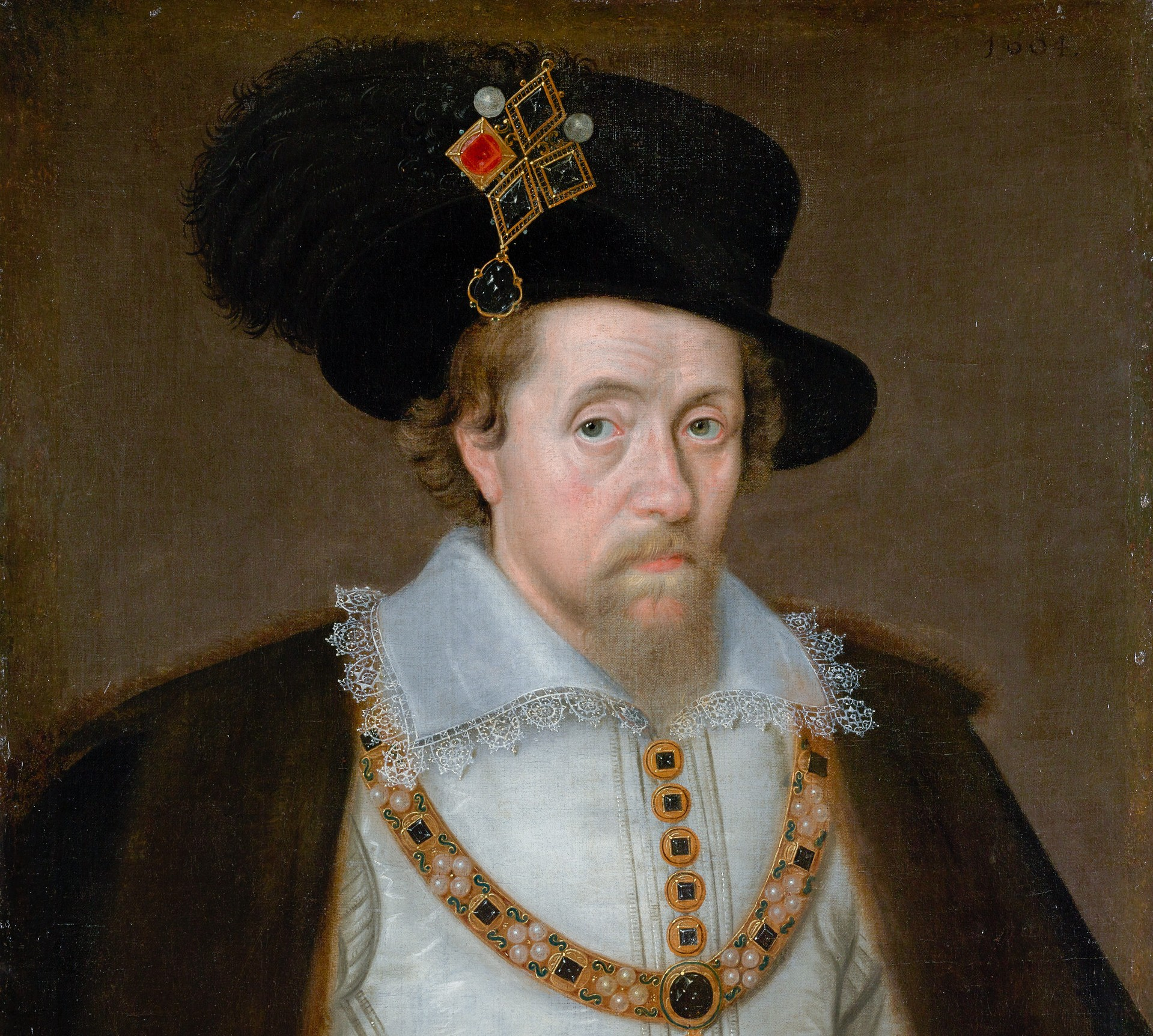
The "Mirror of Great Britain" on King James' hat

In 1625 he became a groom of the bedchamber to King Charles. As a gentleman in the king's household he was able to access the king and gain patronage for others. He acquired estates in England including, Wanborough Manor, Guildford Priory House, and Kidland Manor, and obtained patents for iron-making and pipe-clay. He also had a lodging or house at Windsor Castle, which was repaired in 1638.

In March 1630 Maxwell, by now wealthy, was involved in the sale of older crown jewels with Francis Cottington and acquired a number of pieces himself including the two pearls remaining from the Mirror of Great Britain and Anne of Denmark's gold circlet set with diamonds, emeralds, rubies and pearls, which had been made for her coronation in England by Spilman and Herrick. There was also a head attire with nine great round pearls.

Maxwell acquired Innerwick Castle in Scotland, and was known as "Maxwell of Innerwick". He bought the lordship of Dirleton and Dirleton Castle in 1631. In 1633, an Act of the Parliament of Scotland transferred the benefice of the parish church of Gullane to Dirleton, and Maxwell would be patron. Parliament also confirmed various property rights the Earl and his wife Elizabeth.

Maxwell acquired Guildford Priory House and park in 1641 from the Murrays. He had been keeper of the park (in reversion) since 1611.

He was made Earl of Dirletoun around 1646, though as in the case his courtier of William Murray, Earl of Dysart and Patrick Maule, Earl of Panmure, the process of granting and confirming these peerages is obscure.

James Maxwell died at Holyrood Palace on 19 April 1650, and was buried at Dirleton Kirk.

== Family ==
In 1619 Maxwell married Elizabeth de Boussy, or Bousson de Podolsko (d. 1659), from Antwerp, who had been Anne of Denmark's laundry woman and was the widow of William Ryder (d. 1617), a harbinger or clerk of the royal stables. She owned a miniature portrait of Anna of Denmark's brother, the Duke of Holstein, set with diamonds. The Royalist agent Jane Whorwood was her daughter from her marriage to Ryder.

Their daughter Diana Maxwell married Charles Cecil, Viscount Cranborne, and Elizabeth Maxwell married William Hamilton, 2nd Duke of Hamilton, then known as the Earl of Lanark. Elizabeth's dowry in 1639 was 288,000 Scottish merks.

Robert Maxwell, his brother, died in 1637 leaving an embroidered scarf and £50 for a gown to his niece Elizabeth, and a pair of embroidered slippers and £50 to Diana.

Peerage of Scotland
New creation	Earl of Dirletoun; 1646–1650	Extinct
Government offices
Preceded by Richard Coningsby and George Pollard	Black Rod; 1620–1646	Succeeded by (disputed)
