= Earl of Dirletoun =

Earl of Dirletoun (also Dirleton or Dirletun) was a title in the Peerage of Scotland. It was created in 1646 for James Maxwell by King Charles I. Lord Dirletoun's only male heir died in infancy, and the Earldom became extinct on his death. He had two daughters. The first, Lady Elizabeth, married William Hamilton, 2nd Duke of Hamilton then Thomas Dalmahoy, and the second, Lady Diana, married Charles Cecil, Viscount Cranborne.

== Earls of Dirletoun (1646) ==
- James Maxwell, 1st Earl of Dirletoun (b. before 1604)

== Arms ==
Arms: Argent, a Saltire Sable, a Bordure Gules, charged with eight Thistles leaved Or. Crest: a Stag proper, attired Argent, lodged before a Holly Bush proper.
