= George Haliburton (Lord Provost) =

Scottish merchant

George Haliburton (1685–1742) was an early 18th century Scottish merchant who served as Lord Provost of Edinburgh 1740 to 1742.

== Life ==
He was born at Muirhouse (or Muirhouselaw) north of Edinburgh in 1685, the son of Patrick Haliburton and Jane Erskine of Shielfield.

He was elected Dean of Guild in 1739 and Lord Provost of Edinburgh in 1740 and was succeeded by John Coutts in 1742.

He died on 3 September 1742 and was buried in Greyfriars Kirkyard.

After his death two of his shops at the foot of West Bow on the Grassmarket passed to John Hamilton, cordiner (shoemaker).

== Family ==
He was married to Elizabeth Rutherford, widow of his cousin, Thomas Rutherford. They had three daughters:.

- Helen
- Janet, married James Nicolson, minister of Banchory in 1741
- Davidona married William Dallas in 1756 and was mother to Lt General Thomas Dallas

A second marriage bore him two sons, John and David, the latter of whom inherited Muirhouselaw.
