= John Halliburton (priest) =

English priest and theologian

Robert John Halliburton (23 March 1935 – 26 September 2004) was an English priest and theologian within the Church of England, who served as a canon and Chancellor of St Paul's Cathedral between 1989 and 2003.

== Early life and ordination ==
Robert John Halliburton was born in March 1935 in Wimbledon, London, the son of Robert Halliburton and Katherine Margery Halliburton (née Robinson). He moved to Kent during the Second World War and was educated at Tonbridge School. He studied for a bachelor's degree at Selwyn College, Cambridge, reading modern languages for Part I of the Tripos but transferring to theology for Part II.

After graduating, he completed his obligatory eighteen months of national service. He then began simultaneously studying for a DPhil degree at Keble College, Oxford and preparing for ordination into the Church of England at St Stephen's House. He was ordained deacon 1961, and priest 1962. His doctoral thesis, for which he was supervised by Canon F. L. Cross, was entitled "Augustine and the Monastic Life". After a curacy at St Dunstan and All Saints, Stepney, he became first a tutor and then Vice-Principal at St Stephen's House, Oxford 1967–1973. He was Principal of Chichester Theological College from 1975 to 1982. He returned to parochial work in Twickenham before taking up the role of Chancellor at St Paul's Cathedral from 1989 to 2003.

== Personal life ==
Halliburton's interests included music and gardening, and he was a member of the Athenaeum Club.

Halliburton married Jennifer Ormsby Turner in 1968. Their marriage produced five children: two sons and three daughters.

He died in September 2004, survived by his wife and three of their children.
