= Lord Haliburton of Dirleton =

Scottish Lordship of Parliament

Lord Haliburton of Dirleton (or Dirletoun) was a Scottish Lordship of Parliament created circa. 1450 for Sir Walter de Haliburton, Lord High Treasurer of Scotland. The seat of Lord Haliburton was at Dirleton Castle in present-day East Lothian.

The last Haliburton of Direleton was Patrick, 6th Lord Haliburton, died c. 1506. His three daughters with Christine Wawane, Janet, Margaret and Mariotta were his heirs. Janet married William Ruthven, 2nd Lord Ruthven in 1515, who subsequently gained the Dirleton lordship.

== Lords Haliburton of Dirleton ==
- Walter de Haliburton, 1st Lord Haliburton of Dirleton (died c. 1447)
- John Haliburton, 2nd Lord Haliburton of Dirleton (died c. 1452–1454)
- Patrick Haliburton, 3rd Lord Haliburton of Dirleton (died c. 1459)
- George Haliburton, 4th Lord Haliburton of Dirleton (died c. 1492)
- James Haliburton, 5th Lord Haliburton of Dirleton (died c. 1502)
- Patrick Haliburton, 6th Lord Haliburton of Dirleton (died c. 1506)
- Janet Haliburton, 7th Lady Haliburton of Dirleton (died c. 1560)
  - de jure uxoris William Ruthven, Lord Ruthven and Dirleton
- Patrick Ruthven, 8th Lord Dirleton
- William Ruthven, 9th Lord Dirleton, attainted and executed 1584
