= Walter de Haliburton, 1st Lord Haliburton of Dirleton =

Scottish noble

Walter de Haliburton
- Lord Haliburton of Dirleton
- Arms of Walter Haliburton: Or, on a bend azure, three mascles or
- Died: c. 1449
- Spouses: Isobel Stewart; Marjorie Douglas
- Father: Sir John Haliburton of Dirleton
- Mother: Margaret Cameron

Sir Walter de Haliburton, 1st Lord Haliburton of Dirleton (died c. 1449), Lord High Treasurer of Scotland was a Scottish noble.

== Life ==
The eldest son of Sir John Haliburton of Dirleton (d. 1392), by his wife Margaret Cameron, daughter of Sir John Cameron, 7th Lord of Ballegarno. His sister Jean married Henry I Sinclair, Earl of Orkney. He succeeded to the Dirleton estate in East Lothian, upon the death of his father in 1392 and also inherited his uncle's estate of Haliburton in the early 15th century. Sir Walter was one of the hostages for King James I on 28 March 1424 and was exchanged and permitted to return to Scotland on 16 July 1425. He is named as one of the Scottish Commissioners to meet the English at Hawdenstank with 800 men to redress complaints, in a Safe-Conduct dated 24 January 1430 (1429/30).

In 1439 and 1440 he was appointed Lord High Treasurer of Scotland, and in the latter year was created a Lord of Parliament. He remained Lord High Treasurer until 1449, a post which he could not hold unless he was also a Privy Councillor.

== Marriage and issue ==
He married Lady Isobel, daughter of the Regent, Robert Stewart, Duke of Albany and wife Margaret Graham, Countess of Menteith, who was also the widow of Alexander Leslie, Earl of Ross (d. 1402). They had four sons:

- John Haliburton, 2nd Lord Haliburton of Dirleton
- Walter Haliburton of Pitcuor, who married Catherine, daughter and co-heiress of Alexander de Chisholm
- Robert Haliburton
- William Haliburton

He is also said to be the second husband of Marjorie Douglas, daughter of Archibald Douglas, 3rd Earl of Douglas and wife Joanna de Moravia, Lady of Bothwell.

== Citations ==
Peerage of Scotland
New creation	Lord Haliburton of Dirleton c. 1447–c. 1449	Succeeded by John Haliburton
