= George Haliburton, Lord Fodderance =

Scottish judge and Senator of the College of Justice

Sir George Haliburton, Lord Fodderance (c.1580–1649) was a 17th-century Scottish judge and Senator of the College of Justice.

== Life ==
He was a member of the family of Haliburton of Pitcur (near Coupar Angus) and his father owned a nearby estate at Fotherance (aka Fodderance). He studied law (probably at St Andrews University).

He was elected a Burgess of Dundee in 1625.

In November 1627 he was elected a Senator of the College of Justice in place of William Livingston, Lord Kilsyth. He took the title "Lord Fodderance".

In 1632 he purchased the Lauton estate in the parish of Cargill, Perthshire and Strabrok house near Linlithgow.

He was knighted by King Charles I of England in 1633 at Holyrood Palace and was in the same year placed on the Parliamentary Commission for Surveying of the Laws. In November 1642 he was appointed President of the Court of Session. In 1643 he presided over a dispute between Viscount Dudhope and the City of Dundee.

In 1646 he was witness at the baptism of his wife's niece, Helen Wedderburn, who later married John Dickson, Lord Hartree.

He died on 15 March 1649 and was replaced as a Senator in November 1649 by John Dickson, Lord Hartree.

Fodderdance was rebuilt as a Victorian mansion in the 19th century and renamed Lintrose House.

== Family ==
He first married the daughter of Sir Thomas Blair of Balthayock.

He then in March 1625 married Magdalene Wedderburn, widow and cousin of William Wedderburn (d.1616), daughter of Alexander Wedderburn of Kingennie, and also his second cousin. Following George's death she married her third husband: John Ogilvy of Lownan.
