= George Haliburton, 4th Lord Haliburton of Dirleton =

Scottish noble

George Haliburton, 4th Lord Haliburton of Dirleton (died before 1492), was a Scottish Lord of Parliament.

George was the son of John, 2nd Lord Haliburton and Margaret Hepburn, daughter of Patrick Hepburn of Dunsyre.

George Haliburton joined with his East Lothian neighbour and kinsman Patrick Hepburn, Lord Hailes, in the rebellion against James III of Scotland which culminated in the king's death at the battle of Sauchieburn in 1488.

In 1474, George resigned his title to his eldest son Archibald, who had married Helen 'Ellen' Schaw or Shaw, daughter of James Schaw of Sauchie, keeper of Stirling Castle. They were the parents of one son, James Halyburton. Archibald died at the battle of Sauchieburn, and his widow Helen 'Ellen' Shaw next married Sir Patrick Hume, the 2nd Baron Hume of Polwarth, and by him had additional issue.

As Archibald died before his father, his title reverted to George. Upon George's death, the title of Lord Halyburton passed to Archibald's son James, who died having left no heirs.

The title next passed to James's uncle, Patrick Haliburton, 6th Lord Haliburton of Dirleton, who was the last Lord Haliburton from the line of Sir John Halyburton, as Patrick left no male heirs.

Accordingly, the title passed to the heirs male descending from Walter Halyburton, the younger brother of John, 2nd Lord Halyburton.

George, Lord Haliburton's daughter Marion Haliburton married George Home of Ayton. In 1494 they disputed ownership of the barony of Bolton with Patrick Hepburn, Earl Bothwell, who had a tack or lease of Bolton from Archibald, Master of Haliburton.

Peerage of Scotland
Preceded by Patrick Haliburton	Lord Haliburton of Dirleton c. 1459–c. 1492	Succeeded by James Haliburton
