= John de Haliburton =

Scottish noble

- Died: 1355; Nesbitt Moor
- Spouse: Agatha de Vaux
- Father: Adam Haliburton
- Mother: Isobel

John de Haliburton (died 1355) was a Scottish noble.

== Life ==
The son of Adam Haliburton by his spouse Isobel. He inherited the Dirleton estate in East Lothian, upon his marriage to Agatha, the heiress of William de Vaux of Dirleton. He was killed in 1355 during the Battle of Nesbit Moor and was succeeded by his son John.
