= East Lothian Yacht Club =

Yacht club in the UK

The East Lothian Yacht Club or ELYC is based at the harbour in North Berwick, East Lothian, Scotland. It was founded in 1928 and moved from its temporary base at the Fishermans Hall to the current building in 1931, since which time various expansions and redevelopments have taken place. Some of the ELYC's buildings are now shared with the Scottish Seabird Centre. The interior of the club was completely remodelled in 2003.

The ELYC regularly hosts national and international yachting competitions. It is also accredited by the Royal Yachting Association for various training and safety programmes. The 2006 calendar included national championships in the Laser and Medina classifications.

In December 2005 the club was awarded £33,500 from SportScotland in recognition of its commitment to sailing and sail training. Several current and former members of the club compete at the highest levels of sailing, with several Olympic prospects.

Since 2006 ELYC (East Lothian Yacht Club) has been host to the following classes for their championships:

- Contender
- Enterprise
- International 14
- Laser 2000
- RS 200
- RS 400
- Solo
- Topper

== History ==
East Lothian Yacht Club was founded in 1928, initially renting the upstairs of the Fishermen's Hall as its base. In 1931 the club moved to its present location, an old granary built circa 1802, which it leased from the Hamilton Dalrymple family. This is a category B listed building. Later the club leased the lower store from the Town Council.

In 1990 the club bought the "watchhut" (formerly the Royal Observer Corps lookout post which had a direct phone link to the gunnery control at Inchkeith) and the lower store. This was followed in 1993 by the purchase of the old lifeboat store, next door to the lower store. In 1997 the club bought the clubhouse from Sir Hew Hamilton Dalrymple. An ambitious renovation project was planned, and after successfully raising the required finance, the project started in October 2002 and finished on time and to budget in May 2003.

Images of the members and some records relating to their activities are held by East Lothian Council Archives.

== Club boats ==
The Club has one Avon SR 4.7 RIB, and three Valiant DR490 RIBs (Rigid Inflatables) which act as rescue and coach boats, each with a Honda BF50 engine The club also owns:

- 12 Toppers
- 4 2000s

and 2 small tractors.

Club dinghies are available for club members to sail as long as they have reached RYA level 2 or the equivalent and there is a club rescue boat on the water.
