= Sula II =

Passenger boat

The "Sula II", commonly referred to as "Sula", is an open wooden passenger boat that carried visitors from North Berwick harbour in East Lothian, Scotland around the island bird colonies of Bass Rock, Fidra and Craigleith. The vessel was retired in the spring of 2019, and is now in Southampton. After opening the nearby Scottish Seabird Centre in 2000, The Prince of Wales (Prince Charles) enjoyed a tour around the islands on board Sula II, while famous naturalists including Sir David Attenborough and Terry Nutkins have boarded the boat. An estimated 8,000 tourists take a trip on Sula each year.

The name "Sula" comes from the Latin Sula bassanus, an old name for the northern gannet - tens of thousands of which inhabit the Bass Rock. The Marr family have owned and operated the boat since 1961.
