= North Berwick Harbour =

Harbour in North Berwick, Scotland

Coordinates: 56.061°N 2.718°W

The Harbour at North Berwick in East Lothian, Scotland, was originally a ferry port for pilgrims travelling to St Andrews in Fife. Today the water is home to leisure craft, a tourist launch and the remains of the fishing fleet that once dominated the area, while on dry land the Scottish Seabird Centre, East Lothian Yacht Club and Auld Kirk Green are the main attractions.

== History ==
The North Berwick Crest

The harbour was built around 1150, with the first documented record of its existence coming in 1177. In the early days there were ferry services to Earlsferry near Elie in Fife, with up to 10,000 pilgrims passing through the port every year. When North Berwick received the Royal Charter and became a Royal Burgh in 1373, the design of a ferryboat was incorporated into the town crest, which remains unchanged today. However, pilgrims gradually became few and far between and after over 500 years of operation the ferry services had disappeared by 1692.

The focus of the harbour then switched to commerce and fishing. The main exports in 1794 being wheat and barley (corn), and the main imports wood and iron. The harbour was deepened in 1804 and again in 1831 allowing large commercial craft to dock. The arrival of the railway in North Berwick lessened the need for freight to be shipped in but allowed local fishermen to send their catches to all parts of the UK and beyond. As a result, the number of fishing craft swelled from the two recorded at the end of the 17th century to thirty by 1881. At one point there were plans for the railway to extend all the way to the harbour, and for the harbour to be connected to the island of Craigleith by a long pier, but these plans were dropped and the harbour and railway have changed little since. Two shorter piers were built to accommodate larger craft and to allow others to dock when beaten by the tides, the first of which - The North Pier - lasted from 1811 until a huge storm finished it off in 1898. The Galloway Pier, opened in 1877, was initially busy but saw little or no traffic in the inter-war period and was eventually demolished in 1940 having fallen into disrepair. As larger ships no longer visit North Berwick there was no appetite to rebuild a large pier. A smaller, modern concrete pier exists in its place today.

The latter half of the 19th century also saw a boom in tourism, as wealthy families discovered North Berwick to be an ideal escape from the overcrowded cities. As well as Edinburgh, train services to North Berwick came direct from as far afield as London as people came to relax, walk, shoot and golf in the area. The outdoor swimming pool at the harbour was a focal point for galas and competitions, while visitors with an interest in nature were able to land on the island bird colonies of Bass Rock and Fidra.

== The Auld Kirk Green ==
The oldest remaining part of the harbour is the "Auld Kirk Green" or "Anchor Green", which lies on the opposite site of the original harbour island from the dock. St. Andrews Kirk (church) - which excavations have revealed was built on the foundations of an older church or pagan temple - was built in 1177 and used by pilgrims to pray for safe passage across the water. It later became the North Berwick Parish Church, which precipitated the construction of first a bridge and finally a causeway to the harbour island.

Legend has it that on Halloween 1590, Satan himself attended a coven on the Auld Kirk Green, although a more earthly version of the tale records that Satan was "played" by Francis Stewart, 5th Earl of Bothwell. Stuart was a pretender to the throne and was apparently attempting to incite a storm which would sink the boat carrying James VI back from Norway with his new bride. In any case, this event so angered James VI that it triggered the North Berwick Witch Trials and the witch hunts that would eventually sweep the length and breadth of Britain. Those known to have participated in rituals at North Berwick are said to have died during the subsequent investigations, most likely at the hands of their "investigators".

The church ceased to host services and funerals in 1673, although part of one original wall remained standing until 1845. The area has been excavated several times, most recently when the adjacent ground was being prepared for the building of the Scottish Seabird Centre, and finds have included Roman coins and Viking artefacts. Digs have also unearthed well preserved skeletal remains, including those of children and murder victims, and metal pilgrims badges in the form of St. Andrew during crucifixion.

St. Andrews Kirk was restored in 2005 as a tourist attraction after receiving a £50,000 grant from the National Lottery Fund. Visitors can learn more about the history of the Auld Kirk Green, from its beginnings in the 7th century, through pilgrim times and the mysteries of the witches, right up to the present day.

== Modern day ==
Although the red sandstone harbour and buildings have changed little in their external appearance, the old granary is now home to modern flats and the interior of many others have been remodelled for housing, boat storage or office space. The Scottish Seabird Centre has become a major tourist attraction since opening in 2000 and tourists can still take Sula II to see the gannets, puffins and other birdlife in the area. The outdoor swimming pool finally closed in 1996. It has since been filled in and is now a dinghy park, although some of the original buildings and viewing galleries still remain intact.

The East Lothian Yacht Club is an accredited centre of sailing and sail training excellence and hosts national and international yachting and boating events from the harbour. The racing and cruising yachts of ELYC members now make up the bulk of vessels in the harbour, with a fishing fleet of just 3 for company. Just up the road along the old causeway from the harbour is the RNLI Lifeboat station, with one of the famous Blue Peter lifeboats always on call.

== Sources and notes ==
- Original "Witch Trial" accounts. Selected quote; "Sindrie of the witches confessed they had sindrie times companie with the devill at the kirk of Northberwick, where he appeared to them in the likeness of a man with a redde cappe, and a rumpe at his taill."
- https://books.google.com/books?id=OEBKAAAAYAAJ&q=%22agriculture+and+rural+economy+of+east+lothian%22 General View of the Agricultural and Rural Economy in East Lothian (1794). See especially top of page 27.
