= North Berwick Town House =

Judicial building in Elgin, Scotland

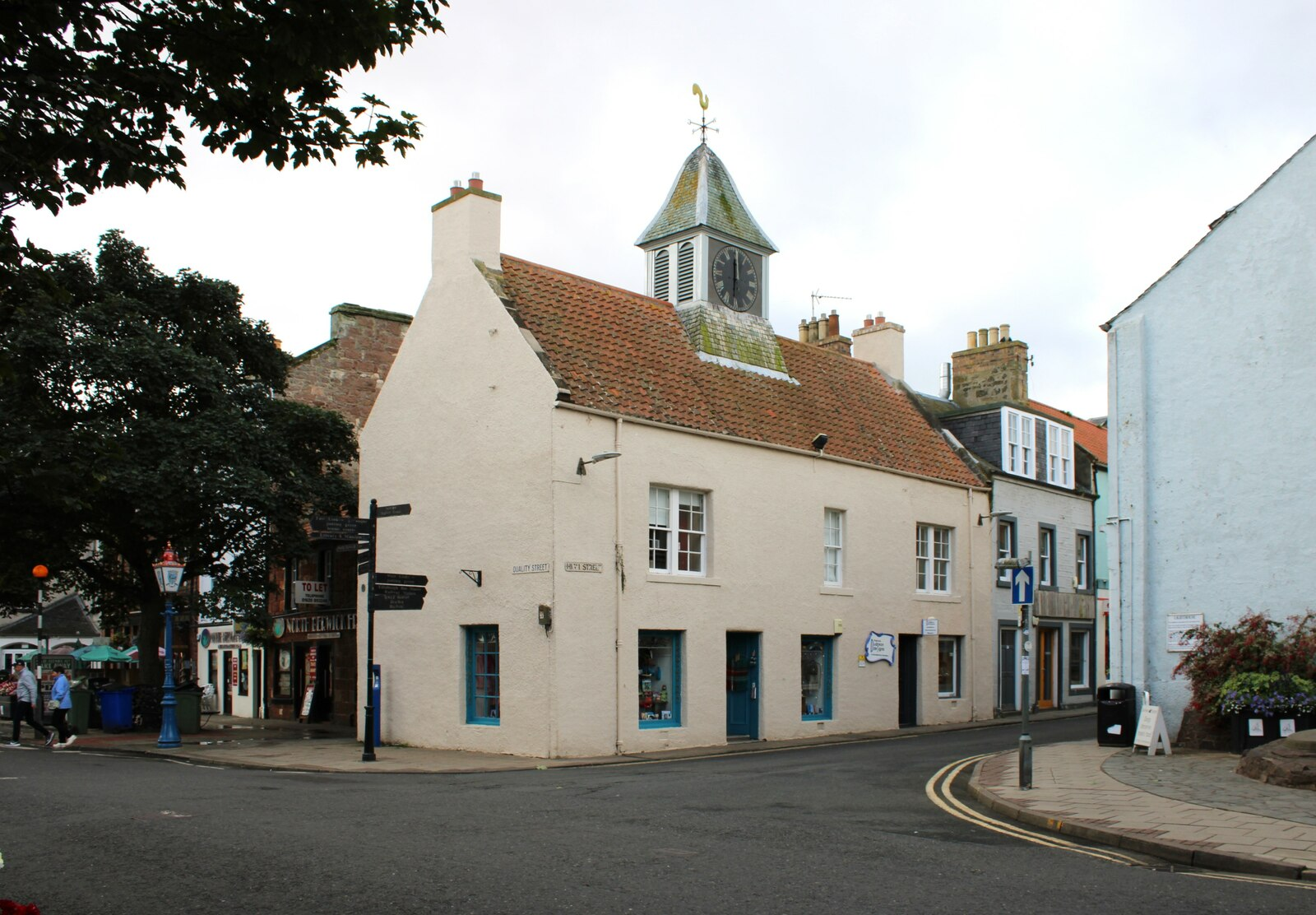
- The building in 2023

- Shown within East Lothian
- 56.0586°N 2.7173°W
- Location: High Street, North Berwick

History
- Built: 1724

Site notes
- Architectural style: Scottish medieval style

Listed Building – Category B
- Official name: 1, High Street, Council Chambers
- Designated: 5 February 1971
- Reference no.: LB38731

North Berwick Town House is a municipal building in the High Street in North Berwick in East Lothian, Scotland. The building, which is now used for retail purposes as a bookshop at one end and as a jewellery business at the other end, is a Category B listed building.

== History ==
The first municipal building in North Berwick was a tolbooth at the east end of the High Street, on the corner with Quality Street, dating back to the mid-16th century. By the early 18th century, the old tolbooth was dilapidated and the burgh officials decided to demolish the old tolbooth and to erect a new building on the same site.

The new building was designed in the Scottish medieval style and built by local masons, Archibald and John Brouns, and a mason from The Heugh on Lindisfarne, Patrick Forgan. It was constructed in coursed stone with a harled finish, and was completed in 1724. The design involved an asymmetrical main frontage facing onto the High Street. There were at least two openings on the ground floor and three windows on the first floor. There was an external staircase at the back and, at roof level, there was a large square bellcote with a weather vane. Internally, the principal rooms were a prison cell at the west end on the ground floor, a debtor's cell at the west end on the first floor and a council chamber at the east end on the first floor.

A bell was installed in the bellcote at the expense of the Scottish writer and local laird, Sir James Dalrymple, 1st Baronet, on completion of the building. A clock made by Roger Parkinson of Richmond, North Yorkshire was installed in 1735 and replaced at the expense of a member of parliament, Sir Hew Dalrymple-Hamilton, 4th Baronet in 1810. In the late 18th century, the council chamber was made available for visiting companies of actors and, in the 19th century, the former debtor's cell was used as a library. In 1970, the building was refurbished, with the fireplaces being taken out.

The building continued to serve as the meeting place of the burgh council for much of the 20th century but ceased to be the local seat of government when the enlarged East Lothian Council was formed in 1975. The interior was subsequently converted for retail use. The east end of the building was later used as a bookshop, while the west end became the home of a contemporary jewellery business.

== See also ==
- List of listed buildings in North Berwick, East Lothian
