= North Berwick Castle =

Former castle in Scotland

Coordinates: 56.0573°N 2.7071°W

- North Berwick, East Lothian, Scotland

Site information
- Condition: Ruined

Location

North Berwick Castle was a castle on motte, originating in the 13th-century, east of North Berwick, East Lothian, Scotland, just south of the Firth of Forth.

== History ==
The property belonged to the MacDuff Earls of Fife, who had a ferry between Earlsferry and North Berwick and held the barony of North Berwick. However one view is that the castle was built by the de Vaux family.

The castle was occupied during 1298 by Bishop Antony Bek. In 1314, the castle was occupied by the troops of the Earl of Pembroke, while in the ownership of the MacDuffs. These troops fled after the battle of Bannockburn in 1314. The castle was probably slighted by James Douglas, Lord of Douglas, the ‘Black Douglas’.

The Stewart Earls of Fife held the barony of North Berwick during the reign of Robert II of Scotland. The Lauders built a stone tower with a barmkin here towards the end of the 14th century, but it was abandoned soon after, the stone possibly being used by the Lauders in constructing the castle of the Bass. However it did provide temporary refuge for the future James I of Scotland. William Douglas, 2nd Earl of Angus may have slighted the castle thereafter.

== Reports on the Site ==
The Royal Commission on the Ancient and Historical Monuments of Scotland report at 1960 showed, “On the East Links, North Berwick, is Castle Hill, a natural mound about 40 feet in height. The summit is roughly pearshaped and measures in diameter 36 by 30 yards. To the south is a bank to which the mound is attached by a narrow neck. There is no trace of a ditch at base or across the neck. There are mounds and traces of stonework on the summit probably relics of an early stone castle.”

A field visit in 1962 showed, “The site of this castle is generally as described above. On the summit are the remains of an earth-and-stone bank, probably the remains of a turf-covered wall, enclosing an area measuring c.32.0 metres north to south by c.36.0 metres along the north wall. This bank is 1.0 metre high externally and 0.1 to 0.2 metres internally. But it reported that a ditch, 4.0 to 8.0 metres wide and 1.0 to 1.5 metres deep, cuts across the neck of land 12.0 metres south of the site, and spreads down both sides.

The 1981 report said, “A maze of truths, baked and half-baked, appear to surround the castle of North Berwick. Very few hard facts emerge about the fortress. Local opinion maintains that the site of the castle is marked by a green knoll overlooking the East Links, and that 'this eminence was probably of a wooden palisade type”. A filed visit in 1996 led to the report, “The site of the castle is generally as described in 1962. It is a possibly natural mound with an earth and stone bank around its summit. It was thought to be the original castle of the De Vaux”.

There was a desk-based assessment in 2001, which concluded, “The site of the castle is generally as described in 1962. It is a possibly natural mound with an earth and stone bank around its summit. It was thought to be the original castle of the De Vaux”. In July 2006 AOC Archaeology Group carried out an archaeological watching brief in July 2006 during ground-breaking works associated with the laying of an electricity cable to Glen Golf Club clubhouse, North Berwick. Work was undertaken within the vicinity of Castle Hill but no significant archaeological features or artefacts were encountered.

In 2007 Archaeological monitoring was undertaken during the laying of a gas main in the open ground parallel to the south side of the dwellings fronting onto Marine Terrace on the North Berwick seafront. The ground in Marine Park was found to have been levelled in relatively recent times. For most of the length of the trench windblown sand deposits were encountered, and no early finds. No evidence for earthworks or a ditch was identified at the E end of the trench, in the vicinity of the castle mound.

A surveyed was undertaken in August 2013. The castle was held by three noble families, the MacDuffs, the Stewarts and the Lauders. The 13th-century 'castle' was a wooden motte and bailey built by the MacDuffs, Thanes of Fife. A substantial higher resistance anomaly 17 x 4.7m was noted to the north west of the survey area, possibly representing wall foundations. A further area of the East Links adjacent to Castle Hill was surveyed but nothing of note was detected.

An open access dig, to the west of the Castle Hill outwith the scheduled area, showed a depth of sand deposits with several bands of soil growth and blown sand with one event at c0.8m which contained a large number of ‘live’ shells transported to this location by a large storm. The inclusion of two corroded nails and a small fragment of Scottish Red Ware ceramic suggest the date of 1656, when a large storm hit North Berwick. A geophysical survey of the Castle Hill showed a large retaining wall and other internal features, while an enhanced topographic survey showed areas of continued erosion, reflecting the impact of public access.

== See also ==
- Castles in Great Britain and Ireland
- List of castles in Scotland
