= 2000 (dinghy) =

Type of sailing boat

Development
- Designer: Phil Morrison
- Year: 1997
- Name: 2000

Boat
- Crew: 2

Hull
- Type: Monohull
- Construction: GRP
- LOA: 4.44 metres (14.6 ft)
- Beam: 1.77 metres (5.8 ft)

Rig
- Mast height: 6.27 metres (20.6 ft)

Sails
- Mainsail area: 8.66 square metres (93.2 sq ft)
- Jib/genoa area: 3.04 square metres (32.7 sq ft)
- Spinnaker area: 10.12 square metres (108.9 sq ft)

Racing
- D-PN: 92.5
- RYA PN: 1114

The 2000 (formerly the Laser 2000) is a performance sailing dinghy designed by Phil Morrison and currently sold by RS Sailing. It combines a traditional GRP hull and foam sandwich deck moulding with a modern asymmetric rig including a furling jib, reefing mainsail and single line gennaker hoist system.

A high boom provides plenty of headroom whilst the self-draining cockpit keeps the crew dry and drains quickly should the boat capsize.

Since its introduction in 1998 more than 2,200 boats have been built.

== History ==
The 2000 was commissioned by Performance Sailcraft and designed by Phil Morrison in 1997 and launched in 1998.

== Construction ==
The hull is built from glass-reinforced plastic foam sandwich and the spars from aluminium. The hull has been made in a range of colours but so far the deck moulding and hull below waterline have always been Vela Grey. The most common topsides are Purple, Navy Blue and Race Blue, but examples of Yellow, Charcoal Grey and Vela Grey (generally known as 'White') boats can also be found.

== Features ==
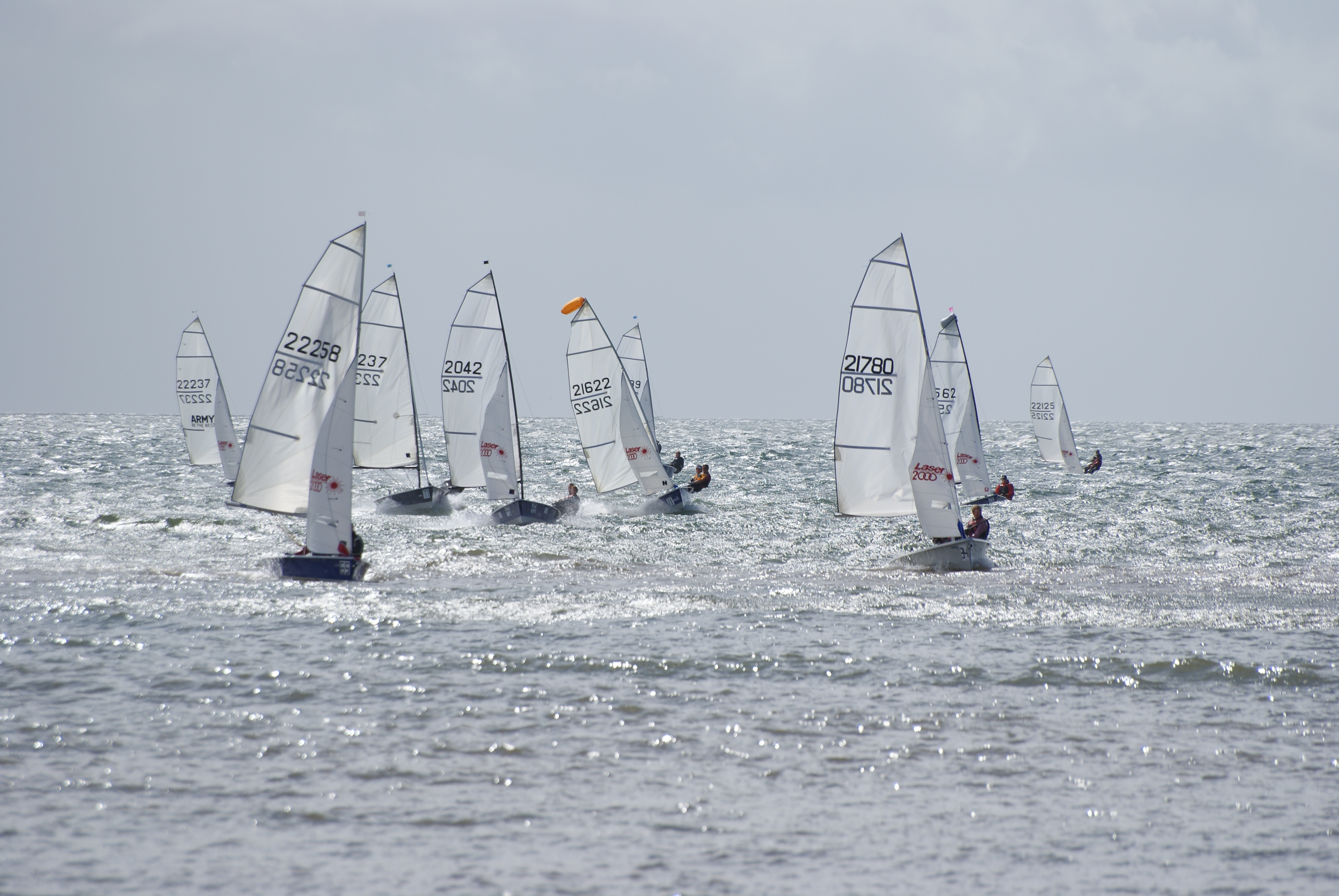
Laser 2000 Nationals at Sidmouth Sailing Club

The 2000 hosts a number of convenience and family-oriented features:

- Single-line hoist system for the gennaker
- Furling jib allows easy storage of jib for downwind sailing and single-handed operation
- Configurable for single- or double-handed sailing
- Foam sandwich hull construction uses glass-reinforced plastics to save weight and increase buoyancy over plywood & fiberglass construction
- Large cockpit allows for up to four passengers, suitable for competitive or pleasure sailing
- A single trapeze system, with lower shrouds, is available, though this must be removed for events run under the class rules.

== Identification ==
On pre-2013 boats, a red Laser 2000 logo is printed on the jib.

Sail numbers are situated on the main and numbering started at 2000. Issued numbers range 2000-2999 and 21000 onwards.
