= North Berwick =

Town in East Lothian, Scotland

Coordinates: 56.058°N 2.717°W

North Berwick: Scottish Gaelic: Bearaig-a-Tuath
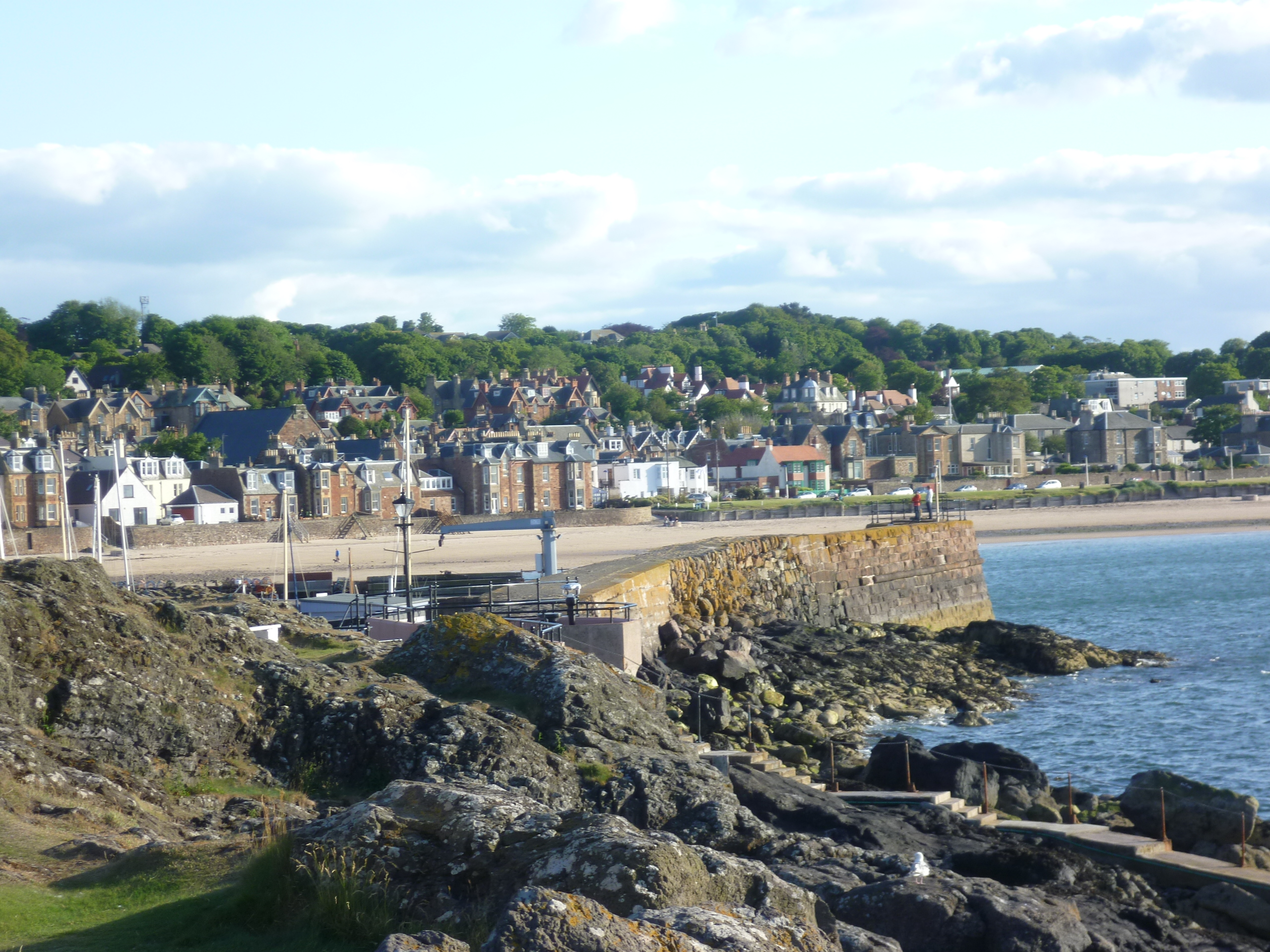
- West Bay from the harbour

- Location within Scotland
- Population: 7,840 (2020)
- OS grid reference: NT553852
  - Edinburgh: 20 mi (32 km)
  - London: 332 mi (534 km)
- Council area: East Lothian Council
- Lieutenancy area: East Lothian
- Country: Scotland
- Sovereign state: United Kingdom
- Post town: North Berwick
- Postcode district: EH39
- Dialling code: 01620
- Police: Scotland
- Fire: Scottish
- Ambulance: Scottish
- UK Parliament: Lothian East
- Scottish Parliament: East Lothian

North Berwick (/ˈbɛrɪk/; BEH-rik; Scottish Gaelic: Bearaig a Tuath) is a seaside town and former royal burgh in East Lothian, Scotland. It is situated on the south shore of the Firth of Forth, approximately 20 miles (32 km) east-northeast of Edinburgh. North Berwick became a fashionable holiday resort in the nineteenth century because of its two sandy bays, the East (or Milsey) Bay and the West Bay, and continues to attract holidaymakers. Golf courses at the ends of each bay are open to visitors.

== Name ==
The name Berwick means "barley farmstead" (bere in Old English means "barley" and wic means "farmstead"). Alternatively, like other place names in Scotland ending in 'wick', this word means 'bay' (Old Norse: vík). The word North was applied to distinguish this Berwick from Berwick-upon-Tweed, which throughout the Middle Ages the Scots called South Berwick. It was recorded as Northberwyk in 1250.

== Prehistory and archaeology ==
On the south side of North Berwick Law, there is evidence of at least 18 hut circles, rich middens and a field system dating from 2,000 years ago. There have been numerous archaeological excavations in the town that have uncovered evidence of North Berwick's medieval and modern remains. One such excavation found evidence of pre-medieval occupation of the area in the form of several Iron Age Cist burials.

One of the largest excavations occurred when many of the water mains in the town were replaced in the 2000s and archaeologists monitored the work. These excavations found the first evidence of the city walls: all towns of Scotland on the east coast were required by an Act of Parliament (1503) to build walls, but until then there was no evidence that they were ever built. It also found that the High Street was the main street in the medieval burgh, rather than in Quality Street, which had been hypothesised.

== History ==
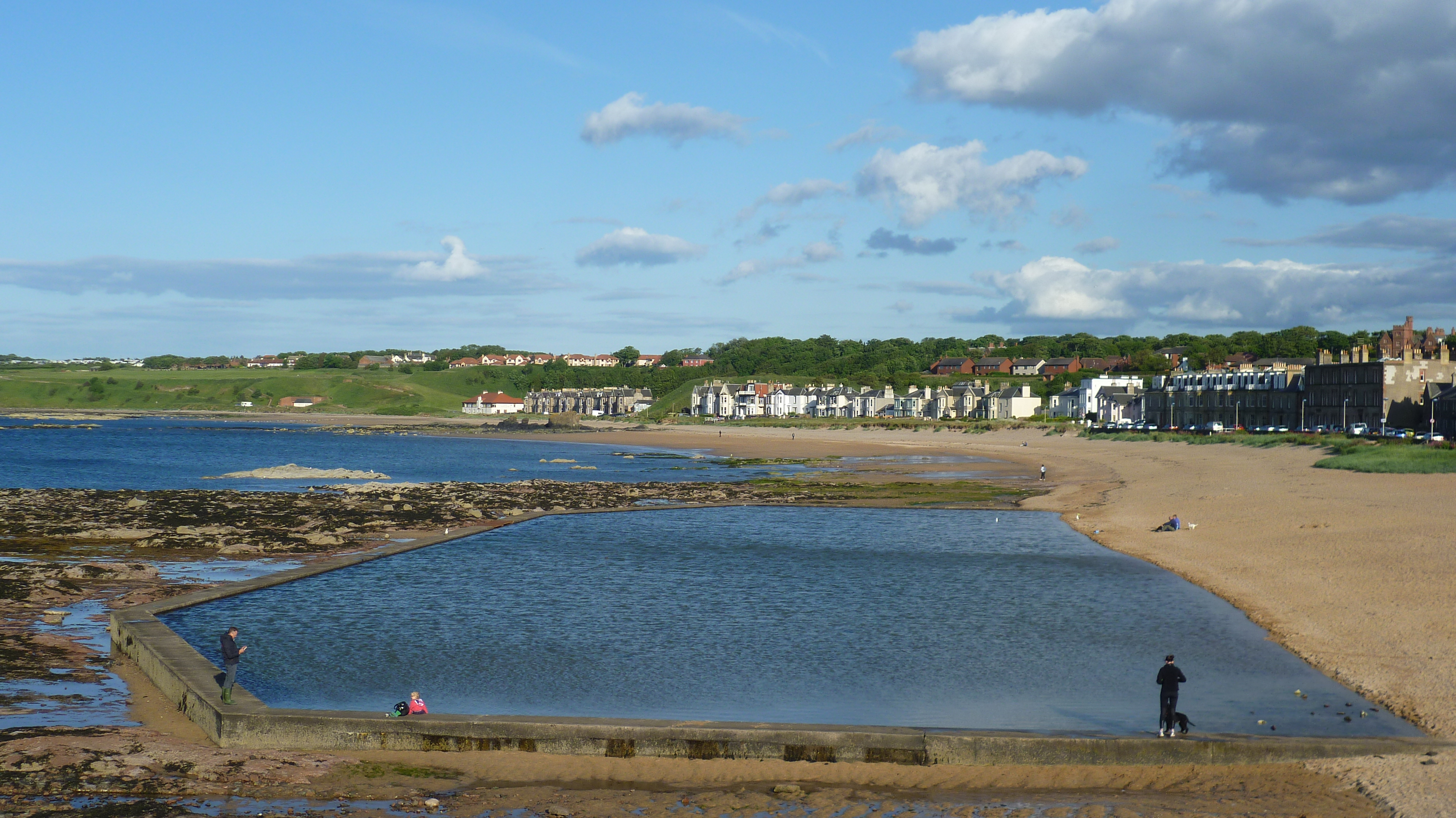
North Berwick East Bay

=== Medieval ===
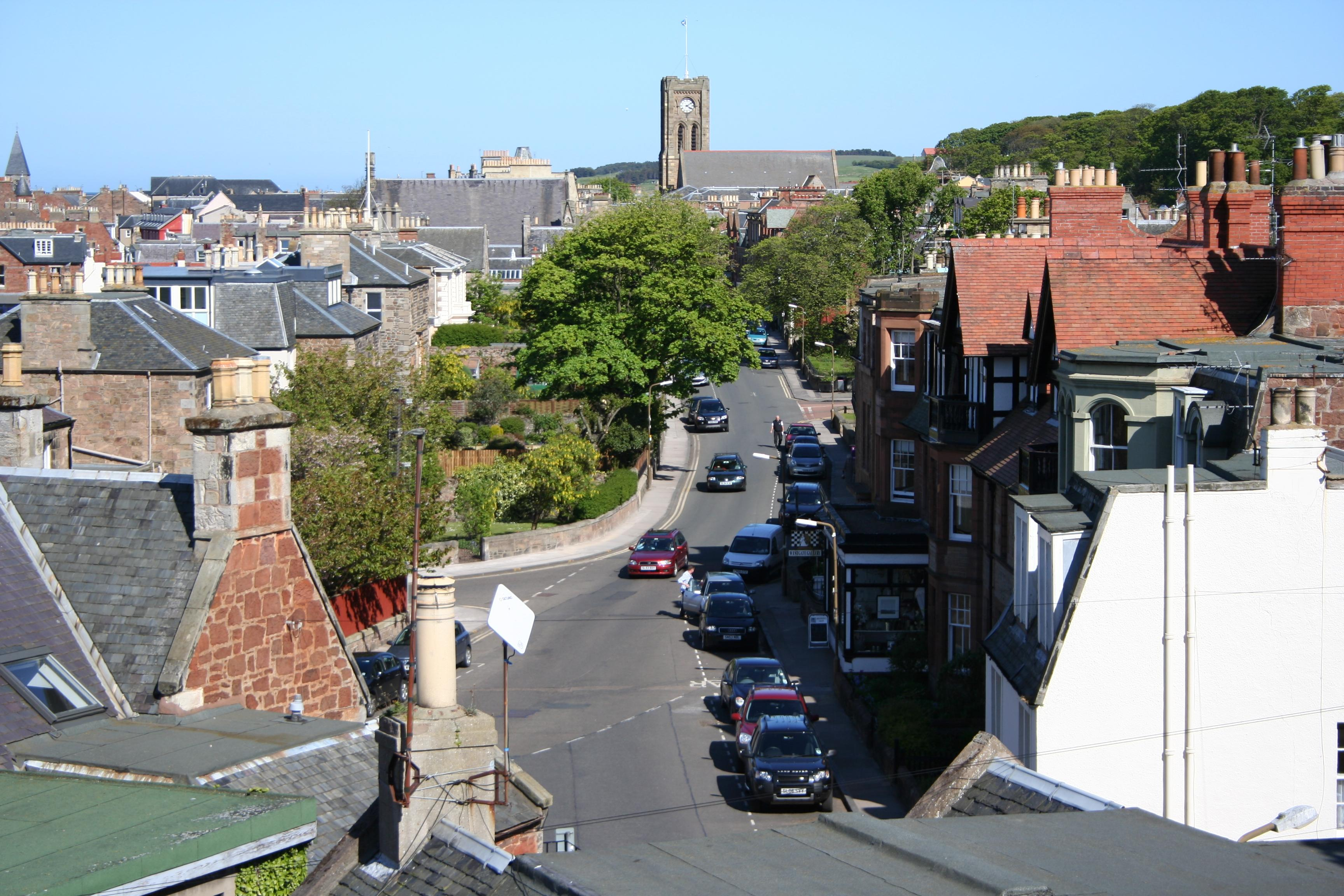
A view east towards the town centre

Excavations have shown that from as early as the eighth century, a ferry crossing to Earlsferry, near Elie in Fife was in existence, serving pilgrims on their way to the shrine of Saint Andrew. North Berwick Harbour was built in the twelfth century to meet the demands made of the existing ferry trade. This ferry was recently reinstated; during the summer, a boat travels between North Berwick and Anstruther in Fife, in homage to the original ferry.

Around 1150, Duncan, Earl of Fife of the Clan MacDuff founded an influential Cistercian nunnery (whose power continued until the Scottish Reformation, and its dissolution in 1588). Duncan's family shortly afterwards, at the start of the thirteenth century built North Berwick Castle erecting a wooden motte and bailey on the site of what is now Castle Hill in the east end of the town, at the start of Tantallon Terrace. This castle was attacked and held by the Earl of Pembroke around 1306; the English abandoned it by 1314, during the aftermath of the Battle of Bannockburn. Late in the fourteenth century the Lauder family (owners of the Bass Rock castle) erected a stone tower with a barmkin on the site; however they had abandoned it by 1420 in favour of the Bass, possibly as a result of conflict with the owners of nearby Tantallon Castle.

In the fourteenth century, the town became a baronial burgh under William Douglas, 1st Earl of Douglas, who then built nearby Tantallon Castle to consolidate his power.

=== Post-medieval ===
Later, during the fifteenth century, the town became a royal burgh in the reign of James I of Scotland.

The "Auld Kirk Green" at the harbour was allegedly used for gatherings by the accused in the North Berwick Witch Trials (1590–92). Legend has it that Satan himself attended a ritual there in 1590. During the sixteenth century, at least 70 people were implicated in the Witch Trials, and the events inspired works such as Burns' "Tam o' Shanter" and "The Thirteenth Member" by Mollie Hunter. One of the most famous witch trials at North Berwick was that of Agnes Sampson. She was accused of making a potion to create rough storms in the North Sea as King James VI was sailing home from Denmark with his new wife, Anne of Denmark. The trial took place in 1591, attended by King James. Agnes Sampson was tortured to confess, and then burnt at the stake, like many other innocent people.

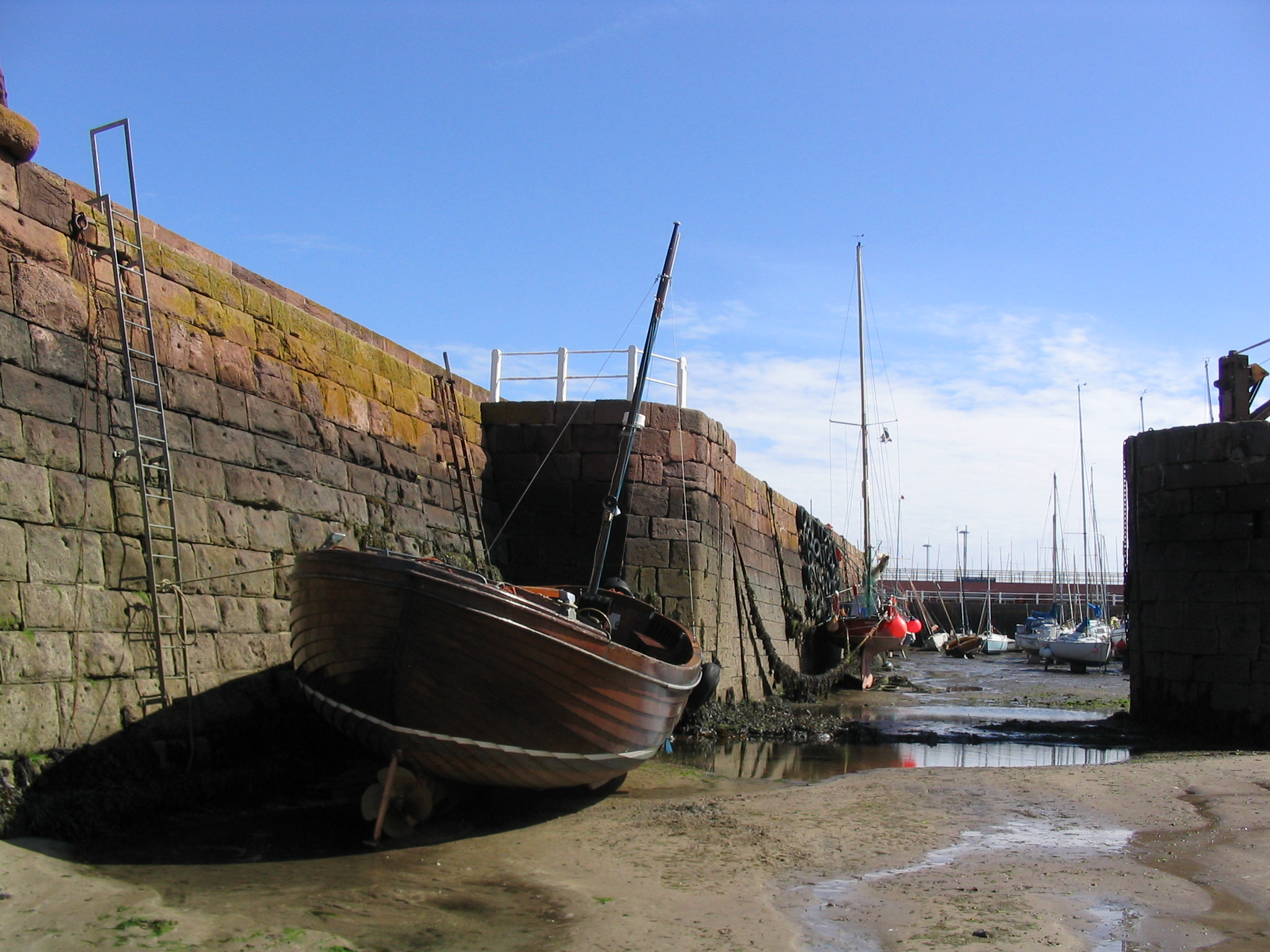
Harbour at low tide

=== Whaling in the eighteenth century ===
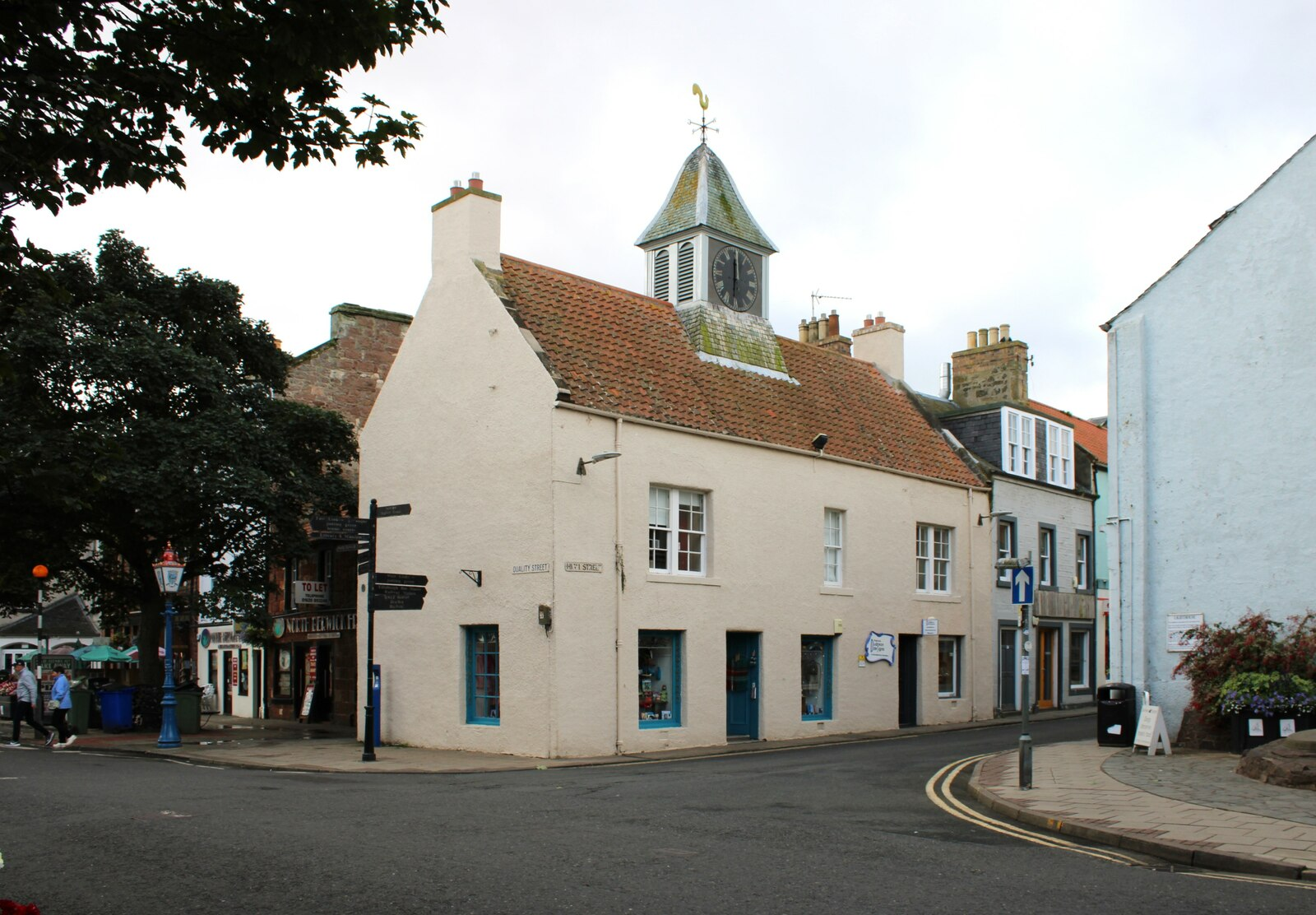
North Berwick Town House

Local lore, place names, and the jawbone arch first erected atop the Law in 1709, suggest that the port was involved in the whaling industry, though there is little written evidence to prove it. If so, it would have been a minor participant in the industry, overshadowed by nearby Leith. Certainly, whales have washed ashore at North Berwick over the years, even in recent times. The North Berwick Town House was erected in the High Street in 1724.

=== Industrial and modern ===
Despite the railway arriving in 1850, the Industrial Revolution bypassed the town. The late-nineteenth century saw North Berwick develop golfing and holiday facilities. The town soon became popular as a home for Edinburgh commuters and retirees.

Reporting on North Berwick in 1913, the Annual Report of the Fishery Board states: "Only a few crews are employed at fishing, and the catches are usually small, but comparatively, this was one of their most successful years."". Fishing in smaller ports such as North Berwick declined in the early years of the 20th Century as the industry became more capital-intensive.

Fishery Statistics

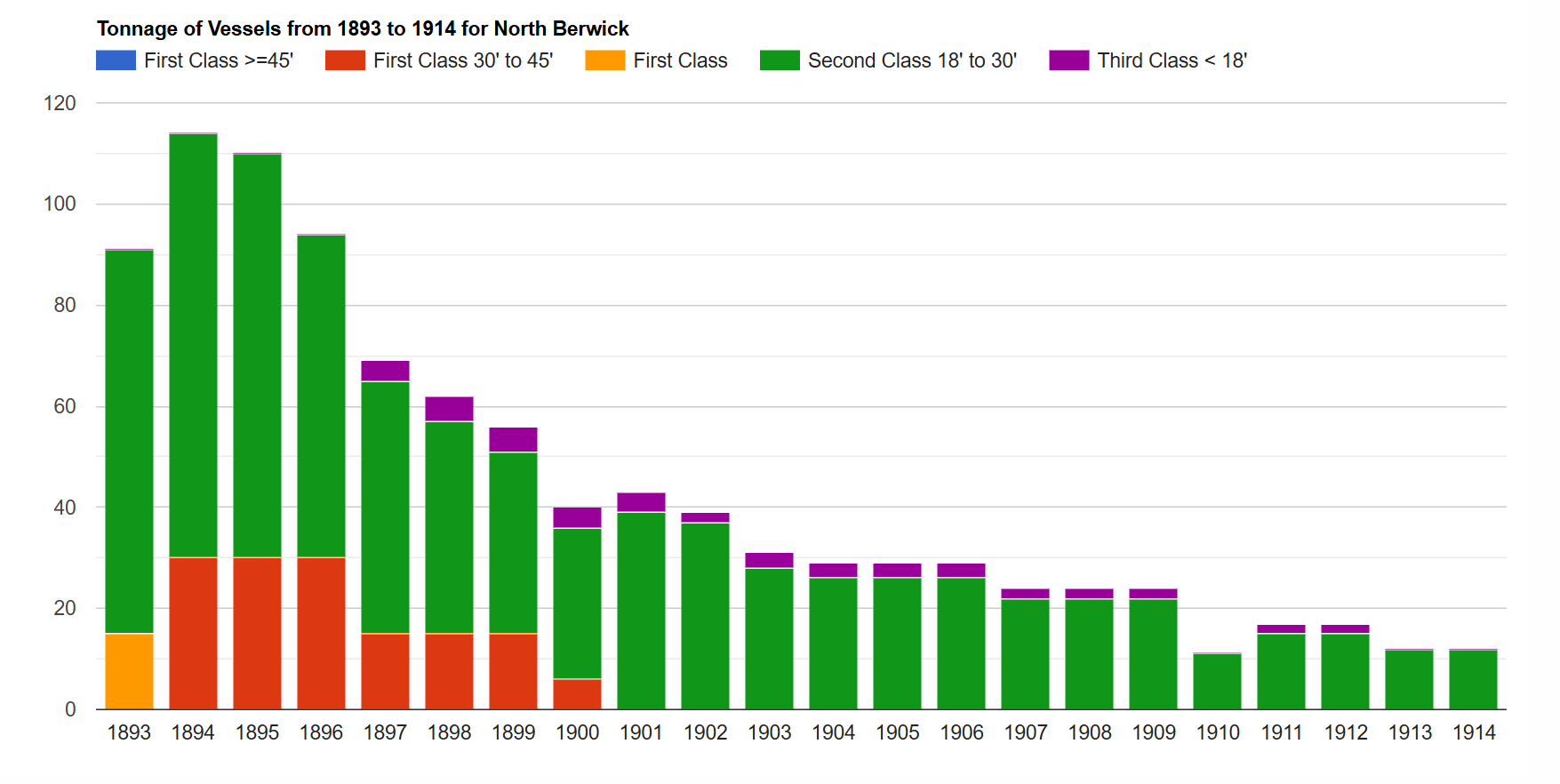
Tonnage of vessels

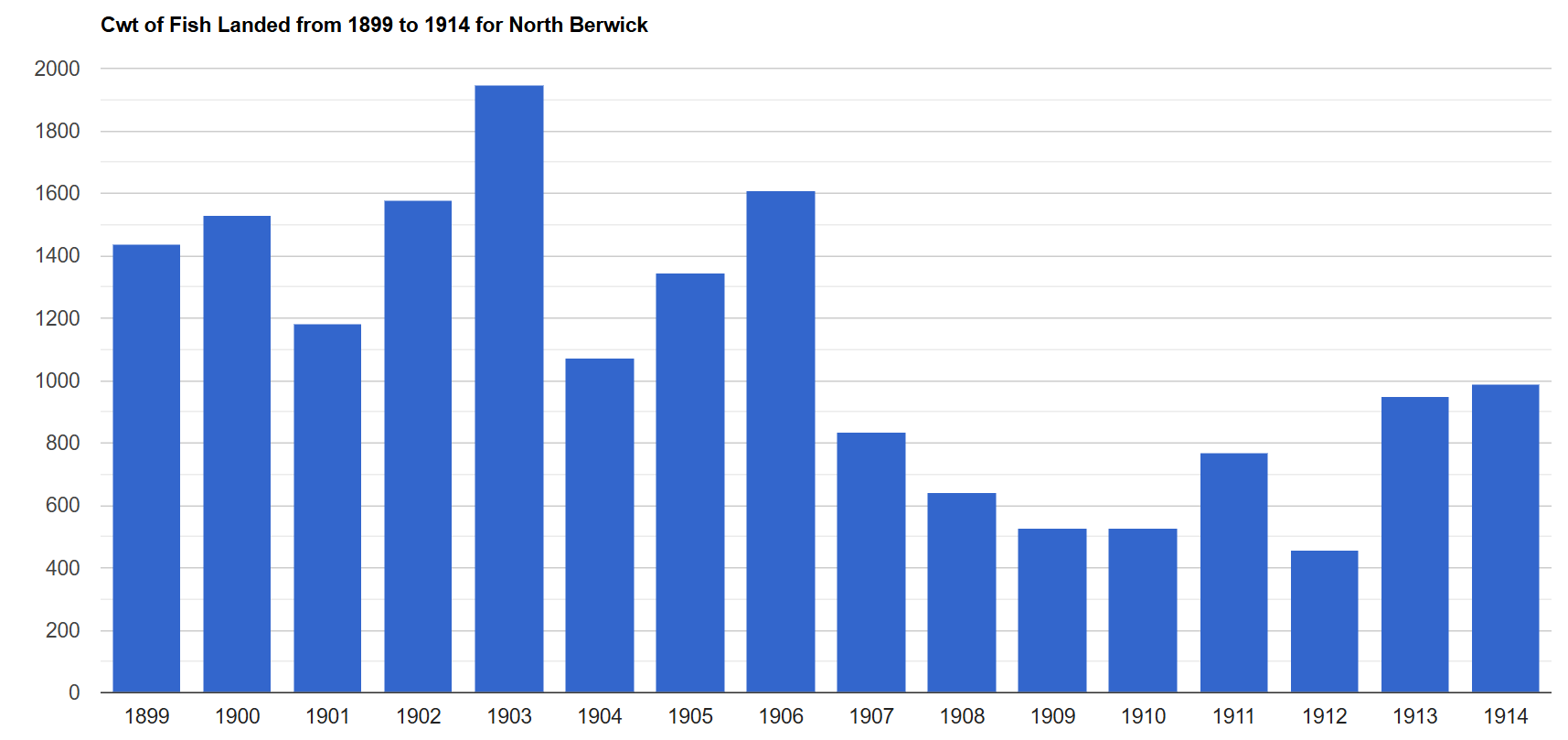
Cwt of fish landed

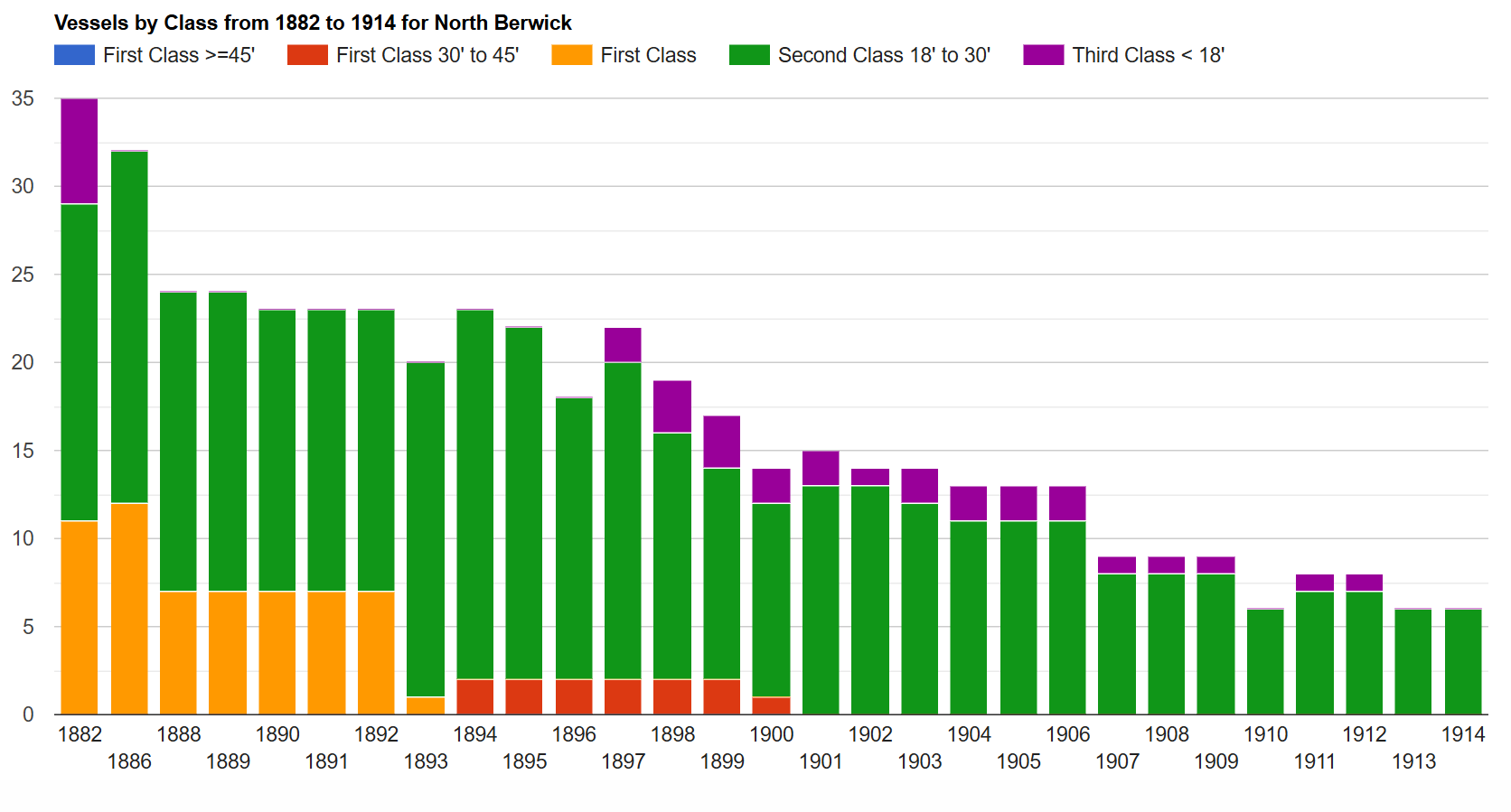
Vessels by class

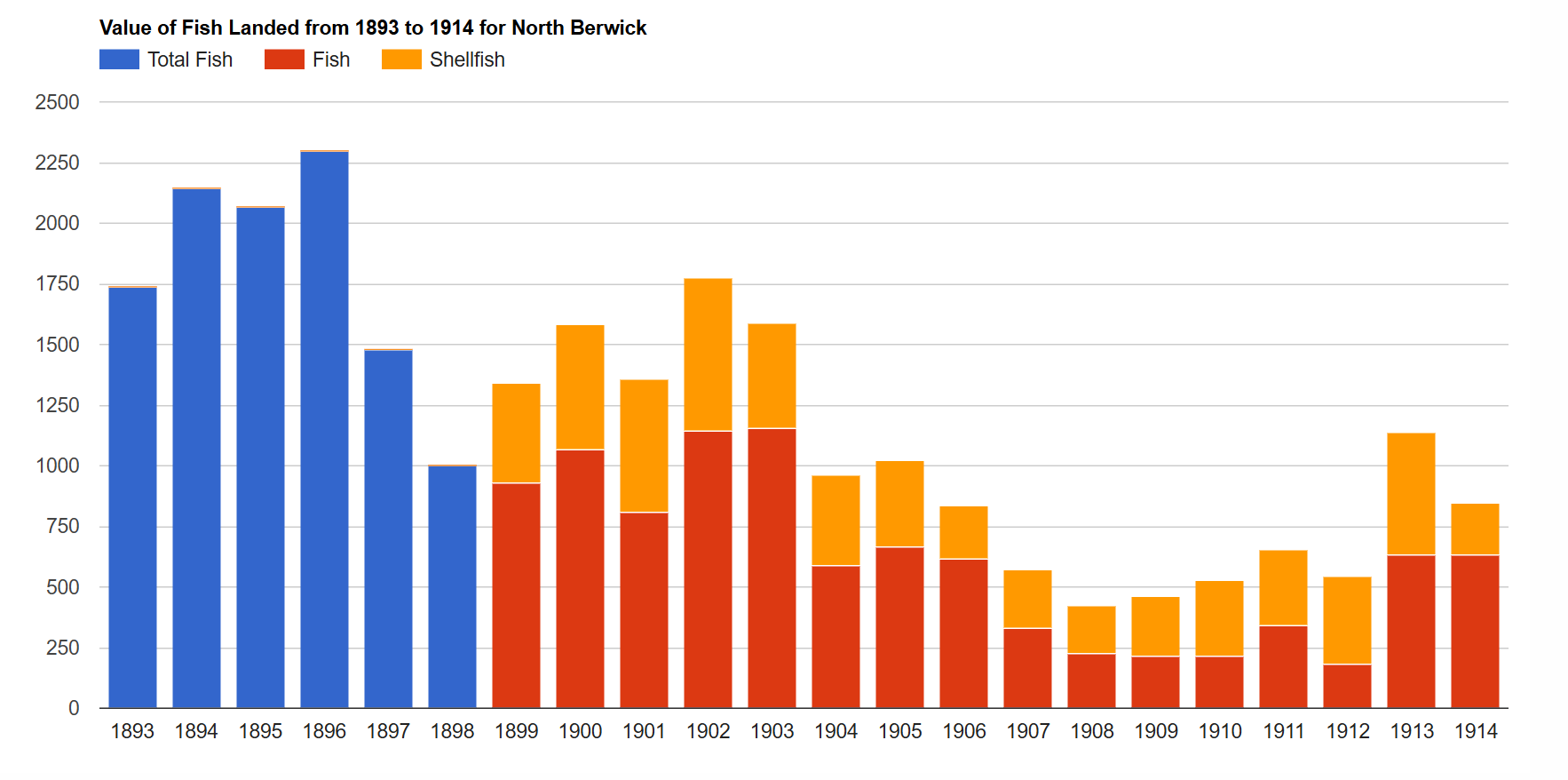
Value (£) of fish landed

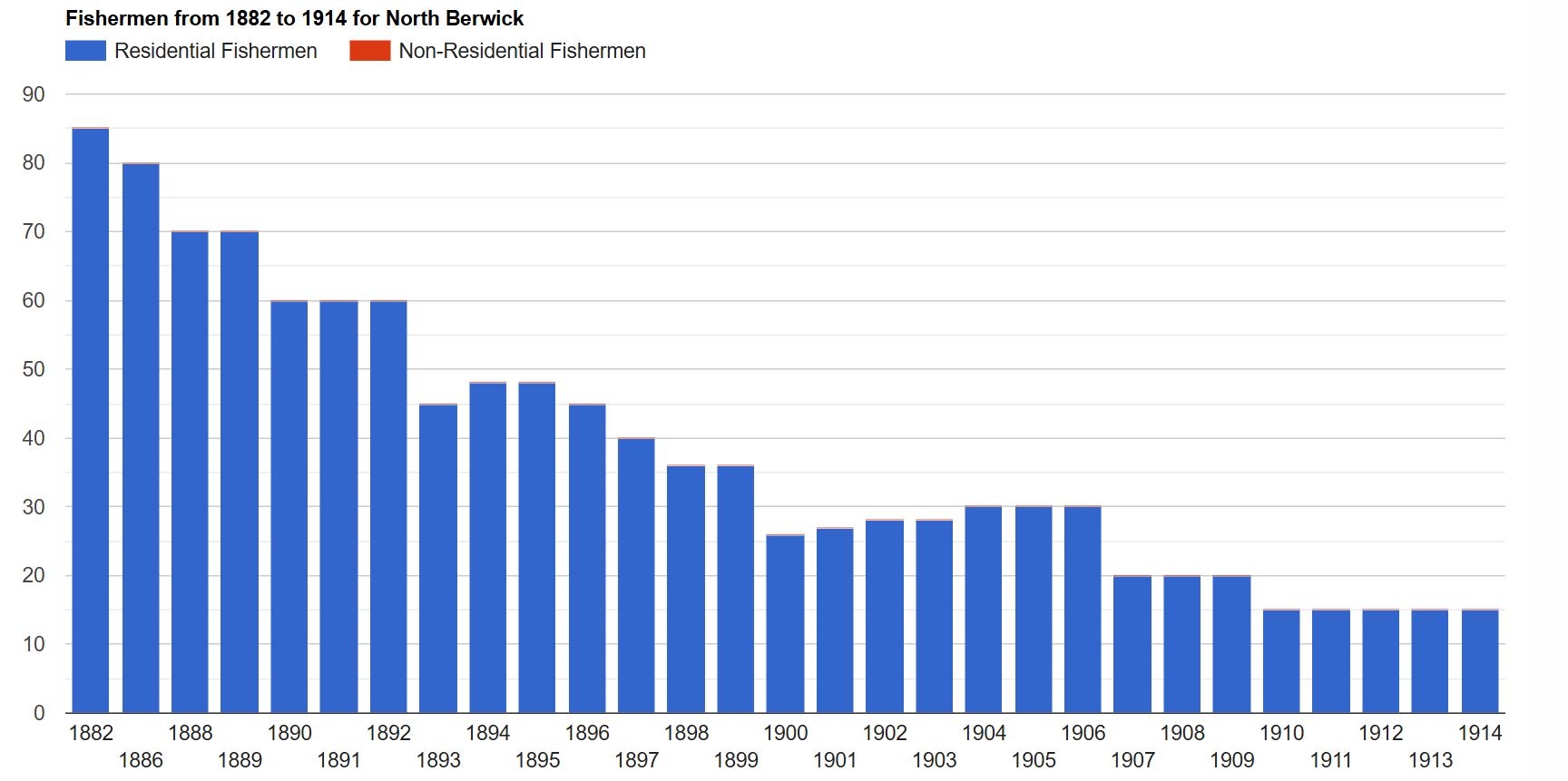
Fishermen

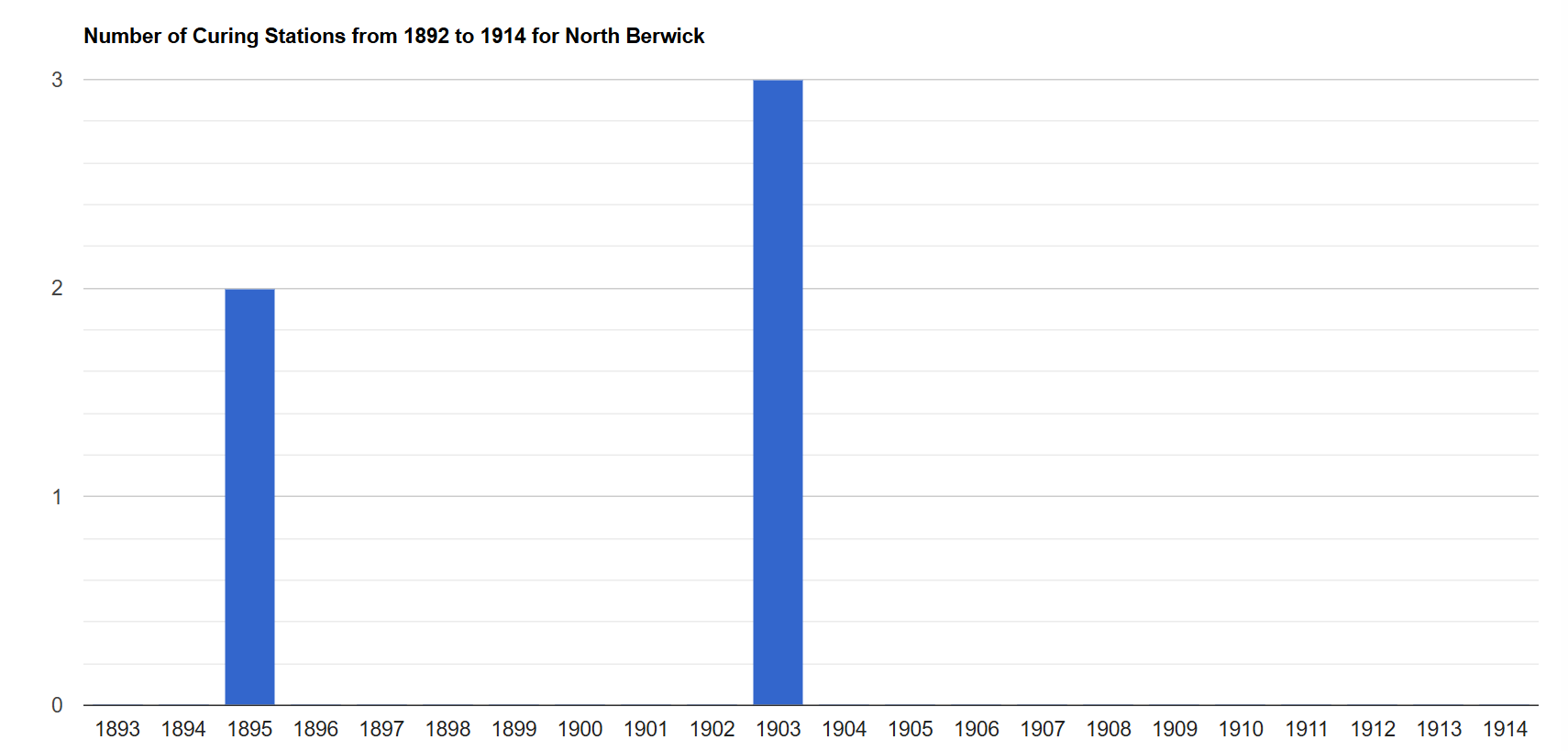
Number of curing stations

The size and population of the town remained fairly steady until the 1970s, at which point housebuilding began in earnest around the periphery of the town, first to the south (1950s–70s), then in a series of major expansions to the west (1980s-present) along the line of the railway. There is talk of further developments focussing on "affordable housing", on the south side of the town. While the population has grown significantly but not truly "exploded", house prices have rocketed since the 1950s. North Berwick consistently appears at the top of national house price surveys, and like-for-like prices are comparable to Edinburgh. North Berwick was listed as the most expensive seaside town in Scotland in 2006, and was second to St. Andrews in 2009. In 2021, it was voted best place to live in Scotland.

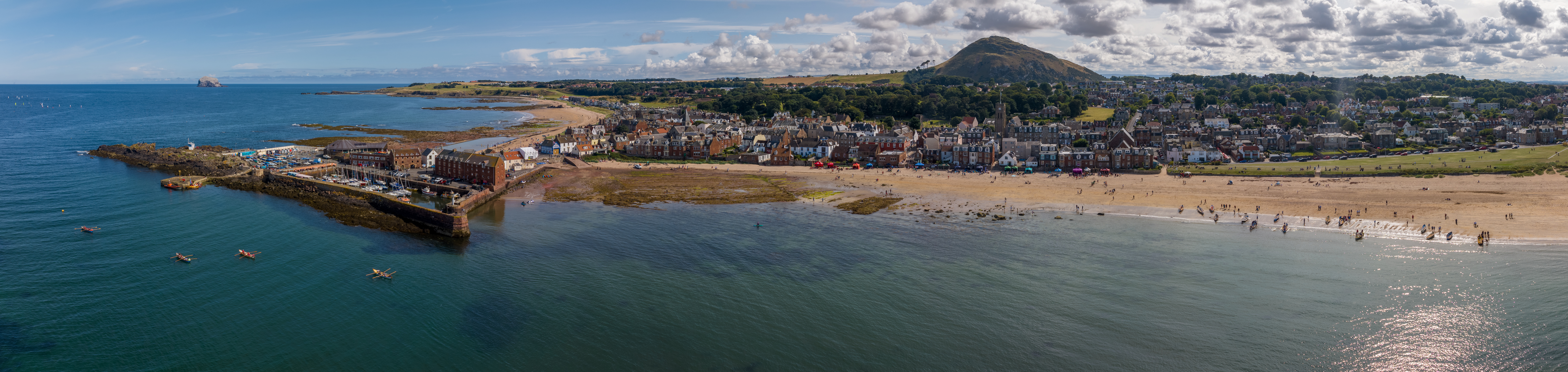
North Berwick

== Islands ==
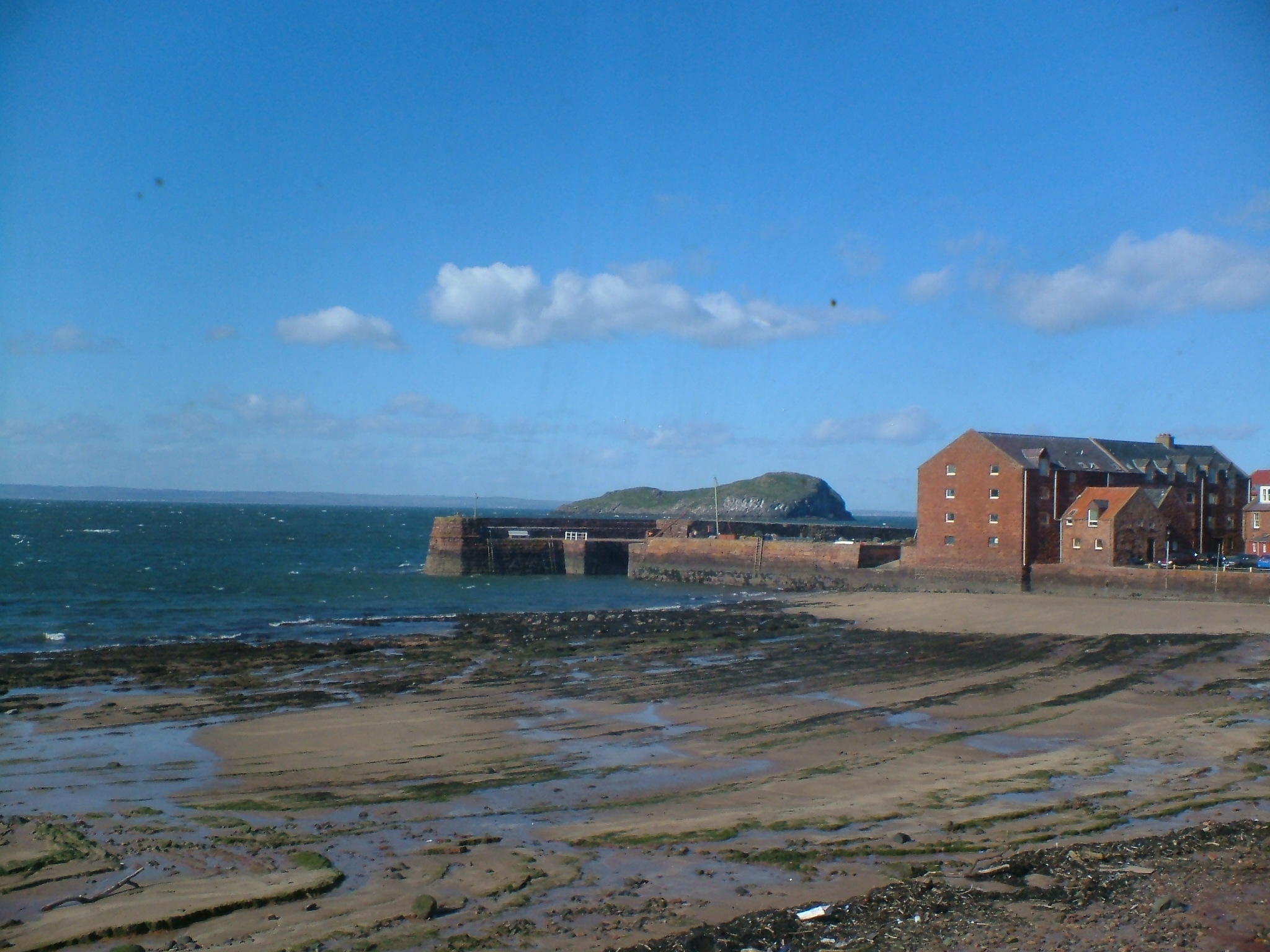
Harbour and Craigleith

Several of the Islands of the Forth are near the town and visible from it: e.g. Fidra, Lamb, Craigleith, and the Bass Rock; the last-named hosts a thriving colony of seabirds, including puffins and gannets. The Bass Rock appears white due to the white plumage of seabirds, and their white guano, which cover much of its surface. The seabirds can be observed at close range through remote cameras operated from the Scottish Seabird Centre near the harbour.

== Attractions ==
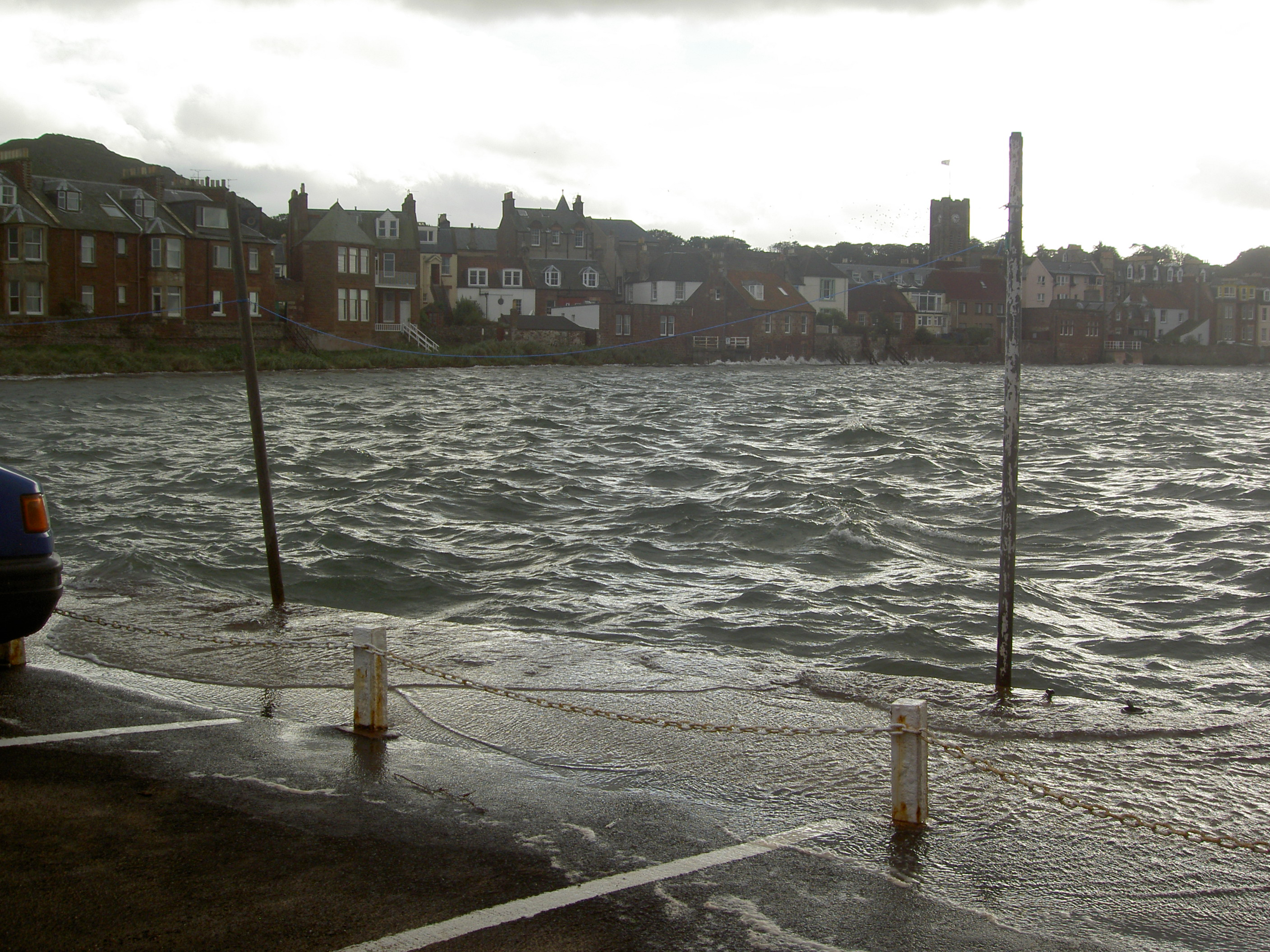
A spring tide, West Bay

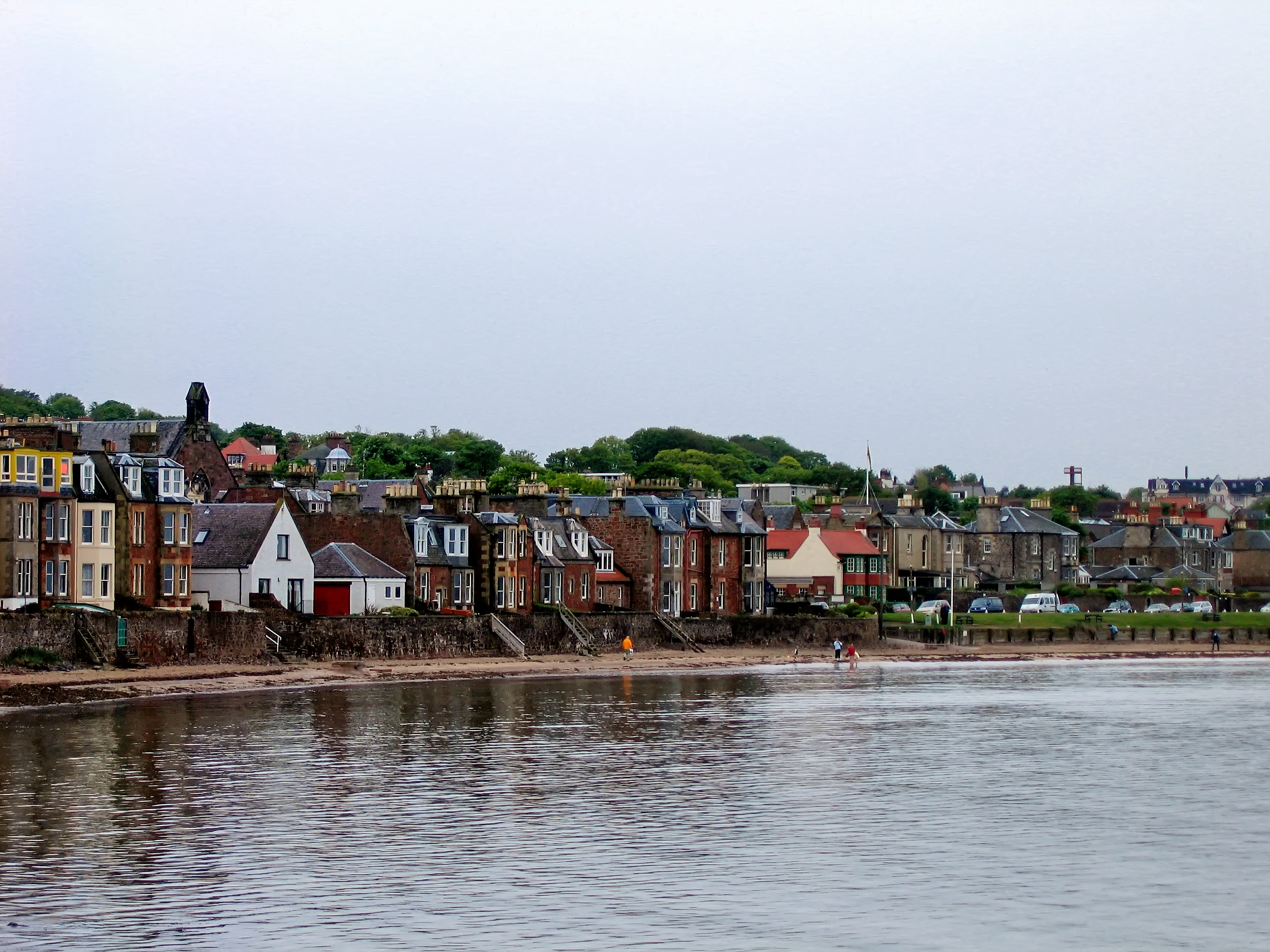
West Bay front North Berwick

- Boat trips to the Bass Rock, Fidra and other islands, although landings are restricted and depend on maritime conditions.
- Scottish Seabird Centre – Visitor centre about seabirds opened in 2000 by then-Prince Charles. It focuses on the seabirds and marine life found on nearby islands, including the Bass Rock, Fidra, and Craigleith. It features interactive exhibits, live camera feeds from local wildlife sites, and a café overlooking the Firth of Forth. Seasonal boat trips operate to Bass Rock and other islands when seabirds are present.
- North Berwick Law – A 613-foot (187 m) volcanic hill that rises above the town, with a ruined Napoleonic era signal station just below its summit. The arch at the summit, formed by a whale's jawbone, collapsed in June 2005. It was replaced by a fibreglass replica in June 2008.
- Beaches – One of North Berwick's main attractions, the beaches, have golden sands and igneous rocks sculpted into interesting shapes by the sea. The East Sands have a tide-filled boating pond/paddling pool.
- Seacliff – A largely unspoilt beach and estate, located just east of the town. Access for motor vehicles is restricted by a coin-operated barrier.
- Golf – There are two golf courses in the town, the West Links and the Glen, or East Links, and several others along the East Lothian coast. There are also two 18-hole putting greens, and a Golfing Heritage Trail through the town.
- Tennis – The tennis courts at the Glen host the annual East Lothian Open Tennis Tournament.
- The East Lothian Yacht Club hosts many national and international sailing events.
- The John Muir Way, the East Lothian coastal path, passes through the town.
- Tantallon Castle is an imposing if mostly ruined 14th-century fortress in the care of Historic Scotland, located 3 miles (5 km) east of North Berwick.

== Governance ==
Douglas Alexander of the Labour and Co-Operative Party was elected MP in the 2024 General Election. Kenny MacAskill of the Alba Party served as the Member of Parliament for East Lothian from 2019 until 2024. Former East Lothian Council leader Paul McLennan of the Scottish National Party (SNP) has served as the MSP for East Lothian since 2021. There are three councillors for North Berwick Coastal.

== Churches ==
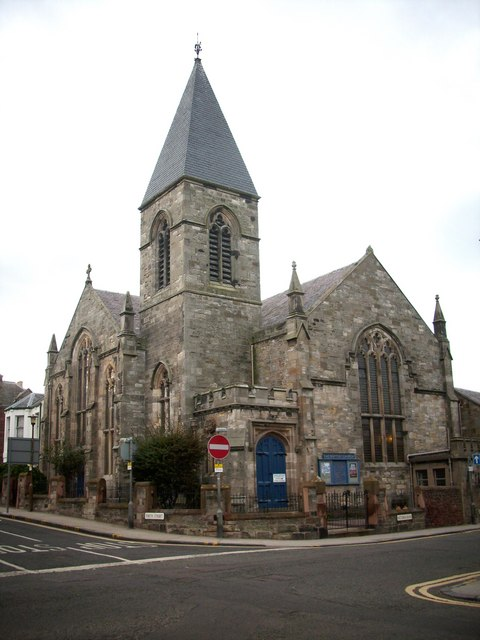
The original Blackadder church building. It was at first a Free Church, then a United Free Church, then a Church of Scotland, and is now used by an independent Baptist church.

There are several churches in the town. These include:

=== Church of Scotland ===
- Abbey Church
- Parish Kirk
- St Andrew Blackadder Church
- St Andrew's Old

=== Roman Catholic ===
- Our Lady, Star of the Sea

=== Other churches ===
- North Berwick Baptist Church
- North Berwick Christian Fellowship
- St Baldred's Episcopal Church

== Education ==
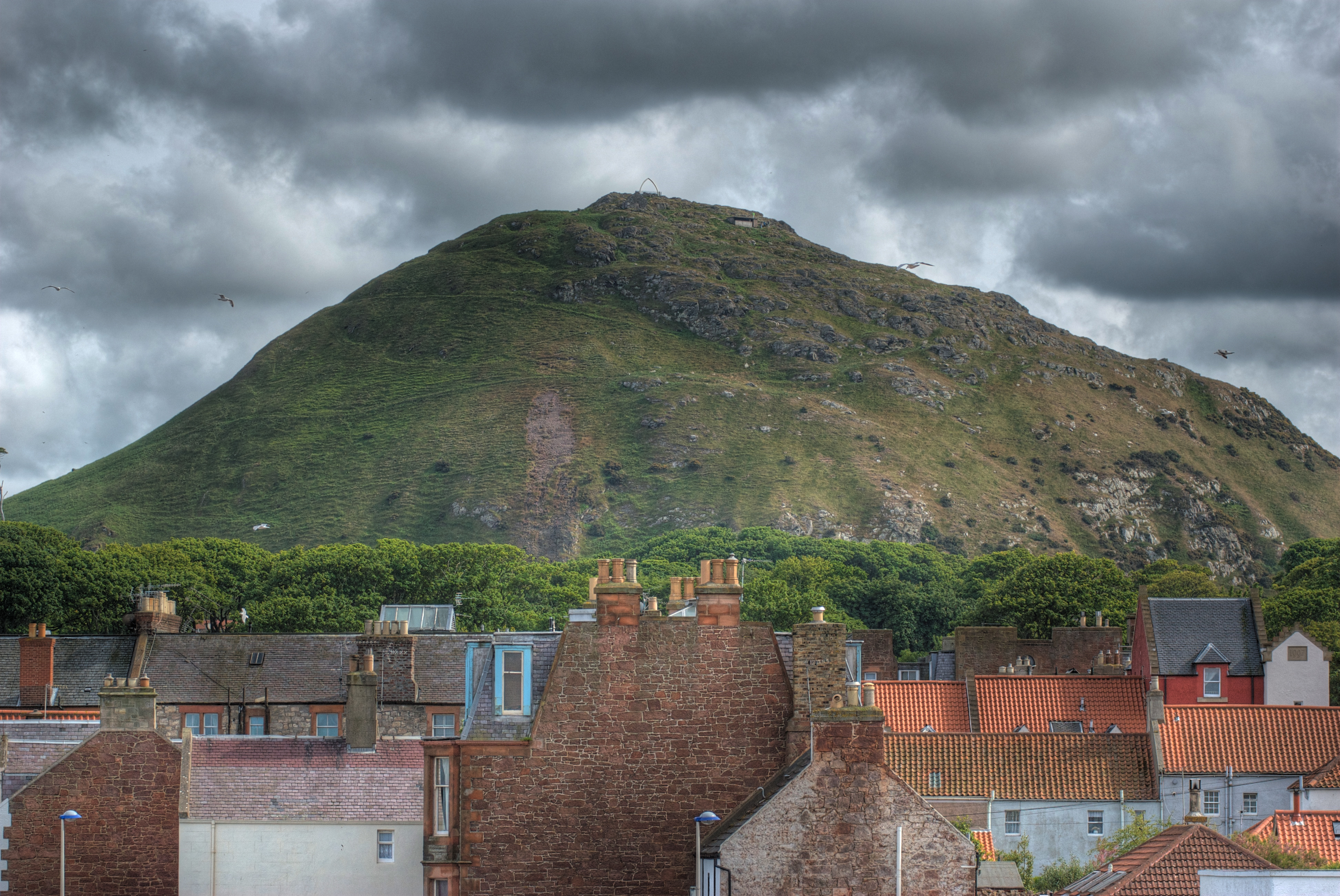
North Berwick Law seen from the seafront of North Berwick

North Berwick is served by Law Primary School, and North Berwick High School for secondary school-age children, which has an excellent reputation, frequently outperforming other East Lothian district schools in annual examination tables.

== On film ==
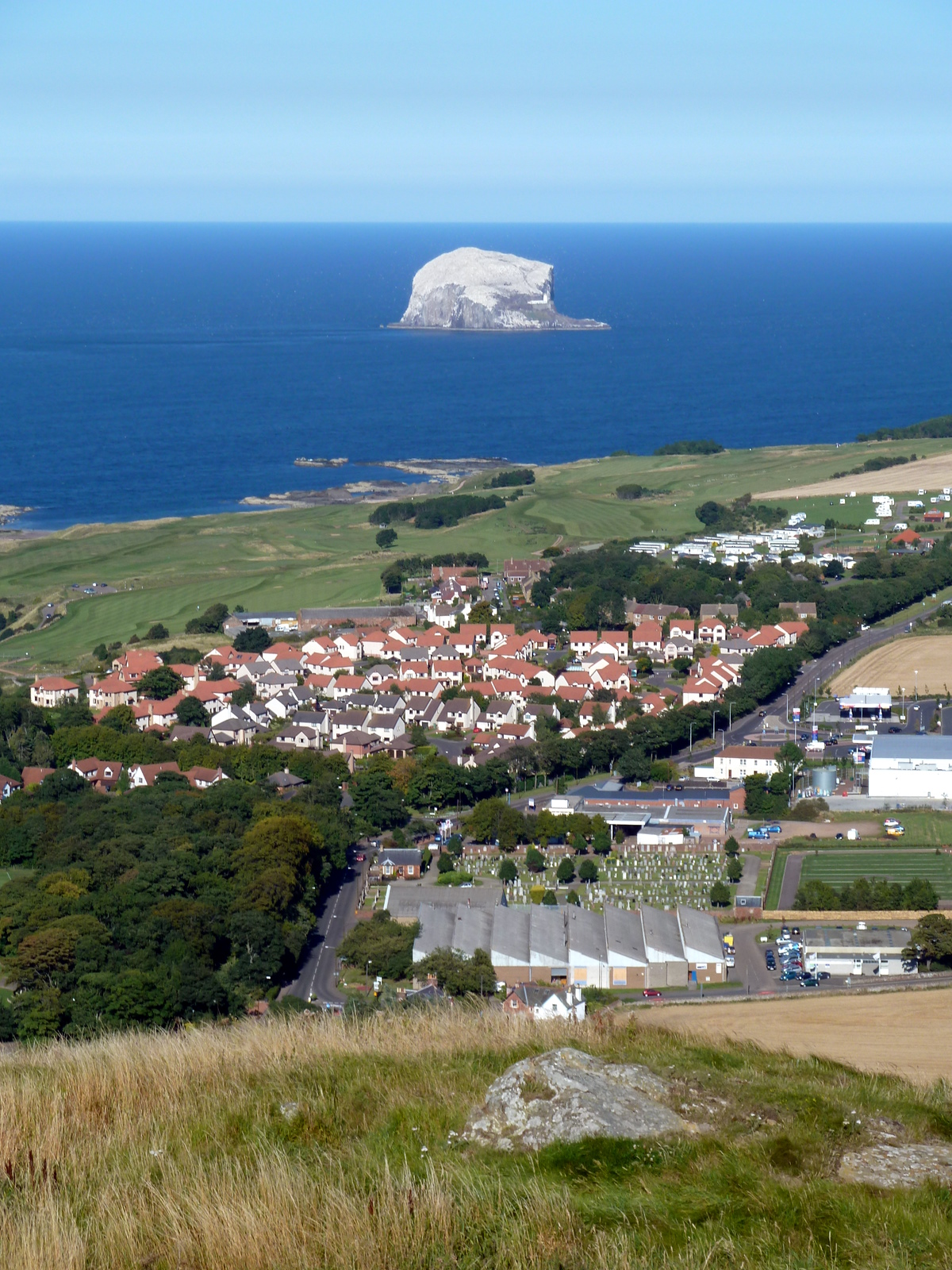
North Berwick and the Bass Rock

Films which have shots of North Berwick include:

- A View from the Bass (1963), 15 mins, colour. Directed by Henry Cooper.
- Lothian Landscape (1974), 21 mins, colour. Narrated by Gordon Jackson
- Lothians Part II, the: The Land and Its Use (1955), silent.
- The Railway Man (2013), Milsey Bay beach and house on Melbourne Road
- Outlaw King (2018), Seacliff beach

== Transport ==
The town is served by North Berwick railway station. The North Berwick Line has provided a rail link with Edinburgh since 1850, and the line, now operated by ScotRail, is still the principal transit link between the town and the capital.

East Coast Buses offers bus service.

== Literary links ==
Robert Louis Stevenson (1850–1894) spent many holidays in the town during his childhood and as a young man. His father, Thomas Stevenson the engineer and lighthouse builder, took his family to stay in various locations in the town. The island of Fidra is said to be the original inspiration for Treasure Island, and much of his novel Catriona (the sequel to Kidnapped) is set locally.

The Scottish author William Dalrymple (born 1965), whose work primarily focuses on British India, has roots in the town, with his family having once owned much of the area. William's father Sir Hew Hamilton-Dalrymple is the current and 10th Baronet of North Berwick. William is the youngest of four brothers.

== Notable people ==
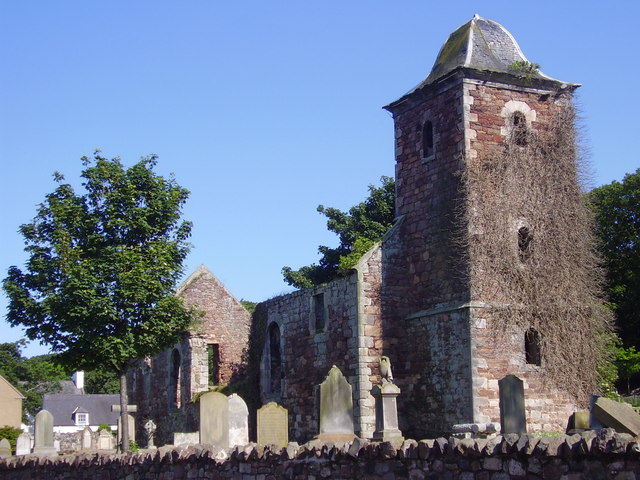
Parish Kirk, North Berwick. John Blackadder died on the Bass Rock and is buried here.

- John Adamson (1576–1653), University Principal
- William Anderson (1750–1778), naturalist who sailed with James Cook
- Willie Anderson (1879 – 1910), golfer, four times U.S. Open Golf Champion, 1901, 1903–05
- John Blackadder (1615–1685), Presbyterian field-preacher who had a Free Church named after him
- Francis Chalmers Crawford (1851–1908), botanist
- Hew Dalrymple, Lord North Berwick (1652–1737), Lord President of the Court of Session
- Isobelle Ann Dods-Withers (1876–1939), artist
- John Fian, executed in 1591 for sorcery during the North Berwick witch trials.
- Alexander Home of North Berwick (d. 1597), Provost of Edinburgh
- David Huish (born 23 April 1944), professional golfer
- George Livingstone (1880 – 1968), golfer
- Charles Lawrie (1923–1976), British golfer and golf course architect
- John Major (1467–1550), late Scholastic philosopher and logician, born in nearby Gleghornie
- Catriona Matthew, golfer with seven professional victories, including the Women's British Open in 2009, and five Solheim Cup appearances
- Ben Sayers, golfer, golf course architect and golf club manufacturer; a statue of Sayers stands on Beach Road, near the Tantallon Golf Club
- Sir Edward Albert Sharpey-Schafer (1850–1935), Professor of Physiology at the University of Edinburgh from 1899 to 1933, and Emeritus Professor from 1933 until his death, commissioned the Scottish architect Robert Lorimer to design a substantial family house at North Berwick where he resided until his death.
- Leonard Small (1905–1994), Moderator of the General Assembly of the Church of Scotland (1966–1967)
- David Syme (1827–1908), Australian newspaper proprietor and author
- Ebenezer Syme (1825–1860), Australian newspaper proprietor and manager
- James Douglas-Hamilton, Baron Selkirk of Douglas, politician, Lord High Commissioner to the General Assembly of the Church of Scotland 2012–2013
- Maggie O'Farrell Novelist
- Rear Admiral Neil E. Rankin, Captain HMS Ark Royal, Tri-Service Command Falklands, Flag Officer Portsmouth
- Sir David Tweedie (accountant), Accountant, Chair International Accounting Standards Board 2001–11
- Katy Balls, political journalist
- Keith Stewart, Baron Stewart of Dirleton, Advocate General of Scotland
- Mike Day (filmmaker), Peabody Award winning filmmaker and cinematographer
- Brian Durie, doctor

== Twin town ==
Seal of North Berwick

Since 1999, North Berwick has been twinned with Kerteminde, Denmark.

== See also ==
- List of places in East Lothian
- John Muir Way
- North Berwick Lifeboat Station
