= Scottish Seabird Centre =

Coordinates: 56.0614°N 2.7174°W

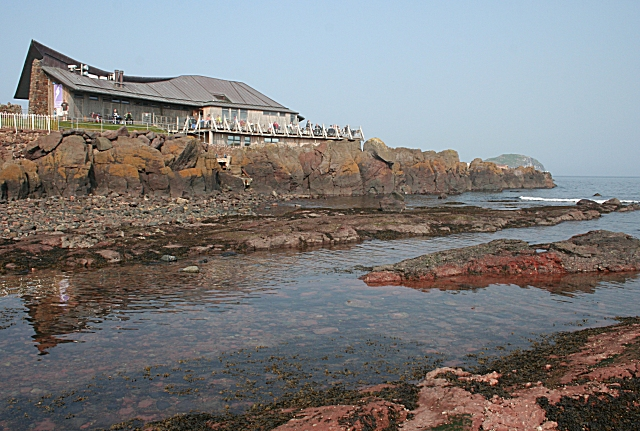
- Scottish Seabird Centre
- Interactive map of the Scottish Seabird Centre area

General information
- Location: The Harbour, North Berwick EH39 4SS, Scotland
- Construction started: 2000; 26 years ago

The Scottish Seabird Centre is a marine conservation and education charity supported by an award-winning visitor attraction in North Berwick, East Lothian, Scotland. Funded by the Millennium Commission, the Centre was opened by the Duke of Rothesay in 2000. Its main attractions are interactive cameras that provide live views of wildlife on the islands of the Firth of Forth, including Bass Rock, the Isle of May, Fidra, and Craigleith. Bass Rock is home to one of the world’s largest colonies of northern gannets, with up to 100,000 birds present.

== History ==
Materials used to construct the centre were, whenever possible, environmentally sustainable and locally sourced. The centre was designed by Edinburgh architects Simpson & Brown to make use of natural light and ventilation, and to offer panoramic views both to sea and inland towards North Berwick Law. Very little plastic was used in construction, with wood, stone and metal being preferred.

The site now occupied by the Scottish Seabird Centre once overlooked the North Berwick Outdoor Swimming Pool, a feature of the North Berwick Harbour area from the nineteenth century until its eventual closure in 1996. The old pool has been filled in and is now a boat and dinghy park for members of the East Lothian Yacht Club, is the location of the Firth of Forth Lobster Hatchery, the Beach Wheelchair enterprise and has several colourful beach huts that sell local products. The buildings housing the learning hub, boat office and administration office of the Scottish Seabird Centre were previously a sun lounge room.

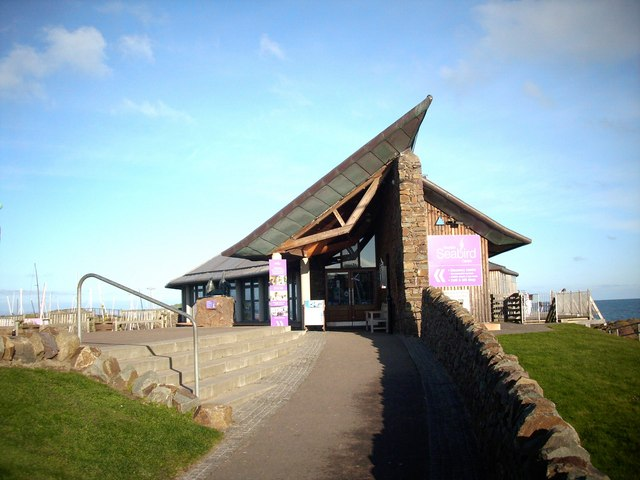
Scottish Seabird Centre

The Scottish Seabird Centre was one of the flagship projects backed by the Millennium Commission which distributed cash from the UK National Lottery to cultural and heritage-related projects. A 64p stamp commemorating the opening of the Seabird Centre was released in 2000 as part of the "Above & Beyond" collection in the Millennium Series. Although the stamp features a colony of gannets, the featured picture was taken in South Africa, not (as many assume) on the Bass Rock.

In August 2021, the charity appointed Louise Macdonald, national director for the Institute of Directors and CEO of Young Scot as its first ambassador.

Megan McCubbin - zoologist, wildlife TV presenter, and author - was appointed as an ambassador in September 2023.

== Facilities ==
The main attraction at the Scottish Seabird Centre is the Discovery Experience that contains interactive wildlife cameras which allow visitors to observe northern gannets, Atlantic puffins, shags, cormorants and other seabirds on the islands in the Firth of Forth. Additional wildlife includes seals and occasional sightings of dolphins and whales. The Discovery Experience also has a number of informative storyboards, mechanical and digital exhibits which bring Scotland's seabirds and underwater world to visitors. The exhibits cover: • Seabirds (covering migration, seabird colonies, breeding and feeding) • Threats (covering fishing, invasive species, climate change and pollution) • Marine (kelp forests, coral reef, seals, cetaceans, intertidal zone) • Discover (recent sightings, interactive live cameras, seasonal wildlife) There's a kids zone, gift shop and licensed cafe with an outdoor sun deck overlooking the Firth of Forth to the Bass Rock, and on a clear day to the Isle of May.

The Centre also recently installed a new 360 camera on the Bass Rock which live streams to a panoramic display in the Discovery Experience.

Throughout the year, the charity offers educational workshops and has live science shows for families during school holidays. There is a year-round programme of events and festivals.

== Awards ==
The Scottish Seabird Centre has become extremely popular, winning many awards for environmental and sustainable tourism including the Green Tourism Gold Award and the Queen's Award for Enterprise in Sustainable Development in 2004, 2009 and 2013. Queen Elizabeth II and Prince Philip visited the town in July 2009 to present the Scottish Seabird Centre with the award.

The Bass Rock was also named BBC Countryfile Magazine's Nature Reserve of the Year 2014/15.

== See also ==
- Joseph Bryan Nelson
- Bass Rock
- Northern gannet
- Atlantic puffin
